= Rosa Bonaparte =

East Timorese revolutionary and women's rights activist

Rosa "Muki" Bonaparte
- Born: 18 February 1957; Manatuto, Portuguese Timor
- Died: 8 December 1975 (aged 18); Dili, East Timor
- Cause of death: Execution by shooting
- Occupations: Revolutionary; activist
- Organizations: Movimento Reorganizativo do Partido do Proletariado; Fretilin; Popular Organization of Timorese Women
- Movement: Anti-colonialism; East Timorese nationalism; Feminism
- Relatives: Bernardino Bonaparte Soares (brother)

Rosa Filomena "Muki" Cardoso Bonaparte Soares (18 February 1957 – 8 December 1975) was an East Timorese revolutionary and women's rights activist. Born in what was then Portuguese Timor, in 1973 she won a scholarship to study in Portugal, where she joined the Casa dos Timores and became involved in Marxist and anti-colonial politics. Returning to Timor in late 1974, she was a founding member of Fretilin and served on the party's central committee. Known for her intensity and small figure, she was called "the petite revolutionary", "Rosa Luxemburg", and to her Fretilin comrades, "Muki".

In August 1975, Bonaparte became the first secretary-general of the Popular Organization of Timorese Women (OPMT), the Fretilin women's wing. As OPMT leader, she led the group's humanitarian work in establishing nurseries for orphans and other vulnerable children, and oversaw literacy, health, and livelihood initiatives for Timorese women. Bonaparte was present for Fretilin's unilateral declaration of independence from Portugal on 28 November 1975, and was reportedly the first to unfurl the new flag of the Democratic Republic of East Timor. She was killed by Indonesian soldiers in Dili during the invasion of East Timor. Bonaparte is remembered today for her significant role in East Timor's women's movement and anticolonial struggle during the 1970s.

== Early life and education ==
Rosa Filomena Cardoso Bonaparte Soares was born on 18 February 1957 in Manatuto, a small town on the northern coast of what was then Portuguese Timor. Her father, Joaquim Bonaparte Soares, was a Manatuto native and worked for Correios, Telégrafos e Telefones, a Portuguese mail and telecommunications company. Her mother, Alda da Costa Oliveira, came from nearby Metinaro. Bonaparte was the first of thirteen siblings, the others being Bárbara, Mariano, Diogo, Rosa Helena, Margarida de Oliveira, Bernardino Joaquim Ribeiro, Deolinda Severina, Rosalino de Oliveira, Madalena Apolonia Gomes, and Alda Maria de Oliveira, stepsister Maria Felizarda, and an unnamed baby who died before birth.

Bonaparte began her primary education at the Canossian sisters' school for girls in Ossu. There, she also learned sewing. In 1967, she continued her schooling in Dili, moving on in 1969 to the Escola Industrial e Comercial Professor Silva Cunha. Graduating in 1973 with high marks, she won a scholarship to pursue her university studies in Portugal in commerce.

== Revolutionary activity ==
In 1974, Bonaparte was one of only 39 Timorese students studying in Portugal. She soon became involved in left-wing politics, and joined the Movimento Reorganizativo do Partido do Proletariado, a Maoist group. She also frequented the Casa dos Timores, an apartment in Lisbon which became a site of political discussion and anticolonial activist organizing by Timorese students. Bonaparte's studies in Portugal coincided with the April 1974 Carnation Revolution, after which Timorese political parties began to operate openly. In the months that followed, the Casa dos Timores accelerated its political activities. On 13 July 1974, the group passed a resolution reaffirming its solidarity with national liberation movements around the world, and in particular those in the Portuguese colonial empire, including the MPLA in Angola, FRELIMO in Mozambique, the PAIGC in Portuguese Guinea and Cape Verde, and the MLSTP in São Tomé and Príncipe. During this period, Bonaparte visited PAIGC-controlled areas during the war of independence in Portuguese Guinea.

The Casa dos Timores' next political move was to send a delegation to Timor to take part in the changing politics in the colony. The Portuguese government had already made available some funds for university students who had achieved good marks to return to their home countries for a holiday. With some members having already obtained this funding, the Casa dos Timores held a meeting and elected Abílio Araújo, António Carvarinho, and Vicente dos Reis to return to Timor for political work. Several others joined the trip, including Bonaparte and Araújo's wife Guilhermina dos Santos. The group arrived in Dili by plane at the Aitarak Laran airport on 11 September 1974 at 1pm.

Upon returning to Timor, Bonaparte joined the Revolutionary Front for an Independent East Timor (Fretilin), the leading pro-independence party, and quickly established herself among the organization's leadership. She became one of only three women to serve on Fretilin's 50-strong original central committee, along with Guilhermina Araújo and Maria do Céu Pereira. Along with many other former Casa dos Timores members, she participated in Fretilin's grassroots mobilization work, including organizing political education classes, which led to the formation of the National Union of Timorese Students (UNETIM) in October 1974. In May 1975, she took part in the Portuguese Decolonization Commission negotiations in Dili. Noted for her intensity and small figure, the Portuguese negotiators called her "the petite revolutionary" and "Rosa Luxemburg". To her Timorese comrades, she was known by the nickname "Muki".

On 28 August 1975, Bonaparte became secretary-general of the newly-formed Fretilin women's wing, the Popular Organization of Timorese Women (OPMT; Portuguese: Organização Popular da Mulher Timor). Within weeks, the OPMT had grown to 7,000 members, with chapters across the colony. Bonaparte authored the group's manifesto, titled "The Popular Organization of Timorese Women: Analysis of the Situation of Timorese Women", published in the Fretilin newspaper Jornal do Povo Mau Bere on 27 September 1975 and presented to the party's central committee the following day. Offering a theoretical analysis of the women's liberation movement in East Timor at the time, Bonaparte argued that Timorese women faced a "double exploitation" by both "traditionalist" and "colonialist conceptions" and identified the causes of their oppression as "both cultural and structural." The manifesto condemned barlake (the traditional Timorese wedding traditions, including bride price), polygamy, and the sexual exploitation of women by "colonialist bosses". Bonaparte wrote several more articles in the Jornal do Povo Mau Bere and another published in a Trotskyist newspaper and reproduced posthumously in 1977 in East Timor News, the Australian solidarity movement's publication.

The OPMT's two central objectives, as described by Bonaparte in an article published in the Australian labor newspaper Direct Action in September 1975, were "firstly, to participate directly in the struggle against colonialism, and second, to fight in every way the violent discrimination that Timorese women had suffered in colonial society." By the first week of September 1975, the OPMT had established childcare centers in Dili, Maubisse, and Turiscai to serve orphans and others affected by the previous month's fighting between Fretilin and the Timorese Democratic Union, a conservative political party. Under Bonaparte's leadership, the organization also carried out literacy drives for Timorese women, which were taught, for the first time, in Tetum rather than Portuguese. The OPMT also organized health and livelihood programs.

Bonaparte returned early from Maubisse, where she and several other OPMT members were operating the Mau Koli childcare center, to Dili to take part in Fretilin's unilateral declaration of independence from Portugal on 28 November 1975. She was reportedly the first to unfurl the new flag of the Democratic Republic of East Timor.

== Death ==
On 7 December 1975, Indonesia launched an invasion of East Timor, beginning with an assault on Dili. The following morning, Indonesian soldiers rounded up civilians from various parts of the city into a park in front of Hotel Timor, near the Dili waterfront. With the help of several Timorese members of the pro-Indonesian Timorese Popular Democratic Association, the soldiers began identifying Fretilin members and their relatives among the crowd. Bonaparte was among those identified, and was escorted by soldiers to the nearby Dili port, where she was shot. Her body was dumped into the harbor, and was sighted on the shore the following day. She was just 18 at the time of her death.

Others killed at the port the same day included Isabel Barreto Lobato, the wife of Prime Minister Nicolau Lobato; Francisco Borja da Costa, the author of East Timor's national anthem; Roger East, an Australian journalist; and Bonaparte's brother, Bernardino Bonaparte Soares, who was under-secretary for foreign affairs in the independent East Timor's first Council of Ministers.

== Legacy ==
Following her death, Bonaparte was replaced as OPMT leader by Maria José Boavida, until she herself was killed by Indonesian forces in 1979. Despite the loss of Bonaparte, the OPMT continued to play an important role in the Timorese resistance during the Indonesian occupation, through both material support for Falintil guerrilla fighters and as a conduit of communication between the guerrillas and the clandestinos operating within Indonesian-controlled areas. In 2006, Bonaparte was posthumously awarded the Order of Dom Boaventura, which is given to "founder combatants" of the liberation movement who "promoted, organized, and led the resistance" between 15 August 1975 and 31 May 1976. She was one of only four women to share the honor among the 61 awardees.

As several scholars have noted, Bonaparte—and the role of women more broadly—is largely absent or minimized in the historical narrative of East Timor's liberation struggle. Still, a number of writings have studied Bonaparte's life and her significance to the development of the Timorese women's movement in the 1970s, as well as her contributions to the anticolonial struggle in East Timor. Bonaparte also features prominently in Buibere Hamrik Tebe Rai Metin Ukun Rasik An, a history of the role of women in the Timorese liberation struggle. In 2015, Muki, a children's historical fiction book about Bonaparte, was published by former Prime Minister Xanana Gusmão and his wife Kirsty Sword Gusmão. Part of an initiative by the Ministry of Education to improve East Timor's primary school curriculum, the book was published in Tetum and Portuguese.

Bonaparte is commemorated in the Jardim Rosa "Muki" Bonaparte, a garden located within a prominent roundabout in the Mandarin area of Dili. The garden was donated by the government or Ireland and later rehabilitated by a Singaporean business. In Manatuto, where Bonaparte was born, an avenue also bears her name.
