= Proclamation of Independence Day (Timor-Leste) =

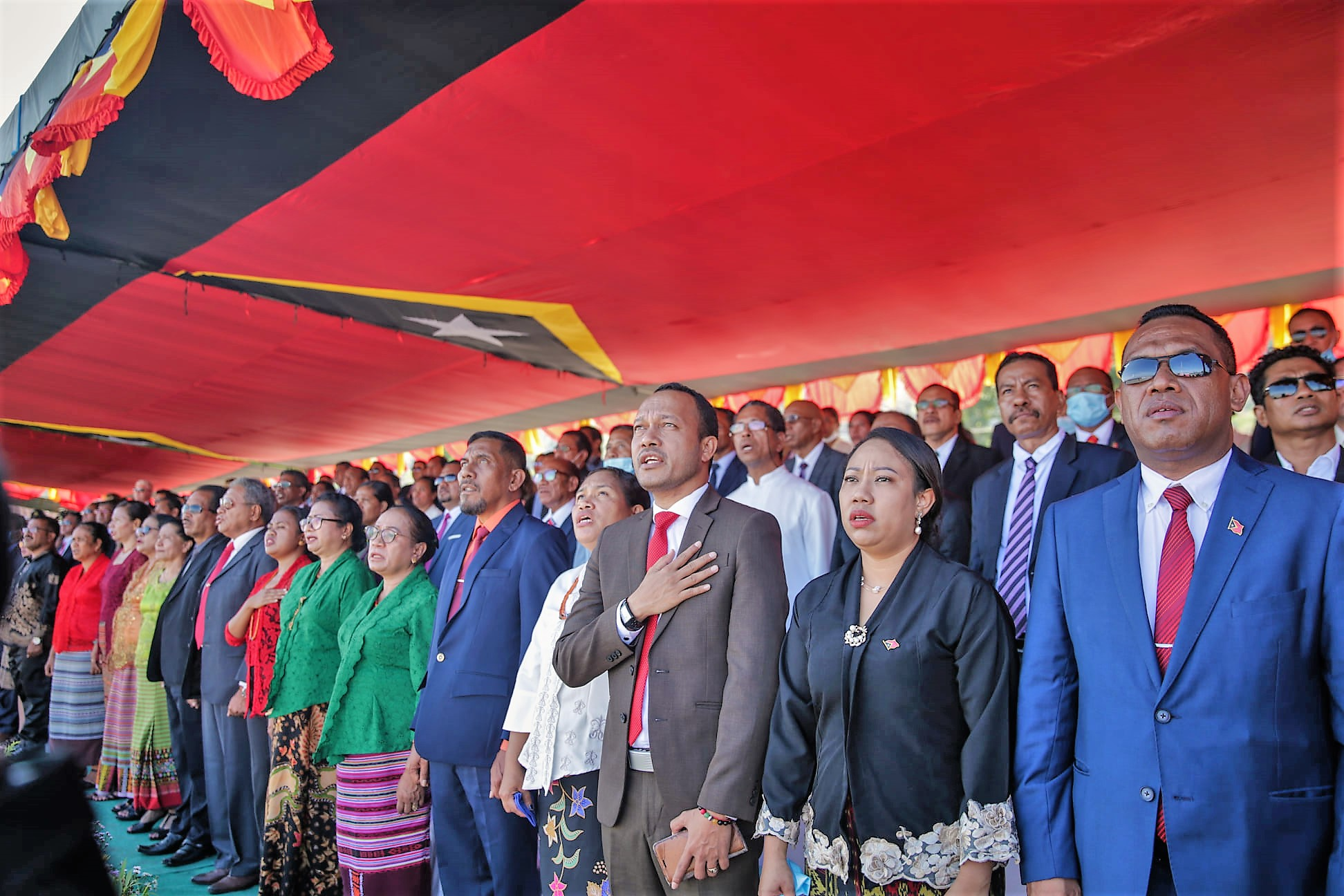
- Singing the hymn at the 2020 proclamation day celebrations in Lauhata, Timor-Leste.
- Also called: Dia da Proclamação da Independência
- Observed by: East Timorese
- Type: National
- Significance: Marks the Proclamation of Timor-Leste Independence
- Date: 28 November
- Next time: 28 November 2026
- Frequency: Annual

Proclamation of Independence Day (Portuguese: Dia da Proclamação da Independência) is a national holiday and a celebration to commemorate the East Timor Unilateral Declaration of Independence from the Portuguese rule in 1975. The event is annually celebrated on 28 November and marked by official and unofficial ceremonies and observances. The event is defined by the Timor-Leste parliament in the Law No. 10/2005 Of 10 August as part of its national holiday.

== History ==
A year after the April 25 Revolution, Portugal consecrated freedom to its overseas provinces. Under conditions of destabilization, propaganda and military pressure from Indonesia, Fretilin finally proclaimed the independence of the Democratic Republic of East Timor on 28 November 1975 with Xavier do Amaral as President and Nicolau Lobato as Prime Minister.

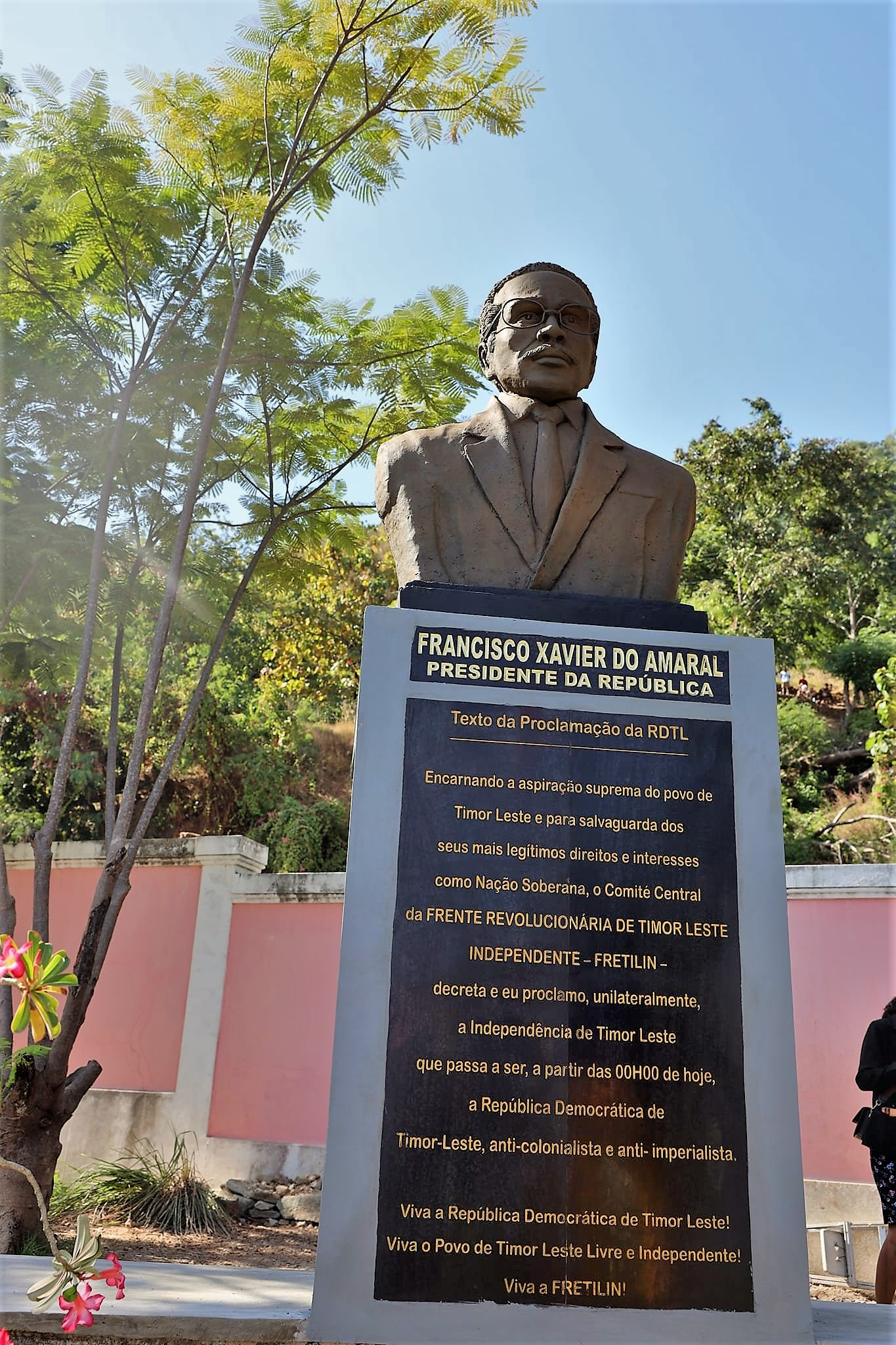
RDTL UDI text in the Xavier do Amaral monument.

A few days after the proclamation, UDT and three other smaller parties announced the 'Balibo Declaration' - a call calling for the Indonesian government to annex Timor. Even though it is called the Balibo Declaration, witnesses who signed it testified that the draft declaration was drafted in Jakarta and signed at a hotel in Bali under conditions of coercion as recorded in the report of the Commission for Reception, Truth and Reconciliation for Timor-Leste (CAVR) in 2005.

With that proclamation also came a civil war. To combat this force, the East Timorese resistance creates the Revolutionary Front of Independent Timor-Leste (FRETILIN). The fighting between Fretilin and its military wing took place in the interior, the Armed Forces for the National Liberation of Timor-Leste (Falintil).

Nine days later, Indonesia invaded East Timor on 7 December 1975. Indonesia decided to invade Timorese territory under the pretext of defending citizens of Indonesian ethnicity. The attack allowed Indonesia to successfully occupy Timor for 24 years.

=== Unilateral Declaration of Independence ===
East Timor, under FRETILIN rule, unilaterally declared its independence on 28 November 1975. This following text of proclamation is written on a memorial monument built to commemorate the 1975 Government of East Timor:

In Portuguese:

Texto da Proclamação da RDTL

Encarnando a aspiração suprema do povo de Timor Leste e para salvaguarda dos
seus mais legítimos direitos e interesses
como Nação Soberana, o Comité Central
da FRENTE REVOLUCIONÁRIA DE TIMOR LESTE
INDEPENDENTE – FRETILIN –
decreta e eu proclamo, unilateralmente,
a Independência de Timor Leste
que passa a ser, a partir das 00H00 de hoje,
a República Democrática de
Timor-Leste, anti-colonialista e anti- imperialista.

Viva a República Democrática de Timor Leste !

Viva o Povo de Timor Leste Livre e Independente !

Viva a FRETILIN !

In English:

Text of the RDTL Proclamation

Embodying the supreme aspiration of the people of East Timor and for safeguarding the
their most legitimate rights and interests
as a Sovereign Nation, the Central Committee
of the EAST TIMOR REVOLUTIONARY FRONT
INDEPENDENT – FRETILIN –
decrees and I proclaim, unilaterally,
the Independence of East Timor
which will be, as of 00:00 today,
the Democratic Republic of
Timor-Leste, anti-colonialist and anti-imperialist.

Long Live the Democratic Republic of East Timor!

Long Live the People of Free and Independent East Timor!

Long live the FRETILIN!

== Observance ==
The Proclamation of Independence Day has been a national holiday in Timor-Leste since 2005.

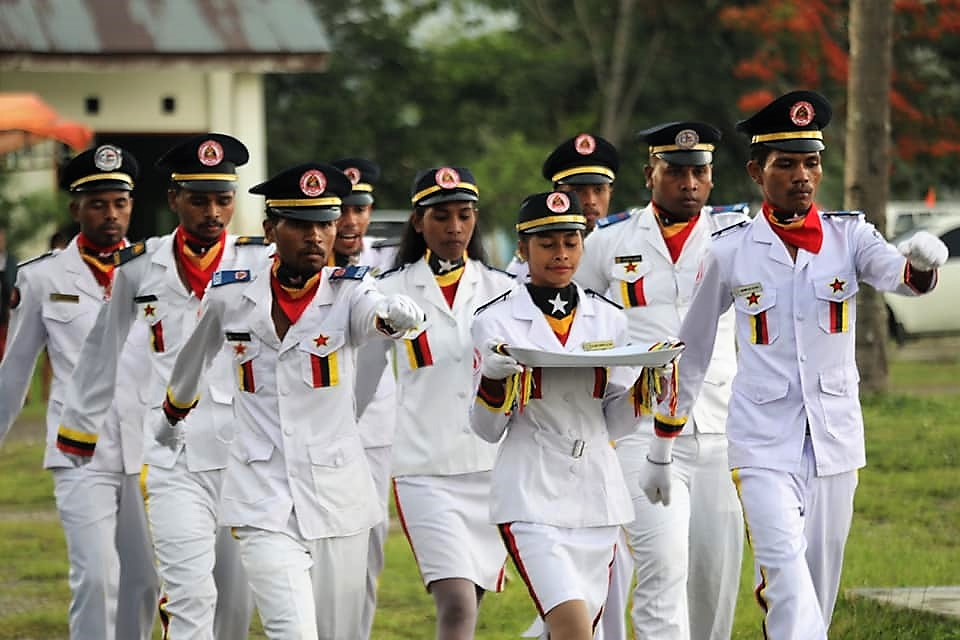
Flag hoisting ceremony on Proclamation Day 2020 in Gleno.

The event is celebrated annually with a ceremony attended by the government of Timor-Leste, with a flag rising ceremony and the singing of the national anthem. The military of Timor-Leste also performs military parades in the country. Students, civil servants and state agents, are required to participate in the celebrations and commemorative ceremonies of the Proclamation of Independence Day taking place in public services or teaching establishments, whether public or private.
