= Isabel Barreto Lobato =

Timorese freedom fighter Isabel Barreto

Personal details
- Born: 1948 Bazartete, Portuguese Timor
- Died: 8 December 1975 (aged 26–27) Dili, East Timor
- Cause of death: Execution by firing squad
- Party: Fretilin
- Spouse: Nicolau dos Reis Lobato (m. 1972)
- Children: 1
- Relatives: Rogerio Lobato (brother-in-law)

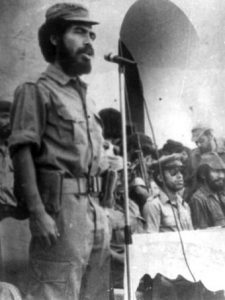
Nicolau dos Reis Lobato, 1975

Isabel Barreto Lobato (1948 – 8 December 1975) was a Portuguese Timorese and East Timorese politician, political activist, and member of Fretilin who was active in the movement for independence from Portugal. Barreto Lobato was a leading member of the Fretilin Women's Association at the time of East Timor's unilateral declaration of independence in November 1975. She was the wife of East Timor's UDI prime minister, Nicolau dos Reis Lobato, who held the office for nine days before the Indonesian invasion and occupation.

== Personal life ==
Barreto Lobato was born in the village of Bazartete, Portuguese Timor, in 1948. She married Nicolau dos Reis Lobato in a Catholic wedding ceremony at a chapel in Bazartete in 1972. The couple had one son, José Maria Barreto Lobato.

On 7 December 1975, Indonesia invaded East Timor shortly after the country unilaterally declared independence from Portugal. Barreto Lobato and other members of Fretilin's political leadership were captured by Indonesian troops. The next morning, Barreto Lobato and her colleagues were taken to Dili's waterfront wharf where they were shot by Indonesian forces and their corpses thrown into the harbor. Other individuals killed with Barreto Lobato during the mass execution included Rosa Bonaparte, Bernardino Bonaparte, and Francisco Borja da Costa, the composer of East Timor's national anthem.

Her husband Nicolau managed to escape to the mountains of the interior at the start of the invasion. Nicolau Lobato helped wage a guerrilla war against the Indonesian occupation, until he was killed in 1978 by Indonesian forces led by Lieutenant Prabowo Subianto.

The 24-year Indonesian occupation resulted in the deaths of an estimated 200,000 East Timorese.
