= Timor-Leste independence =

Independence of Timor-Leste from Indonesia in 2002

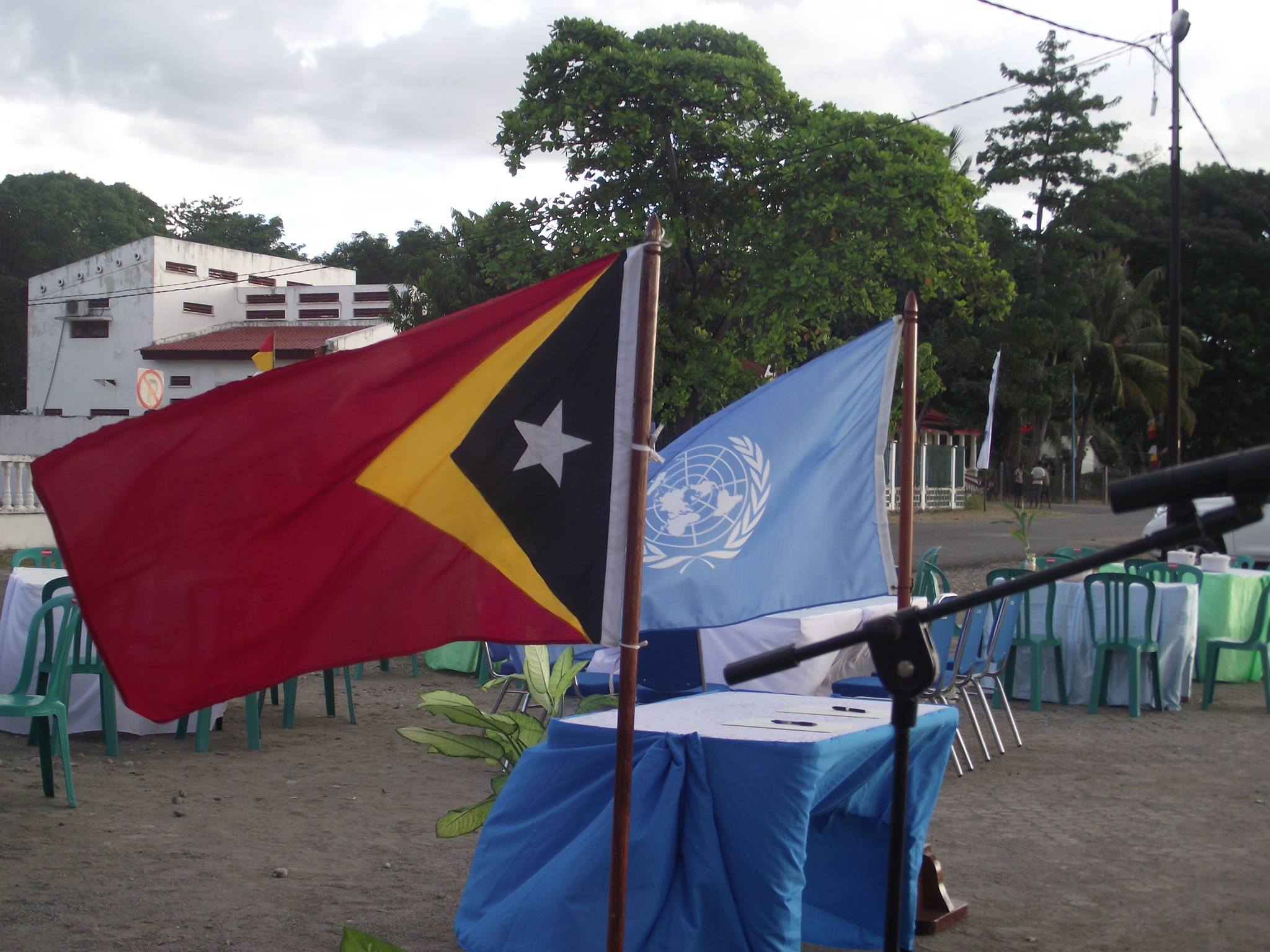
The flags of Timor-Leste and the United Nations on Independence Day 2014

Timor is an island in South East Asia. Geologically considered a continental crustal fragment, it lies alongside the Sunda shelf, and is the largest in a cluster of islands between Java and New Guinea. European colonialism has shaped Timorese history since 1515, a period when it was divided between the Dutch in the west of the island (now Indonesian West Timor) and the Portuguese in the east (now the independent state of East Timor). A year after the April 25 Revolution, Portugal consecrated freedom to its overseas provinces. Under conditions of destabilization, propaganda and military pressure from Indonesia, Fretilin finally proclaimed the independence of the Democratic Republic of East Timor on 28 November 1975 with Xavier do Amaral as President and Nicolau Lobato as Prime Minister.

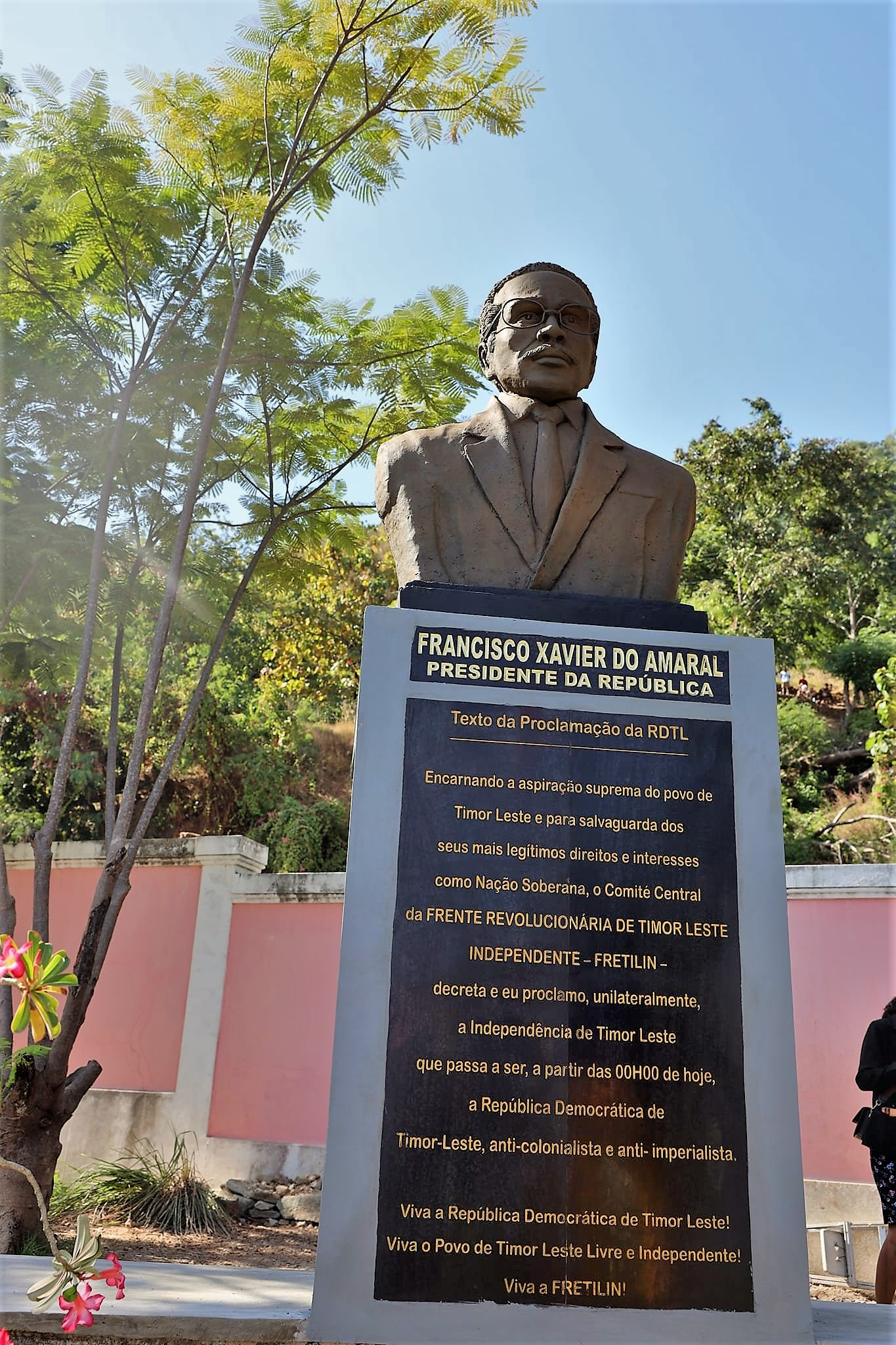
RDTL UDI text in the Xavier do Amaral monument

A few days after the proclamation, UDT and three other smaller parties announced the 'Balibo Declaration' - a call calling for the Indonesian government to annex East Timor. Even though it is called the Balibo Declaration, witnesses who signed it testified that the draft declaration was drafted in Jakarta and signed at a hotel in Bali under conditions of coercion as recorded in the report of the Commission for Reception, Truth and Reconciliation for Timor-Leste (CAVR) in 2005.

With that proclamation also came a civil war. To combat this force, the East Timorese resistance formed the Revolutionary Front of Independent Timor-Leste (FRETILIN). The fighting between Fretilin and its military wing took place in the interior, the Armed Forces for the National Liberation of Timor-Leste (Falintil).

Nine days later, Indonesia invaded East Timor on 7 December 1975 under the pretext of defending citizens of Indonesian ethnicity. Indonesia occupied Timor for 24 years.

== Unilateral Declaration of Independence ==
East Timor, under FRETILIN rule, unilaterally declared its independence on 28 November 1975. This following text of proclamation is written on a memorial monument built to commemorate the 1975 Government of East Timor:

In Portuguese:

Texto da Proclamação da RDTL

Encarnando a aspiração suprema do povo de Timor Leste e para salvaguarda dos
seus mais legítimos direitos e interesses
como Nação Soberana, o Comité Central
da FRENTE REVOLUCIONÁRIA DE TIMOR LESTE
INDEPENDENTE – FRETILIN –
decreta e eu proclamo, unilateralmente,
a Independência de Timor Leste
que passa a ser, a partir das 00H00 de hoje,
a República Democrática de
Timor-Leste, anti-colonialista e anti- imperialista.

Viva a República Democrática de Timor Leste !

Viva o Povo de Timor Leste Livre e Independente !

Viva a FRETILIN !

In English:

Text of the RDTL Proclamation

Embodying the supreme aspiration of the people of East Timor and for safeguarding the
their most legitimate rights and interests
as a Sovereign Nation, the Central Committee
of the EAST TIMOR REVOLUTIONARY FRONT
INDEPENDENT – FRETILIN –
decrees and I proclaim, unilaterally,
the Independence of East Timor
which will be, as of 00:00 today,
the Democratic Republic of
Timor-Leste, anti-colonialist and anti-imperialist.

Long Live the Democratic Republic of East Timor!

Long Live the People of Free and Independent East Timor!

Long live the FRETILIN!

East Timor independence formally occurred on 20 May 2002. The country was occupied and annexed by Indonesia for 24 years from 1976 to 1999, a period during which many observers consider a genocide to have taken place. It was estimated by one report that the Indonesian occupation of East Timor was responsible for 180,000 deaths in the 24-year period. The human rights violations of the Indonesian government resulted in a home-grown resistance movement pushing for independence. Several pro-independence organisations such as the centre-left Fretilin (and its armed wing Falintil) and the centre-right Timorese Democratic Union (UDT) joined forces in 1986 in the National Council of Maubere/Timorese Resistance, a coalition which grew over time and by 1998 included all East Timorese political parties. The 1991 Dili Massacre, which was recorded on video and was widely reported to have killed between 180 and 200 people, was a turning point for the independence cause. Publicity about the atrocity stimulated the emergence of an East Timor solidarity movement in Portugal, the Philippines, Australia, and other Western countries. United States support for Indonesia ended and the U.S. military pulled out of Indonesia. Following civil unrest and protests, long-time president Suharto (1967–1998) fell from power in May 1998 and was replaced by B. J. Habibie.

Although Habibie was opposed to outright independence, he allowed an East Timorese referendum on special autonomy or independence on 30 August 1999. In the lead-up to and aftermath of the referendum, in which 78.5% of voters chose independence rather than special autonomy, the 1999 East Timorese crisis occurred, with lethal violence between pro-Indonesia militias and pro-independence forces. UN peacemaking troops of the INTERFET intervened on 20 September 1999 to address the humanitarian and security crisis. The Indonesian government formally recognised the result of the referendum on 19 October 1999, after which UN peacekeeping troops of the UNTAET oversaw the transition period to independence until 2002, during which some deadly clashes continued to occur.

== Australian shift in policy and letter from John Howard ==
Around this time Australian support for Indonesia over East Timor had been changing. Under the past Fraser and Hawke governments, there had been support for Indonesia over its rule of East Timor. Even after the Dili Massacre, when the US military pulled out in protest, Paul Keating's Government had increased military support, Keating himself was close to Suharto, and had financial dealings with Indonesian business. At this time, there was an increase in East Timor itself of more overt feelings towards independence. The Australian Government's policy was also shifting, and while in the past it was one of the few countries that recognised Indonesia's control over East Timor, the Government's view at this time changed towards the possibility of some sort of autonomy. This shift in policy was initially revealed by journalists, and then formally acknowledged by the Australian Foreign minister, Alexander Downer, on 12 January 1999. Australian Prime Minister John Howard, proposed by letter to the president of Indonesia that there should be a referendum for the people of East Timor, to do with their autonomy. While the letter advocated that the referendum take place over the next 10 or 20 years, Indonesian President B. J. Habibie, however, prompted by the letter, decided to have a referendum on independence immediately.

Though it was noted there had been a fair amount of diplomacy between the two leaders, who generally had good relations, It was said that Habibie was not happy with the letter, which prompted him to act. Also, from the Indonesian point of view, there was a reluctance to continue to support and invest money into East Timor, for an extended period of time, if in fact Timor would simply leave Indonesia at some point in the future.

This was unexpected by the Australian government, who expected the letter to be rejected, and even if it was considered, expected a move to autonomy to be planned and to take place years if not decades in the future. However, the fact that it signalled a change in policy by the Australian government, obviously indicated a change in support for Indonesia over its governance of Timor.

== Declaration of Referendum ==
On 27 January, at the urging of Habibie, the Indonesian cabinet agreed that the issue of East Timor's future should be put to a consultative process in the province. Habibie had gone ahead without the approval of the military, who were largely against the vote. While they could not stop it, the military frustrated the process, including supporting pro-integration militias. They also delayed acceptance of peacekeepers.

== Vote ==
Widespread slayings by the Indonesian military and associated militias followed the vote's announcement. It was estimated that around 1500 East Timorese were killed and more than 250,000 forcibly displaced into Indonesian territory. A huge amount of infrastructure was destroyed, estimated to be around 80%. Those that survived struggled to feed and look after themselves and their families.

The United Nations organised a mission to conduct the vote. This body, UNAMET, was unarmed, and was specifically designed to set up voting centres and register voters. However, there was wide-ranging violence designed to impair the vote. Despite this, UNAMET managed to register 451,792 voters out of a population of around 800,000 in East Timor and abroad.

When the 1999 East Timorese independence referendum was held on 30 August 1999, some 98% of registered voters went to the polls. The result was markedly for a break with Indonesia, 78.5% of East Timorese chose independence from Indonesia. Immediately following this, the Indonesian military being resistant to the deployment of peacekeepers, some politicians involved on both sides, including Downer and Habibie, expected that there could have been a war between Indonesia and those countries supplying the peacekeeping forces.

Following the vote, there was a period where the Indonesian military resisted peacekeepers. However, continued diplomatic requests by John Howard, as well as covert U.S. pressure on the Indonesian military, saw Indonesia back down. On 12 September, Habibie said that Indonesia would accept peacekeepers.

East Timor devolved into violence following the 4 September 1999 ballot result, with the people overwhelmingly voting for independence. The Indonesian army declared martial law on 6 September, but also aided the militias who were causing the violence and destruction.

== Peacekeeping force ==
Australian Government representatives, in particular the Prime Minister and John Howard, used diplomacy to get support for peacekeepers and the peaceful governance of East Timor while it transitioned. The US military also made overtures to the Indonesian military that they needed to accept peacekeepers, and that the violence was unacceptable. In particular, pro Indonesia militia caused destruction, and much infrastructure, including school and university buildings, were destroyed. This took place during the APEC summit held in Auckland, where a lot of diplomatic action amongst the attendees saw more support for protecting the East Timorese from violence.

The Australian-led peacekeeping force, INTERFET arrived on 20 September 1999, though many people had been killed and much destruction had been done.

The lead-up to the operation remained politically and militarily tense. The Royal Australian Air Force (RAAF) re-deployed frontline combat aircraft—F/A-18s and F-111s—northward to Tindal in the Northern Territory to act as a deterrent against escalation of the conflict by the Indonesian military. On at least one occasion, Australian P-3C aircraft were intercepted by Indonesian aircraft, while an Indonesian submarine was also detected by Coalition surveillance within the vicinity of Dili Harbour as INTERFET forces approached. Ultimately no serious incidents occurred and the intervention was successful; however, Australia–Indonesia relations would take several years to recover.

Of the 22 nations involved in INTERFET, 10 provided naval vessels. Australia provided 14 ships with INTERFET between 19 September 1999 and 23 February 2000: the frigates Adelaide, Anzac, Darwin, Sydney, Newcastle, and Melbourne; the landing ship Tobruk, the landing craft Balikpapan, Brunei, Labuan, Tarakan, and Betano; the fast transport Jervis Bay; and the replenishment vessel Success. The United States contributed seven ships: the cruiser Mobile Bay; the amphibious assault ships Belleau Wood, Peleliu, and Juneau; and the replenishment ships Kilauea, San Jose, and Tippecanoe. France supplied four vessels: the frigates Vendémiaire and Prairial plus the landing ships Siroco and Jacques Cartier. Singapore contributed the amphibious landing ships Excellence, Intrepid, and Perseverance. New Zealand deployed the frigates Te Kaha and Canterbury and the replenishment ship Endeavour. Other naval vessels deployed during the operation included the Canadian replenishment ship Protecteur, the Italian amphibious assault ship San Giusto, the Portuguese frigate Vasco da Gama, the Thai landing ship Surin, and the British destroyer Glasgow.

The International Forces East Timor (INTERFET) coalition began deploying to East Timor on 20 September 1999, as a non-UN force operating in accordance with UN Resolutions. Australia led the operation and contributed 5,500 personnel and the force commander, Major General Peter Cosgrove. It was tasked with restoring peace and security, protecting and supporting UNAMET, and facilitating humanitarian assistance. The Australian Deployable Joint Force Headquarters provided overall command and control. The main Australian combat element included infantry and cavalry provided by the 3rd Brigade. Due to the nature of the operation the force deployed without its artillery and other heavy weapons and equipment; however, 105 mm and 155 mm guns and Leopard tanks were available and on standby in Darwin for rapid deployment if required. It was supported by the 3rd Combat Engineer Regiment, 103rd Signals Squadron, 110th Signals Squadron, and elements of the 3rd Brigade Administrative Support Battalion. Twelve Black Hawk helicopters from the 5th Aviation Regiment were also deployed. Other force level troops included military police, an intelligence company, an electronic warfare squadron, elements of an artillery locating battery, and topographic survey personnel.

Special forces played a key role, with an Australian squadron from the Special Air Service Regiment (SASR), a troop from the New Zealand Special Air Service (NZSAS) and a troop from the British Special Boat Service (SBS) forming Response Force (RESPFOR). An advance party of Gurkhas from the 2nd Battalion, The Royal Gurkha Rifles (2 RGR) and British Royal Marines Commandos from the Fleet Standby Rifle Troop (FSRT) secured the foothills and areas to the south of the city. 3rd Battalion, Royal Australian Regiment (3 RAR) began landing the next day at the port, along with the 2nd Cavalry Regiment equipped with ASLAV light armoured vehicles and the remainder of the Company Group from 2 RGR arrived. No. 2 Airfield Defence Squadron (2AFDS) arrived the following day to permanently secure Komoro airport replacing 2 RAR. Additional Australian forces and support personnel arrived in the days that followed as INTERFET continued to grow, as did forces from a number of other countries, in particular from New Zealand.

Most United Nations Mission in East Timor (UNAMET) personnel had already been evacuated from the region in the preceding months by the Royal Australian Air Force, although a small number had remained behind. With the withdrawal of the Indonesian forces and officials, UNAMET re-established its headquarters in Dili on 28 September and on 19 October 1999, Indonesia formally recognised the result of the independence referendum. Soon after, the United Nations Transitional Administration in East Timor (UNTAET) was established as a peacekeeping operation which was also fully responsible for the administration of East Timor to oversee its transition to independence. With only limited forces available, Cosgrove adopted the 'oil spot' concept of dominating key areas from which the surrounding areas could be influenced and then secured, moving quickly by helicopter to keep the militia off balance. The large airfield at Baucau was secured by two platoons from 2 RAR on 22 September, who were relieved by the Philippine Army non-combat contingent known as the Philippine Humanitarian Support Mission to East Timor (PhilHSMET) three days later.

INTERFET saw a number of engagement with Militia, in which there were casualties on both sides. On 28 February 2000, INTERFET handed over command of military operations to United Nations Transitional Administration in East Timor (UNTAET). The force suffered one battle death, a New Zealand private shot dead in an engagement with Indonesian forces/militia.

== UNTAET ==
On 19 October 1999, the Indonesian Government, formally recognized the result of the vote. On 25 October, the United Nations Security Council, created UNTAET (The United Nations Transitional Administration in East Timor). This was an armed peacekeeping operation that would be responsible for the administration of East Timor during its transition to an independence state. It would provide law, order and public administration during this period.

Various countries supplied personnel for UNTAET. Australia led the forces, and provided the largest contingent as well as providing the out of theatre base for operations. Portugal sent the second largest contingent securing the key central areas of the country, followed by New Zealand, who took responsibility for the southern West sector with supporting troops from Ireland, Fiji, Nepal, and Singapore. France also sent special forces who joined the ANZACs on the first day, as well as contingents from Philippines, Sweden, Brazil, Kenya, Japan, Malaysia, Singapore, South Korea, Thailand, Canada, Denmark, Italy, and the United Kingdom. The United States supported the transition authority, however didn't supply personnel, their main involvement being to underwrite contracts for replacing infrastructure that and been destroyed by the militia's and Indonesian military. The United States supplied police officers to serve with the International Police.

A National Consultative Council was established in December 1999 by UNTAET REG 1999/2, and served as a forum for East Timorese political and community leaders to advise the Transitional Administrator and discuss policy issues. The council had eleven Timorese members and four international members. A Transitional Judicial Service Commission was also established to ensure representation of East Timorese leaders in decisions affecting the judiciary in East Timor. The commission was made up of three Timorese representatives and two international experts. Security was initially provided by the International Force for East Timor (INTERFET) but was assumed by UNTAET Peace-Keeping Force (PKF) in February 2000. Law and order was maintained by a United Nations Civilian Police Force (CIVPOL) until an East Timorese Police Service was established in April 2000.

In July 2000, the membership of the National Consultative Council was expanded to 36 members, including one representative from each of the 13 districts of East Timor. The body was renamed the National Council. All the members were now Timorese and represented the main political parties and religious communities of East Timor. The National Council became a legislature style body and had the right to debate any future regulations issued by UNTAET. This was followed by the establishment of an executive body, the Transitional Cabinet of East Timor, was formed comprising four international members. four Timorese members, Following this, a judicial system was established with a Prosecutor General's Office and a Defender Service established. District Courts and Court of Appeal were also established. In September 2000, the Transitional Cabinet approves the establishment of an East Timor Defence Force. The force was formally established in February 2001 and the guerrilla movement FALINTIL was officially disbanded with many of its members joining the new force.

A voter registration process was completed during this period and preparations were made for elections to a Constituent Assembly that would prepare East Timor for independence expected in 2002.

In a 2001 article for the Asian Journal of Political Science, Anthony L. Smith writes of the UN mission in East Timor, "Despite the evident flaws in the operation, there is little doubt that the UN played an essential role in restoring peace and stability to East Timor. Even its most controversial episode, the 1999 ballot and surrounding violence, in hindsight, can be seen as a success given the constraints of the international environment at the time."

== Independence ==
In the leadup to the date for independence, there were ongoing diplomatic spats. Six naval vessels appeared in East Timorese territorial waters on Friday, May 17. The official reason give for this was to protect President Megawati Sukarnoputri who was attending the ceremony, although thousands of UN soldiers in East Timor had guaranteed her security. The East Timorese interim government conditionally granted permission for the Indonesian landing ship Teluk Sampit to enter the port of Dili; however, it had 120 armed soldiers on board instead of the previously nominated 15. Because of this, the ship therefore left the harbour again to anchored a few hundred meters off the coast.

Dili's Bishop, Nobel Peace Prize Laureate Carlos Filipe Ximenes Belo, on Sunday May 19 celebrated a Mass at his residence at 7 a.m. All members of the future government and the National Parliament were invited to the service. The flag of Timor-Leste was blessed, and raised at midnight. Delegations representing countries form all over the world arrived during the day, including former US President Bill Clinton, Angola's Foreign Minister João Bernardo de Miranda, Australian Prime Minister John Howard, Brazilian Foreign Minister Celso Lafer, Mozambique's President Joaquim Chissano, Portuguese Prime Minister José Manuel Barroso and President Jorge Sampaio and New Zealand's Prime Minister Helen Clark. UN Secretary General Kofi Annan landed in the capital Dili in the afternoon. A total of 300 guests of honour from 90 different countries attended the independence ceremony.

At 1 pm East Timorese protested over the dispute over the demarcation line against Australia in front of the old town market. Following that, the opening of the “Expo Esperança” (“Exhibition of Hope”) took place there, with Prime Minister John Howard and East Timorese Chief Minister and Prime Minister-designate Marí Bin Amude Alkatiri. At 5:45 pm Kofi Annan opened the Parque de Paz (Peace Park) in Lecidere.

In the three weeks leading up to Independence Day, a statue of the Virgin Mary, brought from Fátima in Portugal by Bishop Belo, travelled around the country. Timor-Leste, being largely a Catholic state, was dedicated to the Our Lady of Fátima on Independence Day. The statue is now in Dili Cathedral.

Timor-Leste officially regained independence on 20 May 2002 after three years under the United Nations Interim Administration for East Timor (UNTAET). From Timor-Leste's perspective, this was the re-establishment of national independence, following the proclamation of independence from Portugal on November 28, 1975, and the Indonesian occupation nine days later. May 20 is a national holiday in Timor-Leste as Independence Day or "Day of Restoration of Independence".

== The ceremony ==
At 6:00 p.m., a mass was held on the grounds of the celebrations in Tasitolu. At 9:30 p.m. the official ceremony for the start of independence began. Many East Timorese people in traditional costume with headdresses, swords (surik) and colourful Tais fabrics attended, and as part of the ceremony, there were folklore performances and traditional ceremonies.

The 13 districts and the island of Atauro were also represented, as was the creation legend of the good crocodile, from which the island of Timor is said to have emerged. The commemoration of the FRETILIN martyrs of the war against the Indonesian occupation was introduced with the poem Um minuto do silêncio by the national poet Francisco Borja da Costa. Hundreds of candles were carried onto the fairground and a traditional funeral song was sung. The images shown in the television broadcast included photos of well-known fallen Timorese fighters, photos of the Australian Balibo Five, and the memorial site for the massacre in Aileu in 1942. The former FALINTIL fighters then moved in. At around 11:20 p.m., the East Timorese Nobel Peace Prize winner José Ramos-Horta welcomed those present and the future President of Timor-Leste Xanana Gusmão and Megawati, who were demonstratively arriving together. Other folkloric performances followed.

The formal ceremony of the transfer of power from the United Nations to the new East Timorese government began with a speech by Han Seung-soo, President of the United Nations General Assembly. This was followed by the speech by UN Secretary-General Kofi Annan, which he said “Parabens, Boa Sorte, e obrigado barak! Viva Timor Leste!' ('All the best, good luck and thank you! Long live Timor-Leste!') ended exactly at midnight. Gusmão joined Annan at the lectern and Annan explained "As Secretary-General of the United Nations, I am honoured to transfer executive authority of the United Nations Interim Administration (UNTAET) to the institutions of the Democratic Republic of Timor-Leste."

== See also ==
- Australia and the Indonesian occupation of East Timor
- East Timor (province)
- Indonesian invasion of East Timor
- International Force for East Timor
- Separatism in Indonesia
