= Unilateral (disambiguation) =

Unilateral may refer to:

- Unilateralism, any doctrine or agenda that supports one-sided action
- Unilateral, occurring on only one side of an organism (Anatomical terms of location § Medial and lateral)
- Unilateral contract, a contract in which only one party makes a promise
- Unilateral declaration of independence
- Unilateral, a type of amplifier (Amplifier § Unilateral or bilateral)
