= Hotel Timor =

Hotel in Timor-Leste

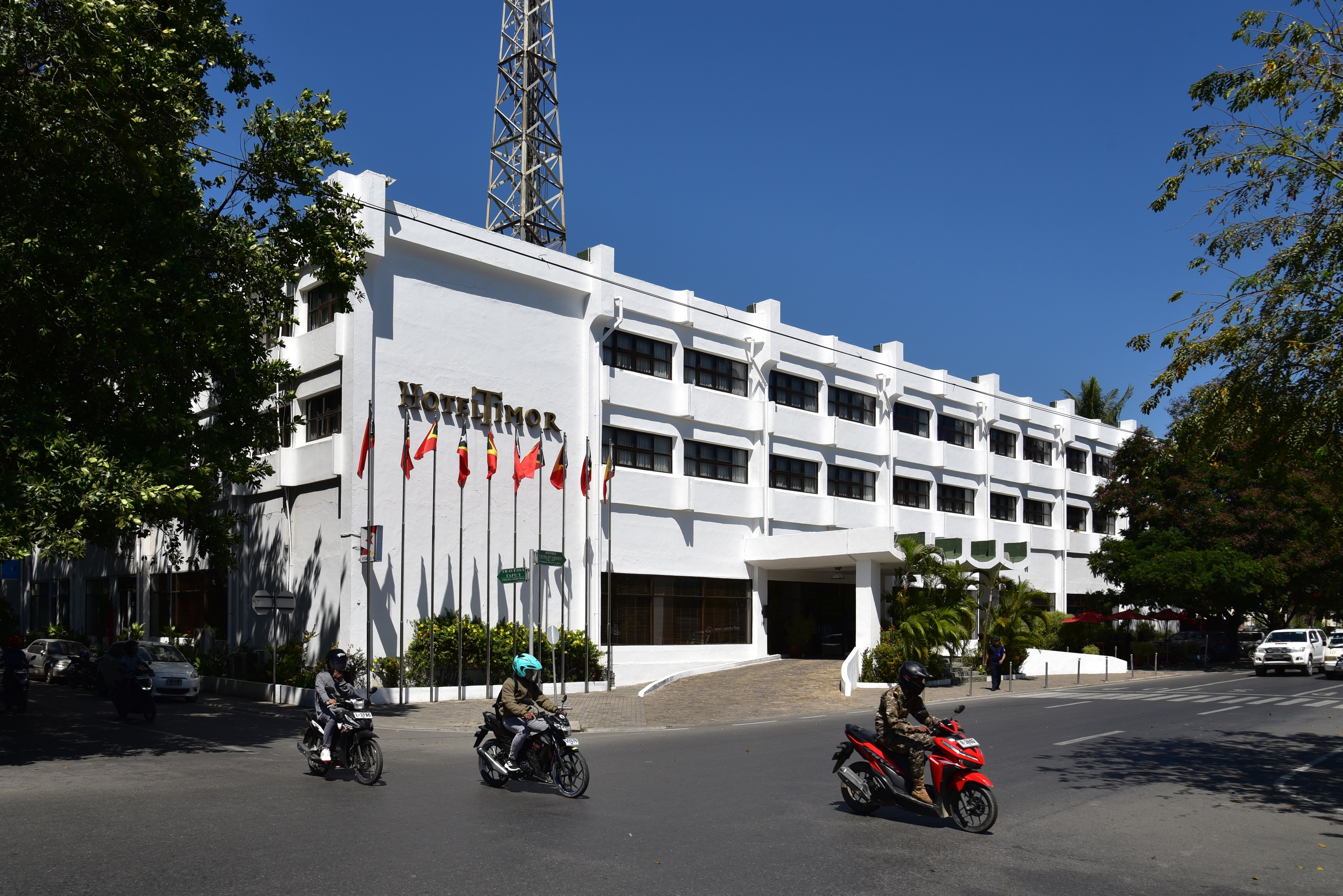
Hotel Timor in 2023

Hotel Timor is a hotel in the centre of Timor-Leste's capital, Dili. It is thought to be one of the oldest hotels in the city.

== History ==
The current business is on the previous site of the Hotel Mahkota, which was built by businessman Lay San Ying along with Macau tycoon Stanley Ho. It opened in 1976. The Mahkota operated continuously until September 1999, when the hotel, which housed many foreign media covering conflict in the country, was attacked and then burned down by pro-Indonesian militias.

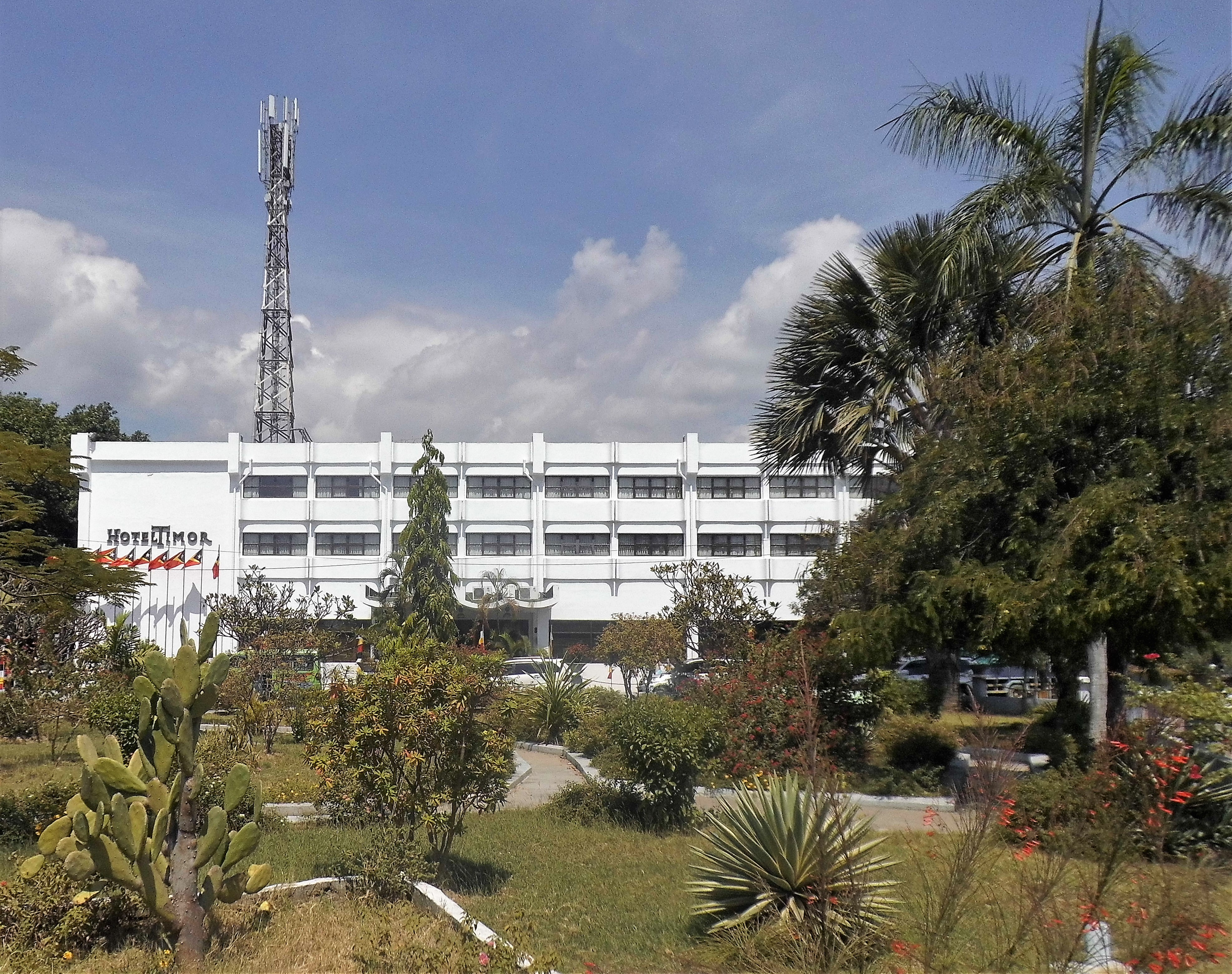
Hotel Timor in 2018.

In order to be able to offer state guests adequate accommodation for the celebrations of Timor-Leste's independence in 2002, the restoration of the hotel began. Fundação Oriente and the Timor-Leste government shared the cost of $6 million. Guests included Lula da Silva, Kofi Annan, Bill Clinton, Ban Ki-moon, António Guterres, Mahathir Mohamad, John Howard, Tony Blair and Gordon Brown.

The hotel was a site for key meetings during the 2006 East Timorese crisis.
