= Provisional Government of East Timor =

Pro-Indonesian puppet government (1975–76)

Provisional Government of East Timor: Pemerintah Sementara Timor Timur (Indonesian); Governo Provisório de Timor Leste (Portuguese)
- 1975–1976
- Flag

- East Timor in South East Asia
- Status: Unrecognised state; puppet government of Indonesia
- Capital: Dili
- Common languages: Indonesian
- Government: Provisional government
- Chief Executive
  - 1975–1976: Arnaldo dos Reis Araújo
- Deputy Chief Executive
  - 1975–1976: Francisco Xavier Lopes da Cruz
- Historical era: Cold War
  - Indonesian invasion: 7 December 1975
  - Provisional government formed: 17 December 1975
  - Annexed by Indonesia: 17 July 1976
- ISO 3166 code: TL
Preceded by	Succeeded by
Democratic Republic of East Timor (1975)	East Timor (province)

The Provisional Government of East Timor (PGET; Indonesian: Pemerintah Sementara Timor Timur (PSTT), Portuguese: Governo Provisório de Timor Leste), was an Indonesian supported provisional government in present day East Timor that was formed on 17 December 1975 following the Indonesian invasion of East Timor and disbanded on 17 July 1976 when the region was annexed by Indonesia as the province of Timor Timur.

== History ==
=== Decolonisation and unilateral declaration of independence ===
East Timor was colonised by Portugal in the mid-16th century and administered as Portuguese Timor. After the 1974 Carnation Revolution in Portugal, a decolonisation process was initiated which was to have led to the formation of an elected Constituent Assembly in 1976. Three new parties emerged at this time; the Timorese Democratic Union which advocated continued association with Portugal, Fretilin which supported independence and Apodeti who supported integration into Indonesia. In local elections held on 13 March 1975, Fretilin and UDT emerged as the largest parties, having previously formed an alliance to campaign for independence.

On 28 November 1975, Fretilin made a unilateral declaration of independence of the Democratic Republic of East Timor in an act not recognised by either Portugal or Indonesia.

=== Indonesian invasion and annexation ===
On 30 November 1975, In response to the unilateral declaration of Independence Indonesia encouraged leaders of the UDT, Apodeti, and other smaller parties to sign the Balibo Declaration calling for integration of East Timor into Indonesia. On the morning of 7 December 1975, Indonesian forces launched a massive air and sea invasion of East Timor, known as Operasi Seroja (Operation Lotus) capturing Dili later that afternoon.

On 17 December an Indonesian supported Provisional Government of East Timor was formed with by Arnaldo dos Reis Araújo of Apodeti as Chief Executive and Lopez da Cruz of the UDT as Deputy Chief Executive. On 31 May 1976 a Popular Representative Assembly was established which subsequently adopted a resolution calling for the formal integration of East Timor into Indonesia, which the Indonesian Government described as "an act of self-determination" for East Timor.

On 17 July 1976, Indonesia through Presidential Decree RI No. 113 of 1976, Law no. 7 of 1976 and MPR Decree No. VI/MPR/1978, formally annexed East Timor as the province of Timor Timur with PGET President Arnaldo dos Reis Araújo becoming its first governor.

== Balibo Declaration and Petition for Integration ==
=== Balibo Declaration ===
The "Balibo Declararion" was signed by representatives of Apodeti, UDT, KOTA and the Trabalhista Party on 30 November 1975.

Indonesian

Kami rakyat Timor Portugis, yang diwakili oleh APODETI - Associação Popular Democrática Timorense, UDT - União Democrática Timorense, KOTA - Klibur Oan Timor Asu’wain dan Partido Trabalhista, setelah mempertimbangkan dengan seksama aksi Fretilin yang terwujud melalui "Proklamasi kemerdekaan" mengenai wilayah Timor Portugis, yang dinyatakan disetujui oleh Pemerintah Portugis, kenyataan-kenyataan semacam itu bertentangan dengan keinginan nyata dari rakyat Timor Portugis.

- Menimbang bahwa persyaratan untuk menentukan nasib sendiri secara bebas rakyat Timor Portugis tidak sesuai dengan tindakan tersebut.
- Mengingat kenyataan, bahwa inisiatif telah ditempuh untuk memperoleh penyelesaian secara damai dalam masalah Timor Timur, terutama:
  - Pertemuan Macao, dimana dengan sengaja Fretilin tidak hadir walaupun Pemerintah Portugis mengundang wakil mereka.
  - Kesediaan Pemerintah Australia untuk mengusahakan keadaan yang memungkinkan bagi pembicaraan tentang masalah Timor di wilayahnya.
  - Pertemuan Roma untuk saling konsultasi antara Menteri-Menteri Luar Negeri Portugis dan Indonesia yang telah menghasilkan memorandum saling pengertian antara kedua negara.
  - Usaha yang dilakukan Pemerintah Republik Indonesia dengan kedatangan Menlu Adam Malik ke daerah perbatasan untuk menyampaikan semangat pertemuan Roma.
- Akibatnya tercapailah kesimpulan, bahwa Fretilin dengan sengaja tidak mau tahu usaha-usaha tersebut.
- Tambahan lagi Fretilin telah menunjukkan sikap salah, bahwa tindakan kriminalitasnya telah menghalangi rakyat Timor Portugis untuk menyatakan kehendak berdasarkan hukum yang sah.
- Mengingat suasana disebabkan oleh Fretilin dengan menyatakan sepihak kemerdekaan Timor Portugis telah menggagalkan segala kemungkinan ke arah pemecahan damai seperti diinginkan oleh rakyat.
- Merasakan bahwa aksi kolonialis Portugis dan Belanda yang selama hampir 500 tahun telah memisahkan hubungan darah, ikatan moral bangsa dan kebudayaan antara bangsa Indonesia dan Timor Portugis.
- Mengingat bahwa saat ini adalah kesempatan yang paling baik menyambungkan secara kukuh hubungan tradisi bangsa Indonesia.

Atas nama Tuhan Yang Maha Esa, dan dengan alasan-alasan di atas, kami dengan khidmat menyatakan penyatuan seluruh wilayah bekas koloni Portugis di Timor dengan negara Indonesia. Proklamasi ini adalah pernyataan yang paling sungguh dari keinginan rakyat Timor Portugis.

Berhubungan dengan isi dari Proklamasi penyatuan ini, Pemerintah Indonesia dan rakyat Indonesia diminta untuk mengambil langkah-langkah yang perlu untuk melindungi kehidupan rakyat, yang ingin merupakan bagian Bangsa Indonesia, yang berada di bawah teror dan fasis yang dilakukan oleh Fretilin dan direstui oleh Portugis.

English translation

We, the people of Portuguese Timor, represented by APODETI - Associação Popular Democrática Timorense, UDT - União Democrática Timorense, KOTA - Klibur Oan Timor Asu'wain and Partido Trabalhista, after carefully considering the Fretilin actions that were realized through the "Proclamation of independence" regarding the territory of Portuguese Timor., which was stated to be approved by the Portuguese Government, such facts contradicted the real will of the people of Portuguese Timor.

- Considering that the requirement for the free self-determination of the people of Portuguese Timor is incompatible with this act.
- In view of the fact that initiatives have been taken to obtain a peaceful settlement of the East Timor issue, in particular:
  - Macao meeting, where Fretilin deliberately did not attend even though the Portuguese Government invited their representatives.
  - The willingness of the Australian Government to provide conditions that allow for discussion of the Timor issue on its territory.
  - The Rome meeting for mutual consultation between the Portuguese and Indonesian Ministers of Foreign Affairs which has resulted in a memorandum of understanding between the two countries.
  - The efforts made by the Government of the Republic of Indonesia with the arrival of Foreign Minister Adam Malik to the border areas to convey the spirit of the Rome meeting.
- As a result, the conclusion was reached that Fretilin deliberately did not want to know about these efforts.
- In addition, Fretilin has shown the wrong attitude that its criminal acts have prevented the people of Portuguese Timor from expressing their will under the law.
- In view of the atmosphere caused by Fretilin by unilaterally declaring the independence of Portuguese Timor, it had thwarted all possibilities towards a peaceful solution as desired by the people.
- Feeling that the actions of the Portuguese and Dutch colonialists which for almost 500 years have separated the blood relations, moral ties of the nation and culture between the Indonesian people and Portuguese Timor.
- Given that now is the best opportunity to firmly connect the traditional relations of the Indonesian nation.

In the name of God Almighty, and for the reasons above, we solemnly declare the unification of the entire territory of the former Portuguese colony in Timor with the Indonesian state. This proclamation is the most solemn statement of the will of the people of Portuguese Timor.

In relation to the contents of the Proclamation of unification, the Government of Indonesia and the Indonesian people are asked to take the necessary steps to protect the lives of the people, who wish to be part of the Indonesian Nation, who are under terror and fascism carried out by Fretilin and sanctioned by the Portuguese.

=== Petition for integration ===
Text of the Provisional Government of East Timor's petition for annexation of East Timor into Indonesia

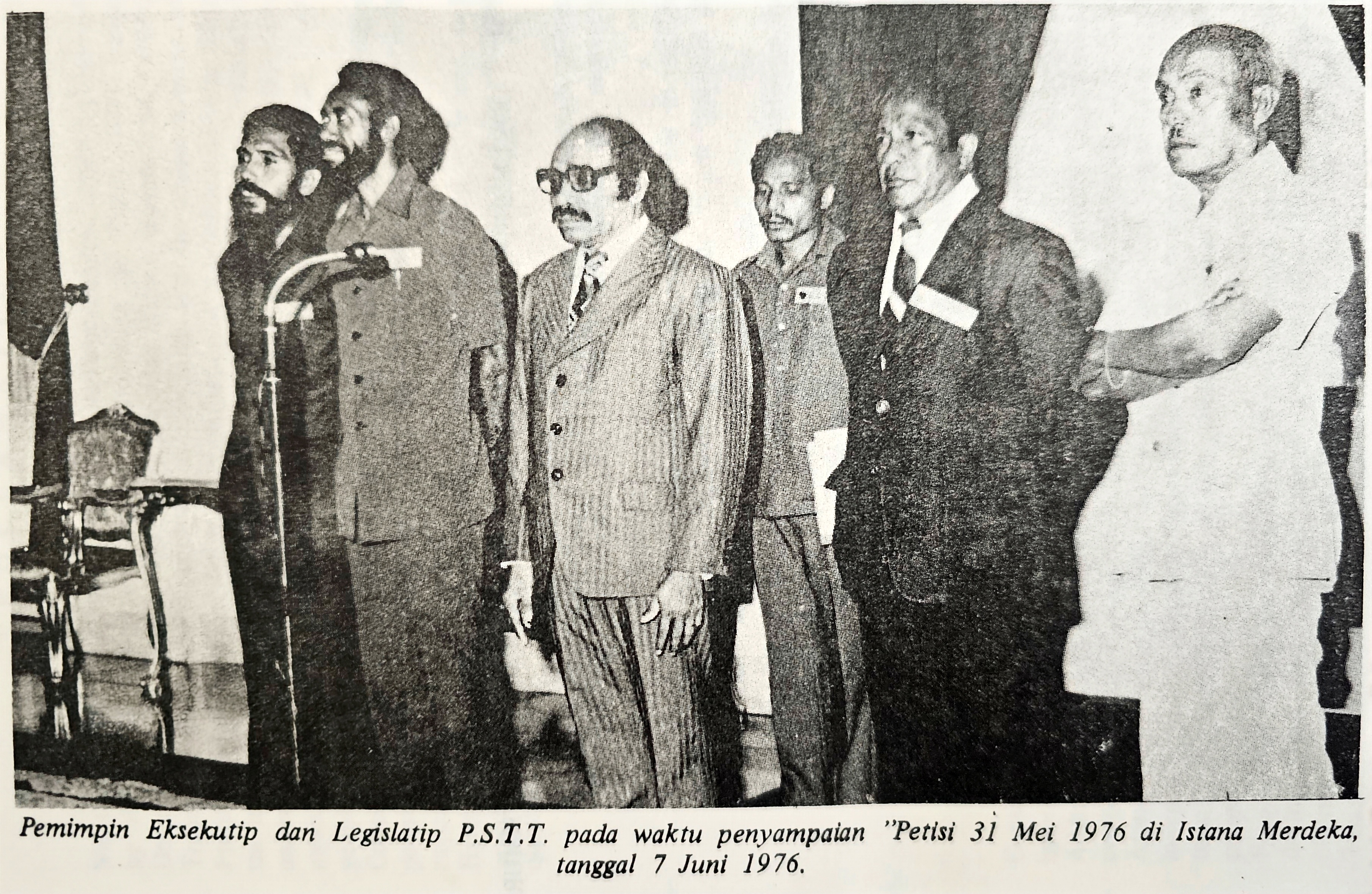
Submission of the petition of annexation to Indonesia by the representatives of the PGET (1976)

The Provisional Government of East Timor made the following petition for the region to join Indonesia on 31 May 1976:

With the blessing of God, Almighty, we, on behalf of the entire people of East Timor, in witness of the Resolution passed by the open and Plenary Session of the Popular Representative Assembly of the Territory of East Timor on 31st May 1976 in Dili, which in fact constitutes a realization of the aspiration of the people of East Timor as inscribed in the Proclamation of the integration of East Timor on the 30th day of November 1975 in the town of Balibo, do hereby resolve to urge the Government of the Republic of Indonesia to accept, in the shortest possible time, and to undertake constitutional measures for the full integration of the people and territory of East Timor into the unitary state of the Republic of Indonesia without any referendum.

Done at the city of Dili on the 31st of May 1976

The Chief Executive of the Provisional Government of East Timor

Arnaldo dos Reis Araújo

Chairman of the Popular Representative Assembly

Guilherme M. Gonçalves

== Structure ==
=== Leadership ===
Chief Executive of the Provisional Government of East Timor

No.	Name	Portrait	Term of office		Party
1	Arnaldo dos Reis Araújo		17 December 1975	17 July 1976	Apodeti

Deputy Chief Executive of the Provisional Government of East Timor

No.	Name	Portrait	Term of office		Party
1	Francisco Xavier Lopes da Cruz		17 December 1975	17 July 1976	UDT

=== Popular Representative Assembly of East Timor ===
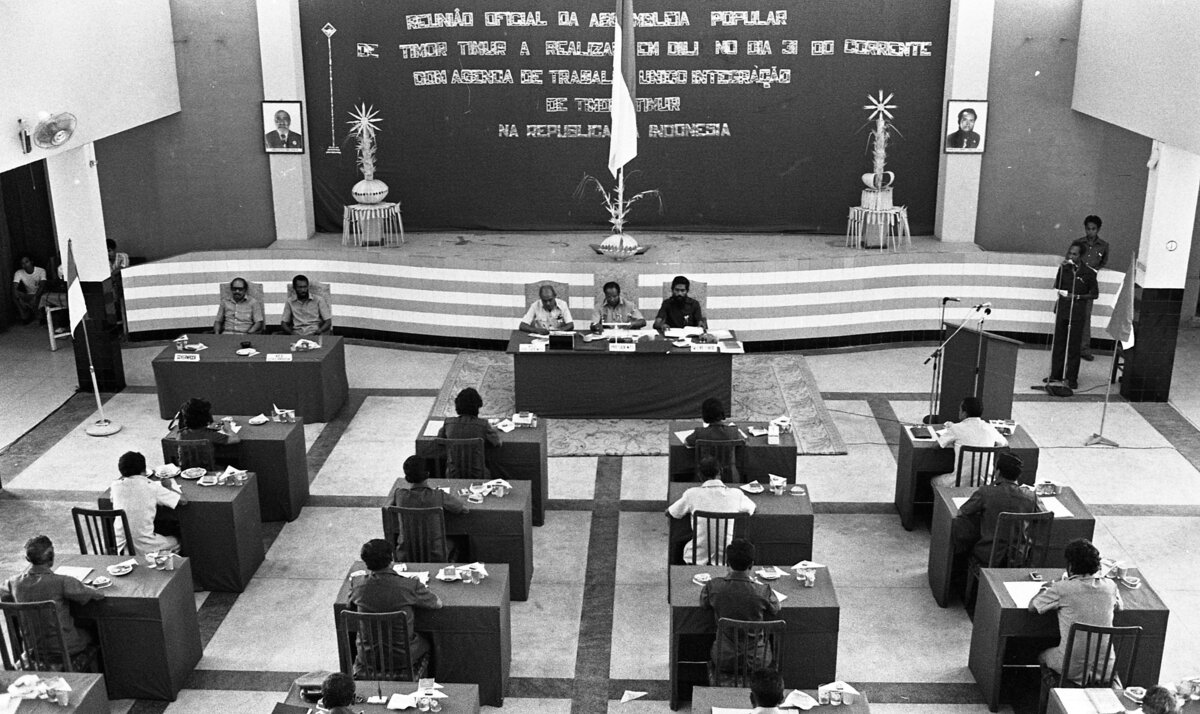
Popular Representative Assembly of East Timor in session

A Deliberative Council was formed at the same time as the PGET in 1975. A Popular Representative Assembly of East Timor (Indonesian: Dewan Perwakilan Rakyat Walayah Timor Timur) was formed on 31 May 1976 by Act Number 1/1976 of the Provisional Government of East Timor. The Assembly had 50 members included representatives from the Deliberative Council and two members from each of the 13 municipalities of East Timor. Indonesia claimed the members included representatives and leaders from all walks of East Timorese life including prominent citizens, tribal chiefs religious leaders and municipal representatives. The chairman of the assembly was Guilherme Maria Gonçalves.

=== Municipal popular assemblies ===
Each municipality in East Timor had a popular assembly of between 15 and 20 members.

== International relations ==
The Provisional Government of East Timor maintained a liaison office in Jakarta, Indonesia. The office was led by Mário Viegas Carrascalão. Correspondence from the Provisional Government of East Timor to the United Nations was conveyed by the Government of Indonesia.
