= 1975 Council of Ministers of East Timor =

East Timorese cabinet led by Nicolau dos Reis Lobato

1975 Council of Ministers
- Inaugural (Fretilin) cabinet of East Timor

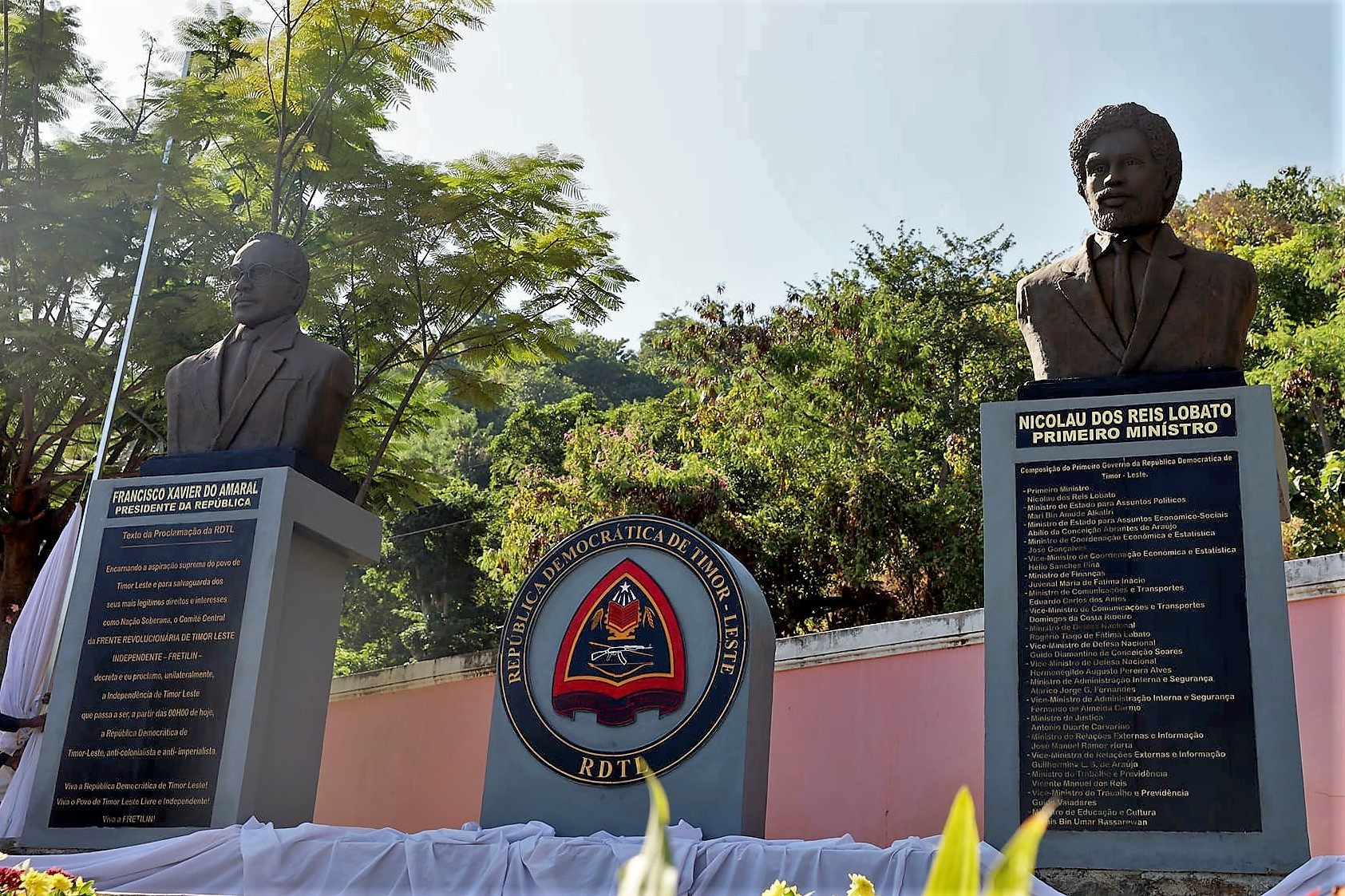
- Memorial to the Council of Ministers in 2022
- Date formed: 1 December 1975

People and organisations
- President: Francisco Xavier do Amaral
- Prime Minister: Nicolau dos Reis Lobato
- Member parties: Fretilin

History
- Predecessor: Portuguese colonial government
- Successor: Indonesian occupied East Timor; (1976–1999); I UNTAET Transitional Government; (2000)

The 1975 Council of Ministers (Portuguese: Conselho de Ministros, Tetum: Konsellu Ministrus) was the council of ministers formed by the Fretilin political party in 1975 as the inaugural administration or cabinet of the Democratic Republic of East Timor proclaimed in November 1975.

== History ==
On 28 November 1975, Fretilin made a unilateral declaration of independence of East Timor from Portuguese colonial rule. On 30 November 1975, the party caused a "Constitution of the Democratic Republic of Timor-Leste (RDTL)" to be read out at an inauguration ceremony for Francisco Xavier do Amaral as the newly appointed President of its new republic.

Article 40 of the new constitution provided for the establishment of a Council of Ministers. On 1 December 1975, Fretilin inaugurated that body.

By that time, however, Indonesian armed forces had infiltrated significant parts of the territory of East Timor, especially in what is now the Bobonaro Municipality, adjacent to the border with Indonesian West Timor. Just under a week later, on 7 December 1975, Indonesia began a full-scale invasion of East Timor, focused on Dili, the capital of the territory.

On 17 December 1975, Indonesia then brought about a de facto usurpation of Fretilin's Council of Ministers, by forming a Provisional Government of East Timor (PGET) (Indonesian: Pemerintah Sementara Timor Timur (PSTT)) headed by Arnaldo dos Reis Araújo of the Timorese Popular Democratic Association (Portuguese: Associação Popular Democratica Timorense, APODETI) and Francisco Lopes da Cruz of the Timorese Democratic Union (Portuguese: União Democrática Timorense, UDT).

== Composition ==
The Council of Ministers was made up of Ministers and Vice Ministers, as follows:

=== Ministers ===
Party	Minister	Portrait	Portfolio
Fretilin	Nicolau Lobato		Prime Minister
Independent	José Gonçalves		Minister of Economic Coordination and Statistics
Fretilin	Juvenal Maria de Fátima Inácio Sera Key		Minister of Finance
Fretilin	Eduardo Carlos dos Anjos Kaku'uk		Minister of Public Works, Transport and Communications
Fretilin	Rogério Lobato		Minister of National Defense
Fretilin	Alarico Fernandes		Minister of Information, Home Affairs and Security
Fretilin	António Duarte Carvarino Mau Lear		Minister of Justice
Fretilin	José Ramos-Horta		Minister of Foreign Affairs
Fretilin	Vicente dos Reis Bie Ky Sahe		Minister of Labor
Fretilin	Hamis Bin Umar Bassarewan Hata		Minister of Education and Culture
Fretilin	Mari Alkatiri		Minister of Political Affairs
Fretilin	Abílio Araújo		Minister of Economic and Social Affairs

=== Vice Ministers ===
Party	Minister	Portrait	Portfolio
Fretilin	Hélio Sanches Pina Mau Kruma		Vice Minister of Economic Coordination and Statistics
Fretilin	Domingos da Costa Ribeiro		Vice Minister of Public Works, Transport and Communications
Fretilin	Hermenegildo Augusto Pereira Alves		Vice Minister of Defense
Fretilin	Guido Diamantino Soares Kakeu		Vice Minister of Defense
Fretilin	Fernando de Almeida do Carmo		Vice Minister of Information, Home Affairs and Security
Fretilin	Guilhermina L.S. de Araújo Bimali		Vice Minister of Foreign Affairs
Fretilin	Guido Valadares		Vice Minister of Labor and Social Welfare
Fretilin	Eduardo Ximenes		Vice Minister of Health

== See also ==
- Proclamation of Independence Day
