= Democratic Republic of East Timor (1975) =

Short-lived unilaterally proclaimed state

Democratic Republic of East Timor: República Democrática de Timor-Leste (Portuguese); Repúblika Demokrátika de Timór-Lorosa'e (Tetun)
- 1975–1976
- Flag Emblem
- Anthem: Pátria (Portuguese) "Fatherland"
- East Timor in South East Asia
- Status: Partially recognized state Overseas province of Portugal (de jure)
- Capital: Dili; 8.55°S 125.56°E
- Common languages: Portuguese
- Government: One-party quasi‑state (until Nov 1975) Democratic republic
- President
  - 1975: Francisco Xavier do Amaral
  - 1975: Nicolau dos Reis Lobato
- Prime Minister
  - 1975: Nicolau dos Reis Lobato
- Legislature: Council of Ministers
- Historical era: Cold War
  - Fretilin control started: 20 August 1975
  - Declaration of Independence: 28 November 1975
  - Indonesian invasion: 7 December 1975
- Currency: Escudo
- ISO 3166 code: TL
Preceded by	Succeeded by
Portuguese Timor	Provisional Government of East Timor

The Democratic Republic of East Timor (Portuguese: República Democrática de Timor-Leste, Tetun: Repúblika Demokrátika de Timór-Lorosa'e), or simply East Timor or Timor-Leste (Portuguese: Timor-Leste, Tetun: Timór-Lorosa'e) was a state that was unilaterally proclaimed on the territory of present-day Timor-Leste on 28 November 1975 by Fretilin prior to the Indonesian invasion of East Timor nine days later on 7 December 1975.

Its sovereignty was recognised by a small number of states, before it was invaded and subsequently annexed by Indonesia on 17 July 1976. Following continued resistance and growing international pressure, Timor-Leste became independent on 20 May 2002.

== History ==
=== Declaration of independence ===
East Timor was colonised by Portugal in the mid-16th century and administered as Portuguese Timor. After the 1974 Carnation Revolution in Portugal, a decolonisation process was initiated which was to have led to the formation of an elected Constituent Assembly in 1976. Three new parties emerged at this time: the Timorese Democratic Union, which advocated continued association with Portugal; Fretilin, which supported independence; and Apodeti, which supported integration into Indonesia. In local elections held on 13 March 1975, Fretilin and UDT emerged as the largest parties, having previously formed an alliance to campaign for independence.

On 11 August 1975, the UDT attempted a coup, in a bid to halt the increasing popularity of Fretilin. Portuguese Governor Mário Lemos Pires fled to the offshore island of Atauro, north of the capital, Dili, from where he later attempted to broker an agreement between the two sides.

On 28 November 1975, Fretilin made a unilateral declaration of independence of the Democratic Republic of East Timor with Francisco Xavier do Amaral as president and Nicolau dos Reis Lobato as prime minister. This act was not recognised by either Portugal or Indonesia.

On 30 November 1975, Fretilin caused a "Constitution of the Democratic Republic of Timor-Leste (RDTL)" to be read out at an inauguration ceremony for Amaral as the newly appointed president. Article 40 of the new constitution provided for the establishment of a Council of Ministers. On 1 December 1975, Fretilin established that body.

=== Indonesian invasion ===
In response, on 30 November 1975, Indonesia encouraged leaders of the UDT, Apodeti, and other smaller parties to sign the Balibo Declaration calling for integration of East Timor into Indonesia. On 7 December 1975, Indonesian forces launched a massive air and sea invasion, known as Operasi Seroja (Operation Lotus), citing the potential for a communist government, the need to develop the territory and national and regional security risks as reasons for its actions. Indonesian forces occupied the capital, Dili, within hours of launching the invasion during the Battle of Dili and occupied the second largest city, Baucau, on 10 December, with Liquisa and Maubara being occupied in late December.

=== Subsequent events ===
On 17 December an Indonesian-supported Provisional Government of East Timor (Pemerintah Sementara Timor Timur; PSTT) was formed which was led by Arnaldo dos Reis Araújo of Apodeti and Lopez da Cruz of the UDT. A Regional Popular Assembly was established on 31 May 1976, which subsequently adopted a resolution calling for the formal integration of East Timor into Indonesia. On 17 July 1976, Indonesia formally annexed East Timor as the province of Timor Timur with Arnaldo dos Reis Araújo as its first governor.

The United Nations did not recognise either the Democratic Republic of East Timor, proclaimed by Fretilin, or Indonesian sovereignty over East Timor and instead continued to recognise Portugal as the legal Administering Power as demonstrated by United Nations Security Council Resolution 384. This meant that in terms of international law Portuguese Timor nominally continued to exist. An agreement in 1999 between the governments of Portugal and Indonesia led to a referendum on 30 August 1999 in which a majority of the people of East Timor voted for independence. Following a transitional period of United Nations administration, East Timor became independent as the Democratic Republic of East Timor on 20 May 2002.

== Text of the Declaration of Independence ==
=== Text ===
In Portuguese:

Proclamação da República Democrática de Timor Leste

Encarnando a espiração suprema do povo de Timor Leste e para salvaguarda dos
seus mais legítimos direitos e interesses
como Nação Soberana, o Comité Central
da FRENTE REVOLUCIONÁRIA DE TIMOR LESTE
INDEPENDENTE – FRETILIN –
decreta e eu proclamo, unilateralmente,
a Independência de Timor Leste
que passa a ser, a partir das 00H00 de hoje,
a República Democrática de
Timor-Leste, anti-colonialista e anti-imperialista.

Viva a República Democrática de Timor Leste !

Viva o Povo de Timor Leste Livre e Independente !

Viva a FRETILIN !

In English:

Proclamation of the Democratic Republic of East Timor

Embodying the supreme aspiration of the people of East Timor and for safeguarding the
their most legitimate rights and interests
as a Sovereign Nation, the Central Committee
of the EAST TIMOR REVOLUTIONARY FRONT
INDEPENDENT – FRETILIN –
decrees and I proclaim, unilaterally,
the Independence of East Timor
which will be, as of 00:00 today,
the Democratic Republic of
Timor-Leste, anti-colonialist and anti-imperialist.

Long Live the Democratic Republic of East Timor!

Long Live the People of Free and Independent East Timor!

Long live the FRETILIN!

== Government ==
Following the declaration of independence a Council of Ministers was formed with Francisco Xavier do Amaral as president and Nicolau dos Reis Lobato as prime minister.

=== Presidents ===
No.	Portrait	Name (Birth–Death)	Elected	Term of office			Political party
No.	Portrait	Name (Birth–Death)	Elected	Took office	Left office	Time in office	Political party
1		Francisco Xavier do Amaral (1939–2012)	—	28 November 1975	7 December 1975	9 days	Fretilin
2		Nicolau dos Reis Lobato (1946–1978)	—	7 December 1975	31 December 1978	3 years, 24 days	Fretilin

=== Prime minister ===
No.	Portrait	Name (Birth–Death)	Election	Term of office			Political party
No.	Portrait	Name (Birth–Death)	Election	Took office	Left office	Time in office	Political party
1		Nicolau dos Reis Lobato (1946–1978)	—	28 November 1975	7 December 1975	9 days	Fretilin

== International relations ==
=== Diplomatic recognition ===
Following the declaration of independence of the Democratic Republic of East Timor, the state received diplomatic recognition from six mainly socialist states, most of them former Portuguese colonies.

The states that recognised the Democratic Republic of East Timor were as follows:

- Albania
- China
- Mozambique
- Guinea
- Guinea-Bissau
- Cape Verde
- São Tomé and Príncipe

=== Diplomatic representation ===
The Democratic Republic of East Timor maintained a liaison office in New York located at Apartment 608, 310 East 44th Street.
