= Pátria =

National anthem of Timor-Leste

English: Fatherland
- The national emblem of Timor-Leste
- National anthem of Timor-Leste
- Lyrics: Francisco Borja da Costa, 1975
- Music: Afonso Redentor Araújo, 1975
- Adopted: 28 November 1975
- Readopted: 20 May 2002
- Relinquished: 7 December 1975

Audio sample
- US Navy Band instrumental version: file; help

"Pátria" (English: "Fatherland") is the national anthem of Timor-Leste. It was originally adopted when East Timor unilaterally declared its independence from Portugal in 1975. However, this usage would be short-lived, when the country was invaded by Indonesia. It was officially re-adopted when the independence of Timor-Leste was finally restored in 2002 following a United Nations intervention.

The music was composed by Afonso Redentor Araújo, and the words were written by the poet Francisco Borja da Costa, who was killed by Indonesian forces at the time of the invasion. It was originally sung exclusively in Portuguese, however there is now a Tetun version.

== Legislation ==
The infraconstitutional officialisation and the forms of ceremony of uses of the state anthem are regulated by the Law of the National Symbols of Timor-Leste.

== Lyrics ==
Portuguese original

𝄆 Pátria, Pátria, Timor-Leste, nossa Nação.
Glória ao povo e aos heróis da nossa libertação. 𝄇

Vencemos o colonialismo, gritamos:
Abaixo o imperialismo.
Terra livre, povo livre,
Não, não, não à exploração.

Avante unidos firmes e decididos.
Na luta contra o imperialismo
O inimigo dos povos, até à vitória final.
Pelo caminho da revolução.

Portuguese IPA transcription (Note: See Help:IPA/Portuguese and Portuguese phonology.)

𝄆 [ˈpa.tɾjɐ | ˈpa.tɾjɐ | ti.ˈmoɾ ˈɫɛʃ.tɨ | ˈnɔ.sɐ nɐ.ˈsɐ̃w ǁ]
[ˈgɫɔ.ɾj‿aw ˈpo.vu i‿awz‿e.ˈɾɔjʃ dɐ ˈnɔ.sɐ ɫi.bɨɾ.tɐ.ˈsɐ̃w ‖] 𝄇

[vẽ.ˈse.muz‿u ku.ɫun.jɐ.ˈɫiʒ.mu | gɾi.ˈtɐ.muʃ |]
[ɐ.ˈbaj.ʃ‿u ĩ.pɨ.ɾ(i)jɐ.ˈɫiʒ.mu ‖]
[ˈtɛ.ʁɐ ˈɫiv.ɾɨ | ˈpo.vu ˈɫiv.ɾɨ |]
[nɐ̃w | nɐ̃w | nɐ̃w a‿iʃ.pɫu.ɾɐ.ˈsɐ̃w ‖]

[ɐ.ˈvɐ̃.tɨ u.ˈni.duʃ ˈfiɾ.mɨz‿i dɨ.sɨ.ˈdi.duʃ ‖]
[nɐ ˈɫu.tɐ ˈkõ.tɾɐ‿u ĩ.pɨ.ɾ(i)jɐ.ˈɫiʒ.mu]
[u‿i.ni.ˈmi.gu duʃ ˈpo.vuz‿ɐ.ˈtɛ a vi.ˈtɔ.ɾ(i)jɐ fi.ˈnaɫ ‖]
[ˈpe.ɫu kɐ.ˈmi.ɲu dɐ ʁɨ.vu.ɫu.ˈsɐ̃w ‖]

Tetun Dili lyrics

𝄆 Pátria, Pátria, Timór Lorosa'e, ita-nia Nasaun.
Glória ba Povu no ba ita-nia eróis libertasaun nasionál. 𝄇

Ita manán hasoru kolonializmu, ita hakilar:
Hatuun imperializmu.
Rai livre, Povu livre,
Lae, lae, lae ba esplorasaun.

Bá oin hamutuk, laran-metin no barani.
Halo funu hasoru imperializmu
Inimigu Povu hotu-hotu nian, to’o vitória finál
Liu dalan revolusaun.

English translation

𝄆 Fatherland, fatherland, Timor-Leste our Nation.
Glory to the people and to the heroes of our liberation. 𝄇

We vanquish colonialism, we cry:
down with imperialism!
Free land, free people,
No, no, no to exploitation.

Let us go forward, united, firm, and determined
In the struggle against imperialism,
enemy of the people, until final victory,
onward to revolution.
