= Nicolau Lobato =

East Timorese politician (1946–1978)

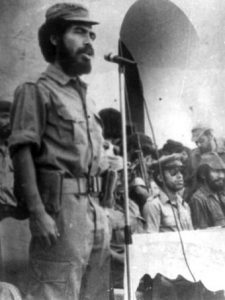
- Lobato in 1975

2nd President of East Timor
- In office 7 December 1975 – 31 December 1978
- Prime Minister: António Duarte Carvarino (1977–1979)
- Preceded by: Francisco Xavier do Amaral
- Succeeded by: Sérgio Vieira de Mello as UN Administrator (1999–2002); Xanana Gusmão (2002)

1st Prime Minister of East Timor
- In office 28 November 1975 – 7 December 1975
- President: Francisco Xavier do Amaral
- Preceded by: Position established
- Succeeded by: António Duarte Carvarino (1977)

Personal details
- Born: 24 May 1946 Soibada, Portuguese Timor
- Died: 31 December 1978 (aged 32) Mount Mindelo, East Timor, Indonesia
- Cause of death: Killed in action
- Party: Fretilin
- Spouse: Isabel Barreto Lobato (m. 1972; died 1975)
- Children: 1
- Parent(s): Narciso Lobato (father); Felismina Alves (mother)
- Relatives: Rogério Lobato (brother)

Military service
- Allegiance: Timor-Leste
- Years of service: 1975–1978
- Commands: Falintil
- Battles/wars: Indonesian occupation of East Timor †

Nicolau dos Reis Lobato (24 May 1946 – 31 December 1978) was an East Timorese politician who is considered a national hero of the country.

He was the first Prime Minister of East Timor and vice president of Fretilin. In 1978, he was killed by the Indonesian Kopassus during the country's invasion of East Timor.

== Biography ==
Lobato was born in Soibada, Portuguese Timor, on 24 May 1946.

Lobato was the first prime minister of the Democratic Republic of East Timor from 28 November to 7 December 1975. Upon the invasion by the Indonesian military, Lobato, along with other key Revolutionary Front for an Independent East Timor (Fretilin) leaders, fled into the Timorese hinterland to fight against the occupying forces. On 31 December 1978, Lobato was ambushed at Mount Mindelo and fatally shot in the stomach by the Kopassus, an Indonesian special forces unit then led by Lieutenant Prabowo Subianto (later president of Indonesia). His body was brought to Dili to be inspected by the Indonesian press. What then happened to his body is unknown; the East Timorese government continues to pursue the issue with the Indonesian government, so that his remains can be given a proper burial.

East Timor's main airport was renamed Presidente Nicolau Lobato International Airport in his honour.

Political offices
Preceded by Francisco Xavier do Amaral	President of East Timor; 1977–1978	Vacant Title next held by Xanana Gusmão
Office established	Prime Minister of East Timor; 1975	Vacant Title next held by Mari Alkatiri
