= Unilateral declaration of independence =

New state declaring itself independent without formal agreement with its parent state

A unilateral declaration of independence (UDI) or unilateral secession is a formal process leading to the establishment of a new state by a subnational entity which declares itself independent and sovereign without a formal agreement with the state from which it is seceding. The term was first used when Rhodesia declared independence in 1965 from the United Kingdom (UK) without an agreement with the UK.

== Examples ==
Prominent examples of a unilateral declaration of independence other than Rhodesia's UDI in 1965 include that of the United States in 1776, the Irish Declaration of Independence of 1919 by a revolutionary parliament, Katanga's declaration of independence by Moise Tshombe in July 1960, the attempted secession of Biafra from Nigeria in 1967, the Proclamation of Bangladeshi Independence from Pakistan in 1970, the secession of the Turkish Republic of Northern Cyprus from Cyprus in 1983, the Palestinian Declaration of Independence in 1988, and that of the Republic of Kosovo in 2008. During the dissolution of the Soviet Union, many of its republics declared their independence unilaterally without agreement and were thus not recognised as legitimate by the Soviet central government.

During the breakup of Yugoslavia, the government of the United States asked the governments of Croatia and Slovenia to drop their UDI plans because of the threat of major war erupting in the Balkans because of it, and threatened that it would oppose both countries' UDIs on the basis of the Helsinki Final Act if they did so. However, four days later both Slovenia and Croatia announced their UDIs from Yugoslavia.

Date	Declared state	Parent state	International recognition	Notes
1581	Dutch Republic	Spain	Yes	
1641	Catalonia	Spain	No	
1755	Corsica	Republic of Genoa	Partial	Recognized only by the Beylik of Tunis
1776	United States	Great Britain	Yes	
1777	Vermont	Great Britain	No	Vermont signed a separate armistice with Britain in 1781 before the surrender of Cornwallis at Yorktown. Effective retroactive recognition by the United States was granted in 1791 when Vermont became the 14th state.
1813	Cundinamarca	Spain	No	No other nation besides Venezuela, itself an unrecognised government at the time, recognised the independence of Cundinamarca. The nation was later incorporated by military force into the United Provinces of New Granada in 1814.
1813	New Granada	Spain	No	No other nation besides Venezuela, itself an unrecognised government at the time, recognised the independence of New Granada. The nation would later join together with Venezuela to form the Republic of Colombia.
1816	Río de la Plata	Spain	Yes	Became the Argentine Confederation in 1831. Recognised by Spain in 1859.
1819	Gran Colombia	Spain	Yes	Initially recognised by the United States (1822), the United Kingdom (1825), the Netherlands (1829) and various other Hispanic American nations between 1822 and 1831. Recognised by Spain in 1881.
1821	Mexico	Spain	Yes	
1821	Greece	Ottoman Empire	Yes	Intervention by France, Russia, and the United Kingdom in favour of Greece in the Greek War of Independence secured its independence in 1832.
1830	Belgium	United Netherlands	Yes	Recognized by major European powers following the London Conference of 20 December 1830.
1836	Texas	Mexico	Yes	
1846	California	Mexico	No	Became a U.S. state.
1860-1861	Confederate States	United States	No	Reconquered by the United States
1898	Philippines	(Spanish Empire) Spain	No	Conquered by the United States; became independent in 1946 by the Treaty of Manila.
1903	Panama	Colombia	Yes	
1912	Albania	Ottoman Empire	Yes	
1917	Finland	Soviet Russia	Yes	Recognized after White victory in the Finnish Civil War
1918	Estonia	Soviet Russia	Yes	Recognized after victory in the Estonian War of Independence
1918	Latvia	Soviet Russia	Yes	Recognized after victory in the Latvian War of Independence
1918	Lithuania	Soviet Russia	Yes	Recognized after victory in the Lithuanian Wars of Independence
1919	Irish Republic	United Kingdom	No	Became the Irish Free State upon the ratification of the Anglo-Irish Treaty.
1920	Karelia	Soviet Russia	No	
1921	Baranya–Baja	Hungary	No	
1921	Mirdita	Albania	Partial	Recognized only by Greece
1921	Rif	Spain	No	
1922	Egypt	United Kingdom	Yes	Unilateral grant of independence by the British government
1931	Jiangxi	China	No	
1931	Catalonia	Spain	No	Spanish sovereignty remained unchanged
1938	Carpatho-Ukraine	Czechoslovakia	No	
1941	Ukraine	Soviet Union	No	
1945	Indonesia	Netherlands	Yes	
1960	Katanga	Congo-Léopoldville	No	Breakaway Congolese province, secession forcibly ended by the United Nations Operation in the Congo in 1963.
1965	Rhodesia	United Kingdom	No	Self-governing British colony, unilaterally declared itself independent as Rhodesia in 1965, renamed Zimbabwe Rhodesia and returned to British control in 1979, then gained international recognition as Zimbabwe in 1980.
1967	Anguilla	United Kingdom	No	Returned as a British Crown Colony in 1969.
1967	Biafra	Nigeria	Partial	Recognized by five countries. Present-day Nigeria
1971	Bangladesh	Pakistan	Yes	
1971	West Papua	Indonesia	No	
1973	Guinea-Bissau	Portugal	Yes	
1975	North Solomons	Australia	No	Present-day Autonomous Region of Bougainville, Papua New Guinea
1975	Cabinda	Portugal	No	Present-day Angola
1975	East Timor	Portugal	No	Shortly following the declaration of independence, the territory was invaded and annexed by Indonesia. A referendum in 1999 led to eventual independence in 2002.
1983	Northern Cyprus	Cyprus	Partial	Still claimed by Cyprus, and recognized as such by all UN member-states except for Turkey, which recognizes Northern Cyprus instead.
1988	Palestine	Israel	Partial	Claims territories occupied by Israel since 1967; Israeli–Palestinian conflict and peace process still ongoing See: International recognition of the State of Palestine
1988	West Papua	Indonesia	No	
1990	Latvia	Soviet Union	Yes	After the failed 1991 Soviet coup attempt, the Soviet Union recognized Latvia's independence.
1990	Lithuania	Soviet Union	Yes	After the failed 1991 Soviet coup attempt, the Soviet Union recognized Lithuania's independence.
1990	Namibia	South Africa	Yes	
1990	Karakalpakstan	Uzbekistan	No	Incorporated into Uzbekistan in 1993.
1991	Estonia	Soviet Union	Yes	
1991	Somaliland	Somalia	Partial	Still claimed by Somalia. Recognized by Israel since 2026.
1991	Croatia	Yugoslavia	Yes	Set off Croatian War of Independence
1991	Slovenia	Yugoslavia	Yes	Set off Ten-Day War
1991	Ichkeria	Soviet Union	Partial	Present-day Chechnya, part of Russia. Retroactively recognized by Ukraine in 2022
1991	Transnistria	Moldova	Partial	Still claimed by Moldova, recognized by 2 partially unrecognised breakaway states South Ossetia and Abkhazia (+ the former Nagorno-Karabakh Republic).
1991	Nagorno-Karabakh	Azerbaijan	No	Recognized by 3 partially unrecognised breakaway states South Ossetia, Abkhazia and Transnistria between 1991 and 2023. Incorporated back into Azerbaijan as aftermath of Second Nagorno-Karabakh War and 2023 Azerbaijani offensive in Nagorno-Karabakh.
1991	South Ossetia	Georgia	Partial	Still claimed by Georgia. Recognized by 5 UN member-states.
1992	Bosnia and Herzegovina	Yugoslavia	Yes	Set off Bosnian War
1999	Abkhazia	Georgia	Partial	Still claimed by Georgia. Recognized by 5 UN member-states.
2008	Kosovo	Serbia	Partial	Still claimed by Serbia; A United Nations General Assembly (UNGA) resolution adopted on 8 October 2008 backed the request of Serbia to seek an International Court of Justice advisory opinion on Kosovo's declaration of independence. On 22 July 2010, the ICJ ruled that the declaration of independence of Kosovo "did not violate any applicable rule of international law", because its authors, who were "representatives of the people of Kosovo", were not bound by the Constitutional Framework (promulgated by UNMIK) or by UNSCR 1244 that is addressed only to United Nations member states and organs of the United Nations. See: International recognition of Kosovo
2014	Crimea	Ukraine	Partial	Annexed by Russia; still claimed by Ukraine. Recognized only by 7 UN member states.
2014	Donetsk; Luhansk	Ukraine	Partial	Annexed by Russia; still claimed by Ukraine. Recognized only by 8 UN member states.
2017	Catalonia	Spain	No	Spanish sovereignty remained unchanged

== Legal aspects ==
The International Court of Justice, in a 2010 advisory opinion, declared that unilateral declarations of independence were not illegal under international law.

== See also ==
- Declaration of independence
- Decolonization
- Helsinki Accords (also known as the Helsinki Final Act)
- International law
- International relations
- List of sovereign states by date of formation
- Secession
- United Nations
