= The Redundancy of Courage =

1991 novel by Timothy Mo

- Author: Timothy Mo
- Language: English
- Publisher: Chatto & Windus
- Publication date: 1991
- Publication place: United Kingdom

The Redundancy of Courage is a novel by British-Asian writer Timothy Mo published in 1991. It is set in the fictitious country of Danu in Southeast Asia, which is based on East Timor. It is narrated by Adolph Ng, an ethnic Chinese businessman educated in Canada. It was shortlisted for the Booker Prize for Fiction.

== Plot introduction ==
Like East Timor, Danu is a former Portuguese colony north of Australia. It is invaded and occupied by its giant neighbour, which is not named, but is based on Indonesia. The people of the occupying country are referred to throughout the book as the malai. This similar to malae, the word for foreigner in Tetum, East Timor's main language. Danu is annexed by the malai and declared their 'fifty-eighth province', over which their green and white flag is raised.

== Allusions to actual history and geography ==
Although the characters are fictional, they are closely based on people involved in events in East Timor during 1975. Osvaldo Oliveira, commander of the FAKINTIL guerilla army, is based on Nicolau Lobato, who became Prime Minister following the unilateral declaration of independence in 1975, and Xanana Gusmão, who later became the first President of East Timor in 2002. FAKOUM, the pro-independence party, is based on Fretilin. FAKINTIL is similarly based on Falintil.

Joaquim Lobato is based on exiled leader José Ramos-Horta (later Foreign Minister, Prime Minister and President). Bill Mabbely is based on Australian journalist Roger East, who was killed by Indonesian troops in Dili on the day of the invasion. The date of the malai invasion of Danu, 7 December, is the same as that of Indonesia's invasion of East Timor.

Balibo, the town where five Australian-based journalists were killed, is depicted in the novel, as is the killing of the journalists.
