= Yunus Yosfiah =

Indonesian general (born 1944)

General (Ret.) (Hon.) Yunus Yosfiah
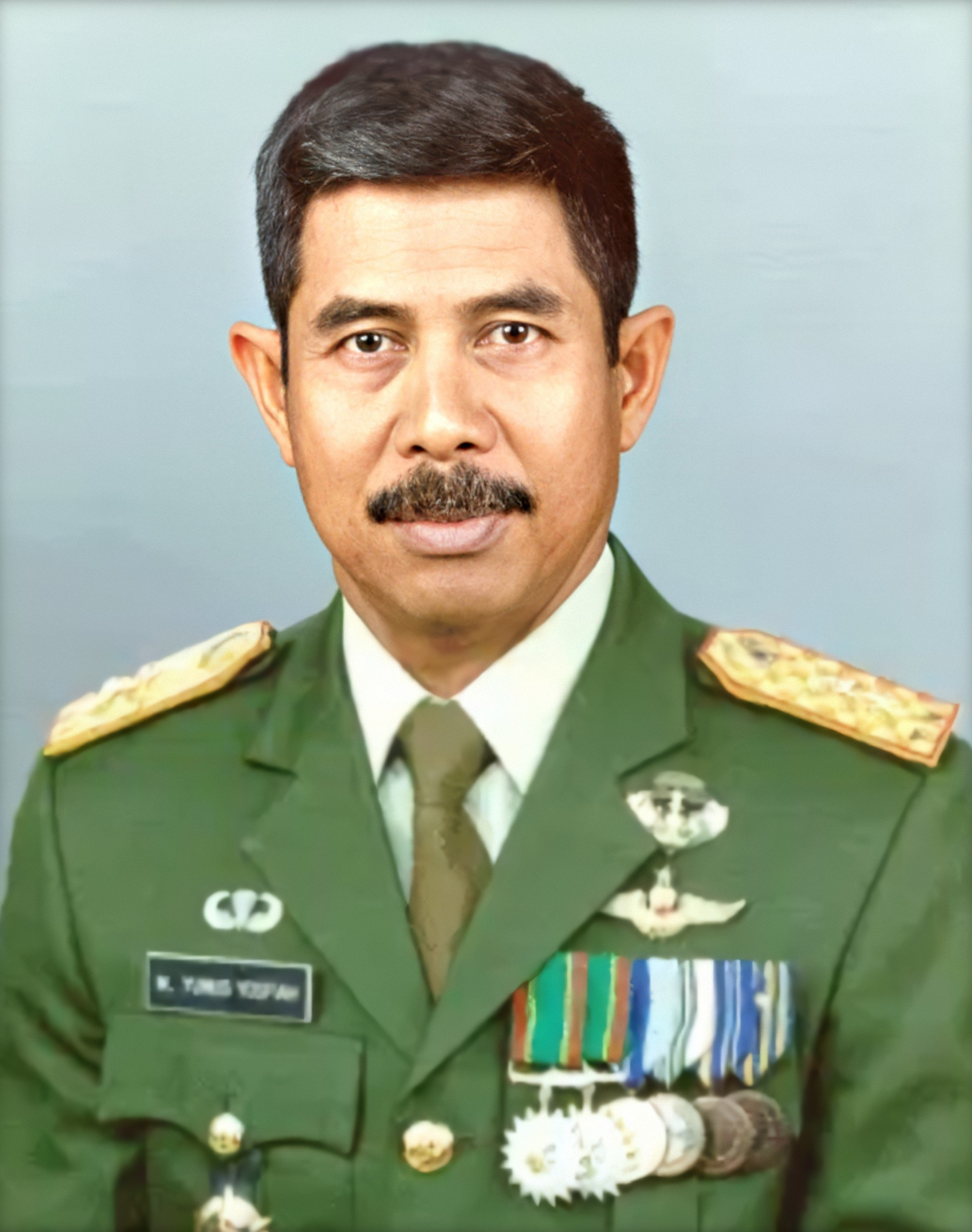

25th Minister of Information
- In office 23 May 1998 – 20 October 1999
- President: B. J. Habibie
- Preceded by: Alwi Dahlan
- Succeeded by: Position abolished

Personal details
- Born: 7 August 1944 (age 82) Rappang, South Sulawesi, Japanese East Indies
- Party: Gerindra
- Spouse: Hj. Antonia Ricardo
- Children: Eric Akbar Ricardo Yunus; Erica; Melissa; Pierre Akbar
- Education: Military Academy (1965)

Military service
- Allegiance: Indonesia
- Branch/service: Indonesian Army
- Years of service: 1965–1999
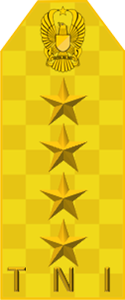
- Rank: General
- Unit: Infantry (Kopassus)
- Battles/wars: Operation Flamboyan; Indonesian invasion of East Timor

General (Ret.) (Hon.) Muhammad Yunus Yosfiah (born 7 August 1944) is an Indonesian politician and a decorated member of the Indonesian Army. Yosfiah served as Minister of Information of Indonesia in the Development Reform Cabinet between 1998 and 1999.

== Action in East Timor ==
=== Balibo Five ===
In 1975, whilst a Captain leading an Indonesian special forces unit into Balibo, East Timor, Yosfiah opened fire on Australian based journalists attempting to surrender, and ordered his men to do the same. After being killed, some of the journalists' bodies were dressed in Portuguese army uniforms and photographed with machine guns as if they had been killed fighting against the Indonesian forces.

In February 2007 Mark Tedeschi QC, the counsel assisting the coroner at the inquest into the death of one of the journalists killed, Brian Peters, said Yosfiah had not responded to invitations to appear at the inquest. New South Wales Deputy State Coroner Dorelle Pinch in her finding found that: 'Brian Raymond Peters, in the company of fellow journalists Gary James Cunningham, Malcolm Harvie Rennie, Gregory John Shackleton and Anthony John Stewart, collectively known as “the Balibo Five”, died at Balibo in Timor Leste on 16 October 1975 from wounds sustained when he was shot and/or stabbed deliberately, and not in the heat of battle, by members of the Indonesian Special Forces, including Christoforus da Silva and Captain Yunus Yosfiah on the orders of Captain Yosfiah, to prevent him from revealing that Indonesian Special Forces had participated in the attack on Balibo.' Several witnesses, including former operatives of the Timorese forces supporting the Indonesian invasion (UDT and Apodeti) identified Yosfiah as a key participant in the murder of the journalists (ibid.). As a consequence Coroner Pinch issued a report on 16 November 2007 that concluded he had participated in a war crime in being involved in the murders, punishable under the Geneva convention which Indonesia was and is a signatory to. with recommendation for prosecution to go to the (Australian) Federal Attorney General.

=== Nicolau dos Reis Lobato ===
He is also alleged to have killed Nicolau dos Reis Lobato, leader of the Fretilin in 1979.

== Minister of Information ==
Yosfiah served as Minister of Information (Menteri Penerangan Indonesia) in the Habibie government in 1998 and 1999. His actions in removing restrictions on media and other forms of communication, including lifting media bans, have been described as, "One of the great breakthroughs of the Habibie administration".

=== Alleged funding of East Timor militias ===
It has been alleged that in 1999 Yosfiah was involved in channeling Indonesian government money to East Timorese militia groups prior to the East Timor independence vote and its bloody aftermath.

== After retiring from TNI ==
Yosfiah retired from the TNI in 1999. In 2002 Yosfiah became a member of the Muslim-based United Development Party (PPP). Yosfiah was General Secretary of PPP in December 2003. In February 2007 Yosfiah unsuccessfully contested the election for party chairmanship of the PPP.

== Timeline ==
Except where previously or otherwise cited the information in the timeline is from "Indonesia" a Southeast Asia Program Publications journal of Cornell University.

- 1944 born
- 1965 AMN 6 (National Military Academy Class 6)
- 1966–197? RPKAD/Kopassandha (Platoon Commander, Group 2; Company Commander, Group 2; Company Commander, Group 4)
- 197?–1978 Commander Infantry Battalion 744, East Timor (Possible conflict with Jakarta Post source below)
- 1975 leads Indonesian forces into Balibo where killings of 5 journalists and Roger East's execution take place.
- 1977–1979 first commander of 744/Satya Yudha Bhakti Infantry Battalion, East Timor.
- 1978 alleged killing of Nicolao Lobato; marries East Timorese woman.
- 1979 Training at Fort Leavenworth, then, Colonel, Deputy Commander of the Special Forces' Group III in Makassar
- ? – 1985 Assistant for Operations to Chief of Staff, Kodam XVI (Special Forces Command), training at Armed Forces Staff and Command School, West Java.
- mid 1985–1987 Commander of Korem 164/Dili
- 1987–1990 Brig. Gen., Director of Educational Upbuilding, Military Academy. Royal College of Defense Studies in Britain ('89 and '90)
- 1990 Chief of Staff, Kodam VI Tanjungpura
- 1993 Major General, Commander of the Army Infantry Weapons Center
- 1997 (July) Chief of ABRI sociopolitical affairs. "Of previous heads ..., not one came from the Special Forces Command."
- 1998–1999 Minister of Information in Habibie government.
- 1999 retires from TNI Lt. Gen.
- 2002 joins PPP.
- 2007 contests election for PPP party chairmanship.

== Classmates in National Military Academy, Class 6 ==
Traditions within the Indonesian military link together the advancement of members of an Academy class. Yosfiah's classmates were:

- Budi Sujana
- Haris Sudarno
- Musa
- M. Yacob Dusto
- R. Karyono
- R.W. Warouw
- R. Widagdo
- Theo Syafei
- Syamsir Siregar
