= Balibo (film) =

2009 Australian film directed by Robert Connolly

- Theatrical film poster
- Directed by: Robert Connolly
- Screenplay by: Robert Connolly; David Williamson
- Based on: Cover-Up by Jill Jolliffe
- Produced by: Anthony LaPaglia; Dominic Purcell
- Starring: Anthony LaPaglia; Oscar Isaac; Damon Gameau; Gyton Grantley; Nathan Phillips; Mark Winter; Thomas Wright; Bea Viegas
- Cinematography: Tristan Milani
- Edited by: Nick Meyers
- Music by: Lisa Gerrard & Marcello De Francisci
- Distributed by: Transmission Films
- Release dates: 24 July 2009 (MIFF); 14 August 2009 (Australia)
- Running time: 111 minutes
- Countries: Australia; East Timor
- Languages: English; Tetum
- Budget: AU$4,500,000

Balibo is a 2009 Australian war film directed by Robert Connolly. Based on true events, the film follows the story of the Balibo Five, a group of journalists who were captured and killed while reporting on activities a few months prior to the Indonesian invasion of East Timor in December 1975. The film, which takes its name from the town of Balibo, is loosely based on the 2001 book Cover-Up by Jill Jolliffe, an Australian journalist who met the men before they were killed.

The film follows dishevelled journalist Roger East, played by Anthony LaPaglia, who travels to East Timor in late 1975 to investigate the deaths of the Balibo Five. Oscar Isaac plays the young José Ramos-Horta, who would later receive the Nobel Peace Prize and become the second President of East Timor, who joins East in the movie. Filming began in June 2008 in Dili, East Timor, and the film was released the following year.

== Plot ==
The film starts in the present day, when an Australian journalist interviews a woman named Juliana, who as a young girl witnessed Roger East's capture and execution by the Indonesian invasion force. We see events from Roger East's point of view, as he investigates the imminent Indonesian invasion of East Timor, and the fate of the Balibo Five, five Australian journalists who went missing prior to the Indonesian invasion.

Then the point of view changes to the Balibo Five's actions in the town, from their departure in Australia, to their arrival in East Timor and being embedded in a Revolutionary Front for an Independent East Timor (abbreviated as FRETILIN in Portuguese) unit near the border.

Then the story switches between Roger East's attempted investigation upon the fate of the Five, and the Five's events in the area, and some of Juliana's story. Roger was with Jose Ramos-Horta along the way, evading Indonesian patrols and witnessing villages with massacred inhabitants.

The Balibo Five painted the Australian flag upon a building to ensure their safety, and declined requests of their FRETILIN bodyguards to join them in retreat. The Five then covers the invasion, until Indonesian soldiers chase and corner them. One of the cameramen tried to tell the soldiers to spare them, but was shot by the officer Yunus Yosfiah. Then, the soldiers breached the building, killing the other journalists.

Then Roger's point of view ends when the Indonesians invade Dili with paratroopers and ground troops. He was captured with East Timorese men and Juliana, as a child, watches as the men are executed by the Indonesians, women were segregated and raped, and Roger was executed by the Indonesian soldiers. The film ends with the inscription that the murderers of the Balibo Five and Roger East were not brought to justice. Then, scenes from Horta's rallies are shown, and finally, free East Timorese enjoying the beach.

== Cast ==
- Anthony LaPaglia as Roger East
- Oscar Isaac as José Ramos-Horta
- Damon Gameau as Greg Shackleton
- Gyton Grantley as Gary Cunningham
- Nathan Phillips as Malcolm Rennie
- Mark Winter as Tony Stewart
- Thomas Wright as Brian Peters
- Michael Stone as Interviewer
- Bea Viegas as Juliana
- Anamaria Barreto as Younger Juliana

== Production ==
Balibo was the first feature film to be made in East Timor. Shooting in Dili began on 31 July 2008, with United Nations police closing off roads, to allow the scenes to be filmed. 16mm-to-35mm visuals were shot at the actual locations where the events took place give a documentary-style texture.

Robert Connolly directed the film, David Williamson wrote the script and Clinton Fernandes served as historical consultant. The film was produced by Connolly's Arenafilms in Australia, with John Maynard and Rebecca Williamson serving as producers. Tristan Milani was responsible for the cinematography, and Nick Meyers edited the film. Australian musician and composer Lisa Gerrard composed the score. LaPaglia, also an executive producer, named East as "probably the best role I've ever had".

Oscar Isaac plays the young José Ramos-Horta, who would later receive the Nobel Peace Prize and become the second President of East Timor.

The film's version of events was validated by an Australian coroner in 2007. After a fresh review of the evidence, the coroner ruled that the journalists were executed as they tried to surrender to Indonesian forces. The filmmakers hoped that Balibo would spur the Australian Government into action. Robert Connolly said that he did not set out to provoke Jakarta but wanted to examine a seminal moment in Indonesia's 24-year occupation of East Timor, when an estimated 183,000 people died: "I think it had to be graphic because otherwise you dangerously dilute what happened."

== Release ==
Balibo received its world premiere at the Melbourne International Film Festival on 24 July 2009 at Melbourne's Hamer Hall.

It screened at the Antipodean Film Festival in Saint Tropez, France, in October 2010.

Close to the date of the 50th anniversary of the killings, on 25 October 2025, the Adelaide Film Festival screened the film at the Mercury Cinema. Connolly was awarded the Don Dunstan Award at the festival for his "outstanding contribution to Australian screen culture". He joined Adelaide filmmaker Sophie Hyde in conversation at the festival.

=== Indonesian ban ===
The film was to have premiered in Indonesia at the 11th Jakarta International Film Festival in December 2009. However, in advance of a private screening, the film was banned by the Indonesian Film Censorship Agency. Indonesian Foreign Minister Marty Natalegawa said the ban was to avoid a negative "global perception of Indonesia". The Indonesian military supported the ban, with a spokesman saying the film could harm Indonesia's relations with Timor Leste and Australia. He also repeated the official version of events, namely that the journalists were killed in a crossfire, and not by Indonesian troops.

== Reception ==
The then President of East Timor, José Ramos-Horta, was in attendance at the world premiere, where there was an address alleging that the Balibo Five were tortured and killed by Indonesian forces. On changes over recent years in Indonesia Ramos-Horta said "It is better. Indonesian democracy today is one of the most inspiring in the south-east Asia region". Also in attendance were the families of the Balibo Five. Relatives of Tony Stewart held aloft a banner bearing his name which had been embroidered by East Timorese women. Maureen Tolfree, sister of Brian Peters, said she hoped many Australians would see the film and that she thought "...it will bring to the Australian public what's gone on," she said. Rotten Tomatoes gives a score of 100% based on 12 reviews, 80% of audiences like the film.

Variety's Richard Kuipers dubbed the film "a tense, character-driven thriller with political comment on the side, allowing viewers with little or no prior knowledge of the subject matter to engage instinctively with the Balibo Five," filmed where it happened and "packing a huge emotional punch". Kuipers continues: "LaPaglia is particularly good as the weary scribe who slowly rediscovers his old fire, and Isaac sparks off him impressively as the younger man whose ability to read people is as sharp as his political acumen."

Screen International's Frank Hatherley opined: "Shot on location with loving attention to period detail, the film's take on these long-buried events is convincing. Connolly's three strands are expertly woven together, coming to twin climaxes where terror and cruelty overwhelm everyone. These 'killing field' scenes are not for the squeamish."

The Monthly's Luke Davies wrote: "Jill Jollife's book ... argues that the Australian government has always known the exact circumstances of the newsmen's deaths. Connolly doesn't try to answer such questions, but rather lets them echo in the film." Davies commended Connolly and co-screenwriter David Williamson for having "crafted an engaging film in which we come to care about the destiny of an entire people as well as for individual characters", and that "the film's denouement is terrifying", making it a realistic and confronting experience.

== Box office ==
Balibo grossed $1,330,863 at the box office in Australia.

== Aftermath ==
The filmmakers hoped that Balibo would spur the Australian Government into action. Almost 18 months on, it had not responded to the coroner's findings – a reticence which may stem from its fear of upsetting diplomatic relations with Jakarta.

Fifty years after the Balibo Five were killed, their families are still fighting for justice, or at least an apology from the Australian Government for the cover-up.

== Accolades ==
Award	Category	Subject	Result
AACTA Awards (2009 AFI Awards)	Best Film	Anthony LaPaglia	Nominated
AACTA Awards (2009 AFI Awards)	Best Film	Dominic Purcell	Nominated
AACTA Awards (2009 AFI Awards)	Best Direction	Robert Connolly	Nominated
AACTA Awards (2009 AFI Awards)	Best Adapted Screenplay	Robert Connolly	Won
AACTA Awards (2009 AFI Awards)	Best Adapted Screenplay	David Williamson	Won
AACTA Awards (2009 AFI Awards)	Best Actor	Anthony LaPaglia	Won
AACTA Awards (2009 AFI Awards)	Best Supporting Actor	Damon Gameau	Nominated
AACTA Awards (2009 AFI Awards)	Best Supporting Actor	Oscar Isaac	Won
AACTA Awards (2009 AFI Awards)	Best Supporting Actress	Bea Viegas	Nominated
AACTA Awards (2009 AFI Awards)	Best Cinematography	Tristan Milani	Nominated
AACTA Awards (2009 AFI Awards)	Best Editing	Nick Meyers	Won
AACTA Awards (2009 AFI Awards)	Best Original Music Score	Lisa Gerrard	Nominated
AACTA Awards (2009 AFI Awards)	Best Sound	Ann Aucote	Nominated
AACTA Awards (2009 AFI Awards)	Best Sound	Emma Bortignon	Nominated
AACTA Awards (2009 AFI Awards)	Best Sound	Phil Heywood	Nominated
AACTA Awards (2009 AFI Awards)	Best Sound	Sam Petty	Nominated
AACTA Awards (2009 AFI Awards)	Best Production Design	Robert Cousins	Nominated
AACTA Awards (2009 AFI Awards)	Best Costume Design	Cappi Ireland	Nominated
ADG Award	Best Direction in a Feature Film	Robert Connolly	Nominated
APRA Award	Best Film Score	Lisa Gerrard	Won
ARIA Music Award	Best Original Soundtrack Album	Lisa Gerrard	Won
ASE Award	Best Editing in a Feature Film	Nick Meyers	Nominated
FCCA Awards	Best Film	Anthony LaPaglia	Nominated
FCCA Awards	Best Film	Dominic Purcell	Nominated
FCCA Awards	Best Director	Robert Connolly	Nominated
FCCA Awards	Best Screenplay	Robert Connolly	Nominated
FCCA Awards	Best Screenplay	David Williamson	Nominated
FCCA Awards	Best Actor – Male	Anthony LaPaglia	Won
FCCA Awards	Best Supporting Actor – Male	Damon Gameau	Nominated
FCCA Awards	Best Supporting Actor – Male	Oscar Isaac	Nominated
FCCA Awards	Best Cinematography	Tristan Milani	Nominated
FCCA Awards	Best Editing	Nick Meyers	Won
FCCA Awards	Best Music Score	Lisa Gerrard	Won
Inside Film Awards	Best Feature Film	Anthony LaPaglia	Nominated
Inside Film Awards	Best Feature Film	Dominic Purcell	Nominated
Inside Film Awards	Best Feature Film	Robert Connolly	Nominated
Inside Film Awards	Best Script	Robert Connolly	Nominated
Inside Film Awards	Best Script	David Williamson	Nominated
Inside Film Awards	Best Actor	Anthony LaPaglia	Nominated
Inside Film Awards	Best Cinematography	Tristan Milani	Nominated
Inside Film Awards	Best Editing	Nick Meyers	Won
Inside Film Awards	Best Music	Lisa Gerrard	Nominated
Inside Film Awards	Best Sound	Ann Aucote	Won
Inside Film Awards	Best Sound	Emma Bortignon	Won
Inside Film Awards	Best Sound	Phil Heywood	Won
Inside Film Awards	Best Sound	Sam Petty	Won
Screen Music Award, Australia	Best Feature Film Score	Lisa Gerrard	Won
São Paulo International Film Festival	Audience Award for Best Foreign Feature Film	Robert Connolly	Won

== See also ==
- Cinema of Australia
