= Roger East =

Roger East may refer to:

- Roger East (journalist) (1922–1975), Australian journalist
- Roger East (referee) (born 1965), English professional football referee
- Roger East, pseudonym of Roger Burford (1904–1981)
