= Operation Flamboyan =

- Part of the Cold War in Asia
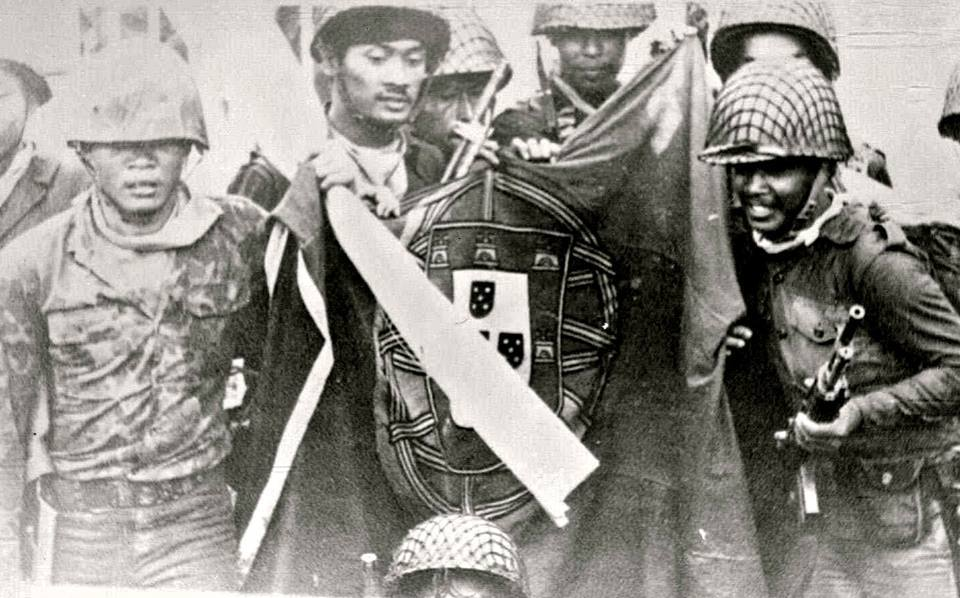
- Indonesian soldiers pose with a seized Portuguese flag in Batugade, East Timor in November 1975
Date	31 August – 28 November 1975
Location	Portuguese Timor
Result	Indonesian victory
Territorial changes	Indonesian forces captured Batugade, Balibo, Maliana, Aidabaleten, and large parts of Bobonaro and Cova Lima Districts

Belligerents
Indonesia	Fretilin

Commanders and leaders
(Indonesia) Dading Kalbuadi (Indonesia) Yunus Yosfiah	Aquiles Freitas Soares

Units involved
Kopassandha	

Operation Flamboyan was a joint military operation in 1975 carried out by various elements of the Armed Forces of the Republic of Indonesia (ABRI) with the aim of annexing the Portuguese Timor. The operation was planned by Benny Moerdani on behalf of the Department of Defense and Security.

== History ==
Through Operation Komodo from 1974 to 1975, BAKIN destabilized Portuguese Timor, which was actually supposed to be preparing for independence, and triggered a civil war between FRETILIN and the União Democrática Timorense (UDT). FRETILIN eventually won a three-week civil war. Supporters of UDT and APODETI were forced to flee to West Timor, Indonesia. They were now working directly with the Indonesian government. Indonesia portrayed the civil war as a threat to regional stability, although FRETILIN quickly restored peace and order after their victory and gained support from the population. On 31 August 1975, command was transferred from BAKIN to the Joint Task Force Command (Kogasgab), and Operation Komodo was replaced by Operation Flamboyan. Operation Flamboyan included large-scale military operations.

== Operation ==
After the formation of the short-lived UDT-FRETILIN coalition on 21 January 1975, Indonesia began large-scale military exercises in southern Sumatra in preparation for an invasion of East Timor. Troop reinforcements were deployed on a small scale along the border with Portuguese Timor.

Between December 1974 and February 1975, an eight-member special forces team (Kopassandha) under the leadership of Dading Kalbuadi was deployed to the Indonesian border town of Atambua to carry out preparation for Operation Flamboyan. The team took over the agent network of Operation Komodo and 216 APODETI supporters, led by Tomás Gonçalves. Those APODETI supporters had been trained by the Indonesian military in Atambua since August 1974. The Portuguese government sent a delegation to Atambua in January 1975 to persuade the partisans to return to Portuguese Timor, but the effort was unsuccessful. Mohammad Yunus Yosfiah recruited and trained new Kopassandha members in West Java. By the end of April 1975, the team in Atambua had been reinforced with 80 personnel.

From late August to early September 1975, Indonesian special forces known as the "Susi Team" began launching attacks into Portuguese Timor. The first assault was led by Captain Yunus Yosfiah and supported by East Timorese partisans who had been trained by the Indonesians. The objective was to create terror and intimidation in Atsabe. On 14 September, a battle occurred with FRETILIN fighters near the border close to Atsabe. On the same day, the Indonesians also launched similar attacks on Bobonaro and Suai. However, heavy losses forced the Indonesians to halt their operations.

On October 8, Indonesian troops disguised as UDT fighters occupied the border town of Batugade in East Timor and brought FALINTIL units to Balibo. They then established an operational headquarters in Balibo. By mid-October, the border districts of Bobonaro and Cova Lima were largely under Indonesian control. On October 15, the "Susi Team" and a battalion from the 2nd Infantry Brigade launched an assault on Balibo. Indonesian warships shelled the coast, but East Timorese militias were hardly involved in the attack. Two British television journalists, one New Zealand journalist, and two Australian television journalists (known as the Balibo Five), who witnessed the capture of the border town on 16 October, were deliberately killed by Indonesian soldiers. Alongside Balibo, Maliana was also captured on 16 October, where Indonesian aircraft had landed. Despite clear evidence of large-scale offensive operations, Indonesia continued to deny having troops in East Timor or any intention of occupying the country by force. They said that UDT and APODETI fighters repelled FRETILIN attacks on Indonesian territory and were also held responsible for the journalists’ deaths.

Further attempts to advance deeper into Portuguese Timor through assaults in October failed due to resistance from FRETILIN. According to a CIA report dated March 20, Indonesia failed to "secure" the border town of Lebos in October. Naval artillery support was absent there. The Indonesian advance also stalled in Lela in mid-October. Indonesian troops faced issues with their weapons and struggled with the onset of the rainy season. After a pause in fighting, the assault resumed on 20 November, with Atabae as a new target. For the first time, naval and air force units were deployed together against East Timorese fighters led by Aquiles Freitas Soares, most of whom were former East Timorese soldiers from the 6th Portuguese Cavalry Company. On 26 November, the East Timorese fighters ceased resistance, and Indonesian troops occupied the main town of Aidabaleten on the morning of 28 November.

On the same day, FRETILIN attempted to gain international support by unilaterally declaring independence. Indonesia responded by reporting that the leaders of UDT, APODETI, KOTA, and the Labour Party had been captured on 30 March. In November 1975, they signed what became known as the Balibo Declaration, which called for the annexation of East Timor by Indonesia. However, they were forced to sign the document. The text was written by Bakin agent Louis Taolin.

Starting on December 7, 1975, Indonesia launched Operation Seroja by citing the Balibo Declaration. This initiated an open invasion of all of East Timor, including the occupation of Dili.

== See also ==
- History of East Timor
- Indonesian invasion of East Timor
