= Dading Kalbuadi =

Indonesian Army officer

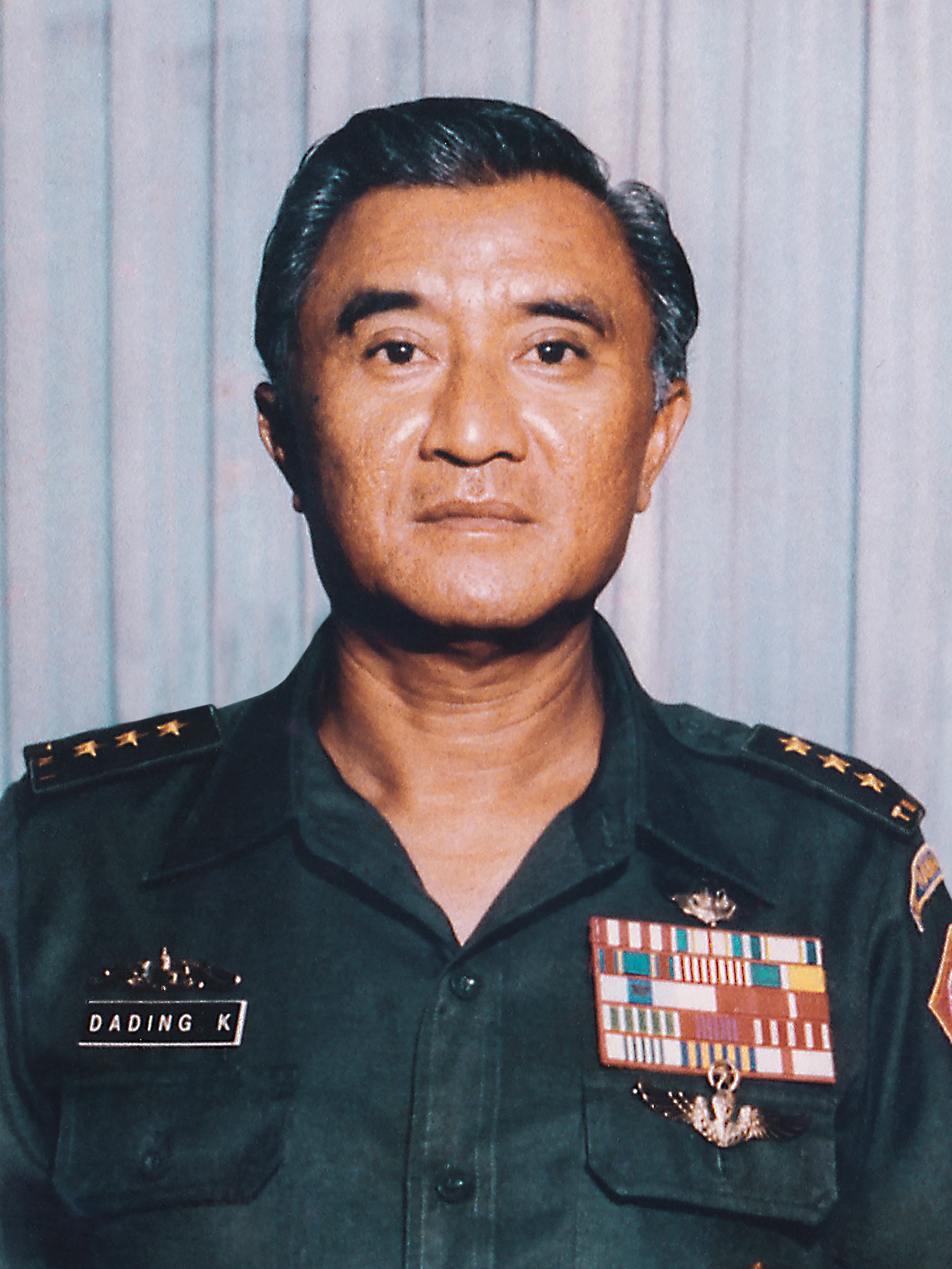
- Dading Kalbuadi as Chief of the General Staff
- Born: 14 April 1931; Adipala, Tjilatjap, Dutch East Indies
- Died: 10 October 1999 (aged 68); Jakarta, Indonesia
- Military career
- Allegiance: Indonesia
- Branch: Indonesian Army
- Service years: 1952–1988
- Rank: Lieutenant General
- Unit: Infantry/ Kopassus (Komando Pasukan Khusus)
- Conflicts: Operation Tegas; Operation Flamboyan; Indonesian invasion of East Timor

Lieutenant General Dading Kalbuadi (14 April 1931 – 10 October 1999) was an Indonesian Army General and the commander during Operation Seroja (Operation Lotus) the Indonesian invasion of East Timor (1975–1976). He last served as an Inspector General of the Department of Defense of Indonesia.

== Early life ==
Dading Kalbuadi was born in Adipala, Cilacap Regency, Central Java, April 14, 1931. During the Indonesian War of Independence, he joined the "Indonesia Merdeka atau Mati" armed militia (IMAM) in Purwokerto, Banyumas from 1946 to 1950.

== Military career ==
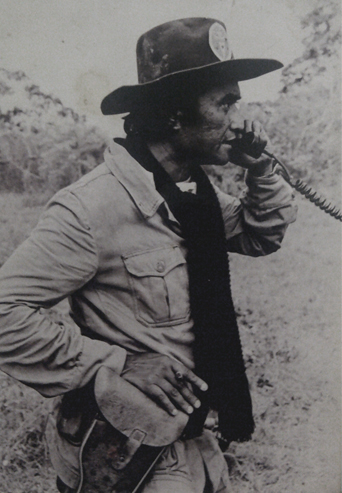
Colonel Dading Kalbuadi, in East Timor

Dading Kalbuadi continued his career to the Officer Candidate School in Bandung, where he befriended Benny Moerdani future General of the Indonesian Armed Forces. After graduating he joined the Resimen Para Komando Angkatan Darat (RPKAD) and continued his studies at Fort Benning, USA.

Dading Kalbuadi was deployed against Darul Islam rebels in West Java, and PRRI Rebels in Riau, as part of Operation Tegas, where he was shot in a rebel attack.

In 1975 he was assigned by Benny Moerdani, to Operation Flamboyan, in Portuguese Timor, where he was tasked with infiltrating the territory and supporting pro-Indonesian forces, in preparation for the main Indonesian invasion in Operation Seroja.

During the Indonesian Occupation of East Timor he obtained the rank of general and was appointed as the commander of the regional defense and security of East Timor, replacing Soeweno.

After leaving East Timor in 1978 he became commander of Kodam IX/Udayana until 1983. When Benny Moerdani was promoted to Commander of the Indonesian Armed Forces, Dading was given a promotion to Chief of the General Staff of the Indonesian Army, when Benny was promoted to Minister of Defense, Dading was promoted to Inspector General of the Department of Defense.

== Personal life ==
Dading Kalbuadi died in Jakarta on October 10, 1999

== Sources ==
- TNI Watch!-- Let. Jendral Dading Kalbuadi - https://web.archive.org/web/20110801015157/http://www.minihub.org/siarlist/msg03876.html (October 12, 1999)
- [INDONESIA-L] KMP - Dading Kalbuadi- http://www.library.ohiou.edu/indopubs/1999/10/10/0048.html (October 10, 1999)
