= Hotel Dili =

Hotel in Dili, Timor-Leste

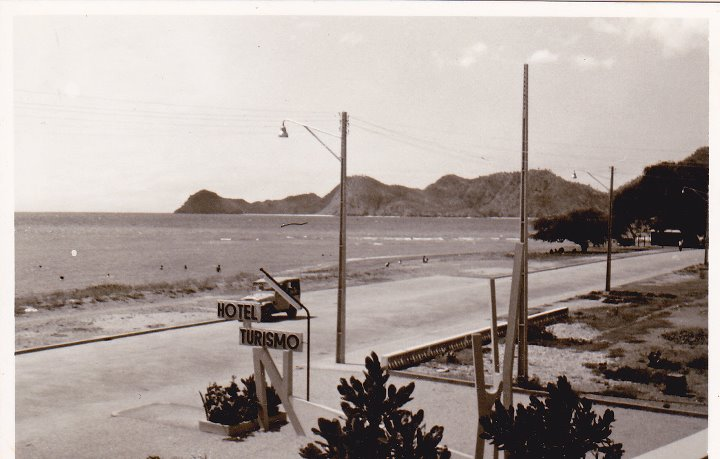
- Hotel Dili

- Location within East Timor

General information
- Location: Avenida dos Direitos Humanos, Dili, Timor-Leste
- Coordinates: 8°33′7″S 125°34′58″E
- Opening: 1933

Hotel Dili is a hotel on the waterfront in Dili, Timor-Leste, established in 1933. It was purchased by Australian Frank Favaro (1935-2000) in 1971. In 1975, Favaro harbored six Australians at the hotel during a battle, part of the Indonesian invasion of East Timor, although they were said to "consistently refuse offers of evacuation." The "concrete structures of the Hotel Dili were deemed almost impervious to assault." The hotel had to be evacuated at one point due to an attack. Jane Nicholls describes the hotel as "wacky" and "East Timor's own Fawlty Towers."
