= Clinton Fernandes =

Australian historian and academic

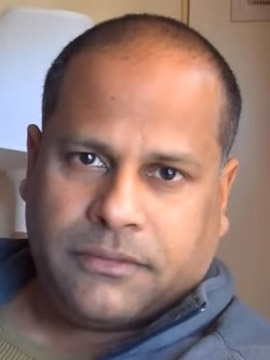
- Fernandes in 2010
- Born: 1971 (age 54–55)

Academic background
- Education: Deakin University (PhD)
- Thesis: 'Transformational analysis of the national interest' (2004)
- Influences: Humphrey McQueen; Noam Chomsky

Academic work
- Institutions: University of New South Wales (2005–present)
- Notable students: C. J. Coventry
- Main interests: International Relations, Security Studies
- Notable works: Island Off the Coast of Asia (2018); Balibo

Clinton Fernandes (born 1971) is an Australian historian and academic who is professor of international and political studies at the University of New South Wales in Canberra, Australia, part of the Australian Defence Force Academy. His work is primarily concerned with Australia’s national security, in particular intelligence matters and Australia's relations with its Southeast Asian neighbours. Fernandes has notably criticised Australia's relationship with Indonesia, in particular concerning the occupation of East Timor. He also provided the first official proof of ASIS involvement in the 1973 Chilean coup.

== Education ==
Fernandes completed his thesis at Deakin University in 2004, entitled A Transformational Analysis of the National Interest, which argued that the Australian Government was forced by public outrage to support the Independence of East Timor.

== Intelligence career ==
Fernandes served in the military during his twenties when he was seconded to the Australian Army Intelligence Corps (AUSTINT) as a case officer on the Indonesian desk. In the lead up to the Independence of East Timor and during the International Force for East Timor (INTERFET), Fernandes and Lance Collins become embroiled in an intelligence leak scandal.

Fernandes and Collins wrote a report contradicting the assessment of the Defence Intelligence Organisation (DIO), which had not acknowledged a change in circumstances. Both officers believed that conditions were ripe for a UN backed peacekeeping mission. However, the Jakarta lobby – a powerful de facto group within the apparatus of Australian government that believed Indonesia must be placated – as well as the Australian Department of Defence became increasingly concerned with their contradictory assessment. The DIO liaison in Washington, Merv Jenkins, who was under pressure from within DIO to conceal intelligence information, provided US agencies with that intelligence believing it was within his authority. The prospect of significant disciplinary proceedings and an end to his career caused Jenkins to commit suicide on his birthday.

The Indonesian government began violently suppressing Timor’s shift towards independence, public pressure became insurmountable. The Howard government gave in and Major General Peter Cosgrove announced the new approach. Collins became a key advisor. During his tenure he became increasingly concerned with the violence of Indonesian forces, worrying the Jakarta lobby. Some communications between Australian intelligence and INTERFET forces were disconnected for some 24 hours, but this did not place these forces at risk. Collins, believing this to be a personal warning, called for a royal commission into the disconnection.

Major intelligence leaks revealing the extent of the Howard government's knowledge in the buildup to the Independence of East Timor emerged in 2000, including their knowledge of Indonesian violence towards Timorese. The homes of Fernandes and Collins were raided by the Australian Federal Police, with Fernandes receiving a 12-month suspension and Collins being publicly outed as the apparent source of the leak. Yet, no charges were formally laid. Fernandes was eventually cleared of wrongdoing and promoted to the rank of major.

An external investigation was launched which found that the Jakarta lobby existed within DIO, thus verifying the concerns of Fernandes and Collins. The author of this report, Captain Martin Toohey, was publicly ridiculed by the Howard government and subject to investigation. The Inspector-General of Intelligence and Security and a Senate Estimates Committee publicly affirmed the veracity of Toohey’s report in 2005. No further action was taken upon being referred to the Australian Minister for Defence.

== Academic career ==
Fernandes' academic career at the UNSW at ADFA has been primarily focused on intelligence matters and Australian’s relations with Southeast Asia, particularly Indonesia and Timor Leste. Since 2007 he has undertaken an exhaustive effort to challenge a decision by the Australian Government to block the release of documents in National Archives of Australia that would demonstrate Australia's knowledge of violence perpetrated against the Timorese in the early 1980s. His efforts were stifled by significant delays and vague arguments on the part of successive governments to deny the release of documents beyond the 30 year rule because it would allegedly damage Australia's relations with Indonesia in the present time.

“Cabinet of the day not only looked away from calamity, but participated enthusiastically in the subjugation of Timor.” Fernandes, 2013.

Fernandes was embroiled in an intellectual dispute with Associate Professor Philip Mendes, from Monash University Faculty of Medicine, in 2005. Mendes responded to an article Fernandes had written about Noam Chomsky in Overland magazine, arguing Fernandes had overlooked what Mendes said was the implicit anti-Semitism of Chomsky's role in the Faurisson affair, when he said that deniers of the Holocaust were not necessarily anti-Semitic for that reason alone. Responding in the same edition, Fernandes said that Chomsky's argument was often misunderstood and highlighted what Fernandes saw as Mendes' bias:

"Chomsky notes that the US public believes Vietnamese casualties in the Vietnam War to be approximately 100,000, although the official figure is two million and the actual figure is probably four million. But this does not necessarily imply that the entire US public are anti-Vietnamese racists. Similarly, most westerners deny, despite massive historic and demographic evidence, the genocide of approximately ten million Native Americans in North America and approximately one hundred million in South America. They are not necessarily anti-Native American racists... Racism is not the sole reason; others include ignorance, misinformation or incredulity."

Fernandes has also written a book about Chomsky, whom he has met, entitled Peace with Justice: Noam Chomsky in Australia. A review of academic Robert Manne's years as editor of Quadrant magazine, 1989-1997, written by Fernandes, attacked the academic's timidity in addressing the complicity of successive Australian governments with the Indonesian regime in East Timor. This review later received comment on the ABC:

"Mr Manne railed against crimes that he had no ability to stop, while largely ignoring a privileged opportunity to struggle against crimes in which his government was complicit. This is morally comparable to a Soviet commissar denouncing racism in the USA while saying little about the USSR's support for tyranny in Eastern Europe. Perhaps the comparison is unfair... to the commissar, who had reason to fear for his physical wellbeing in a way that a Western intellectual did not."

In 2016, the National Library of Australia awarded Fernandes a fellowship for his work, The bi-partisan consensus in Australian foreign policy, 1983.

In 2021, Fernandes obtained documents through Freedom of Information that contained the first official proof that the Australian Secret Intelligence Service (ASIS) participated in a destabilisation campaign against Chile, prior to the 1973 Chilean coup d'état. Prime minister William McMahon approved the establishment of an ASIS station in Santiago in December 1970 and his successor, Gough Whitlam, ordered the closure of the station in 1973. The station conducted covert operations, handled Central Intelligence Agency (CIA) assets and filed reports to CIA headquarters in Langley, Virginia.

Fernandes' 2018 work, Island Off the Coast of Asia, touched on the links between British slavery and Australian colonisation. This particular aspect was the subject of a Guardian Australia article by journalist Paul Daley. Fernandes had documented how "some of the scions of colonial society established themselves in Australia with wealth earned through slavery and official compensation for the loss of income from it when the British government eventually abolished the trade in dark-skinned humans". Some of the examples provided by Fernandes included merchant banker, landowner, colonial parliamentarian and philanthropist George Fife Angas, lord mayor of Melbourne Godfrey Downes Carter, dental surgeon John Belisario, businessman Charles Edward Bright, founder of the University of Sydney and its former vice chancellor, Reverend Robert Allwood and Chief Justice of the Supreme Court of Western Australia Archibald Paull Burt. David R.M. Irving & Marcio Andrade-Campos wrote in a 2025 article that both Fernandes and Daley implied that George Fife Angas was a slave owner, when there is no evidence of this. Irving and Andrade-Campos wrote that Fernandes, Daley and Humphrey McQueen) misinterpreted the nature of Angas's agency in collecting slave compensation money for others.

== Activism ==
In 2009, Fernandes acted as the historical consultant for the film Balibo based on the 1975 events surrounding the murders of the Balibo Five and Roger East. Although the film credits Jill Jolliffe’s book ‘’Cover-Up’’ as the basis for the script, Fernandes undertook significant rewrites in order to maintain historical accuracy and refocus on events that occurred in East Timor instead of Australia.

Fernandes has undertaken extensive work with various Australian politicians. For example, he has often pursued issues with Senator Nick Xenophon, who is leader of NXT in the Australian Senate. Writing in the Sydney Morning Herald on the 40th anniversary of the Balibo Five murders, Fernandes and Xenophon outlined Australia's history of complicity with Indonesia:

"Successive governments acted to shield the Indonesian military from criticism in Australia. Under prime minister Malcolm Fraser, Australia became the only Western country to give legal recognition to the Indonesian annexation. After a particularly shocking massacre in late 1991, then foreign minister Gareth Evans ordered the removal of more than 100 wooden crosses – placed as a sign of mourning – from the lawn in front of the Indonesian Embassy in Canberra. The Keating government ensured that Indonesian foreign minister Ali Alatas received the award of the Order of Australia in 1995. Not to be outdone, Tim Fischer, deputy prime minister in the Howard government, said that Indonesian president Suharto was "perhaps the world's greatest figure in the latter half of the 20th century."

Fernandes also co-authored a submission to the Independent National Security Legislation Monitor regarding the suppression of investigative journalism under legislative changes to the Australian Security Intelligence Organisation Act.

== See also ==
- David McBride

== Published works ==
- Subimperial Power: Australia in the International Arena. Melbourne University Publishing. 2022. ISBN 978-0-522-87926-1.
- Island off the Coast of Asia: Instruments of Statecraft in Australian Foreign Policy. Rowman & Littlefield. 2018. ISBN 978-1-4985-6545-5.
- Peace with Justice: Noam Chomsky in Australia. Monash University Publishing. 2012. ISBN 978-1-921867-36-1.
- The Independence of East Timor: Multi-dimensional Perspectives--occupation, Resistance, and International Political Activism. Apollo Books. 2011. ISBN 978-1-84519-428-4.
- Hot Spot: Asia and Oceania: Asia and Oceania. ABC-CLIO. 2008. ISBN 978-0-313-35413-7.
- Reluctant Indonesians: Australia, Indonesia, and the Future of West Papua. Scribe Publications. 2006. ISBN 978-1-921215-06-3.
- Reluctant Saviour: Australia, Indonesia, and the Independence of East Timor. Scribe Publications. 2004. ISBN 978-1-920769-28-4.
- Fernandes, Clinton (11 May 2019). What Uncle Sam Wants: U.S. Foreign Policy Objectives in Australia and Beyond. Springer. ISBN 978-981-13-7799-0.
