= The Monkey King (Mo novel) =

1978 novel by Timothy Mo

- First edition
- Author: Timothy Mo
- Cover artist: Corinne Pearlman
- Language: English
- Genre: Historical fiction
- Publisher: André Deutsch
- Publication date: 1978
- Publication place: United Kingdom
- Media type: Print (hardback & paperback)
- ISBN: 978-0-571-12966-9 (Faber & Faber); ISBN 978-0-952-41937-2 (Paddleless Press)

The Monkey King is the 1978 debut novel of Timothy Mo, originally published in London by André Deutsch. It was subsequently released through other UK and US publishers – including Faber & Faber (paperback 1978), HarperCollins (hardcover 1978), Random House/Doubleday hardcover (1980), Vintage (softcover, 1993) – before being self-published by the author under the Paddleless Press imprint in 2000. Comic and ironic in style, the novel was chosen by Hilary Bailey of the New Fiction Society and won the Geoffrey Faber Memorial Prize in 1979.

A 10-part abridgement of the novel (by Margaret Busby) was broadcast on BBC Radio 4's Book at Bedtime in 1997, from 23 June to 4 July, read by David Yip.

== Synopsis ==
The Monkey King follows the humorous exploits of protagonist Wallace Nolasco, who finds himself in financial straits after being denied his dowry in hectic post-war Hong Kong, and must by guile better both himself and the moribund reputation of the Chinese house he has married into. The plot of The Monkey King, which is a family saga, divided into three sections, is driven by the tensions between Wallace and his father-in-law, the patriarchal Mr Poon.

== Background ==
In 1993, Mo wrote in The Independent:

"The only easy thing about my first novel was traditionally the hardest part, getting it published. Less than a fortnight after delivering the manuscript in May 1977 I received a charming letter of acceptance from Diana Athill of Andre Deutsch, the editor of Jean Rhys and V S Naipaul, no less. I was 26....

Looking back on The Monkey King is as painful and farcical as looking back on first love. ...The South China Morning Post said The Monkey King was 'so bad it should never have been published'; with the headline 'File under nuts'. ...The Jamaican Sunday Gleaner noted that the book beggared description, was full of unintentionally funny passages, and altogether inferior to 'The House of Mr Biswas' (sic) by Naipaul....

It had been monstrously difficult to write.... But ... I've never brought off anything as funny or as sharply characterised as those early scenes from The Monkey King again, nor will I....And Miss Athill still thinks it's my best book.

Mo's novel evoked comparisons with the 16th-century classical Chinese work Journey to the West, and the Los Angeles Times reviewer observed that, "like its illustrious forebear, this 20th-Century tale is at turns comic and serious, sympathetic and cruel, and certainly never dull."

== Awards ==
The Monkey King was awarded the Geoffrey Faber Memorial Prize in 1979.
