= Sour Sweet =

1982 novel by Timothy Mo

- First edition
- Author: Timothy Mo
- Language: English
- Genre: Fiction, Black comedy
- Publisher: André Deutsch
- Publication date: 1982
- Publication place: United Kingdom
- ISBN: 0-233-97365-6

Sour Sweet is a 1982 novel by Timothy Mo. Written as a 'sour sweet' comedy the story follows the tribulations of a Hong Kong Chinese immigrant and his initially reluctant wife as they attempt to make a home for themselves in 1960s London. It was awarded the Hawthornden Prize for 1982, and shortlisted for the Booker Prize for Fiction.

== Film adaptation ==
The novel was filmed as Soursweet in 1988. Mike Newell directed. Novelist Ian McEwan wrote the script.
