= Soursweet =

- Directed by: Mike Newell
- Screenplay by: Ian McEwan
- Based on: Sour Sweet by Timothy Mo
- Produced by: Roger Randall-Cutler
- Starring: Sylvia Chang; Danny Dun
- Cinematography: Michael Garfath
- Edited by: Mick Audsley
- Music by: Richard Hartley
- Distributed by: Curzon
- Release date: 1988 (UK)
- Running time: 110 minutes
- Language: English

Soursweet is a 1988 British film directed by Mike Newell. The screenplay was written by Ian McEwan from the 1982 novel Sour Sweet by Timothy Mo.

== Plot ==
The story, set in the 1960s, is a comedy drama about a young Hong Kong Chinese couple who emigrate to England and start a family. Initially Chen works long hours in a Chinese restaurant while his wife Lily looks after their baby, dreaming of the day when they can open their own business. When Chen becomes indebted to Triads through gambling he decides it is time for his family to go it alone.

== Cast ==
- Sylvia Chang as Lily
- Danny Dun as Chen
- Jodi Long as Mui
- Soon Tek-Oh as 'Red' Cudgel
- Jim Carter as Mr. Constantinides
- William Chow as White Paper Fan
- Shih Chieh King as Night Brother

== Honours ==
- Golden Hugo (Best Feature Film) - Chicago International Film Festival (nominated)
