= Halilulik =

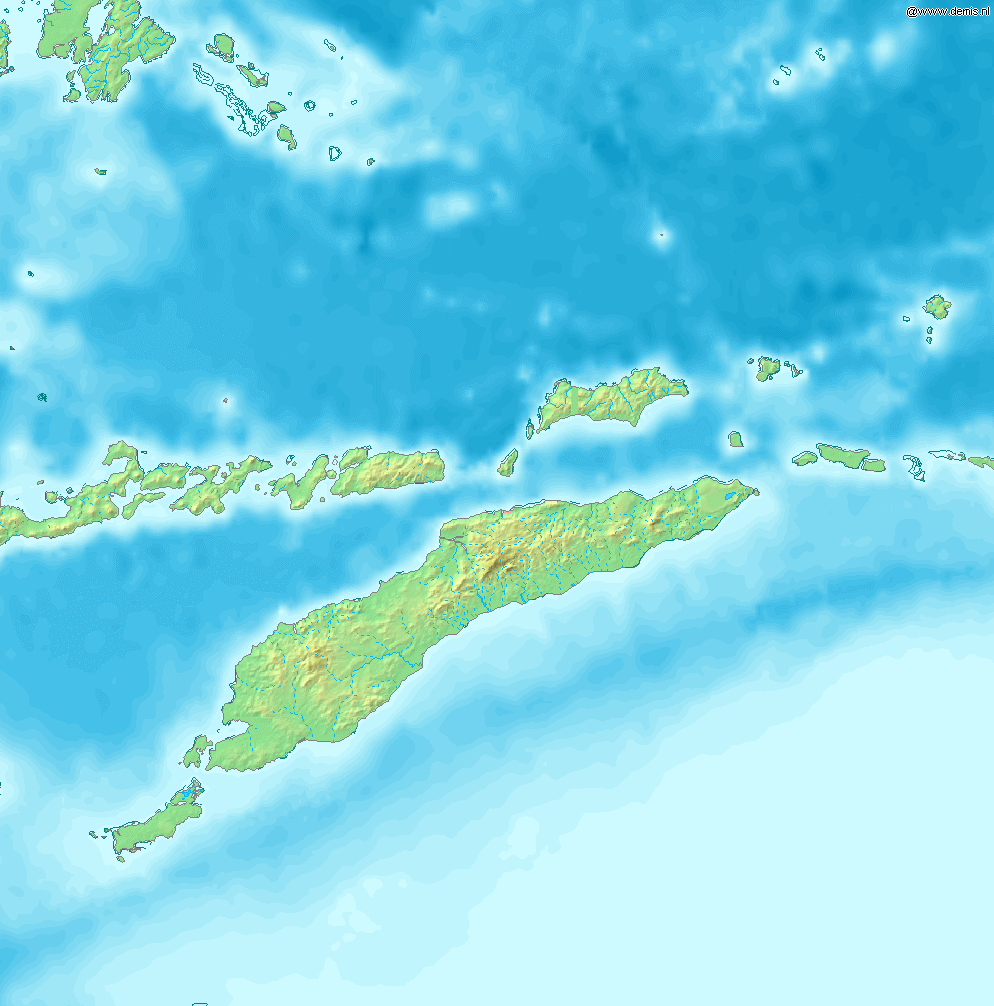
- Location in Timor
- Coordinates: 9°16′38″S 124°52′47″E
- Country: Indonesia
- Region: Lesser Sunda Islands
- Province: East Nusa Tenggara
- Territory: West Timor
- Regency: Belu

Halilulik is a small town in West Tasifeto administrative District (kecamatan), in Belu Regency in the West Timor part of Nusa Tenggara Timur Province, Indonesia. A road connects it to Kota Atambua in the north. A RSKM hospital complex is located in Halilulik.
