= Balibo Five =

Group of foreign journalists killed by Indonesian forces in Portuguese Timor (1975)

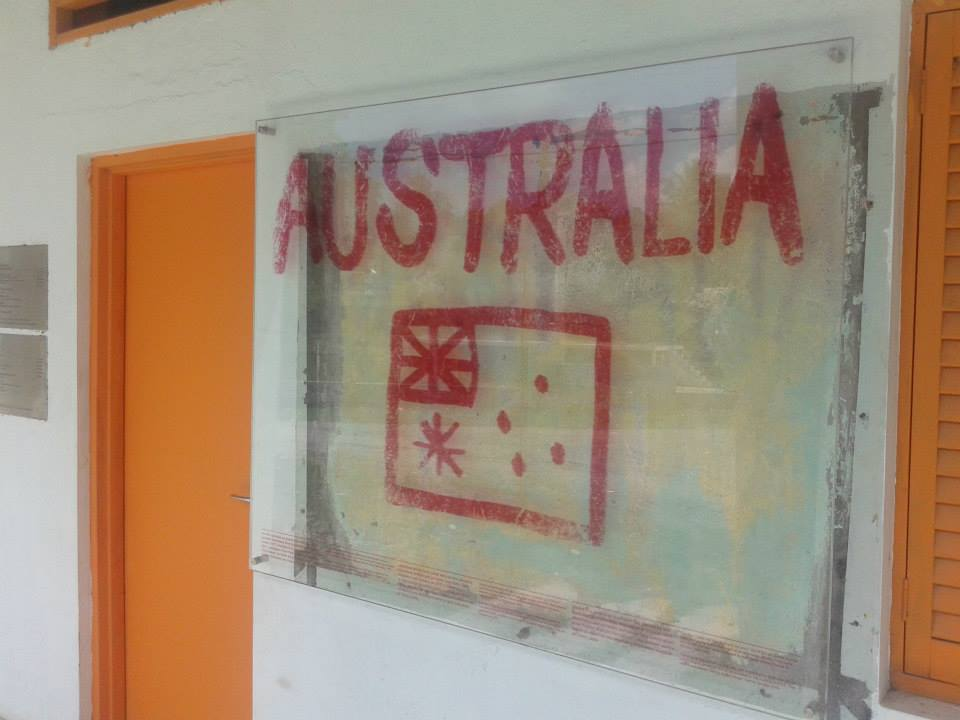
The Australian flag in Balibo

The Balibo Five was a group of Commonwealth journalists - two Australian, two British, and one New Zealander - working for Australian commercial television networks who were murdered by the Indonesian military in the period leading up to the Indonesian invasion of East Timor on 7 December 1975. The Balibo Five were based in the town of Balibo in East Timor (then Portuguese Timor), where they were killed on 16 October 1975 during Indonesian incursions before the invasion. Journalist Roger East travelled to Balibo soon afterwards to investigate the likely deaths of the Five, and was executed by members of the Indonesian military on the docks of Dili on 8 December 1975. In 2007, following an inquest into the deaths, an Australian coroner ruled that they had been deliberately killed by Indonesian special forces soldiers. The official Indonesian version is that the men were killed by cross-fire during the battle for the town. In 2009, the Australian Federal Police (AFP) launched a war crimes investigation, but eventually concluded, in 2014, that there was insufficient evidence to prove an offence. The families of the murdered men continue to advocate for justice. Balibo House Trust was set up in their honour, and continues to do charitable work in East Timor.

== The incident ==
=== The journalists ===
The group of journalists subsequently known as "the Balibo Five" comprised two Australians, reporter Greg Shackleton, 29, and sound recordist Tony Stewart, 21; a New Zealander, Gary Cunningham, 27, cameraman for HSV-7 (now part of the Seven Network) in Melbourne; and two British citizens, cameraman Brian Peters, 24, and reporter Malcolm Rennie, 29, both working for TCN-9 (now part of the Nine Network) in Sydney.

=== The event ===
While the men were aware that Indonesian troops were to mount an attack on the town of Balibo as part of Operation Flamboyan, before the 1975 invasion of East Timor, they believed that, as journalists, they would not be considered military targets. Greg Shackleton was filmed painting an Australian flag and the word "AUSTRALIA" on the wall of a house in the town square. They were shot and killed on 16 October 1975.

Senior diplomats told the 2007 coroner's inquest of their understanding that "the killing was done by the Indonesian military and that it was deliberate".

According to historian Clinton Fernandes:

"The five journalists... clearly identified themselves as Australians and as journalists. They were unarmed and dressed in civilian clothes. They had their hands raised in the universally recognised gesture of surrender. They were killed deliberately on orders that emanated from the highest levels. Their corpses were dressed in uniforms, guns placed beside them, and photographs taken in an attempt to portray them as legitimate targets".

The official Indonesian version is that the men were killed by crossfire during the battle for the town.

=== Roger East ===
Roger East, 53, an Australian AAP-Reuters journalist, travelled to East Timor to investigate the deaths of the five men. East was captured in Dili by the Indonesian military on 7 December 1975, the day of the invasion, and executed by firing squad on the morning of 8 December with his body being disposed of in the ocean. He has been referred to as the forgotten sixth member of the Balibo Five. Calls for an inquest into East's death have been rejected.

A 1999 government inquiry into the deaths of the Balibo Five and Roger East, conducted by the former chairman of the National Crime Authority and Australian Government Solicitor Tom Sherman, found no evidence of murder but accused Indonesia of burning their bodies in a "charade" to destroy all evidence of a "monumental blunder" following their deaths in crossfire. However, in contrast to the Balibo incident, the killing of Roger East:

"took place in an urban area with a number of uninvolved persons in close proximity. The quality of the evidence on Roger East's death was much higher. The evidence came from two eyewitnesses, supported by strong circumstantial evidence of the killing from two further witnesses. In relation to Roger East, I have concluded that it is more likely than not he was summarily executed by an unidentified Indonesian soldier late on the morning of December 8, 1975, in the wharf area of Dili".

== Advocacy ==
=== Family members ===
Shirley Shackleton (1931–2023), widow of Greg, led the campaign for an enquiry into the killings. She was also an outspoken supporter of East Timor's fight for independence.

There is a constant pattern of deception from the Australian government. Kevin Rudd has vowed that the Indonesian military should be held to account, but privately the Australian government doesn't do anything. This hasn't just gone on since the coroner's report, it has gone on since the murders. Shirley Shackleton, 17 December 2010.

In 1994, Brian Peters' sister, Maureen Tolfree, became involved with the East Timor issue, having heard of a demonstration in her home town of Bristol against the sale of BAE Hawk fighter jets to Indonesia.

Musician Paul Stewart was a teenager when his 21-year-old brother Tony died. He later formed the Dili Allstars with Colin Buckler (of the band Painters and Dockers). They recorded a song with East Timorese musician Gil Santos to protest the capture of East Timorese resistance leader Xanana Gusmão by Indonesian armed forces in 1992. Stewart worked as a consultant on the 2009 film Balibo, saying that it was a difficult but rewarding experience, and that it was one that finally presented the truth to the world. Now running a charity that donates musical instruments to East Timor, Stewart said the film highlighted the Australian government's lack of action over the deaths of the journalists: "To this day, the one phone call my mother's had from the Government came a couple of weeks after it all happened when someone from the embassy in Jakarta called and asked, 'Where should we send the bill for the coffin?'" he said. Malcolm Rennie's mother, Minna, later became involved with the issue until her death, as did his cousin Margaret Wilson.

Evan Shackleton, son of Greg Shackleton, revisited the site 50 years later, along with his family, in October 2025. He and the families of the other murdered men, including Greig Cunningham, brother of Gary Cunningham, are still advocating for the truth to be revealed. Cunningham said that the biggest injustice was the cover-up by the Australian Government, for which the families simply wanted an apology.

=== Political advocacy ===
In 2006, the International Press Institute sent a letter to United Nations Secretary-General, Kofi Annan, to express concern that UN investigators had failed to fully investigate the deaths of the Balibo Five, as well as three other journalists killed in Timor-Leste in 1975 and 1999, and to request that the UN reopen their investigations. Robert Connolly, director of the 2009 film, said, "It's quite clear the journalists were murdered. The current Indonesian and Australian (government) point of view, that they were killed in crossfire, is quite frankly absurd. We seek out war criminals from World War II, so to dismiss calls for justice for the Balibo Five is crazy".

In the Parliament of Australia, the two leading advocates have been Senators Nick Xenophon and Scott Ludlam, who have frequently spoken in the Australian Senate and lodged motions, as well as numerous campaigns in the news media. Writing in The Sydney Morning Herald, Xenophon stated:

"Declassified Australian intelligence records show that the Indonesian high command was very alarmed about the international diplomatic consequences of killing the Balibo Five, and called a halt to its military operations for five weeks. But there was no protest from Australia. The Indonesian military took this as a 'green light'; they realised they could treat the East Timorese as they wished".

== Investigations ==
=== 2007 inquest into death of Brian Peters ===
On 5 February 2007, the Coroner's Court of New South Wales began an inquest into Peters' death. Although he was a British citizen, lawyers for the journalists' families successfully argued that, as Peters was a resident of New South Wales at the time of his death, NSW jurisdiction applied. This was the first public inquiry held regarding the fate of the Balibo Five that had powers to call witnesses.

On the first day of the inquest, Yunus Yosfiah, former Minister for Information in the Habibie Government in Indonesia in 1998 and 1999, was accused of having led the 1975 attack in Balibo. Allegations were also raised that the journalists' bodies were dressed post-mortem in military uniforms and posed with weapons to make them appear to have taken an active part in the fighting. The Australian media reported that the Australian Defence Signals Directorate intercepted an Indonesian military radio communication suggesting that the five were killed on the orders of superiors. An eyewitness account described seeing the five men before they were killed. "At this point Indonesian Army Captain Yunus Yosfiah and his team shot the journalists who were unarmed with their hands in the air ... I saw them shoot. A lot of them were firing. They fired towards the white people".

According to evidence presented, the fifth Balibo victim locked himself in a bathroom but was stabbed in the back with a special forces knife when he emerged. Mark Tedeschi QC, in his closing statement to the inquest, stated, "There is incontrovertible evidence, including eyewitness accounts, that Indonesian troops deliberately killed the Balibo five newsmen. At least three of the journalists were shot after an order was given by Captain Yunus Yosfiah and the fifth man was stabbed by officer Christoforus Da Silva. It is highly unlikely the Captain would have made the decision to kill the newsmen without the sanction of his superior officers. There is enough evidence to refer the case to the Commonwealth Director of Public Prosecutions to consider prosecuting two unnamed people for the war crime of wilful killing". The NSW coroner investigating held that "The Balibo Five... were shot and/or stabbed deliberately, and not in the heat of battle" by the Kopassus (Indonesian special forces), in order to silence them from exposing Indonesia's 1975 East Timor invasion.

After the ruling, newly elected Prime Minister of Australia Kevin Rudd declared "those responsible should be held to account... You can't just sweep this to one side". However, no meaningful action was taken after he was elected.

=== 2009 war crimes investigation ===
On 9 September 2009, it was announced that the Australian Federal Police (AFP) were launching a war crimes probe into the deaths of the Balibo Five.

In 2009, former Indonesian soldier Gatot Purwanto told the ABC the men were shot deliberately but not executed. He says he was about 30 m (98 ft) away when Indonesian soldiers fired on the house in which the men were sheltering. "We knew they were foreigners, but we didn't think about whether they were journalists or not, because in a battle, the instinct is if they're not friends, then they could kill us", he said. He said he was with Special Forces captain Yunus Yosfiah when the Balibo Five were spotted. A coronial inquest into the deaths of the men found Yosfiah, who was later an Indonesian Government minister, ordered the killings. and was therefore guilty of war crimes.

Ben Saul, who acted for the Media, Entertainment and Arts Alliance (MEAA) at the NSW inquiry, said there are "complexities" in the legal situation relating to prosecuting a war crime. "It has to show that there was an international armed conflict between Indonesia and Portugal... and that in the context of that the journalist were killed... I think the legal case for that conflict's existence is very strong on the facts". He said that while the criminal standard of proof was much higher for the police than in a coronial inquest, the AFP have not "satisfactorily" explained whether they had exhausted all lines of inquiry.

The AFP then concluded, in 2014, that there was insufficient evidence to prove an offence.

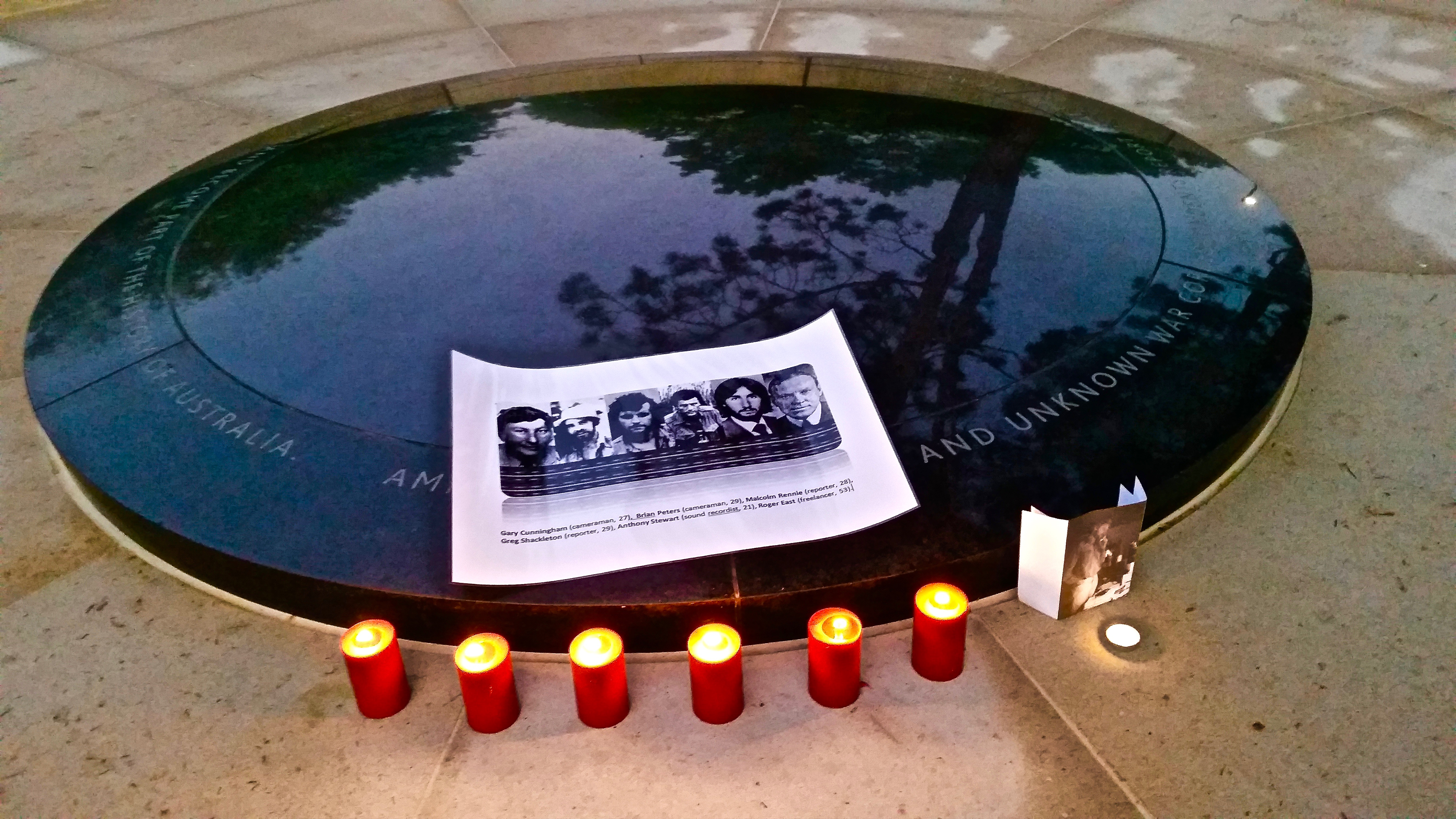
Candles burn to mark the 40th anniversary of their deaths, 2015.

== Anniversaries ==
=== 40th anniversary ===
On 15 October 2015, Xenophon and Fernandes wrote in The Sydney Morning Herald: "We remember the Balibo Five today not because journalists are any more special than other civilians, but because journalists play a crucial role in bringing information about human rights violations to the outside world". On 16 October 2015, the day of the 40th anniversary, mourners gathered at a dawn service in front of the War Correspondents Memorial at the Australian War Memorial to remember the Balibo Five and Roger East. Mourners included family members, representatives of major Australian news networks, the journalists' union, former Australian diplomats, and Senator Xenophon. When the War Correspondents Memorial was opened in September 2015, Prime Minister Malcolm Turnbull said: "Our democracy depends on a free and courageous press. It is the war correspondents that have to tell the truth often in the face of considerable criticism".

According to The Economist, the Australian Government had never challenged the Indonesian Government's official line in order to avoid damaging relations with Indonesia.

=== 50th anniversary ===
On the 50th anniversary of the killings, commemorations were held in Balibo and across Timor-Leste on the anniversary. As of this date, the Indonesian Government had never admitted to nor apologised for the murders, maintaining that the five were killed in "crossfire". Yosfiah was still alive, aged 81, and living in Jakarta. He is a senior member of Indonesian president Prabowo Subianto's political party. Former Indonesian soldier Christoforus da Silva had died in 2022. The Australian Government has never released the "Balibo Files".

== Legacy ==
The Balibo House Trust was established in 2003 with seed funding from the Victorian Government and television stations 7 and 9. It owns the house in the town square on which the journalists had flown the Australian flag, and preserves it as a community learning centre. The foundation's headquarters are in Melbourne, but it supports local schools and organisations in the Balibo area.

Today, there is an annual celebration of press freedom in Timor-Leste on 16 October.

== In the arts and popular culture ==
=== Film ===
A feature film about the killing of the men, called Balibo, was produced in 2009 by Arenafilms, Australia, written by David Williamson and directed by Robert Connolly. The film is based on Cover-Up, by Jill Jolliffe, an Australian journalist who met the men before they were killed. The book has been a source of controversy because of its criticism of some of the people involved in the campaign for justice. The film is largely based on the historical scholarship of Fernandes, who later wrote The Independence of East Timor: Multidimensional Perspectives.

The Balibo killings episode was also fictionalised for the opening sequence of the 1982 film Brothers, written by Roger Ward and directed by Terry Bourke.

=== Theatre ===
In 2011, the Melbourne Theatre Company and Western Australia's Black Swan State Theatre Company commissioned Australian playwright Aidan Fennessy to write a new work on the theme of the Balibo Five. Entitled National Interest, the play focuses on the family of slain journalist Tony Stewart, who was Fennessy's cousin. It was performed in Perth and Melbourne during 2012.

Coinciding with the play's premiere season, on 20 May 2012, East Timor's President José Ramos-Horta presented Paul Stewart with a medal of merit awarded posthumously to his brother Tony.

The script of the play won the People's Choice award at the Victorian Premier's Literary Awards in 2012.

=== Books ===
- Balibo by Jill Jolliffe (ISBN 9781921372773, Scribe, 2009)
- Revelation Beach by Susan Francis (ISBN 9781925893892, Wild Dingo Press, 2025)
- Death in Balibo, Lies in Canberra by Desmond Ball and Hamish McDonald (ISBN 978-1-86508-369-8, Allen & Unwin, 2000)

=== Music ===
- On the last track of the Ginger Baker Trio's 1994 Going Back Home entitled "East Timor", Ginger Baker describes "a TV crew of five / trusted a flag to survive / did not get out alive / from East Timor" among other atrocities committed during the war.
