= Roger East (journalist) =

Australian journalist

- Roger East in an undated photograph
- Born: 7 February 1922; Sydney, New South Wales, Australia
- Died: 8 December 1975 (aged 53); Dili, East Timor
- Cause of death: Execution by shooting
- Occupation: Journalist
- Years active: 1940s–1975
- Known for: Being murdered during the Indonesian invasion of East Timor
- Notable work: ABC Television, Visnews, Australian Associated Press, Radio 2

Roger East (7 February 1922 – 8 December 1975) was an Australian journalist who was murdered by the Indonesian military during its invasion of East Timor in 1975. East was a freelance journalist who worked for the Australian Associated Press (AAP). He travelled to Portuguese Timor (now known as East Timor) in October 1975, following the story of the Balibo Five, who had been killed by Indonesian soldiers just weeks before. East was captured by the Indonesian armed forces and was brought, along with many other prisoners, to the Dili waterfront where he and scores of others were then executed by firing squad. His career had included several stints with Australian Broadcasting Corporation in news reporting, radio, and television, as well as other jobs around the world.

== Early life and education ==
Roger East was born in Girraween, in western Sydney on 7 February 1922, but raised at Eumungerie, near Dubbo, in country New South Wales. He had two older brothers, Bill and Alan, and a younger sister, Glenise. East was a child of the Depression and his teenage years in the 1930s were difficult ones.

During World War II, East served in the Royal Australian Navy spending most of his war service as a signalman on HMAS Burnie, a corvette, during the fall of Singapore and subsequent escort duties.

== Career ==
After the war, East entered journalism. Working at first in regional New South Wales newspapers, in the 1950s he left Australia to cover foreign events in places as varied as Cyprus, China, and the Suez Crisis. He joined ABC Radio Melbourne in 1958 before moving to Brisbane.

East left the ABC in 1961 to work on the Rand Daily Mail in South Africa, which was critical of the apartheid regime. In 1963, he went to work for Visnews (today Reuters Television), an ABC-affiliated TV news agency. Returning to Australia in 1965, he joined the ABC in Sydney, working in radio and television. He then became editor of an English-language newspaper in Spain. East was quoted as stating that he experienced more freedom of the press in Spain under Franco than in Australia under Menzies. After this he worked for the United Nations in New York City.

In the early 1970s he worked as a press officer for different organisations, including both the Australian Country Party and the Australian Labor Party.

East then moved to East Timor and worked as a freelancer there, stringing for both ABC Radio Darwin and the AAP in Sydney.

=== Investigating the Balibo Five ===
At the time of East's arrival, East Timor was under the de facto government of Fretilin, a left-wing political party. The Portuguese governor had fled to the island of Atauro and was refusing to return to the capital, Dili. Fretilin issued a unilateral declaration of independence from Portugal on 28 November 1975.

East was one of only three journalists in Timor — the other two were Michael Richardson, the South-East Asia correspondent for The Age, and Jill Jolliffe, a freelancer who was then working for Reuters. When it became obvious that a full-scale invasion by Indonesia was imminent, Richardson and Jolliffe left with the Red Cross and went to Darwin. East, however, decided to remain in East Timor. He planned to retreat with the Fretilin forces to the mountains in the interior and report from there to the outside world through high frequency radio transmissions. East's last report for the ABC's Correspondents Report was heard on the afternoon of 7 December 1975.

East was captured by the Indonesian military before he could get away. Eyewitnesses later reported that East was brought, along with many other prisoners, to the Dili waterfront, where he and scores of others were then executed by firing squad on 8 December 1975.

Following an inquest into the murder of the Balibo Five, there were calls for a similar inquest into the murder of East.

== In popular culture ==
In Timothy Mo's novel The Redundancy of Courage, the character Bill Mabbely is based upon Roger East.

Anthony LaPaglia starred as East in the 2009 Australian feature film Balibo, which tells the story of the Balibo Five. The film was co-written by David Williamson and Robert Connolly and was based upon Cover-Up, a book by Jolliffe, as well as the work of Clinton Fernandes, who served as the film's historical consultant.

== See also ==
- Australia – East Timor relations
