= Indonesian Army Officer Candidate School =

Army Officer Candidate School
- Sekolah Calon Perwira Angkatan Darat
- Active: 8 January 1972
- Country: Indonesia
- Branch: Indonesian Army
- Type: Training
- Role: Train and commission Indonesian Army Officers
- Part of: Army Doctrine, Education and Training Development Command
- Garrison/HQ: Bandung, West Java
- Mottos: Viyata Pinaka Wiradhika ("Educating towards reliable officer")
- Anniversaries: 8 January
- Website: secapaad.mil.id

Commanders
- Commander: Maj. Gen. Niko Fahrizal
- Deputy Commander: Brig. Gen. Taufiq Hanafi

The Indonesian Army Officer Candidate School (Indonesian: Sekolah Calon Perwira Angkatan Darat, Secapa AD) located at Bandung, West Java trains, assesses, and evaluates potential commissioned officers in the Indonesian Army. Officer candidates are senior NCOs or warrant officers. Completing the Secapaad course is one of few routes of becoming a commissioned officer in the Army.

== Overview of the Secapaad ==
The Secapaad course is a rigorous 20-week, 5-6 month course designed to train, assess, evaluate, and develop officers with the rank of Second lieutenant within the Army. It is the shortest route on becoming commissioned officers compared to other officer training programs, it is only open to senior enlisted personnel and warrant officers holding minimum ranks of Master Sergeant and Warrant Officer Class 2.

== History ==
Historically, Secapaad course is designed to provide numbers of officer especially during the war of independence. Given the lack of training institutions until late 1945 (with the foundation of the Indonesian Military Academy), the first generation officers of the Army, either trained in the Koninklijke Militaire Academie in Breda before the Second World War or trained in the Pembela Tanah Air and the Japanese sponsored Heiho or in anti-Japanese guerilla units, began to train selected experienced NCOs to be commissioned as officers with the rank of second lieutenant via either battlefield commissions or meritorious commissions. When the first military academy closed in 1950, the modern day Secapaad began to unite branch-specific system of schools, since at one time there were separate schools each per basic branch, which also served as military academies until 1957 when the military academy was officially reopened in Magelang, Central Java.

The Secapaad was established as a secondary center for the training of Army Officers besides the Magelang-based Military Academy. On the initiative of the then Chief of Staff of the Army General Umar Wirahadikusumah, on Saturday 8 January 1972 the Army OCS was officially opened to the public with Colonel S. Banoearli as the first commandant, thus officially January 8, 1972 is designated as birthday of the Secapaad. Its Bandung campus also honors the former Military Technical Academy, which was fused into the military academy in 1962, a marker with the names of its top graduates, including that of 30 September Movement martyr Pierre Tendean, is located in the campus grounds.

== Mission ==
Secapaad's mission is the educational formation of qualified officers to serve in the performance of the basic responsibilities entrusted to the Army from among the ranks of experienced senior non-commissioned officers of the service.
