= Timothy Mo =

Hong Kong-born British novelist (born 1950)

- Born: Timothy Peter Mo; 30 December 1950 (age 75); British Hong Kong
- Occupation: Novelist
- Writing career
- Period: 1978–present
- Genre: Fiction

Chinese name
- Chinese: 毛翔青
Transcriptions
Standard Mandarin
- Hanyu Pinyin: Máo Xiángqīng
Yue: Cantonese
- Yale Romanization: Mòuh Chèuhngchīng
- Jyutping: Mou4 Coeng4-ching1

Timothy Peter Mo (born 30 December 1950) is a British Asian novelist. Born to a British mother and a Hong Kong father, Mo lived in Hong Kong until the age of 10, when he moved to Britain. Educated at Mill Hill School and St John's College, Oxford, Mo worked as a journalist before becoming a novelist.

His works have won the Geoffrey Faber Memorial Prize, the Hawthornden Prize, and the James Tait Black Memorial Prize (for fiction), and three of his novels were shortlisted for the Booker Prize for Fiction. Mo was also the recipient of the 1992 E. M. Forster Award. His novel An Insular Possession (1986) was among the contenders in The Telegraph's list of the 10 all-time greatest Asian novels.

In the early 1990s Mo became increasingly mistrustful of his publishers and increasingly outspoken about the publishing industry in general. Since 1994 when he rejected a £125,000 advance from Random House for his next novel, he has self-published his books under the label "Paddleless Press". His first novel to be self-published was Brownout on Breadfruit Boulevard.

== Background ==
Mo has been described as a British Asian author.

== Novels ==
- The Monkey King (1978)
- Sour Sweet (1982), filmed as Soursweet in 1988
- An Insular Possession (1986)
- The Redundancy of Courage (1991)
- Brownout on Breadfruit Boulevard (1995)
- Renegade or Halo2 (2000)
- Pure (2012)

== Awards ==
- 1979: Geoffrey Faber Memorial Prize for The Monkey King
- 1982: Booker Prize for Fiction (shortlist) for Sour Sweet
- 1982: Hawthornden Prize for Sour Sweet
- 1986: Booker Prize for Fiction (shortlist) for An Insular Possession
- 1991: Booker Prize for Fiction (shortlist) for The Redundancy of Courage
- 1992: E. M. Forster Award
- 1999: James Tait Black Memorial Prize (for fiction) for Renegade or Halo2
