= Jill Jolliffe =

Australian journalist and author (1945–2022)

Jill Jolliffe (7 February 1945 – 2 December 2022) was an Australian journalist and author who reported on East Timor since 1975. She was the author of Finding Santana and Balibo.

== Education and career ==
Educated at Geelong High School and Monash University, she visited East Timor with a student delegation in April 1975 while doing postgraduate work at the Australian National University. She witnessed the first incursions of Indonesian regular troops into East Timor in September 1975, and reported on the deaths of the Balibo Five the following month. She published her first book with University of Queensland Press in 1978, titled East Timor: Nationalism and Colonialism, which was written during her Young Writers Fellowship from the Literature Board of the Australia Council.

Jolliffe lived in Portugal from 1978 to 1999, reporting on Portugal, Angola and other ex-Portuguese colonies, as well as East Timor. She later returned to Australia to reside in Darwin. She was a correspondent for Nation Review, Reuters, UPI, The Guardian, The Sunday Times, The Age, The Sydney Morning Herald, and the BBC.

Jolliffe also directed her first television documentary The Pandora Trail in 1992 which exposed European prostitution rackets and Spanish, Portuguese and third world women enslavement.

Jolliffe was a Northern Territory finalist for the Senior Australian of the Year award in 2010.

== Work on East Timor ==
In 1994, she entered East Timor mountains from Indonesia to meet guerrilla leader Nino Konis Santana. She was captured by Indonesian military but despite that she was able to complete her documentary "Blockade". She covered wars in Angola and Western Sahara, and was banned from entering Indonesia because of her criticisms of the Indonesian invasion of East Timor and its aftermath. Jolliffe's 2001 book Cover-Up: the inside story of the Balibo Five tells the story of the capture and killing of the Balibo Five, subsequent evasion of the issue by the governments of Indonesia and Australia, and its connection with Indonesia's decision to invade and occupy East Timor. The book, researched by the author for over twenty years, "is as much an investigation of the Indonesian occupation of East Timor as it is a case study of the Balibo killings". The proposal to base a film on her book evinced some criticism of her views of "colleagues", as briefly reported in 2004 by one UK newspaper. The film Balibo was based on the book and released in 2009.

== Personal life and death ==
Jolliffe died on 2 December 2022, at the age of 77.

== Bibliography ==
=== Non-fiction ===
- Revolutionary Poems in the Struggle Against Colonialism as editor and translator, by Fransisco Borja da Costa, Wild & Woolley, Sydney (1976)
- Timor, Terra Sangrenta (Timor: The Killing Fields) (1989)
- Aviz: A Lisbon Story (1998)
- Depois Das Lagrimas (After the Tears) (2000, ed.)
- Cover-Up: The Inside Story of the Balibo Five Scribe, Melbourne (2001)
- Balibo (2009) – updated revision of Cover-Up in a film tie-in edition
- Finding Santana (2010)
- Run for Your Life, Affirm Press, South Melbourne (2014)

=== Selected book reviews ===
Year	Review article	Work(s) reviewed
2011	"Uncensored portraits". Australian Book Review (332): 68–70. June 2011.	Anderson, Fay & Trembath, Richard (2011). Witnesses to war : the history of Australian conflict reporting. Melbourne University Press.

== TV documentaries ==
- The Pandora Trail (1992) – about European prostitution rackets
- Blockade (1997) – story of East Timor's guerrilla struggle
- Foreign Correspondent special on Balibo Five (1998), with Jonathan Holmes
