= Balibo =

- town
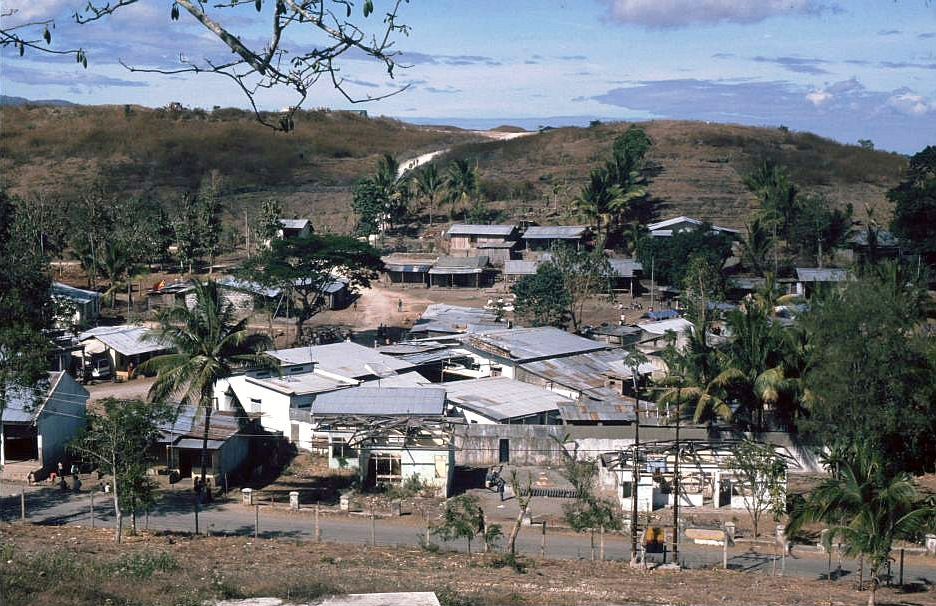
- Balibo town in 2003

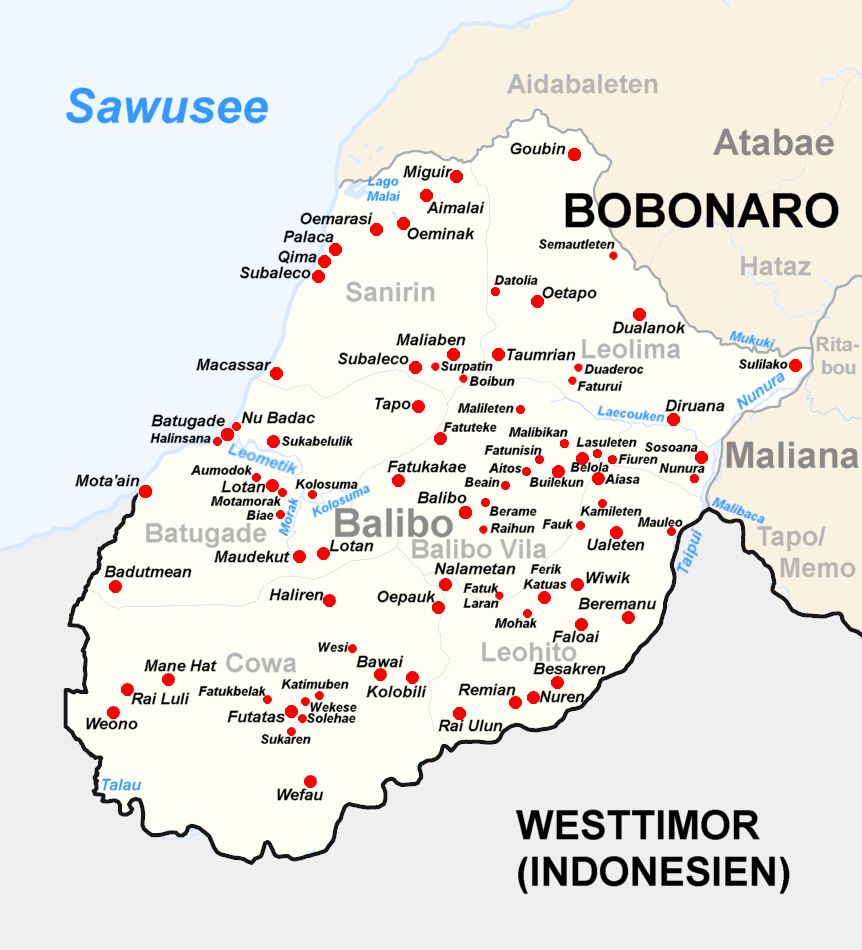
- Sub-district, suco and town of Balibo

- Location in Timor-Leste
- Coordinates: 8°58′S 125°02′E
- Country: Timor-Leste
- Admin. division: Bobonaro

Area
  - Total: 39.54 km^{2} (15.27 sq mi)

Population (2015)
  - Total: 3,933
- Time zone: UTC+9 (Time in Timor-Leste)
- Climate: Aw

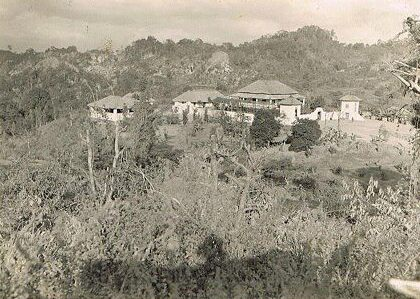
Portuguese military post Balibo in the 1930s

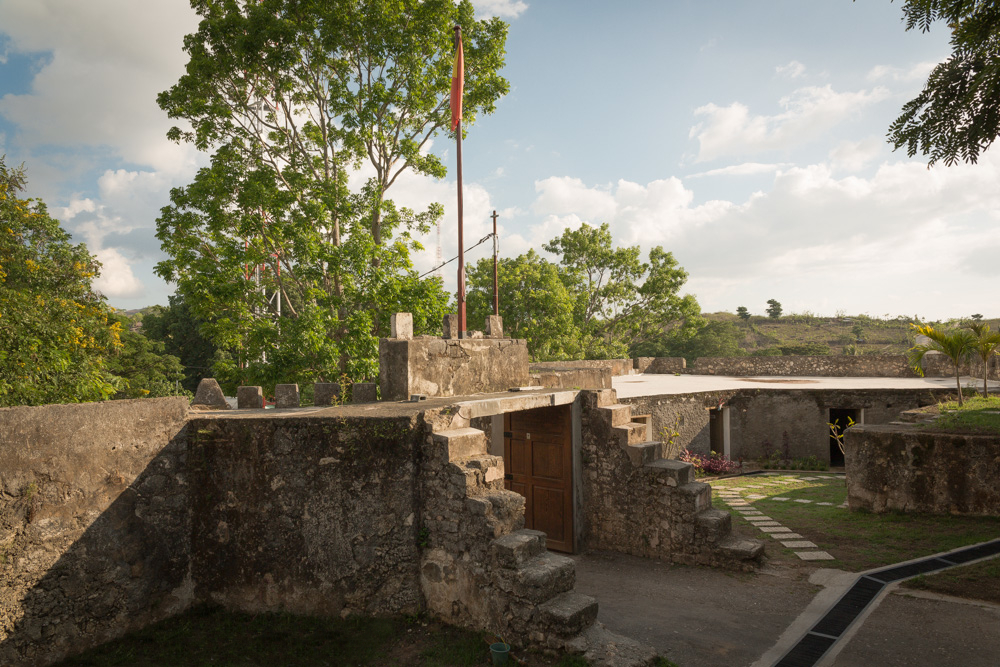
Former Portuguese fort in Balibo

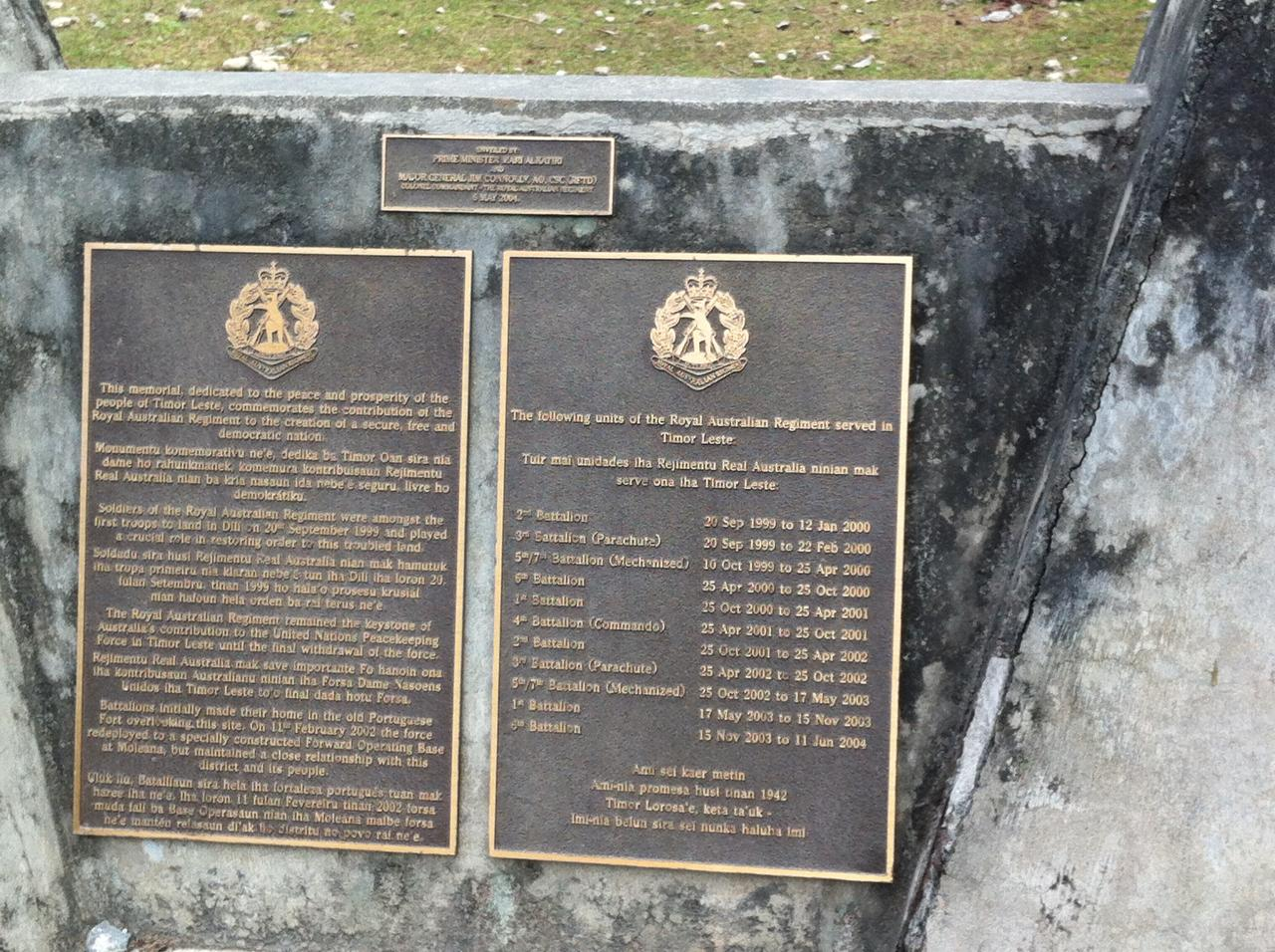
Memorial to the Royal Australian Regiment as part of INTERFET in Balibo

Balibo is a town in Timor-Leste situated approximately 10 kilometres (6.2 miles) from the Indonesian border. It is located in the sub-district of Balibo, Bobonaro District.

It was estimated by Human Rights Watch that 70 percent of the town was destroyed during the militia violence that preceded the vote on East Timorese independence.

Balibo achieved notoriety as the site of the killing of five Australian-based journalists, now known as the Balibo Five, by Indonesian forces in the 1970s. Australian reporters from Channels 7, 9 and ABC were covering an incursion by Indonesia into what was then Portuguese Timor. The reporters from Channels 7 and 9 were killed on 16 October 1975 by Indonesian Special Forces, to prevent information about the invasion from being released. In December 1975, another Australian reporter, Roger East, who was investigating the deaths of the other five, was reportedly seized by Indonesian soldiers, and then shot by a firing squad.

The town is home to a 400-year-old fort, which was the scene of several battles during the Indonesian invasion in 1975. The Balibo Five were also filming from the fort when Indonesian forces landed in Balibo on the day they died. The fort has been converted into a hotel as of 2016 by the Balibo House Trust, with support from the Rotary Club of Port Melbourne.

The Balibo Declaration, which criticised the declaration of independence, and was later used by the Indonesian government as partial justification for its invasion, was said to have been signed here, but was actually drafted by Indonesian intelligence and signed in Bali, Indonesia.

During the International Force East Timor (INTERFET) mission after the Indonesian withdrawal, the fort was used as a base for approximately one thousand United Nations (UN) troops, as part of Operation Lavarack. Kylie Minogue performed an unplugged concert in Balibo to entertain UN troops in 1999, as part of the Tour of Duty series of concerts.

In 2003, the government of Victoria, Australia purchased the house where the five journalists had stayed, as it had fallen into disrepair, and renovated it to serve as a creche, library, and vocational training centre. International aid organisations have also been involved in other reconstruction work in the town, such as the rebuilding of a dormitory for schoolchildren from remote communities that had been razed during the militia attacks.

== See also ==
- List of cities in East Timor
- 1999 East Timorese crisis
- Indonesian occupation of East Timor
- Australia and the Indonesian occupation of East Timor
