= Naueti language =

Austronesian language spoken in East Timor

Naueti
- Region: Southeast East Timor
- Native speakers: 16,500 (2015); 4,300 L2 speakers (2015 census)
- Language family: Austronesian: Malayo-Polynesian; Central–Eastern; Timor–Babar?; (unclassified); Kawaimina; Naueti

Language codes
- ISO 639-3: nxa
- Glottolog: naue1237
- ELP: Nauete
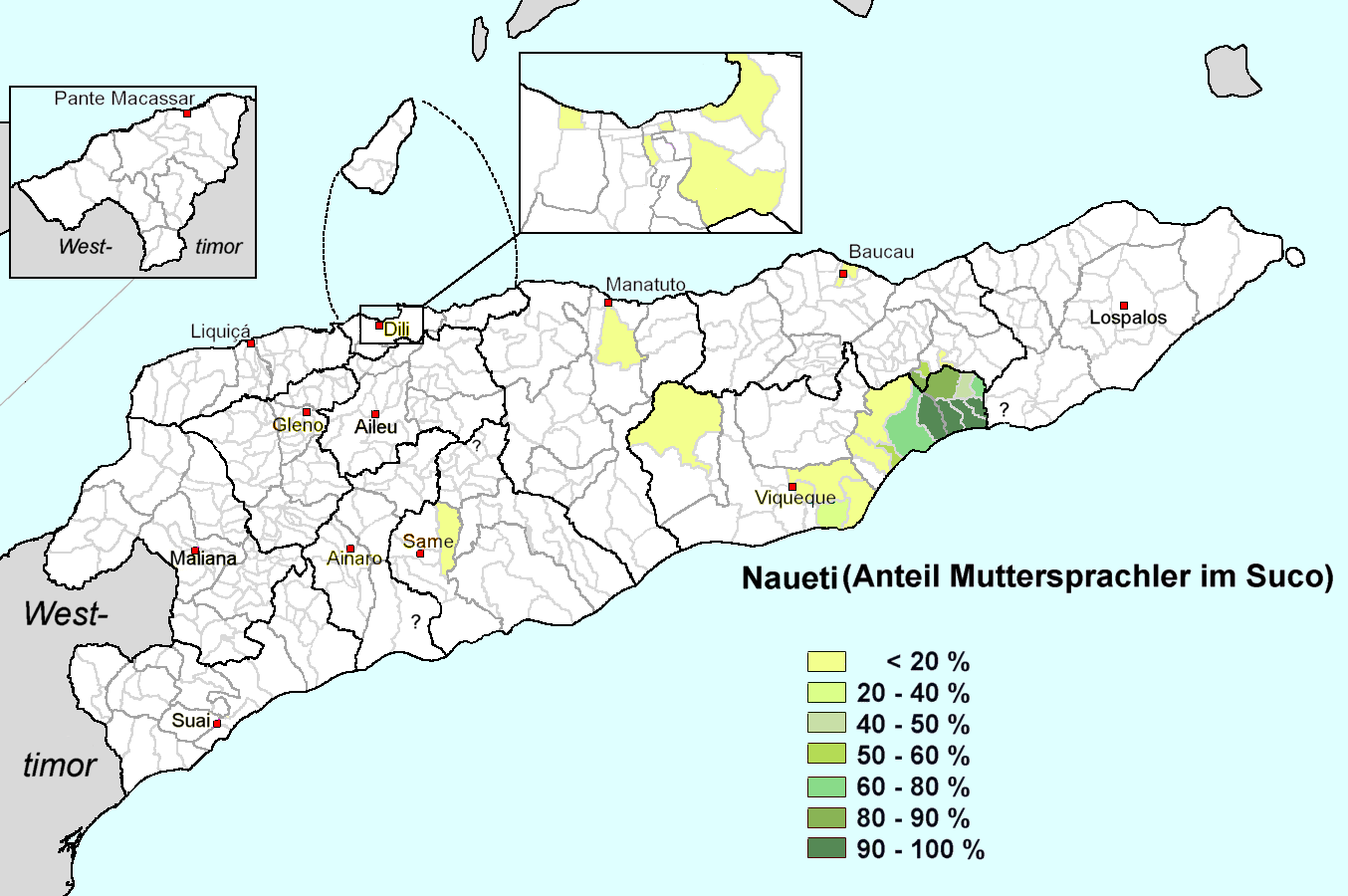
- Distribution of Nauete mother-tongue speakers in East Timor

Naueti (also written as Nauoti, Nauete and Nauweti but ultimately from Naueti nau eti 'now') is an Austronesian language spoken by 15,045 (census 2010) in the subdistricts of Uato-Lari, Uatucarbau and Baguia in southeastern East Timor. 1,062 Naueti are living in Baguia.

It is closely related to Waima'a, Kairui and Midiki, three other Austronesian languages spoken on Timor. The Australian linguist Geoffrey Hull coined the acronym Kawaimina to refer to them as a dialect continuum but it is preferable to understand them as separate languages. The Dutch linguist Aone Van Engelenhoven applies the label Eastern Extra-Ramelaic languages.

== Structure ==
Structurally, Naueti is a highly isolating Malayo-Polynesian language. However, its vocabulary is to some extent Papuan, due to contact with Makasae, which surrounds and cohabits with Naueti. There exist at least two dialects of Naueti, the Uatolari and the Uatocarbau-Baguia Naueti, the latter being distinguishable through some vocabulary, as well as the [g] allophone of /w/ before rounded vowels (e.g. /wono/ 'war' is pronounced [wono] in Uatolari but [gono] in Uatocarbau and Baguia). The variety of Naueti spoken in Uatolari is also reported to feature a higher percentage of Makasae loans as a result of increased contact. Alexandre Veloso (2016: 5–6) reports that most men over 20 in the Uatolari subdistrict have “at least excellent negotiation skills in Makasae”.

Just like its low-level related languages, Naueti has aspirated stops and voiceless sonorants but shows preglottalized phonemes instead of ejectives and has no preglottalized counterpart of Waima'a and Midiki /s'/. In contrast, Naueti has a voiceless rhotic that is missing in the other inventories.

=== Vowels ===
The vowel system is straightforward with vowels /a/, /e/, /i/, /o/ and /u/. There is no distinctive vowel length, as vowel sequences are heterosyllabic. Stress generally falls on the penultimate syllable, with very few native exceptions. Loanwords preserve their original stress.
