= Waimaha language =

Waimaha may be:

- Waimoa language in East Timor
- Waimajã language in Colombia
