= Timor-Leste =

Country in Southeast Asia

Democratic Republic of Timor-Leste
(in official languages)
Portuguese	República Democrática de Timor-Leste
Tetun	Repúblika Demokrátika Timór Lorosa'e
- Flag Emblem
- Motto: Unidade, Acção, Progresso (Portuguese) "Unity, Action, Progress"
- Anthem: Pátria (Portuguese) "Fatherland"
- Location of Timor-Leste (green) toward the eastern end of the Malay Archipelago
- Capital and largest city: Dili; 8.55°S 125.56°E
- Official languages: Portuguese; Tetun
- Recognised languages: 15 national languages: Atauru; Baikeno; Bekais; Bunak; Fataluku; Galoli; Habun; Idalaka; Kawaimina; Kemak; Makalero; Makasae; Makuva; Mambai; Tokodede; 2 working languages: English; Indonesian
- Religion (2015 census): 99.53% Christianity; 97.57% Catholicism; 1.96% Protestantism; 0.24% Islam; 0.23% other
- Demonyms: East Timorese; Timorese; Maubere (informal)
- Government: Unitary semi-presidential republic
  - President: José Ramos-Horta
  - Prime Minister: Xanana Gusmão
- Legislature: National Parliament

Independence from Portugal and Indonesia
  - Independence declared: 28 November 1975
  - Administered by UNTAET: 25 October 1999
  - Independence restored: 20 May 2002

Area
  - Total: 15,007 km^{2} (5,794 sq mi) (154th)
  - Water (%): Negligible

Population
  - 2026 estimate: ▲1,434,991 (153rd)
  - 2022 census: 1,341,737
  - Density: 94/km^{2} (243.5/sq mi) (123rd)
- GDP (PPP): 2025 estimate
  - Total: ▲$6.970 billion (169th)
  - Per capita: ▲$4,920 (152nd)
- GDP (nominal): 2025 estimate
  - Total: ▲$2.120 billion (176th)
  - Per capita: ▲$1,490 (157th)
- Gini (2014): 28.7 low inequality
- HDI (2023): 0.634 medium (142nd)
- Currency: United States dollar; Timor-Leste centavo; (USD)
- Time zone: UTC+9 (Timor-Leste Time)
- Calling code: +670
- ISO 3166 code: TL
- Internet TLD: .tl (Note: Former use of .tp has been phased out.)

Timor-Leste, (Note: /ˌtiːmɔːrˈlɛsteɪ, -lɛst/ TEE-mor-LESS-tay; Portuguese pronunciation: [tiˈmoɾ ˈlɛʃtɨ]) also known as East Timor, (Note: /ˈtiːmɔːr/ TEE-mor) officially the Democratic Republic of Timor-Leste, (Note: República Democrática de Timor-Leste (Portuguese); Repúblika Demokrátika Timór Lorosa'e (Tetun)) is a country in Southeast Asia. It comprises the eastern half of the island of Timor, the coastal exclave of Oecusse in the island's northwest, and the islands of Atauro and Jaco, for a total land area of 15,007 square kilometres (5,794 sq mi). Timor-Leste shares a land border with Indonesia to the west; Australia is the country's southern neighbour, across the Timor Sea. Dili, on the north coast of Timor, is its capital and largest city.

Timor was settled over time by various Papuan and Austronesian peoples, which created a diverse mix of cultures and languages linked to Southeast Asia and Melanesia. East Timor came under Portuguese influence in the sixteenth century, remaining a Portuguese colony until 1975. Internal conflict preceded a unilateral declaration of independence and an Indonesian invasion and annexation. The subsequent Indonesian occupation was characterised by extreme abuses of human rights, including torture and massacres, a series of events named the East Timor genocide. Resistance continued throughout Indonesian rule and in 1999, a United Nations–sponsored act of self-determination led Indonesia to relinquish control of the territory. On 20 May 2002, Timor-Leste became the first new sovereign state of the 21st century. That same year, relations with Indonesia were established and normalised, with Indonesia also supporting Timor-Leste's accession into ASEAN.

The national government is a semi-presidential system, with the popularly elected president sharing power with a prime minister appointed by the National Parliament. Power is centralised under the national government, although many local leaders have informal influence. The country maintains a policy of international cooperation and is a member of the Community of Portuguese Language Countries and ASEAN, and is an observer of the Pacific Islands Forum. The country remains relatively poor, with an economy that relies heavily on natural resources, especially oil, and foreign aid.

The total population is over 1.44 million at the 2026 census, and is heavily skewed towards young people because of a high fertility rate. Education has led to increasing literacy over the past half-century, especially in the two official languages of Portuguese and Tetun. High ethnic and linguistic diversity is reflected by the 30 indigenous languages spoken in the country. Most of the population practices Roman Catholicism, which coexists alongside strong local traditions and beliefs, especially in rural areas.

== Name ==
"Timor" is derived from timur, which means 'east' in Indonesian or Malay. "Leste" incidentally on the other hand also means "east" in Portuguese. Therefore, Timor-Leste simply translates to 'East East' in English.

In Indonesian or Malay, this results in the name Timor Timur (the name of the former de facto Indonesian province; Timor Leste is used instead to refer to the country). In Tetun, it is Timór Lorosa'e (lorosa'e means "east", literally translated as 'where the sun rises').

The official names under its constitution are "Democratic Republic of Timor-Leste" in English, "República Democrática de Timor-Leste" in Portuguese, and "Repúblika Demokrátika Timór-Leste" in Tetun. The official short form of the name is "Timor-Leste", and it uses the ISO codes TLS and TL.

== History ==
=== Prehistory and Classical era ===
Cultural remains at Jerimalai on the eastern tip of Timor-Leste have been dated to 42,000 years ago. The first known inhabitants are those who arrived during the Australo-Melanesian migration through the region, likely bringing the precursors to today's Papuan languages. A later migration of Austroasiatic-speakers is suspected, although no such languages remain. The arrival of Austronesian peoples brought new languages, and merged with existing cultures on the island. Timorese origin myths recount settlers sailing around the eastern end of the island before landing in the south. These people are sometimes noted as being from the Malay Peninsula or the Minangkabau highlands of Sumatra. Austronesian migration to Timor may be associated with the development of agriculture on the island.

While information is limited about the political system of Timor during this period, the island had developed an interconnected series of polities governed by customary law. Small communities, centred around a particular sacred house, were part of wider sucos (or principalities), which were themselves part of larger kingdoms led by a liurai. Authority within these kingdoms was held by two individuals, with the worldly power of the liurai balanced by the spiritual power of a rai nain, who was generally associated with the primary sacred house of the kingdom. These polities were numerous and saw shifting alliances and relations, but many were stable enough that they survived from initial European documentation in the 16th century until the end of Portuguese rule.

From perhaps the thirteenth century, the island exported sandalwood, which was valued both for its use in crafting and as a source of perfume. Timor was included in Southeast Asian, Chinese, and Indian trading networks by the fourteenth century, exporting sandalwood, honey, and wax. The island was recorded by the Majapahit Empire as a source of tribute. It was sandalwood that attracted European explorers to the island in the early sixteenth century. Early European presence was limited to trade, with the first Portuguese settlement being on the nearby island of Solor.

=== Portuguese era (1769–1975) ===
The Battle of Cailaco in 1726, part of a rebellion

Early Portuguese presence on Timor was very limited; trade was directed through Portuguese settlements on nearby islands. Only in the 17th century did they establish a more direct presence on the island, a consequence of being driven out of other islands by the Dutch. After Solor was lost in 1613, the Portuguese moved to Flores. In 1646, the capital moved to Kupang on Timor's west, before Kupang too was lost to the Dutch in 1652. The Portuguese then moved to Lifau, in what is now Timor-Leste's Oecusse exclave. Effective European occupation in the east of the island only began in 1769, when the city of Dili was founded, although actual control remained highly limited. A definitive border between the Dutch and Portuguese parts of the island was established by the Permanent Court of Arbitration in 1914 and remains the international boundary between the successor states Indonesia and Timor-Leste, respectively.

For the Portuguese, East Timor remained little more than a neglected trading post, with minimal investment in infrastructure and education, until the late nineteenth century. Even when Portugal established actual control over the interior of its colony, investment remained minimal. Sandalwood continued to be the main export crop and coffee exports became significant in the mid-nineteenth century.

At the beginning of the twentieth century, a faltering domestic economy prompted the Portuguese to extract greater wealth from its colonies, which was met with East Timorese resistance. The colony was seen as an economic burden during the Great Depression and received little support or management from Portugal.

During World War II, Dili was occupied by the Allies in 1941, and later by the Japanese beginning in 1942. The mountainous interior of the colony became the scene of a guerrilla campaign, known as the Battle of Timor. Waged by East Timorese volunteers and Allied forces against the Japanese, the struggle killed between 40,000 and 70,000 East Timorese civilians. The Japanese eventually drove the last of the Australian and Allied forces out in early 1943. Portuguese control resumed, however, after Japanese surrender at the end of World War II.

Portugal began investment in the colony in the 1950s, funding education and promoting coffee exports, but the economy did not improve substantially and infrastructure improvements were limited. Yearly growth rates remained low, near 2%. The formation of political parties and debates about independence following the 1974 Portuguese revolution led to a civil war in 1975. The small Portuguese administration fled, unable to reassert control.

The Revolutionary Front for an Independent East Timor (Fretilin) resisted a Timorese Democratic Union (UDT) coup attempt in August 1975, and unilaterally declared independence on 28 November 1975. Fearing a communist state within the Indonesian Archipelago, the Indonesian military launched an invasion of East Timor on 7 December 1975. Indonesia declared East Timor its 27th province on 17 July 1976. The United Nations Security Council opposed the invasion, and the territory's nominal status in the UN remained as "non-self-governing territory under Portuguese administration".

=== Indonesian occupation (1975–1999) ===
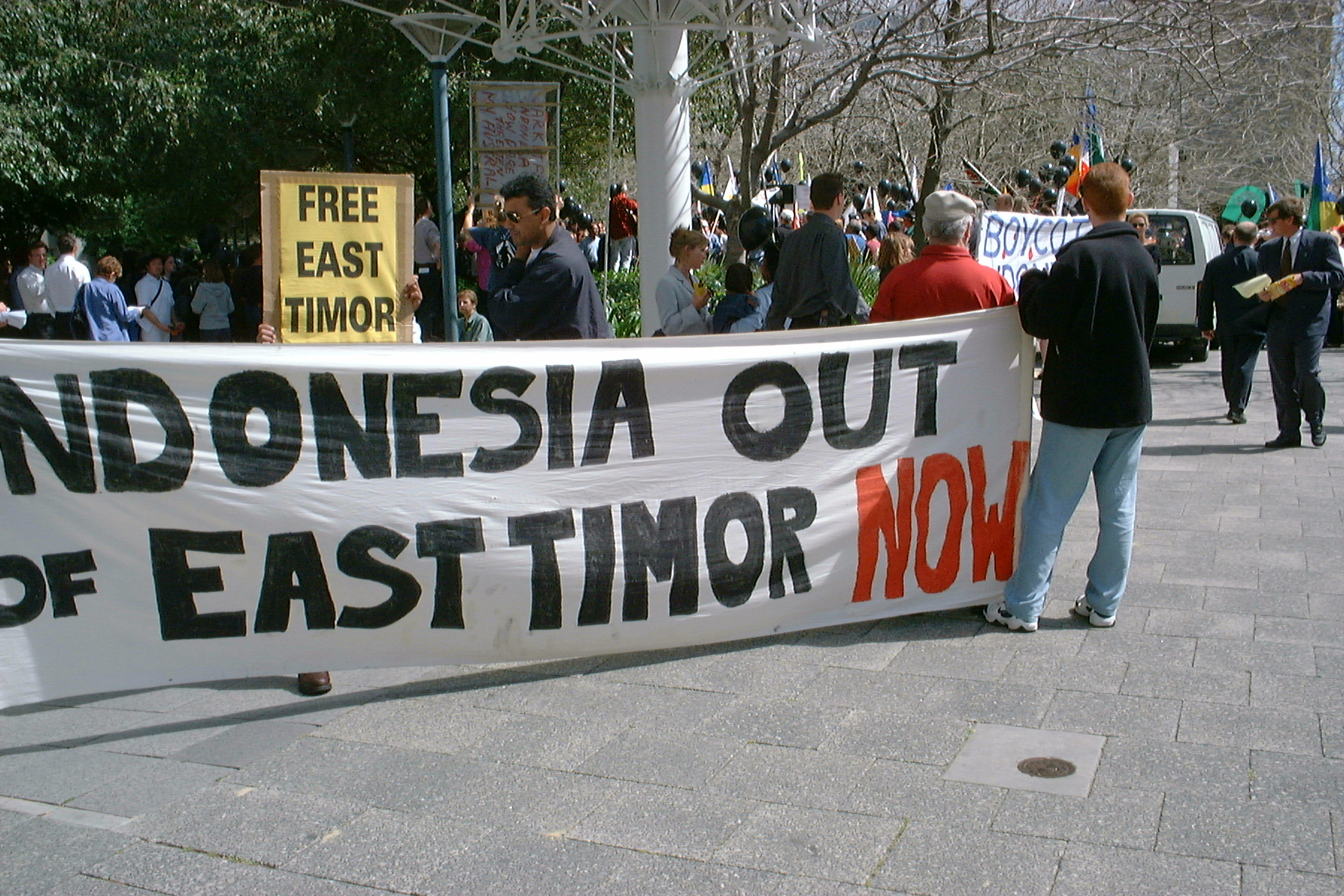
A demonstration for independence from Indonesia held in Australia during September 1999

Fretilin resisted the invasion, initially as an army, holding territory until November 1978, and then as a guerrilla resistance. The Indonesian occupation of Timor was marked by violence and brutality. A detailed statistical report prepared for the Commission for Reception, Truth and Reconciliation in East Timor cited a minimum of 102,800 conflict-related deaths in the period between 1974 and 1999, including approximately 18,600 killings and 84,200 excess deaths from hunger and illness. The total number of conflict-related deaths during this period is difficult to determine due to a lack of data. One estimate based on Portuguese, Indonesian, and Catholic Church data suggests it may have been as high as 200,000. Repression and restrictions counteracted improvements in health and education infrastructure and services, meaning there was little overall improvement in living standards; economic growth mostly benefited immigrants from elsewhere in Indonesia. A huge expansion of education was intended to increase Indonesian language use and internal security as much as it was for development.

The 1991 massacre of more than 200 demonstrators by the Indonesian military was a turning point for the independence cause, and brought increased international pressure on Indonesia. Following the resignation of Indonesian President Suharto, the new President BJ Habibie, prompted by a letter from Australian Prime Minister John Howard, decided to hold a referendum on independence. A UN-sponsored agreement between Indonesia and Portugal allowed for a UN-supervised popular referendum in August 1999. A clear vote for independence was met with a punitive campaign of violence by East Timorese pro-integration militias supported by elements of the Indonesian military. In response, the Indonesian government allowed a multinational peacekeeping force, INTERFET, to restore order and aid East Timorese refugees and internally displaced persons. On 25 October 1999, the administration of East Timor was taken over by the UN through the United Nations Transitional Administration in East Timor (UNTAET). INTERFET deployment ended in February 2000 with the transfer of military command to the UN.

=== Contemporary era ===
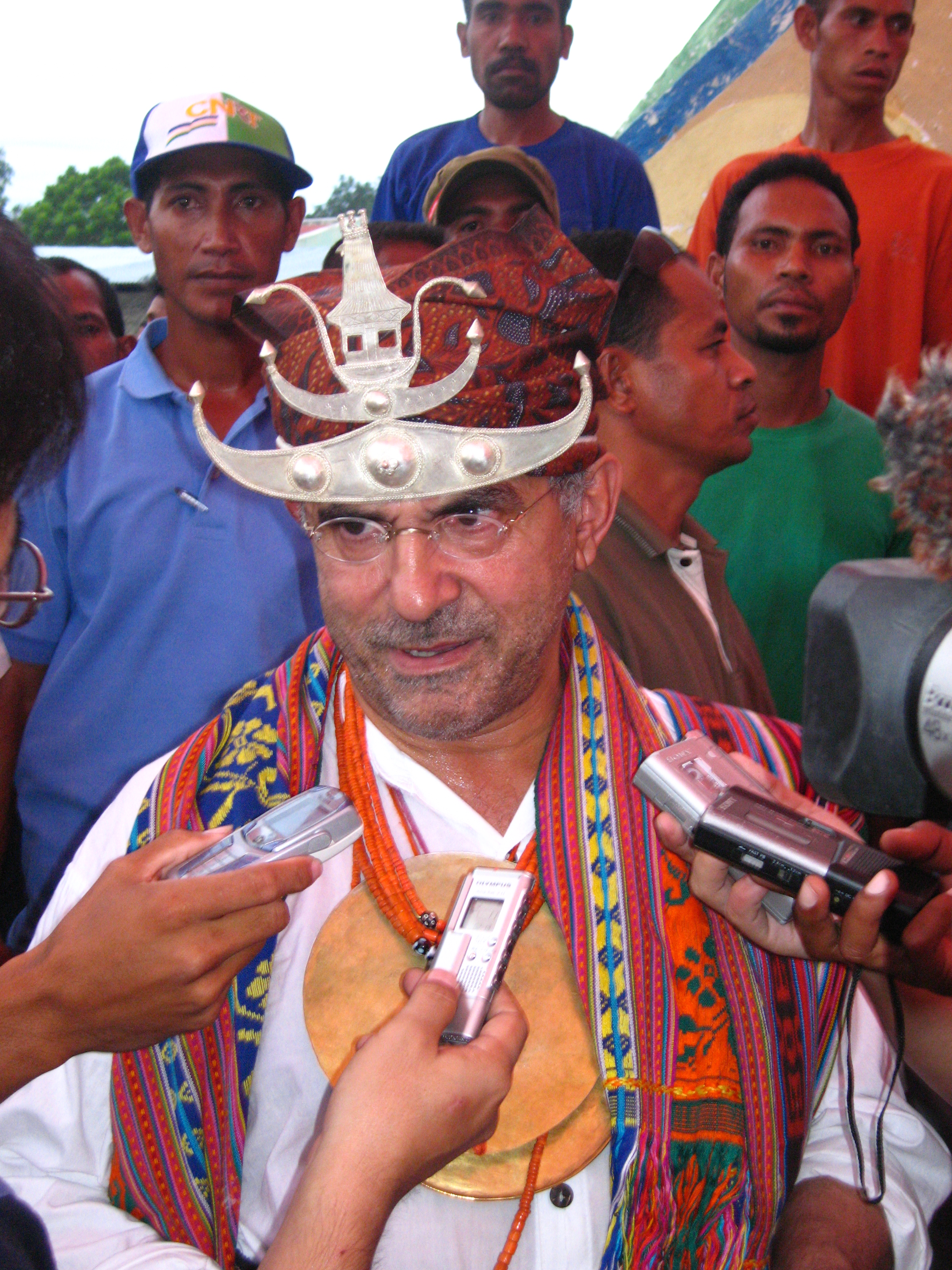
José Ramos-Horta, 1996 Nobel Peace Prize winner, fourth and seventh president of Timor-Leste

On 30 August 2001, the East Timorese voted in their first election organised by the UN to elect members of the Constituent Assembly. On 22 March 2002, the Constituent Assembly approved the Constitution. By May 2002, more than 205,000 refugees had returned. On 20 May 2002, the Constitution of the Democratic Republic of Timor-Leste came into force and Timor-Leste was recognised as independent by the UN. The Constituent Assembly was renamed the National Parliament, and Xanana Gusmão was elected as the country's first president. On 27 September 2002 the country became a UN member state.

In 2006, a crisis of unrest and factional fighting forced 155,000 people to flee their homes; the United Nations sent in security forces to restore order. The following year, Gusmão declined to run for another term. While there were minor incidents in the build-up to the mid-year presidential elections, the process was peaceful overall and José Ramos-Horta was elected president. In June 2007, Gusmão ran in the parliamentary elections and became prime minister at the head of the National Congress for Timorese Reconstruction (CNRT) party. In February 2008, Ramos-Horta was critically injured in an attempted assassination; Prime Minister Gusmão also faced gunfire separately but escaped unharmed. Australian reinforcements were immediately sent to help keep order. In March 2011, the UN handed over operational control of the police force to the Timor-Leste authorities. The United Nations ended its peacekeeping mission on 31 December 2012.

Francisco Guterres of the centre-left Fretilin party became president in May 2017. The leader of Fretilin, Mari Alkatiri, formed a coalition government after the July 2017 parliamentary election. This government soon fell, leading to a second general election in May 2018. In June 2018, former president and independence fighter, Taur Matan Ruak, became the new prime minister. José Ramos-Horta again became president on 20 May 2022 after winning the April 2022 presidential election runoff against Francisco Guterres. The 2026 ASEAN summit held in the Philippines, East Timor's Catholic ally, was the first ASEAN summit wherein East Timor participated as a full member of ASEAN.

== Geography ==
Map of Timor-Leste

Located between Southeast Asia and the South Pacific, the island of Timor is the largest of the Lesser Sunda Islands, which lie within the Malay Archipelago. The island is surrounded by the Ombai and Wetar Straits of the rougher Banda Sea in the north, and the calmer Timor Sea in the south. Timor-Leste shares the island with Indonesia, with Indonesian territory separating the Oecusse exclave from the rest of the country. The island of Atauro lies north of the mainland, with the fourth area being the small island of Jaco. The Savu Sea lies north of Oecusse. The country is about 265 kilometres (165 mi) long and 97 kilometres (60 mi) wide, with a total land area of 14,874 square kilometres (5,743 sq mi). This territory is situated between 8′15S – 10′30S latitude and 125′50E – 127′30E longitude. The country's coastline covers around 700 kilometres (430 mi), while the main land border with Indonesia is 125 kilometres (78 mi) long, and the Oecusse land border is around 100 kilometres (62 mi) long. Maritime borders exist with Australia to the south and Indonesia elsewhere. Timor-Leste has an exclusive economic zone of 77,051 km^{2} (29,750 mi^{2}).

The interior of the country is mountainous, with ridges of inactive volcanic mountains extending along the island. Almost half of the country has a slope of at least 40%. The south is slightly less mountainous, and has some plains near the coastline. The highest point is Tatamailau (also known as Mount Ramelau) at 2,963 metres (9,721 ft). Most rivers dry up at least partially during the dry season. Outside of some coastal areas and river valleys, the soil is shallow and prone to erosion, and its quality is poor. The capital and largest city is Dili. The second-largest city is the eastern town of Baucau.

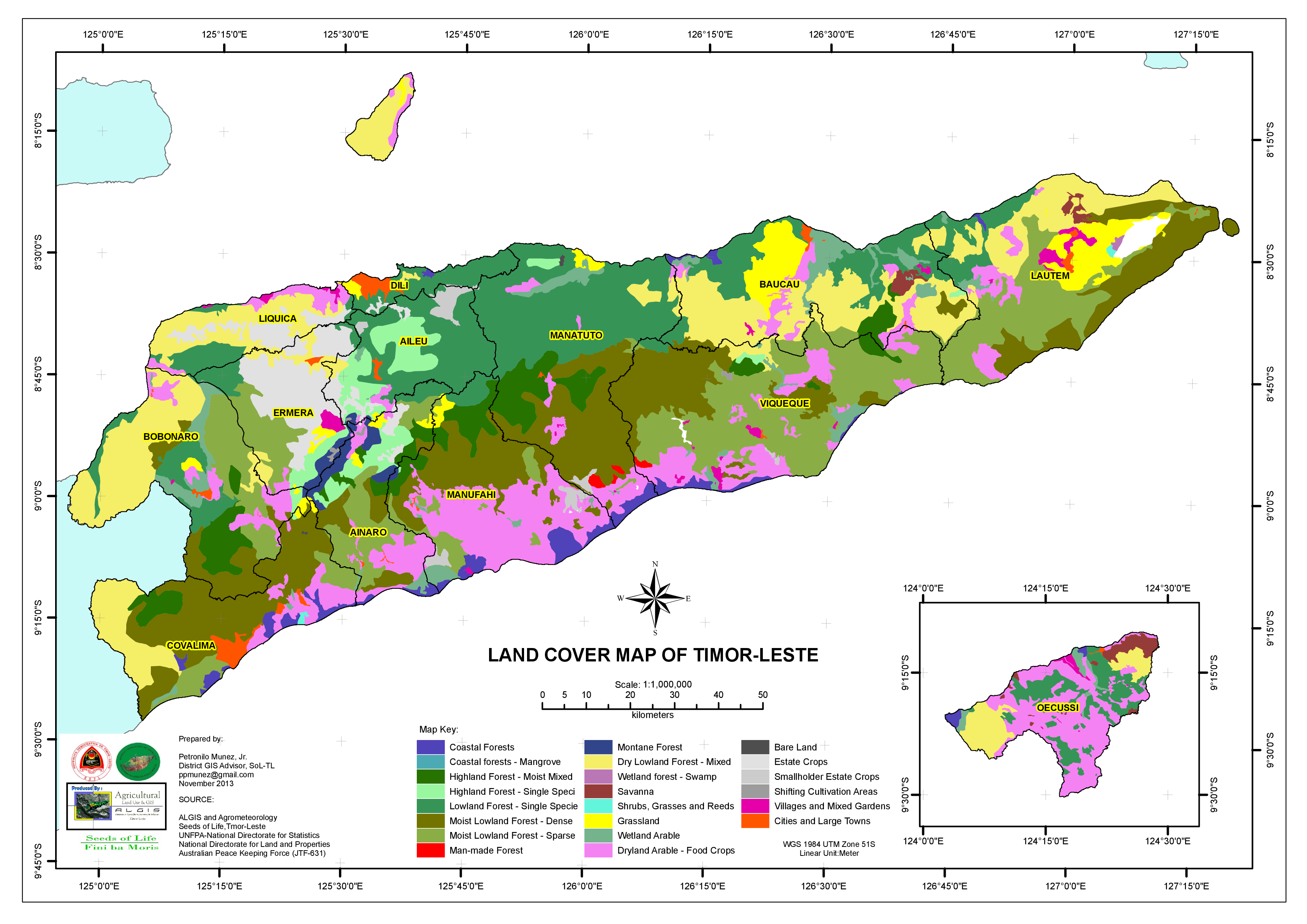
Land cover

The climate is tropical with relatively stable temperatures throughout the year. A wet season lasts from December to May throughout the country, and lasts slightly longer in the south and the interior due to the effect of a monsoon from Australia. During this period, rainfall can reach 222–252 millimetres (8.7–9.9 in) per month. In the dry season, it drops to 12–18 millimetres (0.47–0.71 in). The country is vulnerable to flooding and landslides that occur as a result of heavy rain, especially when rainfall levels are increased by the La Niña effect. The mountainous interior is cooler than the coasts. Coastal areas are heavily dependent on groundwater, which faces pressure from mismanagement, deforestation, and climate change. While the temperature is thought to have experienced a small increase due to climate change, there has been little change in annual rainfall.

Coastal ecosystems around the country are diverse and varied, with vary spatially between the north and south coastlines, as well as between the eastern tip and areas more to the west. These ecosystems include coral reefs, as the country's waters are part of the Coral Triangle biodiversity hotspot. The easternmost area of Timor-Leste consists of the Paitchau Range and the Lake Ira Lalaro area, which contains the country's first conservation area, the Nino Konis Santana National Park. It contains the last remaining tropical dry forested area within the country. It hosts a number of unique plant and animal species and is sparsely populated. The northern coast is characterised by a number of coral reef systems that have been determined to be at risk.

There are around 41,000 terrestrial plant species in the country. Forests covered 35% of Timor-Leste's land in the mid-2010s. The forests of the northern coast, central uplands, and southern coast are distinct. Timor-Leste is home to the Timor and Wetar deciduous forests ecoregion. There is some environmental protection in law, but it has not been a government priority. In addition to climate change, local ecosystems are threatened by deforestation, land degradation, overfishing, and pollution.

== Government and politics ==
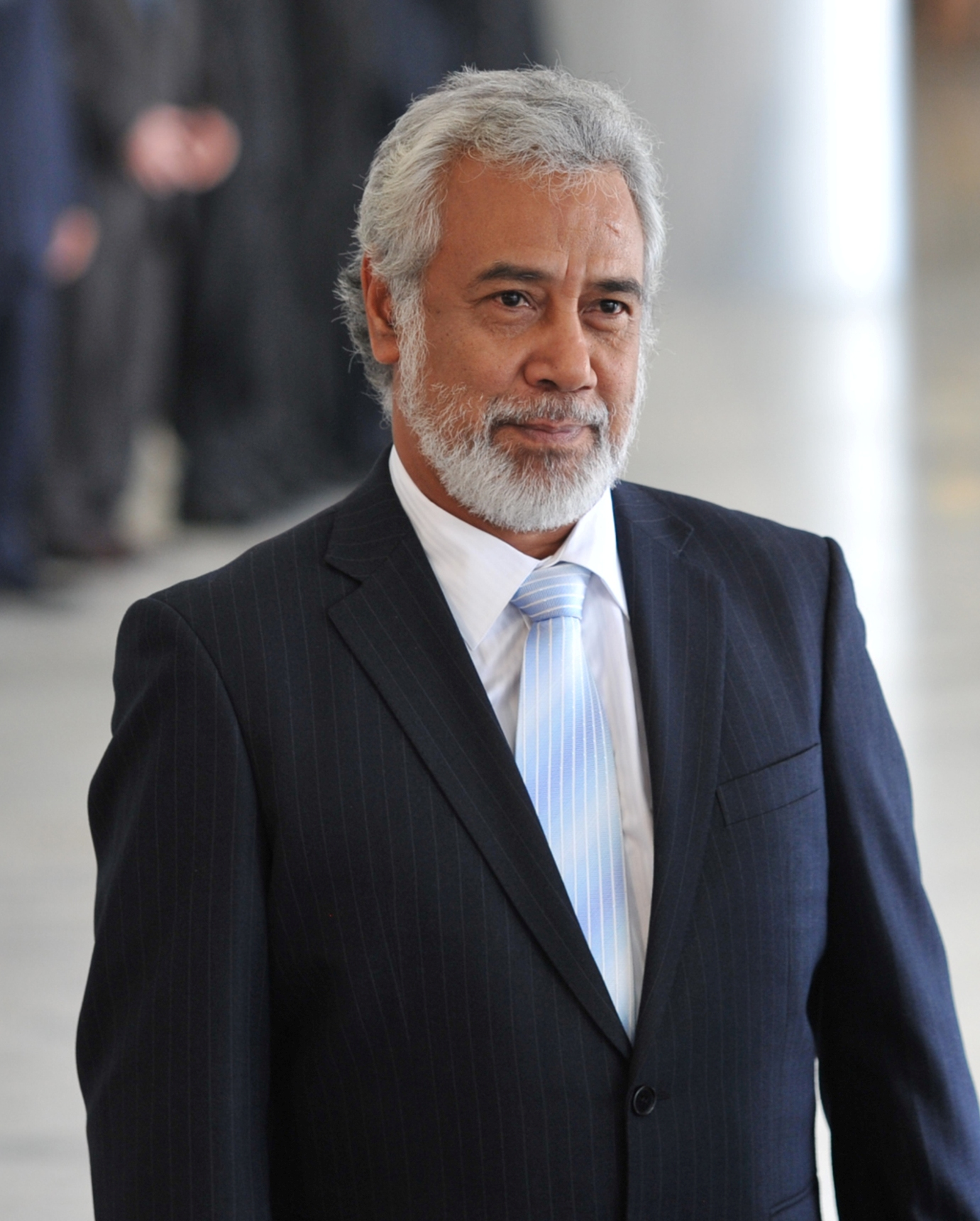
Xanana Gusmão, the first East Timorese president after the end of Indonesian occupation

The political system of Timor-Leste is semi-presidential, based upon the Portuguese system. The constitution establishes both this separation of executive powers between the president and the prime minister; and the separation of powers between the executive, legislature, and judiciary. Individuals are not allowed to participate in both the legislature and the executive branch. The legislature is intended to provide a check on the executive; in practice the executive has maintained control of the legislature under all political parties, reflecting the dominance of individual leaders within political parties and coalitions. The executive, through the council of ministers, also holds some formal legislative powers. The judiciary operates independently, although there are instances of executive interference. Some courts shift between locations, to improve access for those in more isolated areas. Despite political rhetoric, the constitution and democratic institutions have been followed by politicians, and changes of government are peaceful. Elections are run by an independent body, and turnout is high, ranging from around 70% to 85%. The political system has wide public acceptance.

The head of state of Timor-Leste is the president of the republic, who is elected by popular vote for a five-year term, and can serve a maximum of two terms. Formally, the directly elected president holds relatively limited powers compared to those in similar systems, with no power over the appointment and dismissal of the prime minister and the council of ministers. However, as they are directly elected, past presidents have wielded great informal power and influence. The president does have the power to veto government legislation, initiate referendums, and to dissolve parliament in the event that it is unable to form a government or pass a budget. If the president vetoes a legislative action, the parliament can overturn the veto with a two-thirds majority. The prime minister is chosen by the parliament, with the president appointing the leader of the majority party or coalition as prime minister of Timor-Leste and the cabinet on the proposal of the latter. As head of government, the prime minister presides over the cabinet.

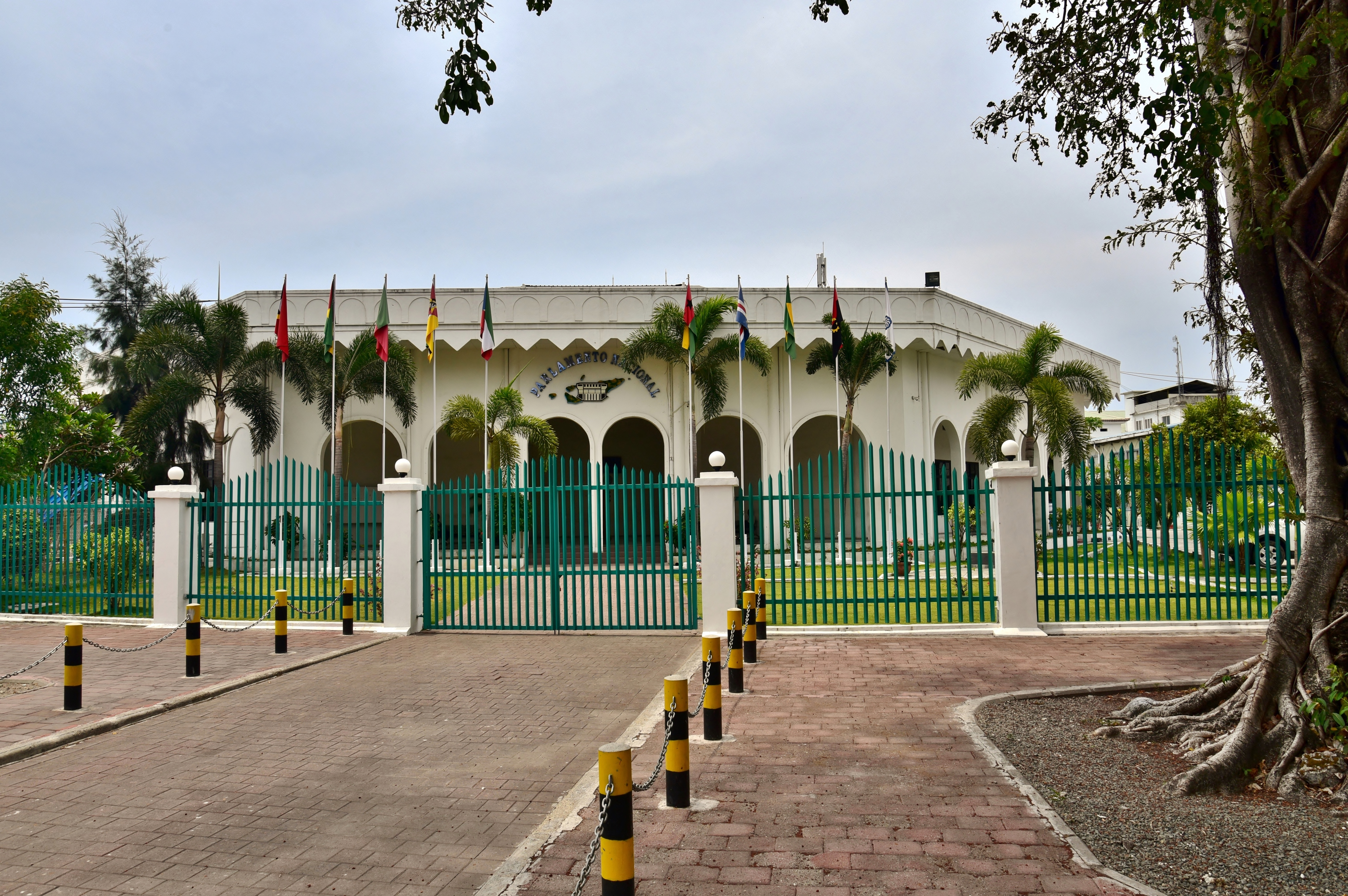
The National Parliament, fronted by flags of the Community of Portuguese Language Countries

Representatives in the unicameral National Parliament are elected by popular vote to a five-year term. The number of seats can vary from a minimum of fifty-two to a maximum of sixty-five. Parties must achieve 3% of the vote to enter parliament, with seats for qualifying parties allocated using the D'Hondt method. Elections occur within the framework of a competitive multi-party system. Upon independence, power was held by the Fretilin political party, which was formed shortly before the Indonesian invasion and led its resistance. Given its history, Fretilin viewed itself as the natural party of government and supported a multi-party system, expecting the development of a dominant-party system. Support from the United Nations and the international community, both before and after independence, allowed the nascent political system to survive shocks such as the 2006 crisis.

Candidates in parliamentary elections run in a single national district in a party-list system. Candidates appear ranked on single party lists. At least one of every three candidates presented by all political parties must be women. As such, women hold more than a third of parliamentary seats, but they are less prominent at other levels and within party leadership. While this party-list system promotes a diversity of political parties, it gives voters little influence over the individual candidates selected by each party.

Political divisions exist along class lines and along geographical lines. There is broadly a divide between eastern and western areas of the country, stemming from differences that arose under Indonesian rule. Fretilin in particular is strongly linked to the Eastern areas. Political parties are more closely associated with prominent personalities than with ideology. The National Congress for Timorese Reconstruction (CNRT) became the main opposition to Fretilin, following its establishment to allow Xanana Gusmão to run for Prime Minister in the 2007 parliamentary elections. While both major parties have been relatively stable, they remain led by an "old guard" of individuals who came to prominence during the resistance against Indonesia.

Politics and administration is centred in the capital Dili, with the national government responsible for most civil services. Oecusse, separated from the rest of the country by Indonesian territory, is a special administrative region with some autonomy. The National Police of Timor-Leste and Timor-Leste Defence Force have held a monopoly on violence since 2008 and very few guns are present outside of these organisations. While there are allegations of abuse of power, there is some judicial oversight of police and public trust in the institution has grown. An active civil society functions independently of the government, as do media outlets. Civil society organisations are concentrated in the capital, including student groups. Due to the structure of the economy, there are no powerful trade unions. The Catholic Church has strong influence in the country.

=== Administrative divisions ===
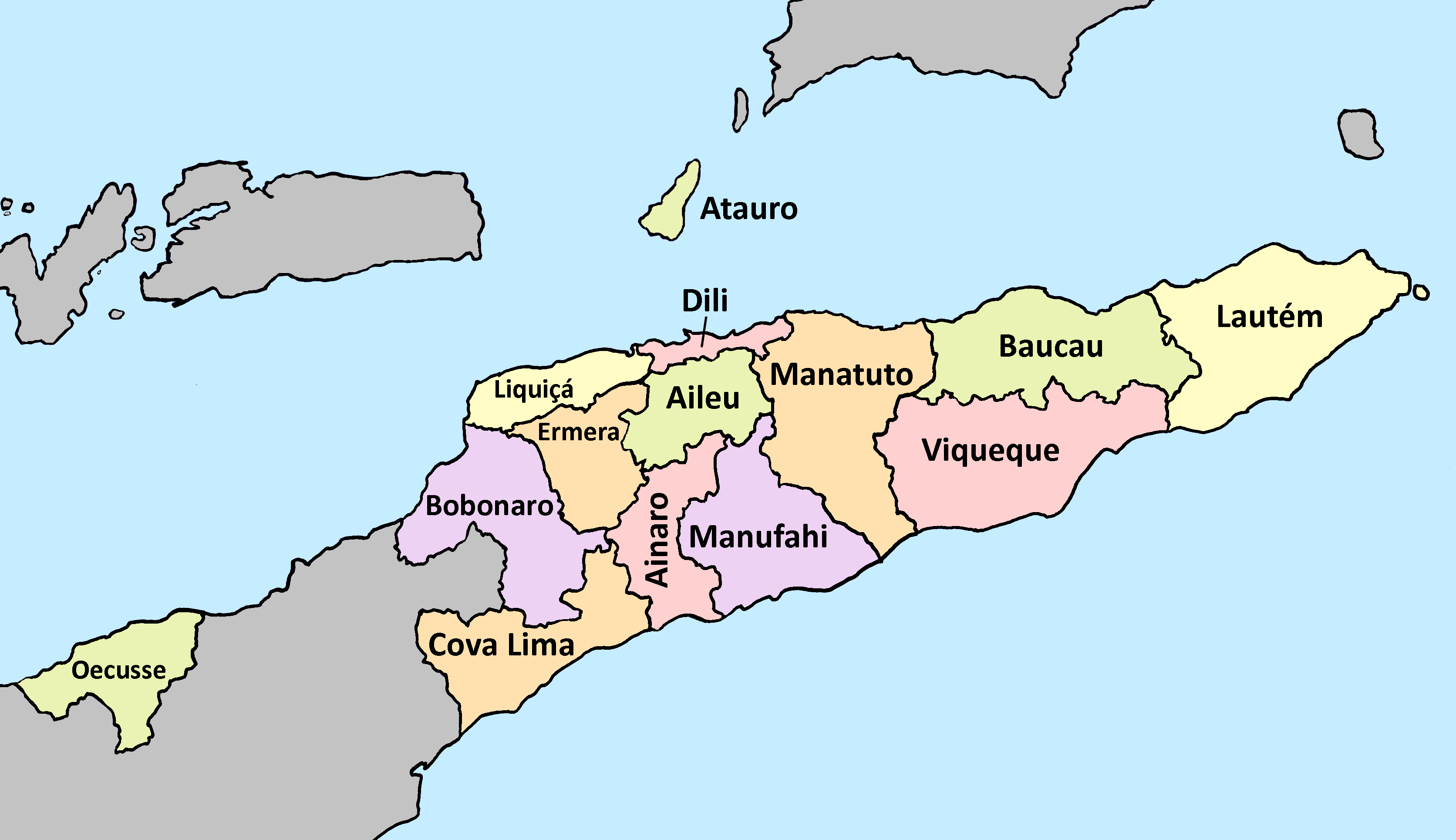
The fourteen municipalities of Timor-Leste

Timor-Leste is divided into fourteen municipalities, which in turn are subdivided into 64 administrative posts, 442 sucos (villages), and 2,225 aldeias (hamlets). The municipalities are the following:

Municipalities	Capital	Population (2022)
1. Aileu	Aileu	54,631
2. Ainaro	Ainaro	72,989
3. Atauro	Vila Maumeta	10,302
4. Baucau	Baucau	133,881
5. Bobonaro	Maliana	106,543
6. Cova Lima	Suai	73,909
7. Dili	Dili	324,269
8. Ermera	Gleno	138,080
9. Lautém	Lospalos	69,836
10. Liquiçá	Liquiçá	83,689
11. Manatuto	Manatuto	50,989
12. Manufahi	Same	60,536
13. Oecusse	Pante Macassar	80,726
14. Viqueque	Viqueque	80,054
Timor-Leste	Dili	1,340,434

The existing system of municipalities and administrative posts was established during Portuguese rule. While decentralisation is mentioned in the constitution, administrative powers generally remain with the national government operating out of Dili. Upon independence there was debate about how to implement decentralisation; various proposed models would create different levels of administration between the sucos and the central government. In most proposals, there were no specific provisions for suco-level governance, and they were expected to continue to exist as mostly traditional spaces, identifying communities rather than being part of the civil administration. In the end, the existing districts were kept and renamed municipalities in 2009, and received very few powers.

In 2016, changes were made so that each municipality is led by a civil servant appointed by the central government. This civil servant is advised by locally elected leaders. The isolated Oecusse municipality, which has a strong identity and is fully surrounded by Indonesian territory, is specified by Articles 5 and 71 of the 2002 constitution to be governed by a special administrative policy and economic regime. Law 3/2014 of 18 June 2014 implemented this constitutional provision, which went into effect in January 2015, turning Oecusse into a Special Administrative Region. The region began operating its own civil service in June 2015. In January 2022 the island of Atauro, formerly an Administrative Post of Dili, became its own municipality. Due to its small population, which the government states is insufficient to elect a Municipal Assembly, there are plans to convert Atauro to a Special Economic Zone similar to Oecusse.

Administration in the lowest levels of the administrative system of Timor-Leste, the aldeias and sucos, generally reflects traditional customs, reflecting community identity and relationships between local households. Sucos generally contain 2,000 to 3,000 inhabitants. Their long persistence and links to local governance means the sucos are the level of government that is linked to community identities, rather than any high level of administration. Such relationships, however, are associated specifically with the kinship groups within that land, rather than the land itself. Relationships between sucos also reflect customary practices, for example through the reciprocal exchanging of support for local initiatives. Laws passed in 2004 provided for the election of some suco officials, but assigned these positions no formal powers. An updated law in 2009 established the expected mandate of these positions, although it continued to leave them outside of the formal state system, reliant on municipal governments to provide formal administration and services. Further clarification was given in 2016, which entrenched the treatment of sucos and aldeias more as communities than formal levels of administration. Despite this lack of formal association with the state, suco leaders hold great influence and are often seen by their community as representatives of the state. They have responsibilities usually associated with civic administration.

=== Foreign relations ===
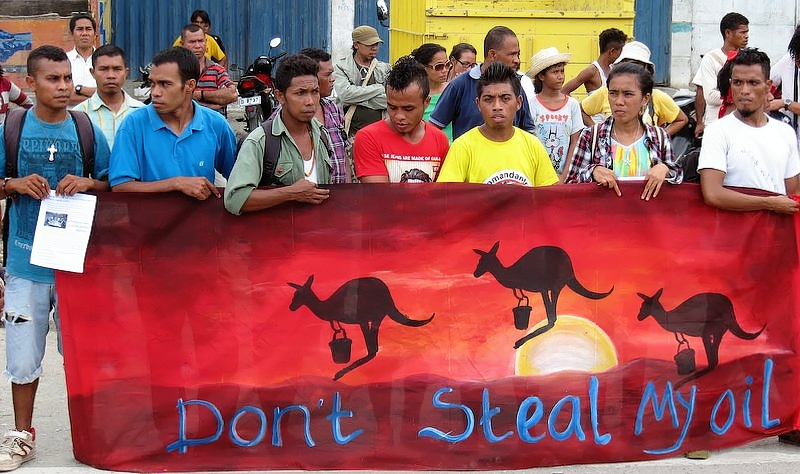
Demonstration against Australia in December 2013

International cooperation has always been important to Timor-Leste; donor funds made up 80% of the budget before oil revenues began to replace them. International forces also provided security, with five UN missions sent to the country from 1999. The final one, the United Nations Integrated Mission in East Timor, began after the 2006 East Timorese crisis and concluded in 2012.

Timor-Leste formally applied to join ASEAN in 2011, and was granted observer status and accepted "in principle" in November 2022. Despite the nationalist political leadership promoting closer ties with Melanesian states, the country has targeted ASEAN membership since before its independence, with its leaders stating that joining Pacific bodies would have precluded ASEAN membership. ASEAN membership was sought for economic and security reasons, including to improve the relationship with Indonesia. Nonetheless, the process has been slow due to a lack of support from some ASEAN states and concerns about Timor-Leste's institutional capacity to meet ASEAN's commitments. As part of its efforts to demonstrate commitment and capacity, Timor-Leste had established diplomatic missions in each ASEAN member state by 2016. On 27 May 2025, Malaysian Prime Minister Anwar Ibrahim, ASEAN chair for the year, announced that Timor-Leste would be admitted as the regional bloc's 11th full member during the ASEAN Summit scheduled for October 2025 in Kuala Lumpur, subject to the completion of remaining obligations under the economic pillar. Timor-Leste is an observer to the Pacific Islands Forum and the Melanesian Spearhead Group. More broadly, the country is a leader within the Group of Seven Plus (g7+), an organisation of fragile states. It is also a member of the Community of Portuguese Language Countries.

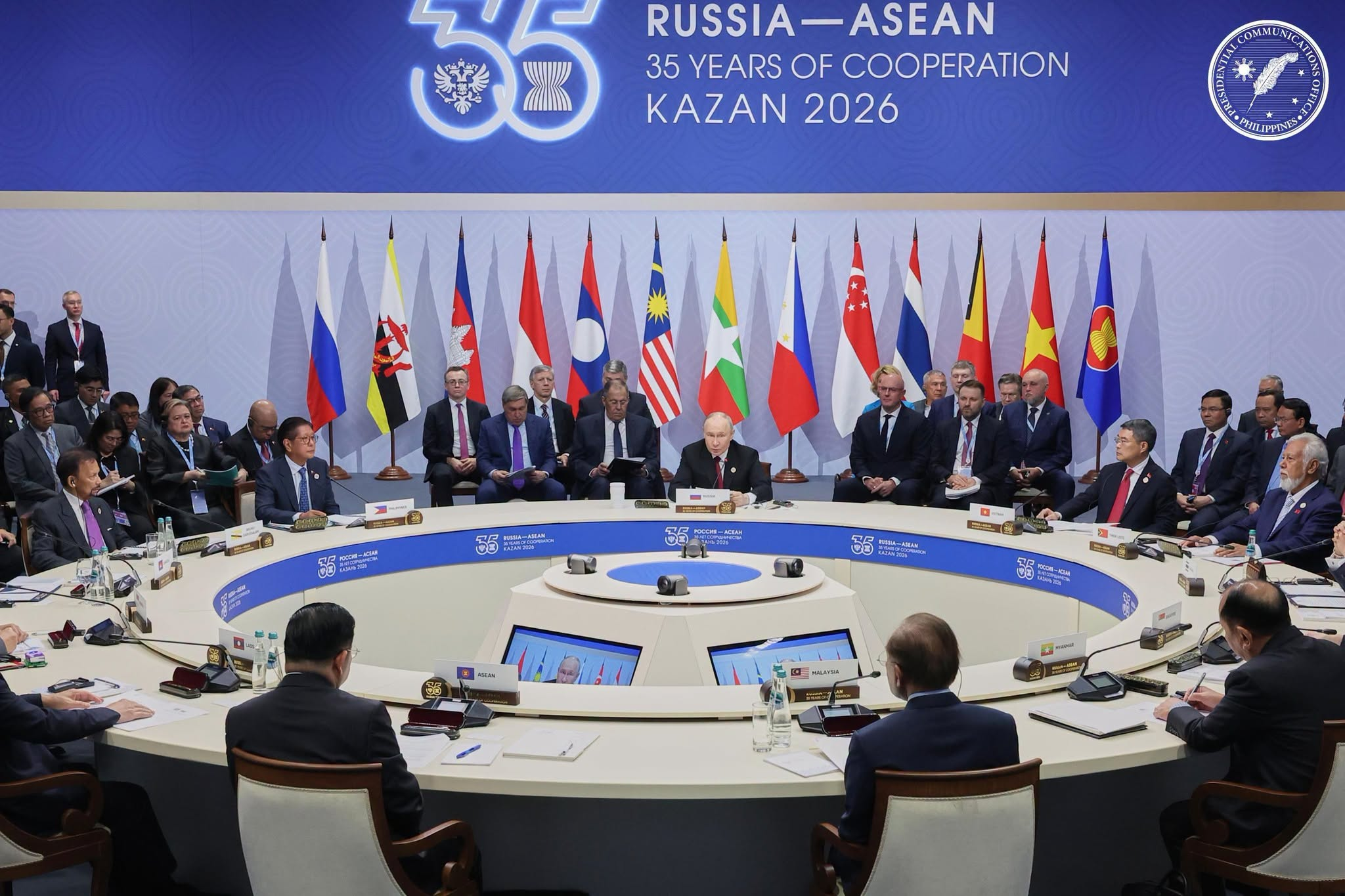
Timor-Leste President Xanana Gusmão and other ASEAN leaders at the ASEAN–Russia Commemorative Summit in Kazan, Russia, 18 June 2026

Continuing bilateral donors include Australia, Portugal, Germany, and Japan, and Timor-Leste has a reputation for effectively and transparently using donor funds. Good relations with Australia and with Indonesia are a policy goal for the government, despite historical and more-recent tensions. These countries are important economic partners and provide most transport links to the country. China has also increased its presence by contributing to infrastructure in Dili.

The relationship with Australia was dominated from before independence by disputes over natural resources in the ocean between them, hampering the establishment of a mutually agreed border. The dominance of Australian hard power led Timor-Leste to utilise public diplomacy and forums for international law to push their case. The dispute was resolved in 2018 following conciliation procedures before the Permanent Court of Arbitration, when the two states established by treaty a maritime boundary between them along with an agreement on natural resource revenues.

=== Military ===
The Timor-Leste Defence Force (F-FDTL) was established in 2001, replacing Falintil, and was restructured following the events of 2006. It is responsible not only for safeguarding against external threats, but also for addressing violent crime, a role it shares with the National Police of Timor-Leste. These forces remain small: 2,200 soldiers in the regular army and 80 in a naval component. A single aircraft and seven patrol boats are operated, and there are plans to expand the naval component. There is some military cooperation with Australia, Portugal, and the United States.

== Economy ==
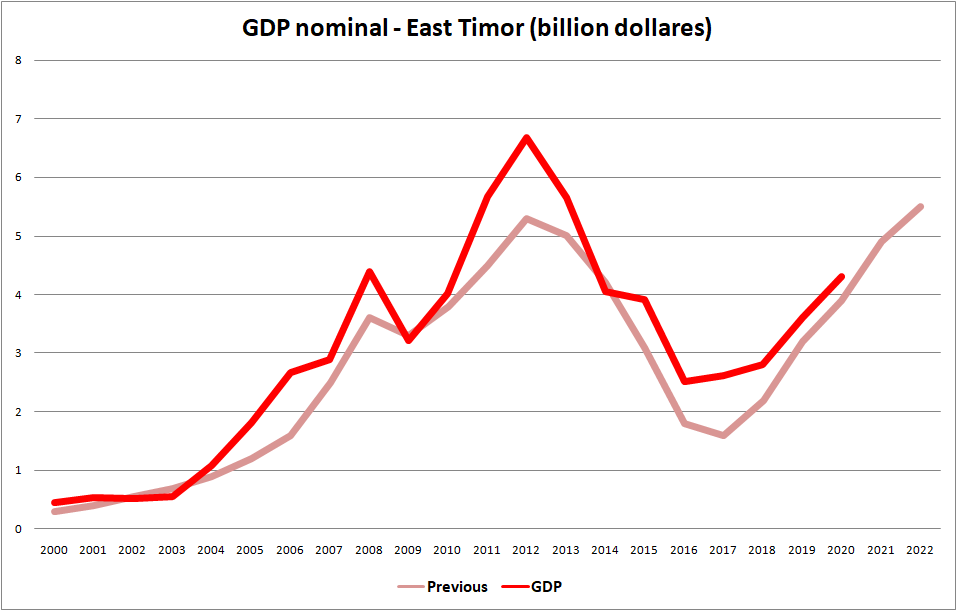
Nominal GDP of Timor-Leste (previous and data)

The economy of Timor-Leste is a market economy, although it is dependent upon the export of a few commodities and has a large public sector. Internally, market operations are limited by widespread poverty. The country uses the United States dollar, producing its own coins to facilitate smaller transactions. The economy is generally open to foreign investment, although a prohibition on foreigners owning land means many require a local partner in the country. Competition is limited by the small size of the economy, rather than any government barriers. There are far more imports than exports, and prices for goods are often higher than in nearby countries. Inflation is strongly affected by government spending. Growth has been slow, averaging just 2.5% per year from 2011 to 2021.

Most of the country is very poor, with just more than 40% living under the national poverty line. This poverty is especially prevalent in rural areas, where many are subsistence farmers or fishermen. Even in urban areas, the majority are poor. Overall, women are poorer than men, often being employed in lower-paying careers. Malnutrition is common, with over half of children showing stunted growth. While 91% of married working age (15–49) men were employed as of 2016, only 43% of married working age women were. There are small disparities in favour of men in terms of home and land ownership and owning a bank account. The eastern three municipalities, which contain around a quarter of the population, has less poverty than the western areas, which contain 50% of the population.

Sixty-six per cent of families are in part supported by subsistence activities; however, the country as a whole does not produce enough food to be self-sustaining, and thus relies on imports. Agricultural work carries the implication of poverty, and the sector receives little investment from the government. Ninety-four per cent of domestic fish catch comes from the ocean, especially coastal fisheries. Those in the capital of Dili are on average better off, although they remain poor by international standards. The small size of the private sector means the government is often the customer of public businesses. A quarter of the national population works in the informal economy, with the official public and private sectors employing 9% each. Of those of working age, around 23% are in the formal sector, 21% are students, and 27% are subsistence farmers and fishers. The economy is mostly cash-based, with little commercial credit available from banks. Remittances from overseas workers add up to around $100 million annually.

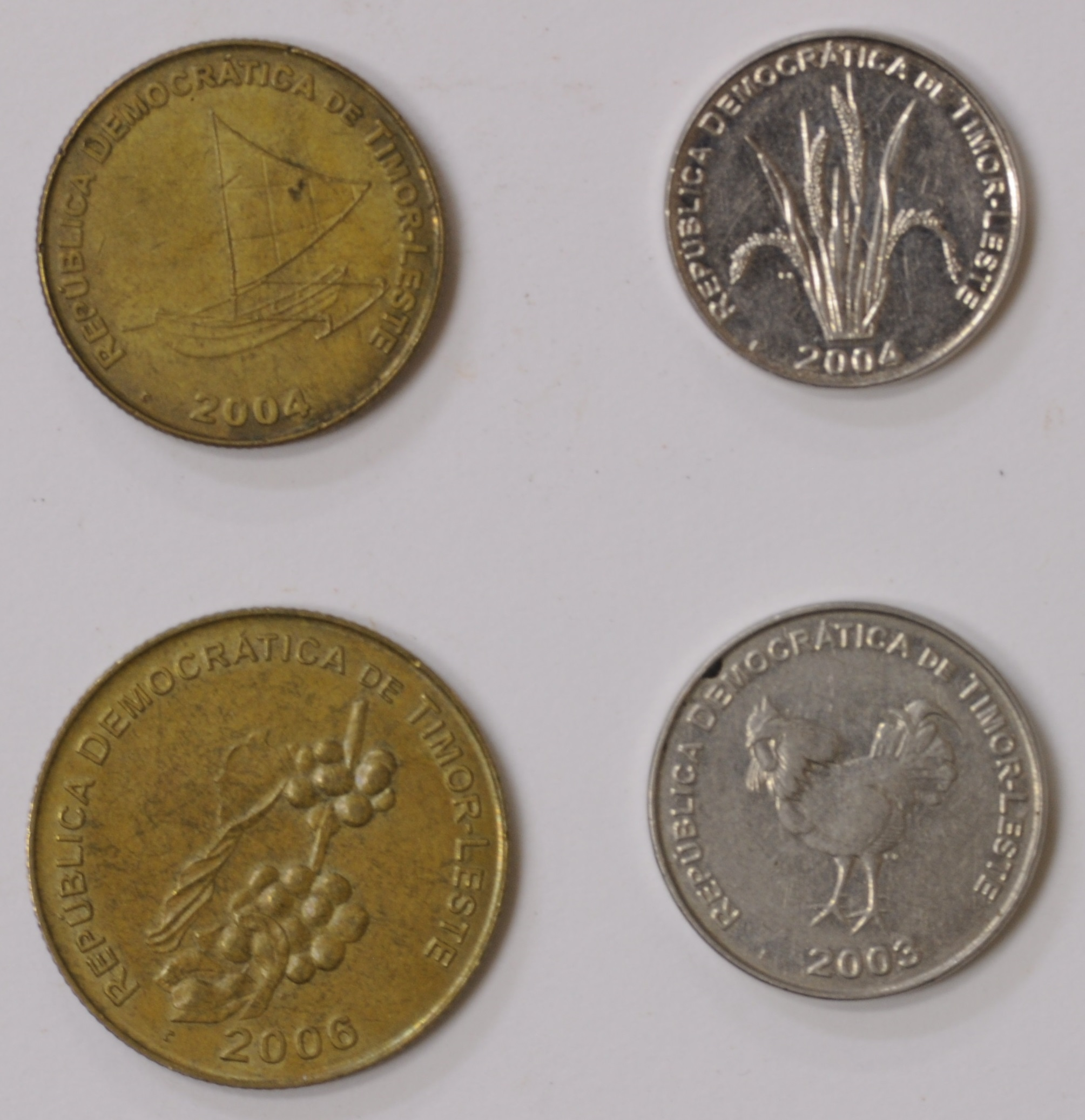
Fractional coins, "centavos", used locally as part of the United States dollar

This poverty belies significant wealth in terms of natural resources, which at the time of independence had per capita value equivalent to the wealth of an upper-middle income country. Over half of this was in oil, and over a quarter in natural gas. The Timor-Leste Petroleum Fund was established in 2005 to turn these non-renewable resources into a more sustainable form of wealth. From 2005 to 2021, $23 billion earned from oil sales has entered the fund. $8 billion has been generated from investments, while $12 billion has been spent. A decrease in oil and gas reserves led to decreasing HDI beginning in 2010. Eighty per cent of government spending comes from this fund, which as of 2021 had $19 billion, 10 times greater than the size of the national budget. As oil income has decreased, the fund is at risk of being exhausted. Withdrawals have exceeded sustainable levels almost every year since 2009. Resources within the Bayu-Undan field are expected to soon run out, while extracting those within the so far undeveloped Greater Sunrise field has proven technically and politically challenging. Remaining potential reserves are also losing value as oil and gas become less favoured sources of energy.

The country's economy is dependent on government spending and, to a lesser extent, assistance from foreign donors. Government spending decreased beginning in 2012, which had knock-on effects in the private sector over the following years. The government and its state-owned oil company often invest in large private projects. Decreasing government spending was matched with a decrease in GDP growth. After the petroleum fund, the second largest source of government income is taxes. Tax revenue is less than 8% of GDP, lower than many other countries in the region and with similarly sized economies. Other government income comes from 23 "autonomous agencies", which include port authorities, infrastructure companies, and the National University of Timor-Leste. Overall, government spending remains among the highest in the world, although investment into education, health, and water infrastructure is negligible.

Private sector development has lagged due to human capital shortages, infrastructure weakness, an incomplete legal system, and an inefficient regulatory environment. Property rights remain ill-defined, with conflicting titles from Portuguese and Indonesian rule, as well as needing to accommodate traditional customary rights. As of 2010, 87.7% of urban (321,043 people) and 18.9% of rural (821,459 people) households have electricity, for an overall average of 38.2%. The private sector shrank between 2014 and 2018, despite a growing working age population. Agriculture and manufacturing are less productive per capita than at independence. Non-oil economic sectors have failed to develop, and growth in construction and administration is dependent on oil revenue. The dependence on oil shows some aspects of a resource curse. Coffee made up 90% of all non-fossil fuel exports from 2013 to 2019, with all such exports totalling to around US$20 million annually. In 2017, the country was visited by 75,000 tourists.

== Demographics ==
Population pyramid

Timor-Leste recorded a population of 1,183,643 in its 2015 census, which rose to 1,341,737 at the 2022 census. The population lives mainly along the coastline, where all urban areas are located. Those in urban areas generally have more formal education, employment prospects, and healthcare. While a strong gender disparity exists throughout the country, it is less severe in the urban capital. The wealthy minority often go abroad for health, education and other purposes. The population is young, with the median age being under 20. In particular, a large proportion of the male population over 14 (almost 45% in 2015) are between the ages of 15 and 24, the third largest male 'youth bulge' in the world.

The Government of Timor-Leste's website lists the English-language demonym for Timor-Leste as Timorese. Other reference sources list it as East Timorese. The word Maubere formerly used by the Portuguese to refer to native East Timorese and often employed as synonymous with the illiterate and uneducated, was adopted by Fretilin as a term of pride.

Healthcare received 6% of the national budget in 2021. From 1990 to 2019 life expectancy rose from 48.5 to 69.5. Expected years of schooling rose from 9.8 to 12.4 between 2000 and 2010, while mean years of schooling rose from 2.8 to 4.4. Progress since 2010 for these has been limited. Gross national income per capita similarly peaked in 2010, and has decreased since. As of 2016, 45.8% of East Timorese were impoverished, 16.3% severely so. The fertility rate, which at the time of independence was the highest in the world at 7.8, dropped to 4.2 by 2016. It is relatively higher in rural areas, and among poorer and less literate households. As of 2016, the average household size was 5.3, with 41% of people aged under 15, and 18% of households headed by women. Infant mortality stood at 30 per 1,000, down from 60 per 1,000 in 2003. 46% of children under 5 showed stunted growth, down from 58% in 2010. Working age adult obesity increased from 5% to 10% during the same time period. As of 2016, 40% of children, 23% of women, and 13% of men had anaemia.

Largest cities and towns in Timor-Leste www.citypopulation.de/en/timor/cities/
Rank	Name	Municipalities	Pop.
1	Dili	Dili	244,584
2	Baucau	Baucau	17,357
3	Maliana	Bobonaro	12,787
4	Lospalos	Lautém	12,471
5	Pante Macassar	Oecusse	12,421
6	Suai	Cova Lima	9,130
7	Ermera	Ermera	8,045
8	Same	Manufahi	7,332
9	Viqueque	Viqueque	6,530
10	Ainaro	Ainaro	6,250

=== Ethnicity ===
Timorese communities are not strictly defined by ethnic background or linguistic group. Separate communities may share ethnicity or language, and many areas show overlaps and hybridisation between ethnic and linguistic groups. Familial relations and descent, which are interlinked with sacred house affiliation, are a more important indicator of identity. Each family group generally identifies with a single language or dialect. With this immense local variation in mind, there is a broad cultural and identity distinction between the east (Baucau, Lautém, and Viqueque municipalities) and the west of the country, a product of history more than it is of linguistic and ethnic differences, although it is very loosely associated with the two language groups. There is a small mestiço population of mixed Portuguese and local descent. There is also a small Chinese minority, most of whom are Hakka. Many Chinese left in the mid-1970s as many were disproportionately targeted during the Indonesian occupation, but a significant number have also returned to Timor-Leste following the end of Indonesian occupation. Timor-Leste has a small community of Timorese Indian, specifically of Goan descent, as well as historical immigration from Africa due to these countries having also been Portuguese colonies. There is also a minority of Yemeni descent due to Hadhrami traders settling in Timor. Members of these immigrant minority groups have played important roles in Timor-Leste's history: Nobel Peace Prize laureate, former Prime Minister, and current President José Ramos-Horta, and current Prime Minister and former President Xanana Gusmão are both of Portuguese-Timorese mestiço background, while former Prime Minister and FRETILIN secretary-general Mari Alkatiri is a Hadhrami Arab whose ancestors were from Yemen.

=== Language ===
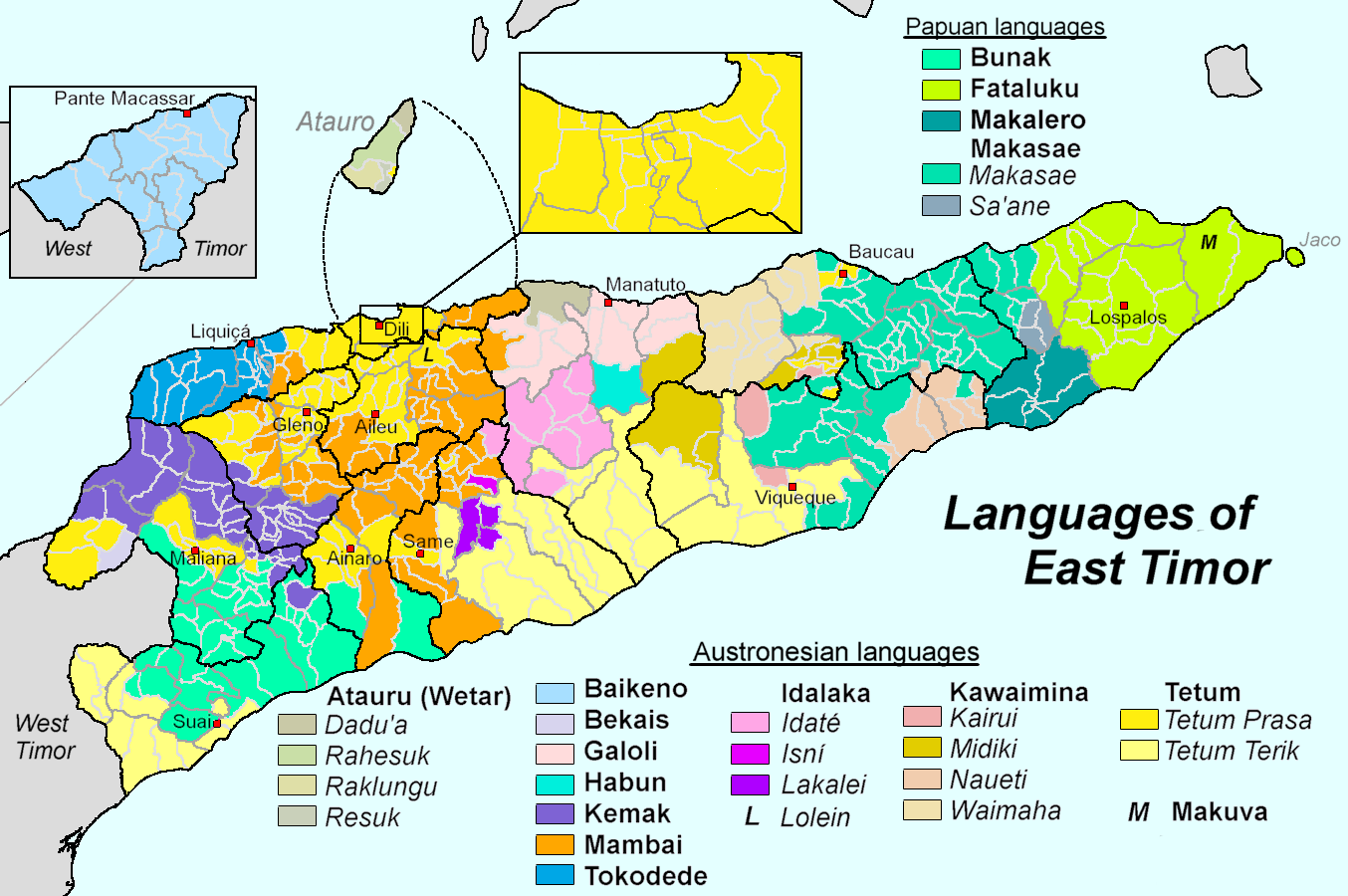
Major language groups in Timor-Leste by suco

Timor-Leste's two official languages are Portuguese and Tetun. East Timor is the only sovereign country in Asia where Portuguese is an official language. In addition, English and Indonesian are designated by the constitution as "working languages". This is within the Final and Transitional Provisions, which do not set a final date. In 2012, 35% could speak, read, and write Portuguese, which is up significantly from less than 5% in the 2006 UN Development Report. Portuguese is recovering as it has now been made the main official language of Timor, and is being taught in most schools. The use of Portuguese for government information and in the court system provides some barriers to access for those who do not speak it. Tetun is also not understood by everyone in the country. According to the Observatory of the Portuguese Language, the East Timorese literacy rate was 77.8% in Tetun, 55.6% in Indonesian, and 39.3% in Portuguese, and that the primary literacy rate increased from 73% in 2009 to 83% in 2012. According to the 2015 census, 50% of the population between the ages of 14 and 24 can speak and understand Portuguese. The 2015 census found around 15% of those over the age of five were literate in English.

Likely reflecting the mixed origins of the different ethnolinguistic groups of the island, the indigenous languages fall into two language families: Austronesian and Papuan. Depending on how they are classified, there are up to 19 indigenous languages with up to 30 dialects. Aside from Tetun, Ethnologue lists the following indigenous languages: Adabe, Baikeno, Bunak, Fataluku, Galoli, Habun, Idaté, Kairui-Midiki, Kemak, Lakalei, Makasae, Makuv'a, Mambae, Nauete, Tukudede, and Waima'a. According to the Atlas of the World's Languages in Danger, there are six endangered languages in Timor-Leste: Adabe, Habu, Kairui-Midiki, Maku'a, Naueti, and Waima'a. The largest Malayo-Polynesian group is the Tetun, mostly around Dili or the western border. Other Malayo-Polynesian languages with native speakers of more than 40,000 are Mambai in the central mountains south of Dili, Baikeno in Oecusse, Kemak in the north-west interior, and Tokodede on the northwest coast. The main Papuan languages spoken are Bunak in the centre of Timor, especially within Bobonaro Municipality; Makasae in the eastern Baucau and Viqueque municipalities; and Fataluku in the eastern Lautém Municipality. The 2015 census found that the most commonly spoken mother tongues were Tetun Prasa (mother tongue for 30.6% of the population), Mambai (16.6%), Makasai (10.5%), Tetun Terik (6.05%), Baikenu (5.87%), Kemak (5.85%), Bunak (5.48%), Tokodede (3.97%), and Fataluku (3.52%). Other indigenous languages accounted for 10.47%, while 1.09% of the population spoke foreign languages natively.

=== Religion ===
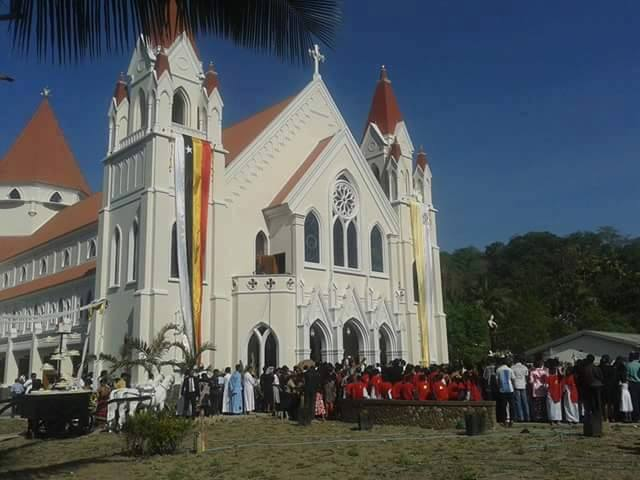
Imaculada Conceição church, in Viqueque

While the Constitution of Timor-Leste enshrines the principles of freedom of religion and separation of church and state, Section 45 Comma 1 also acknowledges "the participation of the Catholic Church in the process of national liberation" in its preamble. Upon independence, the country joined the Philippines to become the only two predominantly Catholic states in Asia, although nearby parts of eastern Indonesia such as Flores and parts of Western New Guinea also have Catholic majorities.

According to the 2022 census, 97.6% of the population is Catholic, 1.979% Protestant, 0.24% Muslim, 0.08% Traditional, 0.05% Buddhist, 0.02% Hindu, and 0.08% other religions. A 2016 survey conducted by the Demographic and Health Survey programme showed that Catholics made up 98.3% of the population, Protestants 1.2%, and Muslims 0.3%.

The number of churches grew from 100 in 1974 to more than 800 in 1994, with Church membership having grown considerably under Indonesian rule as Pancasila, Indonesia's state ideology, requires all citizens to believe in God and historically did not recognise traditional beliefs. East Timorese animist belief systems did not fit with Indonesia's constitutional monotheism, resulting in mass conversions to Christianity. Portuguese clergy were replaced with Indonesian priests and Latin and Portuguese Mass was replaced by Indonesian Mass. While just 20% of East Timorese called themselves Catholics at the time of the 1975 invasion, the figure surged to reach 95% by the end of the first decade after the invasion. The Catholic Church divides Timor-Leste into three dioceses: the Archdiocese of Díli, the Diocese of Baucau, and the Diocese of Maliana. In rural areas, Catholicism is often syncretised with local animist beliefs.

The number of Timorese Protestants and Muslims declined significantly after September 1999, as these groups were disproportionately represented among supporters of integration with Indonesia. Fewer than half of previous Protestant congregations existed after September 1999, and many Protestants were among those who remained in West Timor.

=== Education ===
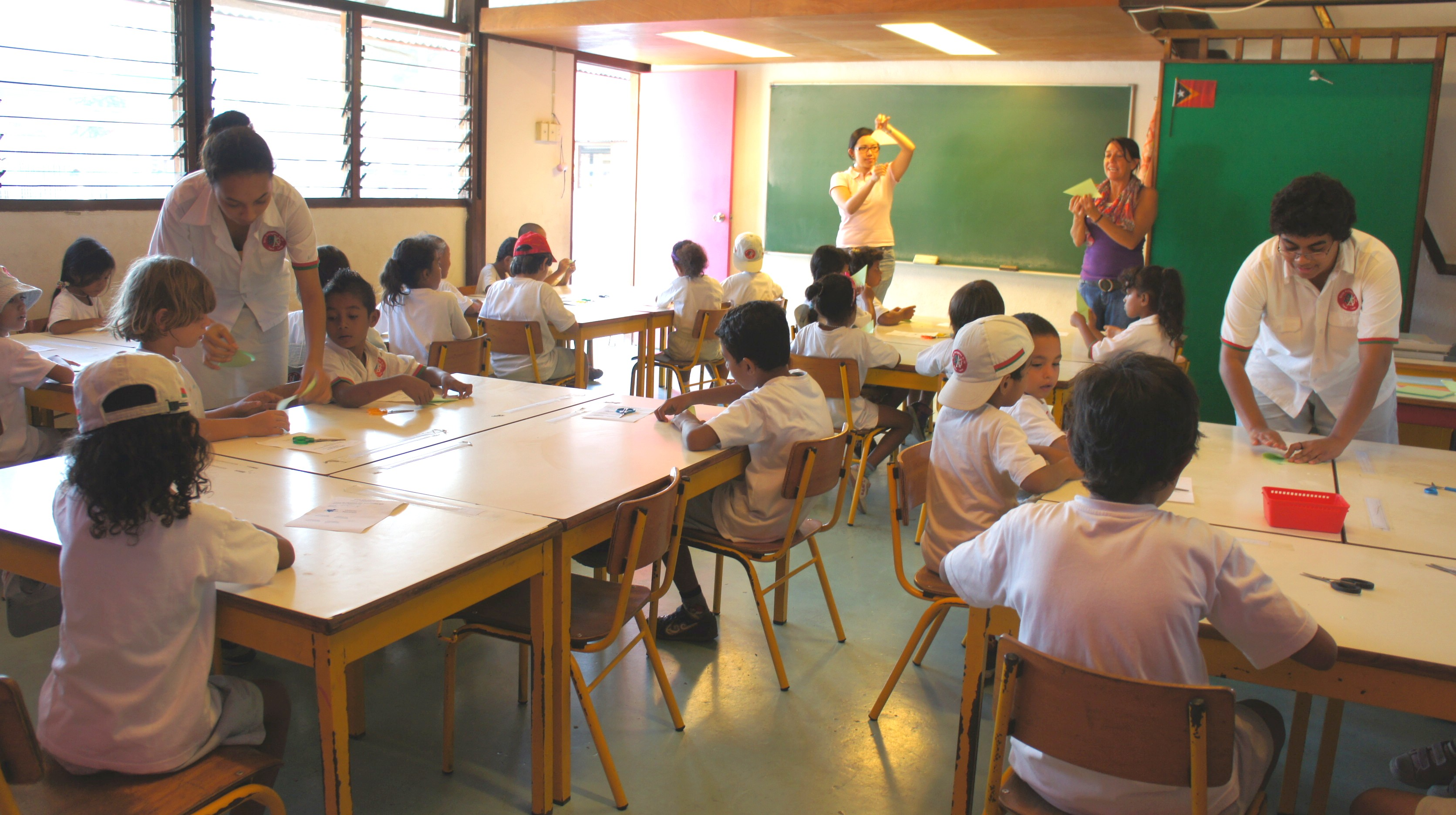
Escola Portuguesa Ruy Cinatti, the Portuguese School of Díli

Timor-Leste's adult literacy rate was 68% among adults, and 84% among those aged 15–24, as of 2021. It is slightly higher among women than men. More girls than boys attend school, although some drop out upon reaching puberty. As of 2016 22% of working age women (15–49) and 19% of working age men had no education, 15% of women and 18% of men had some primary education, 52% of women and 51% of men had some secondary education, and 11% of women and 12% of men had higher education. Overall, 75% of women and 82% of men were literate. Primary schools exist throughout the country, although the quality of materials and teaching is often poor. Secondary schools are generally limited to municipal capitals. Education takes up 10% of the national budget. The country's main university is the National University of Timor-Leste. There are also four colleges.

Since independence, both Indonesian and Tetun have lost ground as media of instruction, while Portuguese has increased: in 2001 only 8.4% of primary school and 6.8% of secondary school students attended a Portuguese-medium school; by 2005 this had increased to 81.6% for primary and 46.3% for secondary schools. Indonesian formerly played a considerable role in education, being used by 73.7% of all secondary school students as a medium of instruction, but by 2005 Portuguese was used by most schools in Baucau, Manatuto, as well as the capital district. Portugal provides support to about 3% of the public schools in Timor-Leste, focused on those in urban areas, further encouraging the use of the Portuguese language.

== Culture ==
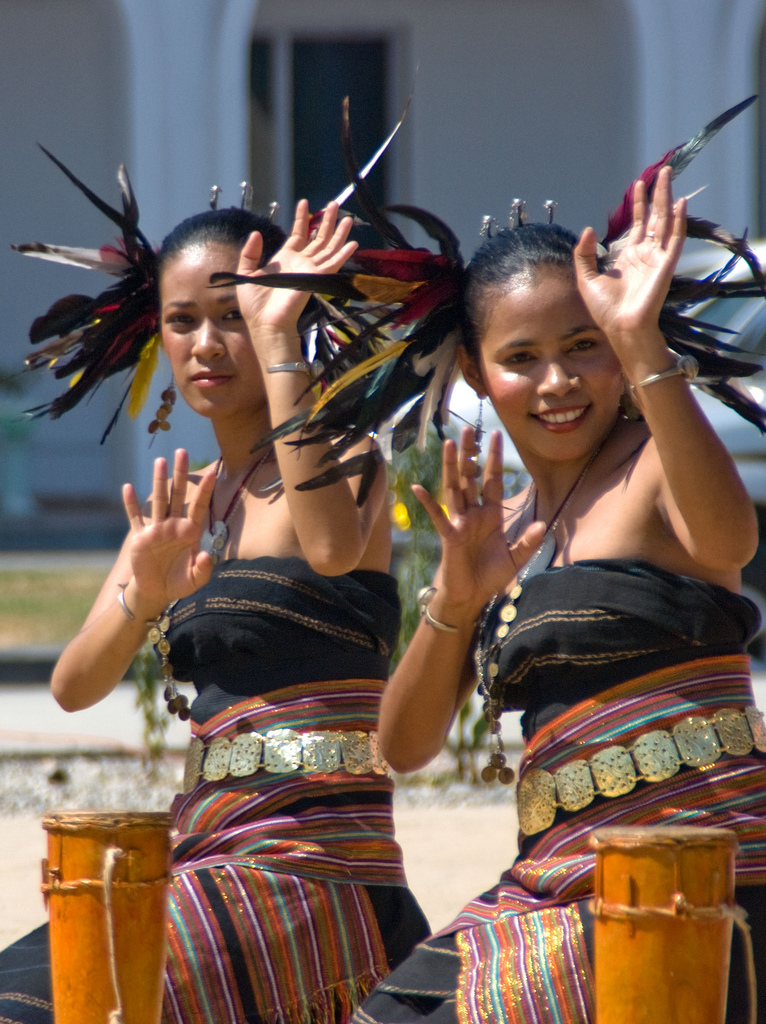
Traditional Timorese dancers

The culture of Timor-Leste stem from several waves of Austronesian and Melanesian migration that led to the current population, with unique identities and traditions developing within each petty kingdom. Portuguese authorities built upon traditional structures, blending Portuguese influence into the existing political and social systems. The presence of the Catholic Church created a point of commonality across the various ethnic groups, despite full conversion remaining limited. The Portuguese language also provided common linkages, even if direct Portuguese impact was limited. Under Indonesian rule, resistance strengthened cultural links to Catholicism and the Portuguese language. At the same time, Indonesian cultural influence was spread through schools and administration.

The preservation of traditional beliefs in the face of Indonesian attempts to suppress them became linked to the creation of the country's national identity. This national identity only began to emerge at the very end of Portuguese rule, and further developed during Indonesian rule. Following independence, a civic identity began to develop. This was most clearly expressed through enthusiasm for national-level democracy, and was reflected in politics through a shift from resistance narratives to development ones. The capital has developed a more cosmopolitan culture, while rural areas maintain stronger traditional practices. Internal migration into urban areas, especially Dili, creates cultural links between these areas and rural hinterlands. Those in urban areas often continue to identify with a specific rural area, even those with multiple generations born in Dili.

The presence of so many ethnic and linguistic groups means cultural practices vary across the country. These practices reflect historical social structures and practices, where political leaders were regarded as having spiritual powers. Ancestry was an important part of cultural practices, and partly signified leadership. Leaders often had influence over land use, and these leaders continue to play an informal role in land disputes and other aspects of community practice today. An important traditional concept is lulik, or sacredness. Some lulik ceremonies continue to reflect animist beliefs, for example through divination ceremonies which vary throughout the country. Sacred status can also be associated with objects, such as Portuguese flags which have been passed down within families.

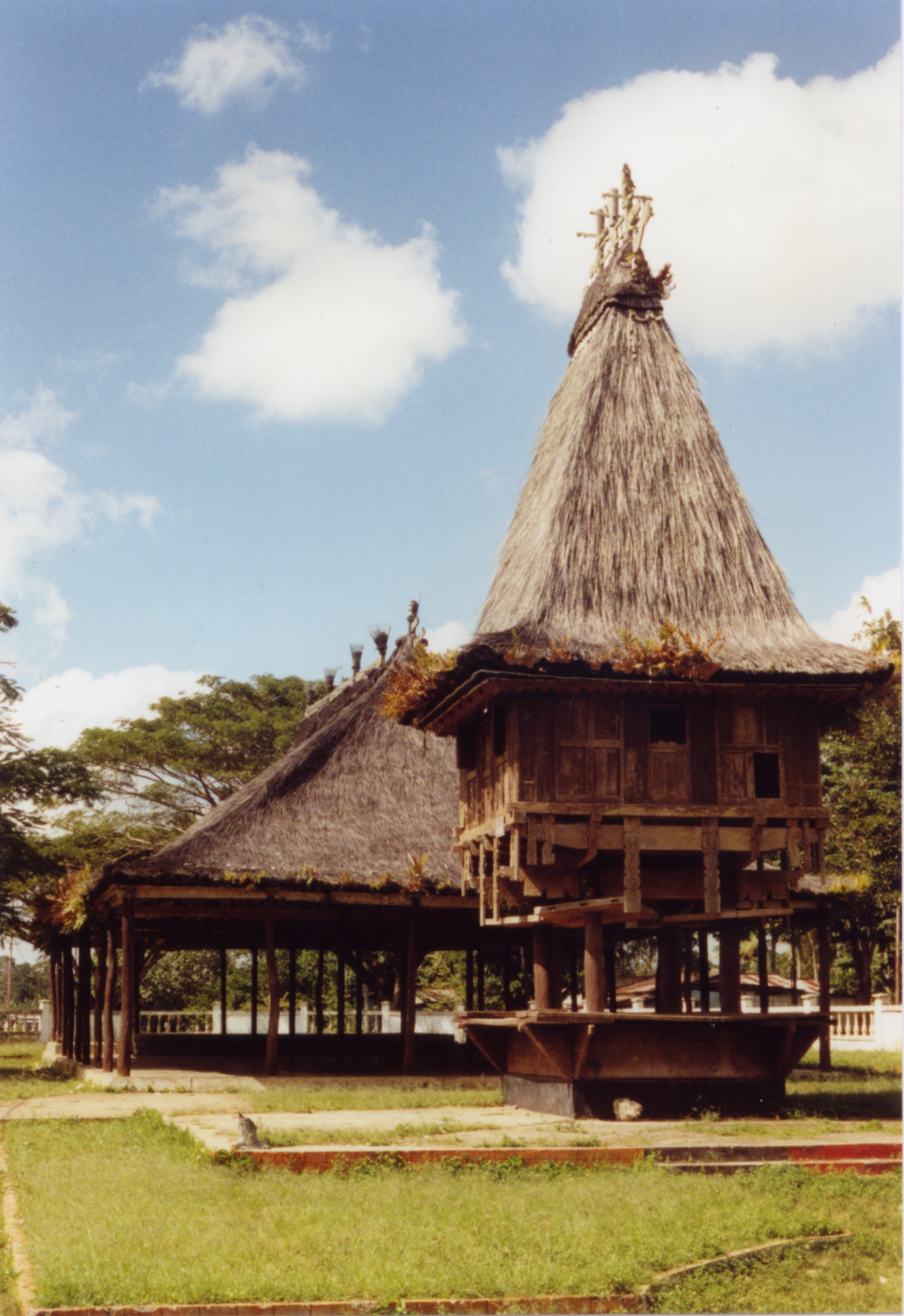
Sacred house (lee teinu) in Lospalos

Community life is centred around sacred houses (Uma Lulik), physical structures which serve as a representative symbol and identifier for each community. The architectural style of these houses varies between different parts of the country, although following widespread destruction by Indonesian forces many were rebuilt with cheap modern materials. The house as a concept extends beyond the physical object to the surrounding community. Kinship systems exist within and between houses. Traditional leaders, who stem from historically important families, retain key roles in administering justice and resolving disputes through methods that vary between communities. Such leaders are often elected to official leadership positions, merging cultural and historical status with modern political status. The concept of being part of a communal house has been extended to the nation, with Parliament serving as the national sacred house.

Art styles vary throughout the various ethnolinguistic groups of the island. Nonetheless, similar artistic motifs are present throughout, such as large animals and particular geometric patterns. Some art is traditionally associated with particular genders. For example, the Tais textiles that play a widespread role in traditional life throughout the island are traditionally handwoven by women. Different tais patterns are associated with different communities, and more broadly with linguistic groups. Many buildings within central Dili maintain historical Portuguese architecture.

Traditional rituals remain important, often mixed in with more modern aspects. A strong oral history is highlighted in individuals able to recite long stories or poetry. This history, or Lia nain, passes down traditional knowledge. There remains a strong tradition of poetry. Prime Minister Xanana Gusmão, for example, is a distinguished poet, earning the moniker "poet warrior".

In the field of cinema, Timor-Leste released its first feature-length film, a period thriller titled Beatriz's War, in 2013. Shot with a limited budget by a mix of local filmmakers and a volunteer Australian film crew, the film depicted East Timorese life under Indonesian occupation in the 1970s, with producer Lurdes Pires acknowledging their aim to diverge from the government's "friendship and forgiveness" policy for its past conflicts by telling a story of truth-seeking and justice.

=== Media ===
Newspapers are concentrated in Dili, and they are mostly published in the national Tetun language. Television stations are also concentrated in Dili, with only one Dili-based station available outside the city. Radio is the most popular form of mass media, due to various reasons, such as a low literacy rate, the cost of newspapers relative to the average income, and it being broadcast in regional languages. Press freedom is mixed. As of 2022, 37% of the country were Internet users.

== See also ==
- Outline of Timor-Leste
- List of Timor-Leste–related topics

== Bibliography ==
- Cashmore, Ellis (1988). Dictionary of Race and Ethnic Relations. New York: Routledge. ASIN B000NPHGX6.
- Charny, Israel W., ed. (1999). Encyclopedia of Genocide. Vol. 1. Santa Barbara, California: ABC-Clio. ISBN 0-87436-928-2.
- Dunn, James (1996). East Timor: A People Betrayed. Sydney: Australian Broadcasting Corporation.
- Durand, Frédéric (2006). East Timor: A Country at the Crossroads of Asia and the Pacific, a Geo-Historical Atlas. Chiang Mai: Silkworm Books. ISBN 9749575989.
- Durand, Frédéric (2016). History of Timor Leste. Chiang Mai: Silkworm Books. ISBN 978-616-215-124-8.
- Groshong, Daniel J (2006). Timor-Leste: Land of Discovery. Hong Kong: Tayo Photo Group. ISBN 988987640X.
- Gunn, Geoffrey C. (1999). Timor Loro Sae: 500 Years. Macau: Livros do Oriente. ISBN 972-9418-69-1.
- Gunn, Geoffrey C (2011). Historical Dictionary of East Timor. Lanham, Maryland: Scarecrow Press. ISBN 9780810867543.
- Hägerdal, Hans (2012). Lords of the land, lords of the sea; Conflict and adaptation in early colonial Timor, 1600-1800. Leiden: KITLV Press. doi:10.26530/oapen_408241. hdl:20.500.12657/34566. ISBN 978-90-6718-378-9 – via Oapen.
- Kingsbury, Damien; Leach, Michael (2007). East Timor: Beyond Independence. Monash Papers on Southeast Asia, no 65. Clayton, Vic: Monash University Press. ISBN 9781876924492.
- Hill, H; Saldanha, J, eds. (2002). East Timor: Development Challenges for the World's Newest Nation. London: Palgrave Macmillan UK. ISBN 978-0-333-98716-2.
- Leach, Michael; Kingsbury, Damien, eds. (2013). The Politics of Timor-Leste: Democratic Consolidation After Intervention. Studies on Southeast Asia, no 59. Ithaca, NY: Cornell University, Southeast Asia Program Publications. ISBN 9780877277897.
- Levinson, David (1998). Ethnic Relations: A Cross-Cultural Encyclopedia. Santa Barbara, California: ABC-Clio.
- Molnar, Andrea Katalin (2010). Timor Leste: Politics, History, and Culture. Routledge Contemporary Southeast Asia series, 27. London; New York: Routledge. ISBN 9780415778862.
- Rudolph, Joseph R., ed. (2003). Encyclopedia of Modern Ethnic Conflicts. Westport, Connecticut: Greenwood Press. pp. 101–106. ISBN 0-313-01574-0.
- Shelton, Dinah L., ed. (2005). Encyclopedia of Genocide and Crimes Against Humanity. Detroit: Thomson Gale. SSRN 2226008.
- Taylor, John G. (1999). East Timor: The Price of Freedom. Annandale: Pluto Press. ISBN 978-1-85649-840-1.
- Viegas, Susana de Matos; Feijó, Rui Graça, eds. (2017). Transformations in Independent Timor-Leste: Dynamics of Social and Cultural Cohabitations. London: Routledge. ISBN 9781315534992.
- Berlie, Jean A. (2001). East Timor: A Bibliography. Paris: Indes savantes. ISBN 2-84654-012-8., a bibliographic reference, launched by PM Xanana Gusmão
- East Timor, politics and elections (in Chinese)/ 东帝汶政治与选举 (2001–2006): 国家建设及前景展望, Jean A. Berlie, Institute of Southeast Asian Studies of Jinan University editor, Jinan, China, published in 2007.
- Lundahl, Mats; Sjöholm, Fredrik (2019). The Creation of the East Timorese Economy. Vol. 1–2. Cham: Springer.
