= Kawaimina languages =

Four languages or dialects of Timor-Leste

Kawaimina
- Geographic distribution: Timor-Leste
- Ethnicity: Kawaimina people
- Linguistic classification: Austronesian: Malayo-Polynesian; Central–Eastern; Timoric; Extra-Ramelaic; Eastern Extra-Ramelaic; Kawaimina

Language codes
- Glottolog: kawa1289

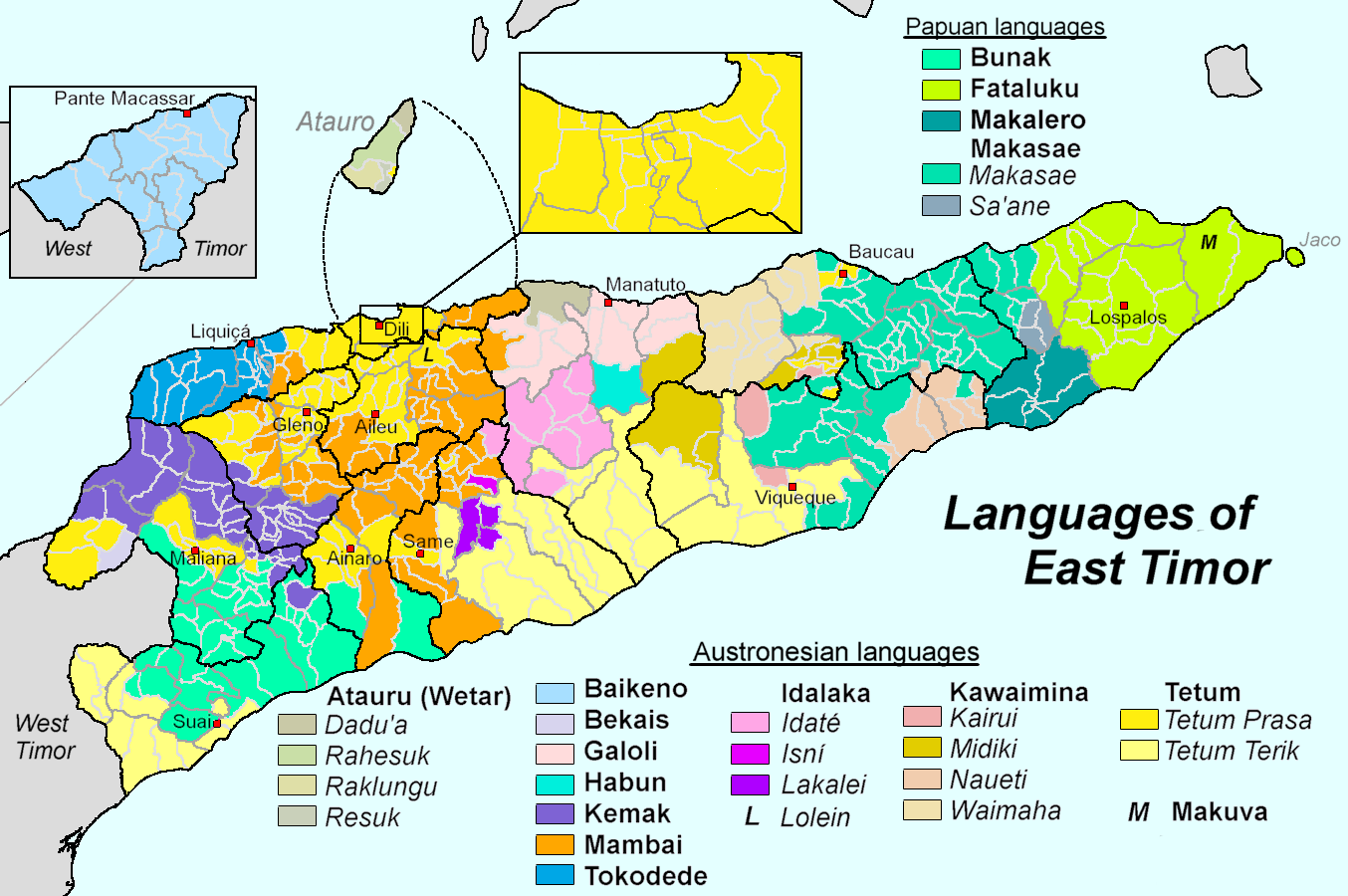
Languages in Timor-Leste

Kawaimina (a syllabic abbreviation of the names) is a cluster of four languages and dialects of Timor-Leste:Kairui, Midiki, Waimaha, and Naueti, spoken by one or two thousand speakers each. It is a name used by linguists discussing the languages, not the speakers themselves. The first three are spoken in adjacent areas in the western part of Baucau District, along the north coast. Naueti is used on the south coast of eastern Viqueque District, surrounded by speakers of Makasae and Makalero. Some Midiki speakers near Ossu refer to their language as Osomoko.

== Classification ==
Geoffrey Hull classifies these as dialects and groups them into a single Kawaimina language, while Ethnologue groups the varieties into three distinct languages.

The Kawaimina languages are members of the eastern Extra-Ramelaic subgroup of Timoric Austronesian languages. While structurally the languages are Malayo-Polynesian, much their vocabulary, particularly that of Naueti, derives from Papuan languages. The languages are noted for both archaisms and unusual innovations, including vowel harmony and aspirated and glottalized consonants in their sound-systems.

== Gallery ==
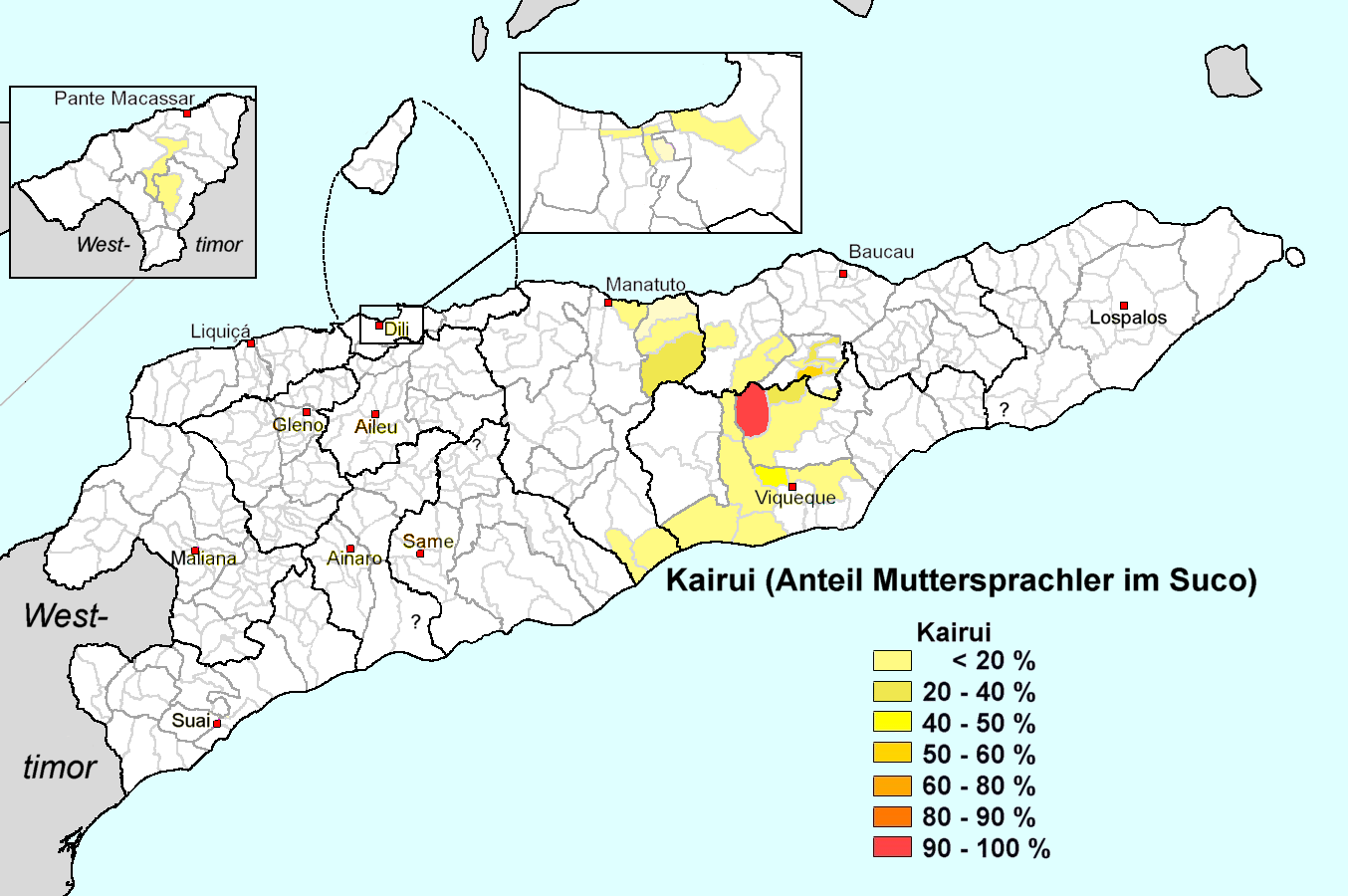
Kairui

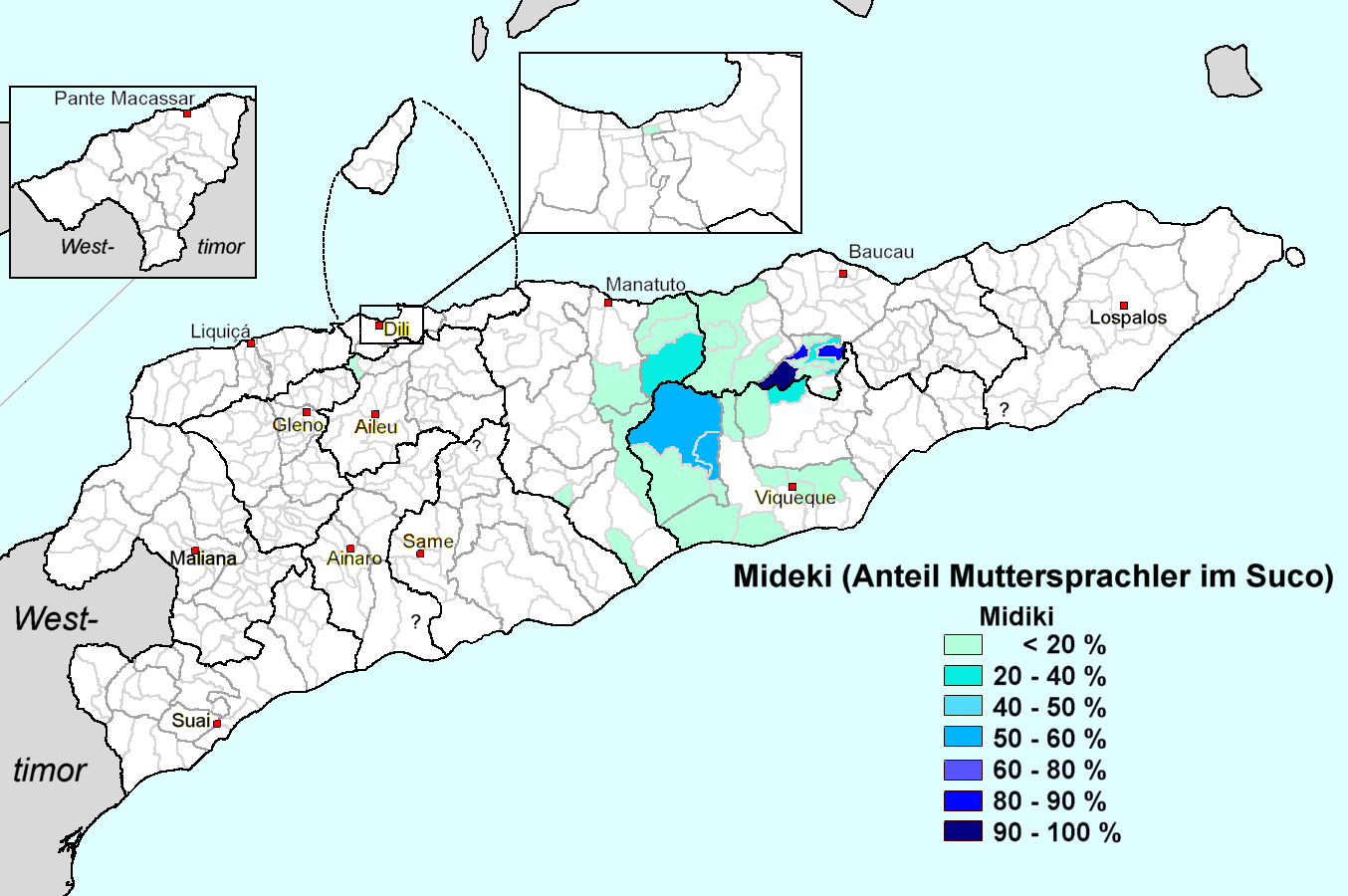
Midiki

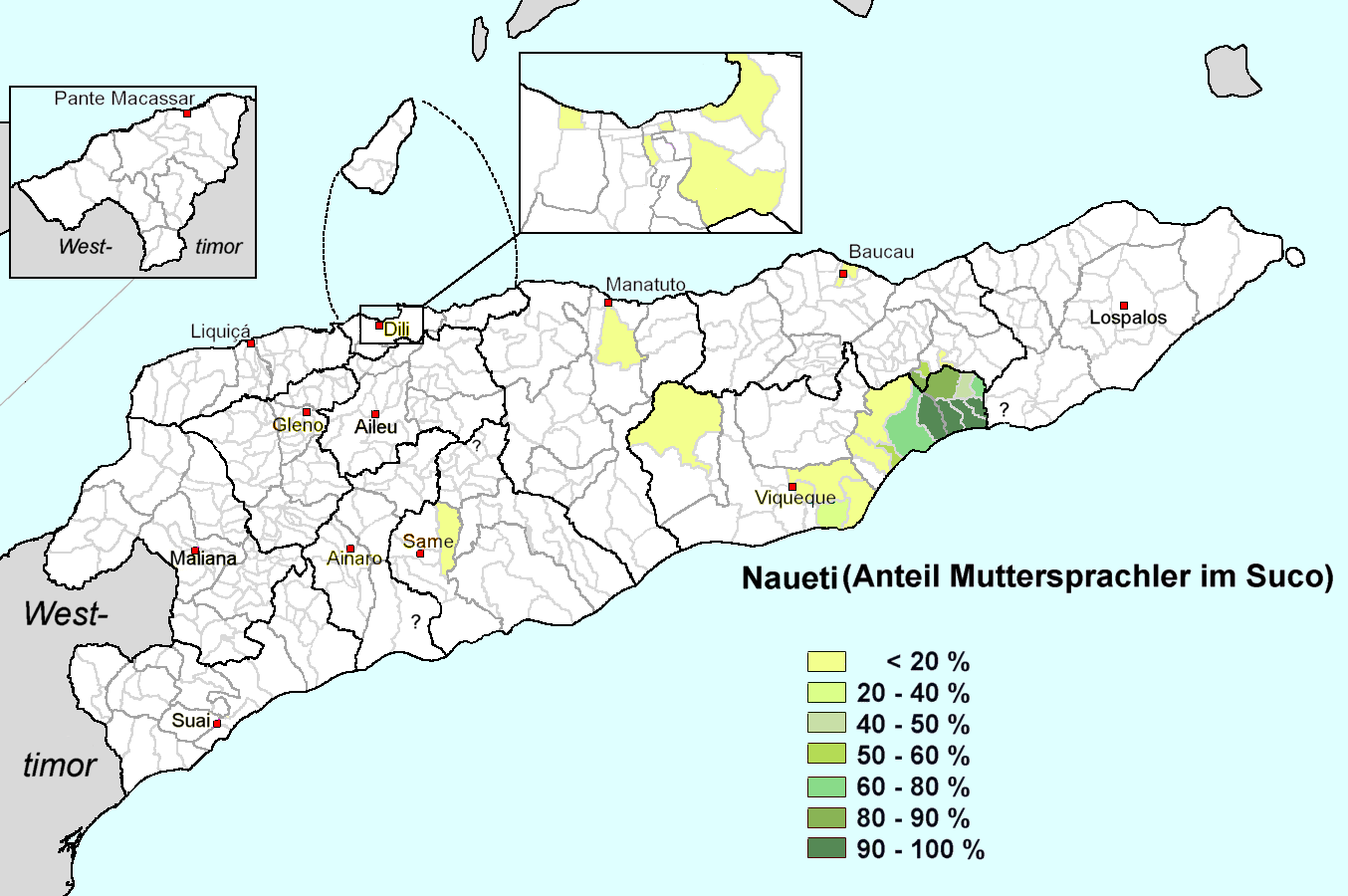
Naueti

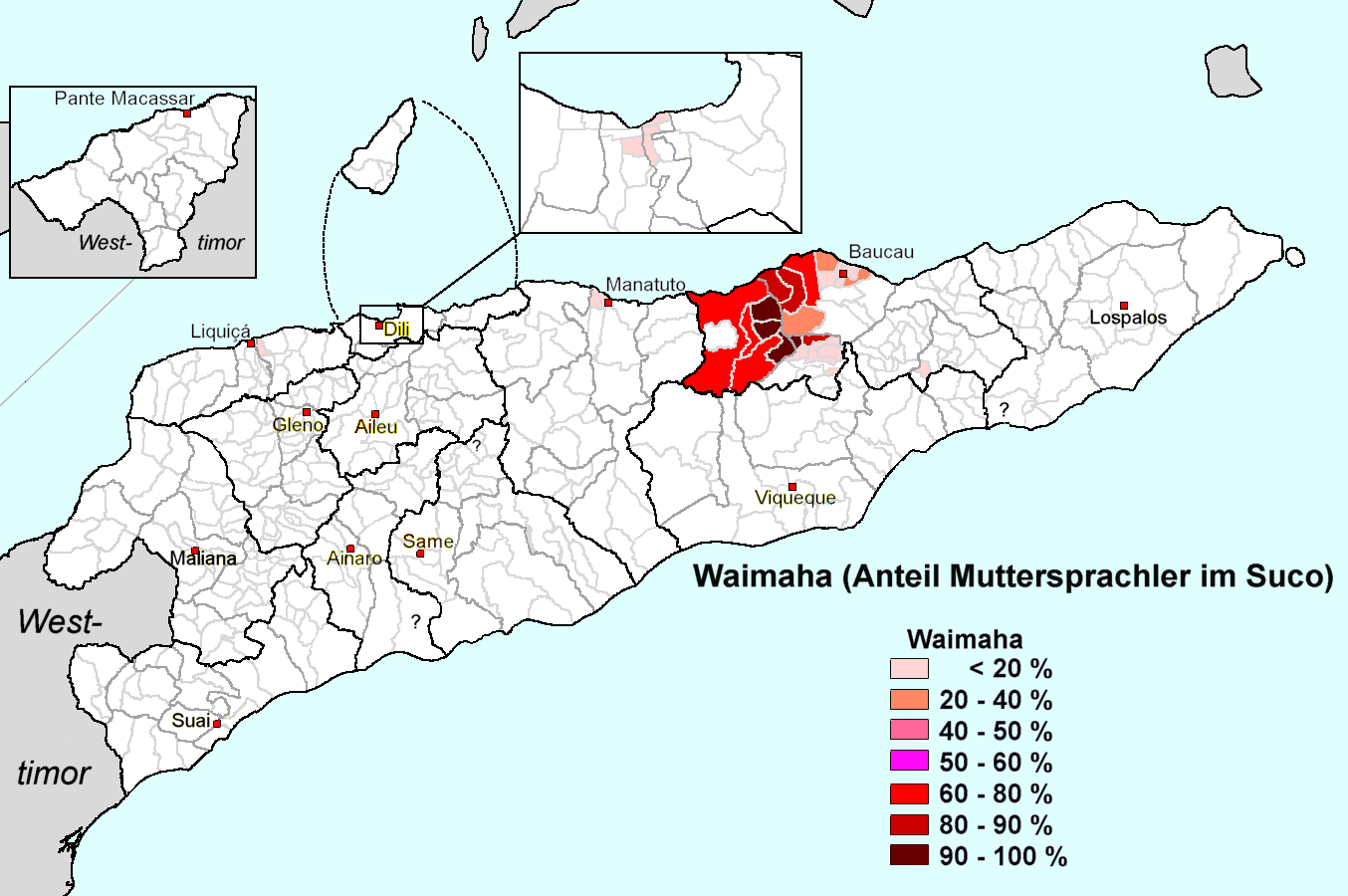
Waimaha
