= Telephone numbers in Timor-Leste =

- Country: Timor-Leste
- Continent: Asia
- Numbering plan type: closed
- Country code: 670
- International access: 00
- Long-distance: none

Until September 1999, East Timor (now Timor-Leste) formed part of the Indonesian numbering plan, using the country code 62, followed by area codes for the two largest cities, Dili (390) and Baucau (399). Following the violence in the wake of Indonesia's departure from the territory, most of the telecommunications infrastructure was destroyed, and Telkom Indonesia withdrew its services from East Timor.

In the interim, the code 672, used by the Australian External Territories, was used to reach numbers in the territory. Originally, the 672 code had been allocated to the then Portuguese Timor, before its invasion and occupation in 1975.

A new country code, 670, was allocated to East Timor, but international access often remained severely limited. A complicating factor is that 670 was previously used by the Northern Marianas, with many carriers not aware that the code is now used by Timor-Leste, and that the Northern Marianas, now part of the North American Numbering Plan, use the code 1 and the area code 670.

Calls to the Northern Marianas from the US are billed as calls to Timor-Leste.

Timor-Leste now has a closed numbering plan; all fixed line subscribers' numbers are seven digits, while mobile phone subscribers' numbers are now eight digits, with a '7' being added to the old seven-digit number.

Telephone numbering in Timor-Leste is as follows:

Number format with area code	Area
Western Region
21X XXXX	Manufahi
22X XXXX	Cova Lima
23X XXXX	Bobonaro
24X XXXX	Ainaro
25X XXXX	Oecusse
Central Region
31X XXXX	Dili (reserve)
32X XXXX	Dili (reserve)
33X XXXX	Dili (initial)
36X XXXX	Liquiçá
37X XXXX	Aileu
38X XXXX	Ermera
Eastern Region
41X XXXX	Baucau
42X XXXX	Manatuto
43X XXXX	Viqueque
44X XXXX	Lautém

- Mobile: 73xx-xxxx ~ 78xx-xxxx
- Service numbers: 721-XXXX
- Government departments: 333-YYYY
- Ambulance service: 110
- Fire Dept: 115
- Emergency: 112
