= Kairui-Midiki language =

Language spoken in East Timor

Kairui-Midiki
- Region: Northeast East Timor
- Native speakers: 18,600: 14,600 Midiki and 4,000 Kairui (2015 census)
- Language family: Austronesian: Malayo-Polynesian; Central–Eastern; Timoric; Kawaimina; Kairui-Midiki

Language codes
- ISO 639-3: krd
- Glottolog: kair1265
- ELP: Kairui-Midiki; Kairui-Midiki
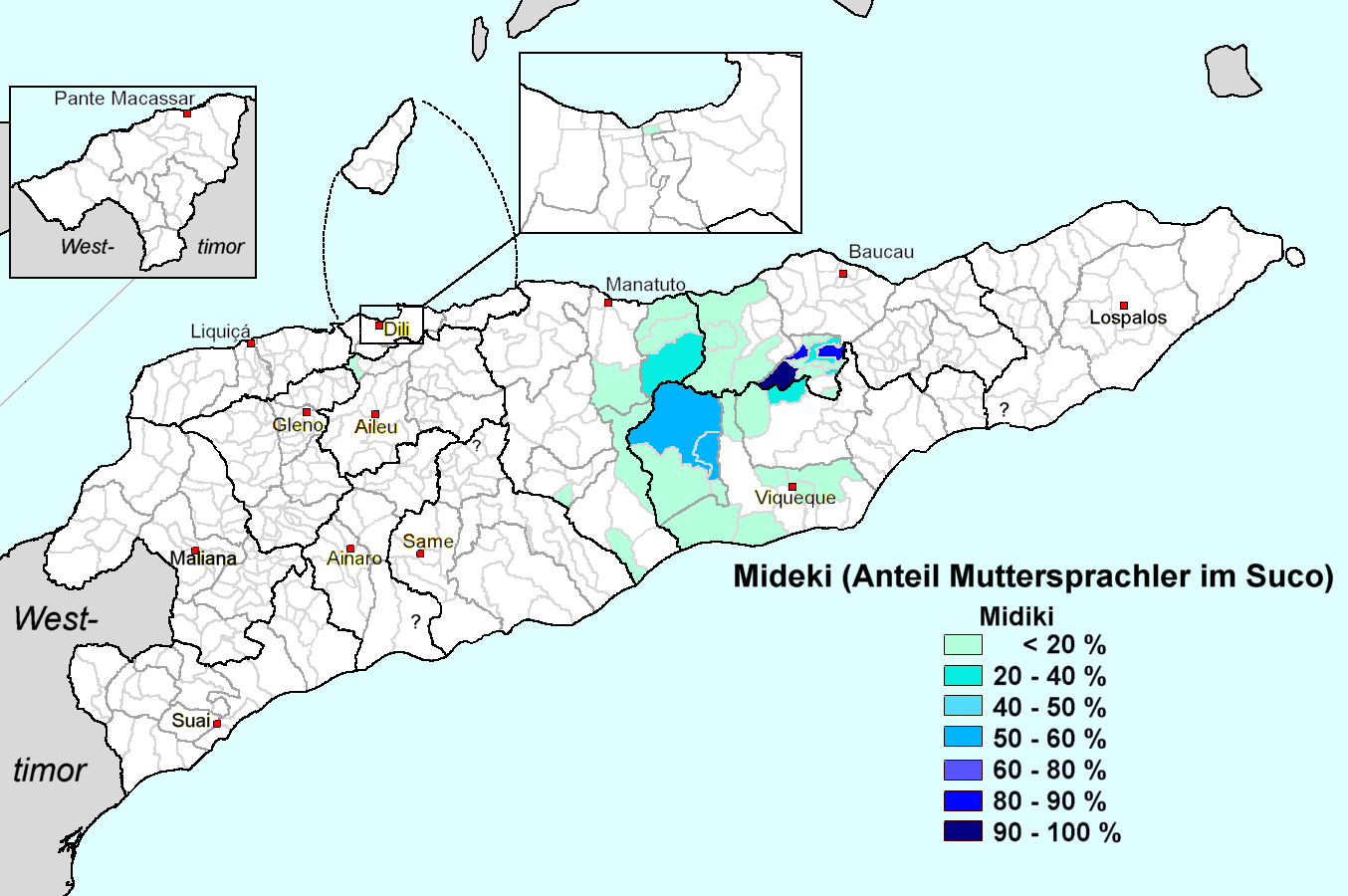
- Distribution of Midiki

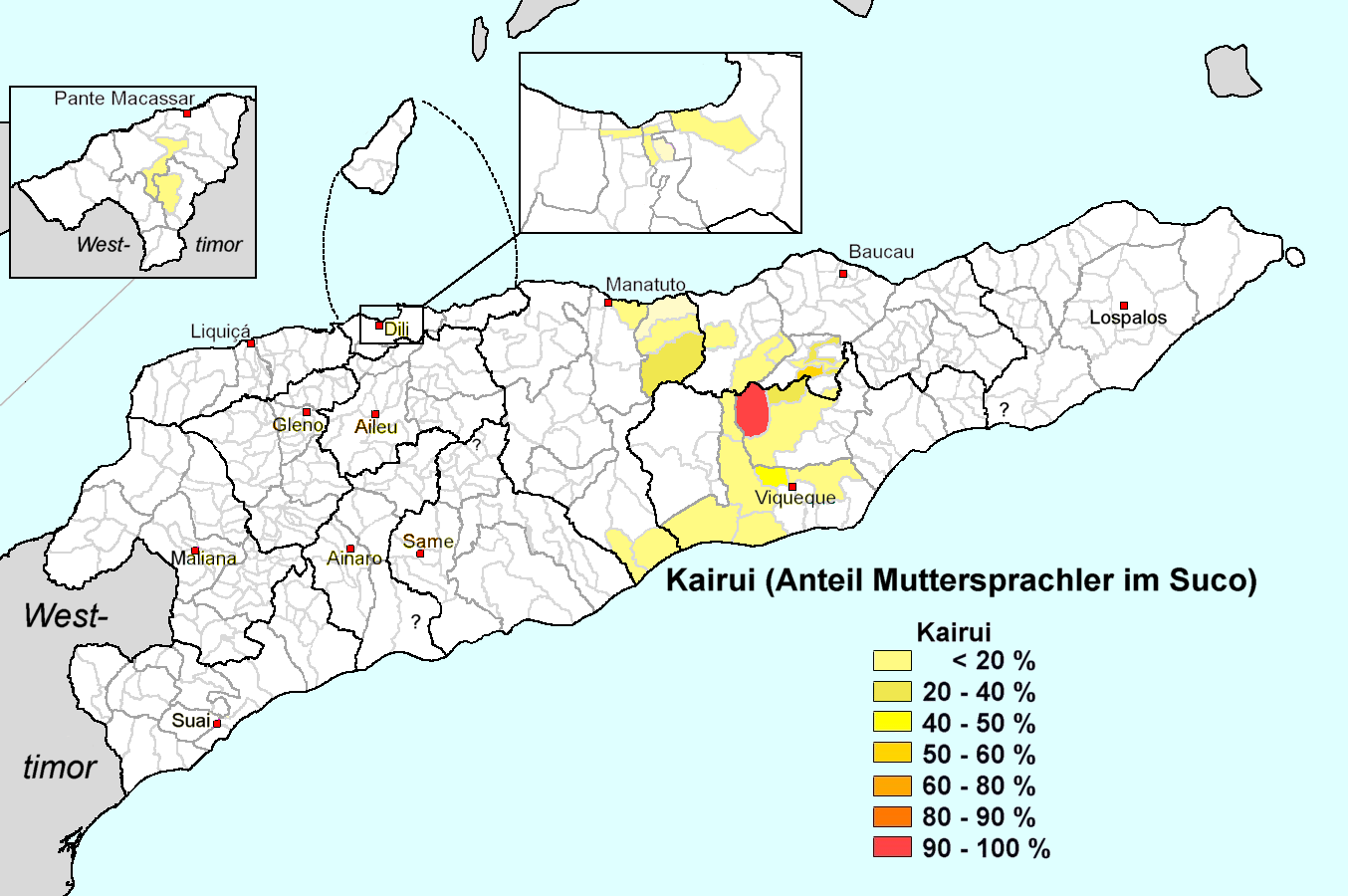
- Distribution of Kairui

Kairui-Midiki (also known simply as Midiki or Kairui, or Hoso by its speakers) is a language of East Timor spoken by 18,600 people in 2015, primarily in Venilale Administrative Post in Baucau, parts of the Viqueque Municipality, and suco Kairui (Manatuto Municipality).

Kairui-Midiki is closely related to the Waima'a and Naueti languages. These four varieties' level of mutual intelligibility has led some to categorize them as dialects of a single language: Kawaimina.

Kairui and Midiki were listed separately in the Timor-Leste 2010 Census, but are often considered dialects of a single language, in the literature named Kairui-Midiki. According to some sources Kairui is spoken in and around the village of that name in Manatuto, and Midiki is heard in of Lacluta, Liaruca, Uai-Mori, and Venilale. However in some districts the names Midiki and Kairui are used interchangeably.
