= Damien Kingsbury =

Australian academic and journalist

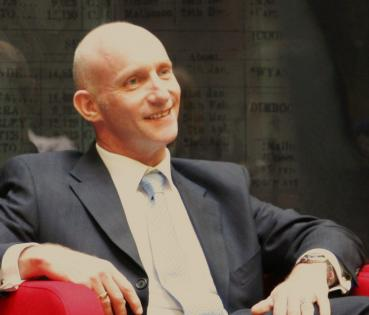
- Professor Damien Kingsbury at Waterfront Campus in 2011
- Born: 30 August 1955 (age 71)
- Education: Monash University; Columbia University
- Scientific career
- Workplaces: Deakin University

Damien Kingsbury, is an Australian academic specializing in political and security issues.

== Education ==
Kingsbury studied Journalism and Politics at the Royal Melbourne Institute of Technology. In 1983, he was awarded the Australian News Correspondents Memorial Award as the Tony Joyce Scholar for his journalism from El Salvador, to undertake an MS in Journalism at Columbia University, New York. In 1989, Kingsbury completed an MA in Development Studies at Monash University in 1991. In 1997 he graduated with a PhD at Monash University.

== Career ==
=== Journalism ===
In 1979-80 Kingsbury was a journalist for Australian Associated Press. In 1981 he wrote articles on the civil war in El Salvador, published in The Age, The Sydney Morning Herald and the (London) Observer. Kingsbury took up a staff position with The Age in mid-1981.

In 1985, Kingsbury joined the Australian Broadcasting Corporation's Radio News Division, then Radio Australia. While at Radio Australia, Kingsbury was awarded the Australian ASEAN Journalists Program in 1988. Kingsbury has since contributed to a number of media outlets, including as 'World' commentator for ABC Melbourne until 2020 and, until 2019, as international affairs commentator for Crikey and, since 2020, as weekly international affairs commentator for ABC Victoria. He is regularly quoted by Australian and international media on regional political affairs.

=== Academia ===
Kingsbury lectured in Journalism at Deakin University (1989-1991), leaving to complete his PhD studies. He returned to Monash University in 1998 as Coordinator of the MA in Asian Studies and Lecturer in Development Studies. In 1999, Kingsbury led the Australia East Timor International Volunteer Program monitoring mission to Timor-Leste's 'popular consultation' for independence.

In 2001, Kingsbury joined Deakin University as a Senior Lecturer in International and Community Development. While with Deakin, in 2005 Kingsbury was adviser to the Free Aceh Movement in the Helsinki peace talks, ending three decades of conflict in the western Indonesian province of Aceh. The mediator of these peace talks, former Finnish President Martti Ahtisaari, was awarded a Nobel Peace Prize in October 2008, 'for his efforts on several continents and over more than three decades', including playing a prominent role in resolving many conflicts in Namibia, Aceh, Indonesia; Kosovo and Iraq, among other areas'. Kingsbury also advised on conflict resolution to the Liberation Tigers of Tamil Eelam, the West Papua Coalition for National Liberation, on separatist internecine conflict in Nagaland (India) and with the Moro Islamic Liberation Front.

In 2006 Kingsbury was promoted to Associate Professor and in 2010 appointed to a Personal Chair as Professor. While at Deakin University, Kingsbury coordinated election observer missions to Timor-Leste in 2007, 2012, 2017 and 2018. In 2014 Kingsbury returned to El Salvador to research the publication Gold, Water and the Struggle for Basic Rights in El Salvador (Oxfam Australia, 14 September 2014) which contributed to the International Center for Settlement of Investment Disputes dismissing a claim by Pac Rim Cayman LLC against El Salvador in regard to its freedom to mine under the North America Free Trade Agreement (NAFTA), being the first time the NAFTA provisions had been defeated in court.

In 2015, Kingsbury was named Professor of International Politics and in November of the same year he coordinated election observers to Myanmar's general elections. From 2014 to 2015 Kingsbury worked as a columnist for The Guardian. He retired from Deakin University at the end of 2020 and was made Professor Emeritus of the university in July 2021.

== Books ==
Kingsbury is the author or editor of:

- 2022 The Rise and Decline of Modern Democracy Routledge, London.
- 2022 ed. with Iron, R. How Wars End: Theory and Practice Routledge, London.
- 2021 Separatism and the State Routledge, London. 2P 2022.
- 2019 Politics in Developing Countries Routledge, London.
- 2016 Politics in Contemporary Southeast Asia: Authority, Democracy and Political Change Routledge, London.
- 2015 ed. with Laoutides, C. Territorial Separatism in World Politics: Causes, Outcomes and Resolution, Routledge, London.
- 2014. ed. An Australian Head of State: One of Us: Essays on an Australian Republic, Hardie Grant, Melbourne.
- 2013. ed. Critical Reflections on Development Palgrave, London.
- 2013. ed. with Leach, M. The Politics of Timor-Leste Cornell University Press, Ithaca, NY.
- 2011. Sri Lanka and the Responsibility to Protect: Politics, Ethnicity and Genocide Routledge, London.
- 2009 East Timor: The Price of Liberty Palgrave-Macmillan, New York.
- 2008 International Development: Issues and Challenges Palgrave-Macmillan, London and New York. Co-ordinating author, with McGillivray, M., McKay, J, and Hunt, J, and Clarke, M. 2E 2012, 3E 2016, 4E 2026.
- 2008. ed. with Avonius, L. Asian Values and Human Rights Revisited Palgrave-Macmillan, New York.
- 2007 Political Development Routledge, London and New York, pb/hb.
- 2007 East Timor: Beyond Independence. Ed. with Leach, M. Monash Asia Institute Press/Institute for Southeast Asian Studies, Melbourne/Singapore.
- 2006 Peace in Aceh: A Personal Account of the Aceh Peace Process Equinox, Jakarta and Singapore.
- 2005 ed. Violence in Between: security issues in archipelagic South-East Asia, Monash Asia Institute Press/Institute for Southeast Asian Studies, Melbourne/Singapore.
- 2004: Key Issues in Development Palgrave-Macmillan, London and New York. Co-ordinating author, with Remenyi, J. McKay, J, and Hunt, J.
- 2003 Power Politics and the Indonesian Military Routledge-Curzon, London.
- 2002 ed. with Aveling, H. Autonomy and Disintegration in Indonesia, Routledge-Curzon, London. paperback edition March 2004.
- 2001. South East Asia: A Political Profile Oxford University Press, Melbourne. Reprint May 2002, May 2003, May 2004. 2E 2005.
- 2001 ed. with Budiman, A. Indonesia: The Uncertain Transition Crawford House Publishing, Adelaide.
- 2000. ed. The Presidency of Abdurrahman Wahid: An Assessment After the First Year Annual Indonesian Lecture Series, No 23, Monash Asia Institute, Monash University, Melbourne.
- 2000 ed. Guns and Ballot Boxes: East Timor’s vote for Independence Monash' Asia Institute, Melbourne.
- 1999 Reformasi: Crisis and Change in Indonesia Centre for Southeast Asian Studies, Monash University. Ed. with Budiman, A. and Hatley, B.
- 1999 Foreign Devils: The News Media in South East Asia Centre for Southeast Asian Studies, Monash University. Melbourne. Ed. with Loo, E and Payne, P.
- 1998 The Politics of Indonesia Oxford University Press, Melbourne. Reprint September 1998. 2E 2002, 3E 2005.
- 1994 Difference and Tolerance: Human Rights Issues in Southeast Asia Deakin University Press, Geelong. Ed. with Barton, G.

== Background ==
Kingsbury was married to Rae Kingsbury, A.M. (3 July 1957 - 9 December 2025), former Honorary Consul for Timor-Leste in Victoria 2012–2018, and is father of two children, Alexandra and Cailan. From 2010, he was Vice-President/Deputy Chair of the Balibo House Trust until late 2024 and remains a board member 4. He is formerly a Director on the Board of the East Timor Hearts Fund and also a founding Board member of the Australia Myanmar Institute.
