= Jean Berlie =

French socio-anthropologist

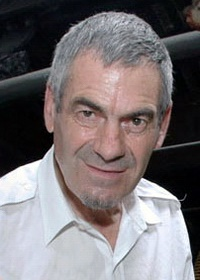
- Berlie in January 2010
- Born: 1936 (age 89–90); Misahohé, Palimé, Togo
- Other names: 韓林; Hanlin; Komlan; Johan Berlie; Jean A. Berlie
- Education: EHESS; Nice University; Paris University; Ecole d'Hydrographie
- Known for: Scholar in anthropology
- Awards: Légion d'honneur

Jean Berlie (also named Jean A. Berlie, Johan Berlie, Komlan in African Ewe, or 韓林, Hanlin in Chinese) is a French socio-anthropologist specialising in Asia and China.

== Background ==
Berlie was born in Misahohé, near Kpalimé, Togo in 1936, from a family of French colonial administrators.

He was in the French merchant navy until 1960 when he joined the French Navy as a Fusilier Marin, where he later became a Naval Aviation pilot, then Capitaine de Corvette. In 1969 he became an airline pilot, working with Dassault, Balair, Air Inter, and Air France.

He has visited more than 100 countries in Asia, Pacific, Africa, Europe, Americas, India, and most provinces of China, both in his earlier careers, and for his anthropologist studies. He speaks more than 15 languages.

Berlie has been awarded with the French Légion d'honneur.

== Academic career ==
During his pilot career, Berlie studied anthropology under the supervision of Lucien Bernot and Georges Condominas, famous French anthropologists. He was also a visiting scholar at Oxford University in 1996.

Berlie was awarded with a PhD in anthropology at École des hautes études en sciences sociales (EHESS), Paris University (France) in 1985, and with a PhD in anthropology at Nice University (France) in 1997.

- Honorary Research Fellow at the Center for Greater China Studies (CGCS) of The Hong Kong Institute of Education, Hong Kong, since 2012.
- Former board member at the American Journal of Asian Studies (USA).
- Board member at the Tai Culture Review, Berlin (Germany), since 1995.
- Researcher at the Centre of Asian Studies of the University of Hong Kong, Hong Kong, since 1991.
- Former Vice President of The French Association of Research on South-East Asian Studies (AFRASE), Paris (France), from 1989 to 1994.

== Scholarly societies ==
- Life member of the Royal Asiatic Society, Hong Kong .
- Member of the Asiatic Society (Société Asiatique), Paris (France).
- Life member of the Assam Research Society (Kamarupa Anusandhan Samiti), Guwahati, Assam (India).
- Life member of the International Association of French Speaking Sociologists (Association internationale des sociologues de langue française - AISLF), Toulouse (France).

== Scholarships ==
=== Lingnan University ===
Teaching South-East Asian political science in 1992 at the Lingnan University, Hong Kong (China).

=== Cultural Institute of Macau ===
Scholarship at the Cultural Institute of Macau, from 1995 to 2000 in Macau (China). A study of the Chinese of Macau and the Macanese. In July 2009 a conference was presented on this subject at the Albergue Foundation, Casa de Misericordia, in Macau.

=== International Institute for Asian Studies ===
Scholarship at the Leiden University "International Institute for Asian Studies (IIAS)" of Leiden (the Netherlands) in 2006. A public lecture was presented in Leiden on the Rohingya of Arakan.

=== Jinan University ===
Visiting professor at the Institute of South-East Asian Studies of Jinan University from 2009 to 2010 in Guangdong (China). Teaching political science, economics, and society.

=== Macao Foundation ===
Scholarship at the Macao Foundation from 2010 to 2011 in Macau (China). A study of the Chinese of Macau. Identity, case studies, life stories, and prospects.

== Bibliography ==
Berlie is the author of hundred of articles and reviews, has held numerous conferences, and written many books under the names Jean Berlie, Jean A. Berlie, Johan Berlie, Hanlin, or 韓林.

- China's Globalization and the Belt and Road Initiative, published 2020.
- East Timor independence, Indonesia and ASEAN, published in 2017.
- The Chinese of Macao a decade after the handover, published in 2012.
- The Burmanization of Myanmar's Muslims, the acculturation of the Muslims in Burma including Arakan, published in 2008.
- East Timor, politics and elections (in Chinese)/ 东帝汶政治与选举 (2001–2006): 国家建设及前景展望, published in 2007.
- Islam in China, Hui and Uyghurs: between modernization and sinicization, the study of the Hui and Uyghurs of China, published in 2004.
- East Timor: a bibliography, a bibliographic reference on a newest independent country, launched by PM Xanana Gusmão, published in 2001.
- Macau's overview at the turn of the century, published in 2000.
- Macao 2000, an overview of Macau edited by Jean A. Berlie before the handover to China, published in December 1999.
- Sinicization: at the crossing of three China regions, an ethnic minority becoming increasingly more Chinese: the Kam People, officially called Dong People (in French)/ Sinisation: à la limite de trois provinces de Chine, une minorité de plus en plus chinoise: les locuteurs kam, officiellement appelés Dong, published in 1998.
- Sinicization of the Kam (Dong People), a China minority (in French)/ Sinisation d'une minorité de Chine, les Kam (Dong), published in 1994.
- Neua (Na) in Yunnan (PRC) and the LPDR: a minority and a "non-minority" in the Chinese and Lao political systems, published in 1993.
- The Tai of China: Zhongguo de Dai zu (in French)/ Les Tai de Chine: Zhongguo de Dai zu, published in 1991.
- A Malay village of Kedah: rice growing, kinship, beliefs (in French)/ Un Village malais du Kedah: riziculture, parenté, croyances, published in 1984.
- Tepi Laut: a Malay village on the coast (in French)/ Tepi Laut: un village malais au bord de la mer, published in 1983.
- The Rajbanshis: preliminary enquiry towards a study of a complex ethnic group of South-East Nepal and Bengal, published in 1982.
