= Waimoa language =

Malayo-Polynesian language spoken in northeast East Timor

Waimoa
- Region: Northeast East Timor
- Native speakers: 21,200 (2015 census); 5,670 L2 speakers (2015 census)
- Language family: Austronesian ?: Malayo-Polynesian; Central–Eastern; Timoric; Kawaimina; Waimoa

Language codes
- ISO 639-3: wmh
- Glottolog: waim1252
- ELP: Waimaʼa; Waima'a
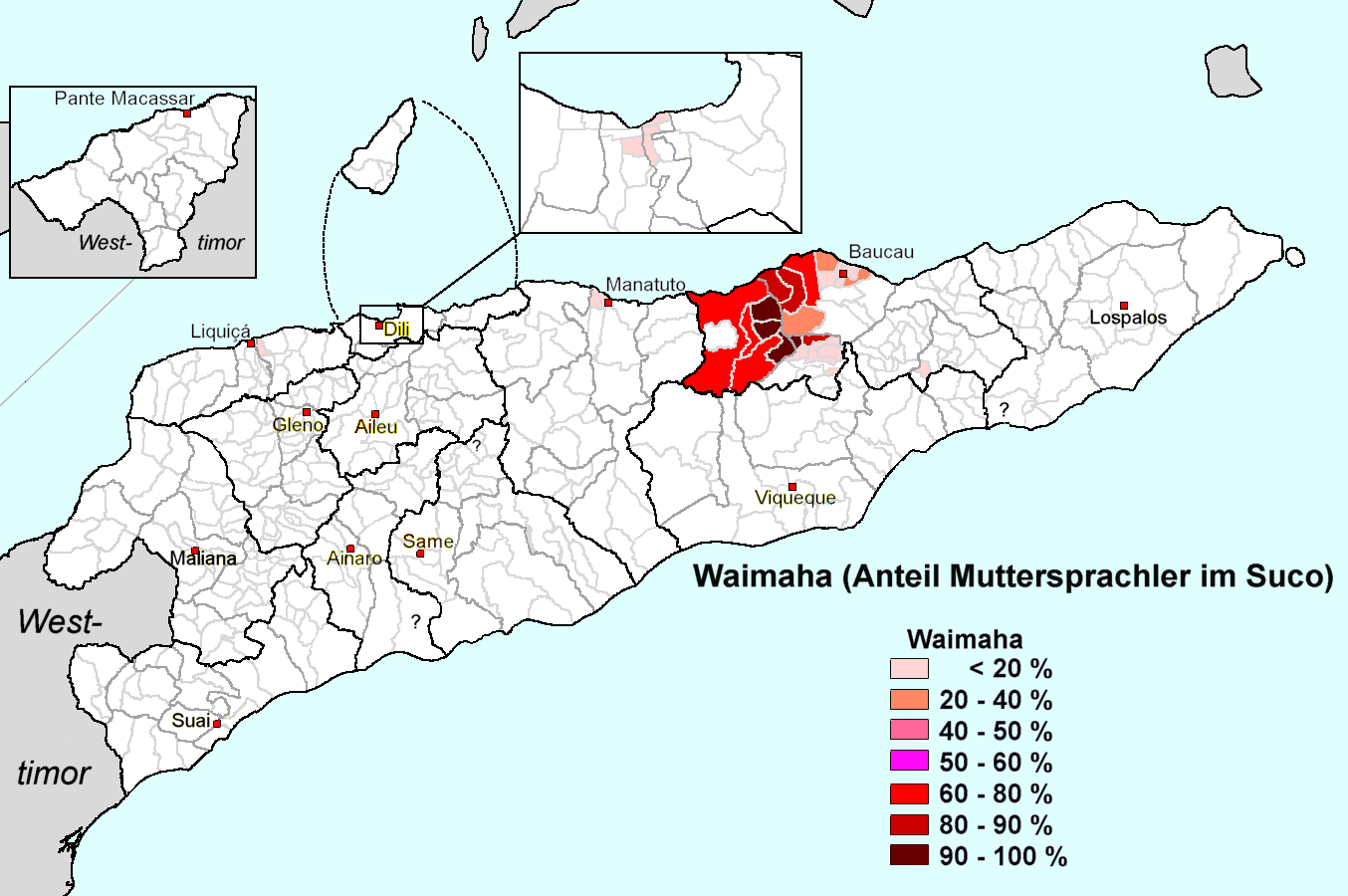
- Distribution of Waimaha mother-tongue speakers in East Timor

Waimoa or Waimaʼa is a language spoken by about 27,000 Waimoa (2015 census) people in northeast East Timor. Waimoa proper is reported to be mutually intelligible with neighboring Kairui and Midiki, which together have about 5,000 speakers.

The classification of Waimoa is unclear. Structurally, it is Malayo-Polynesian. However, its vocabulary is largely Papuan, similar to that of Makasae. Although generally classified as Austronesian languages or dialects that have been largely relexified under the influence of a language related to Makasae, it is possible that Waimoa, Kairui, and Midiki are instead Papuan languages related to Makasae which have been influenced by Austronesian.

== Phonology ==
Waimoa has aspirated/voiceless and glottalized/ejective consonants, which are distributed like /hC/ and /ʔC/ consonant clusters (or perhaps /Ch/ and /Cʔ/) but are often pronounced as single segments.

Waimoa plosives
	Bilabial	Coronal	Velar	Glottal
Voiceless unaspirated		t	k	ʔ
Voiceless aspirated	pʰ	tʰ	kʰ	
Voiceless ejective	pʼ ~ pˀ	tʼ ~ tˀ	kʼ ~ kˀ	
Voiced plain	b	d	ɡ	

Similarly there are voiceless and glottalized /m n l r s w/.

There is also vowel harmony.

== See also ==
- Kawaimina
