= List of current interior ministers =

This is a list of current interior ministers of the 193 United Nations member states, Holy See (Vatican City) and the State of Palestine.

Interior ministers of sovereign countries with limited recognition and governments-in-exile are included in separate tables.

== Generally recognised states ==
State	List	Interior minister	Political affiliation	Assumed office	Ref.
Afghanistan	List	Sirajuddin Haqqani	Taliban	7 September 2021	
Albania	List	Besfort Lamallari	Socialist Party	26 February 2026	
Algeria		Saïd Sayoud		14 September 2025	
Andorra		Josep Maria Rossell i Pons	Committed Citizens	22 May 2019	
Angola		Eugénio César Laborinho	People's Movement for the Liberation	29 July 2019	
Antigua and Barbuda		Steadroy Benjamin	Labour Party	13 June 2014	
Argentina	List	Diego Santilli	Republican Proposal	10 November 2025	
Armenia	List	Arpine Sargsyan	Independent	20 November 2024	
Australia	List	Tony Burke	Labor Party	29 July 2024	
Austria	List	Gerhard Karner	People's Party	6 December 2021	
Azerbaijan	List	Colonel General Vilayat Eyvazov		20 June 2019	
The Bahamas		Wayne Munroe	Progressive Liberal Party	20 September 2021	
Bahrain	List	Rashid bin Abdullah Al Khalifa		22 May 2004	
Bangladesh	List	Salahuddin Ahmed	Nationalist Party	17 February 2026	
Barbados		Wilfred Abrahams	Labour Party	23 July 2020	
Belarus	List	Major General Ivan Kubrakov		29 October 2020	
Belgium	List	Bernard Quintin	Reformist Movement	3 February 2025	
Belize		Kareem Musa	PUP	13 November 2020	
Benin		Alassane Seidou	Independent	25 May 2021	
Bhutan		Lyonpo Tshering		28 January 2024	
Bolivia		Marco Antonio Oviedo		9 November 2025	
Bosnia and Herzegovina	List	Ramo Isak	People's Power	28 April 2023	
Bosnia and Herzegovina	List	Željko Budimir	Alliance of Independent Social Democrats	2 September 2025	
Botswana		Honorary General Pius Mokgware	Alliance for Progressives	14 November 2024	
Brazil	List	Wellington Lima e Silva		15 January 2026	
Brazil	List	Waldez Góes	Democratic Labour Party	1 January 2023	
Brunei		Ahmaddin Rahman		7 June 2022	
Bulgaria		Ivan Demerdzhiev	PB	8 May 2026	
Burkina Faso		Mahamoudou Sana		21 October 2022	
Burundi		Léonidas Ndaruzaniye	CNND-FDD	5 August 2025	
Cambodia		Sar Sokha	Cambodian People's Party	22 August 2023	
Cameroon		Laurent Esso	Cameroon People's Democratic Movement	9 December 2011	
Canada	List	Gary Anandasangaree	Liberal Party of Canada	13 May 2025	
Cape Verde		Paulo Rocha		2016	
Central African Republic		Michel Nicaise Nassin		2022	
Chad		Idriss Dokony Adiker			
Chile	List	Carolina Tohá	Party for Democracy	6 September 2022	
China	List	Lu Zhiyuan	Chinese Communist Party	29 December 2023	
Colombia	List	Juan Fernando Cristo	Liberal Party	3 July 2024	
Comoros		Mahamoud Fakridine			
Republic of the Congo		Raymond Zephirin Mboulou	Congolese Party of Labour	30 December 2007	
Democratic Republic of the Congo		Jacquemain Shabani			
Costa Rica		Mario Zamora Cordero			
Ivory Coast		Vagondo Diomande			
Croatia	List	Davor Božinović	Croatian Democratic Union	9 June 2017	
Cuba	List	Lázaro Alberto Álvarez Casas	Communist Party of Cuba	24 November 2020	
Cyprus		Konstantinos Ioannou			
Czech Republic		Lubomír Metnar	ANO 2011	15 December 2025	
Denmark	List	Pia Olsen Dyhr	SF	3 June 2026	
Djibouti		Hassan Omar Mohamed Bourhan			
Dominica		Rayburn Blackmoore			
Dominican Republic		Jesús Vásquez Martínez		16 August 2020	
East Timor	List	Francisco da Costa Guterres	CNRT	1 July 2023	
Ecuador		Monica Rosa Irene Palencia Nunez			
Egypt	List	Major General Mahmoud Tawfik		14 June 2018	
El Salvador		Juan Carlos Bidegain Hananía			
Equatorial Guinea		Faustino Ndong Esono Ayang			
Estonia	List	Igor Taro	E200	25 March 2025	
Eswatini		Princess Lindiwe Dlamini			
Fiji		Pio Tikoduadua	NFP	24 December 2022	
Finland	List	Mari Rantanen	Finns Party	20 June 2023	
France	List	Laurent Nuñez	Renaissance	12 October 2025	
Gabon		Hermann Immongault		9 September 2023	
(The Gambia) Gambia	List	Abdoulie Sanyang		15 March 2024	
Georgia	List	Vakhtang Gomelauri	Georgian Dream	8 September 2019	
Germany	List	Alexander Dobrindt	Christian Social Union in Bavaria	6 May 2025	
Ghana		Muntaka Mohammed Mubarak	National Democratic Congress	30 January 2025	
Greece	List	Thodoris Livanios	New Democracy	14 June 2024	
Grenada		Dickon Mitchell (prime minister)	National Democratic Congress	24 June 2022	
Guatemala		Francisco Jiménez Irungaray			
Guinea		Mahmoudou Cissé			
Guinea-Bissau		Botche Cande			
Guyana		Robeson Benn		5 August 2020	
Haiti	List	Garry Conille	Independent	12 June 2024	
Honduras		Tomás Vaquero			
Hungary	List	Gábor Pósfai	TISZA	13 May 2026	
Iceland	List	Vacant		11 January 2017	
India	List	Amit Shah	Bharatiya Janata Party	31 May 2019	
Indonesia	List	Tito Karnavian	Independent	23 October 2019	
Iran	List	Eskandar Momeni	Independent	21 August 2024	
Iraq	List	Abdul Amir al-Shammari		28 October 2022	
Ireland	List	Jim O'Callaghan	Fianna Fáil	23 January 2025	
Israel	List	Yariv Levin	Likud	24 January 2023	
Italy	List	Matteo Piantedosi	Independent	22 October 2022	
Japan	List	Hisayuki Fujii	Liberal Democratic Party	17 September 2026	
Jordan		Mazin Al Farrayeh		7 March 2020	
Kazakhstan	List	Erjan Sädenov		2 September 2023	
Kenya		Kithure Kindiki		8 August 2024	
Kiribati	List	Boutu Bateriki		2020	
Kuwait	List	Fahad Yusuf Al-Sabah		17 January 2024	
Kyrgyzstan	List	Ulan Niyazbekov		2020	
Laos		Vilai Lakhamfong			
Latvia	List	Rihards Kozlovskis	Unity	15 September 2023	
Lebanon	List	Ahmad al-Hajjar	Independent	8 February 2025	
Lesotho		Lebona Lephema	Revolution for Prosperity	2022	
Liberia		Francis Sakila Nyumalin			
Libya		Imad Tarabulsi			
Liechtenstein		Hugo Quaderer			
Lithuania	List	Agnė Bilotaitė	Homeland Union	11 December 2020	
Luxembourg		Léon Gloden	Christian Social People's Party	17 November 2023	
Macedonia	List	Panche Toshkovski	VMRO-DPMNE	28 January 2024	
Madagascar		Hanitra Velonjara Tiaray Rakotonandrasana		28 October 2025	
Malawi		Ken Zikhale Ng'oma	Malawi Congress Party	31 January 2023	
Malaysia	List	Saifuddin Nasution Ismail	Pakatan Harapan (People's Justice Party)	3 December 2022	
Maldives	List	Ali Ihusaan	Progressive Party of Maldives	17 November 2023	
Mali		Daoud Aly Mohammedine			
Malta		Byron Camilleri			
Marshall Islands	List	Wisely Zackhras		2024	
Mauritania		El Moctar Ould Ahmed Bouceif	El Insaf Party	10 October 2026	
Mauritius		Pravind Jugnauth (prime minister)			
Mexico	List	Rosa Icela Rodríguez	Morena	1 October 2024	
Micronesia		Leonito Bacalando			
Moldova	List	Daniella Misail-Nichitin	Independent	19 November 2024	
Monaco		Patrice Cellario		4 April 2015	
Mongolia	List	Altangerel Oyunsaikhan		10 July 2024	
Montenegro	List	Filip Adžić	URA	28 April 2022	
Morocco	List	Abdelouafi Laftit	Independent	5 April 2017	
Mozambique		Arsenia Felicidade Felix Massingue			
Myanmar		Moe Aung		7 January 2024	
Namibia	List	Albert Kawana		22 April 2021	
Nauru		Charmaine Scotty			
Nepal	List	Sudan Gurung	Rastriya Swatantra Party	27 March 2026	
Netherlands	List	Pieter Heerma	Christian Democratic Appeal	23 February 2026	
New Zealand	List	Brooke van Velden	ACT New Zealand	27 November 2023	
Nicaragua		Maria Amelia Coronel Kinloch			
Niger		Mohamed Toumba	Military	9 August 2023	
Nigeria	List	Olubunmi Tunji-Ojo	All Progressives Congress	21 August 2023	
Norway		Astri Aas-Hansen	Labour	4 February 2025	
Oman	List	Hamoud bin Faisal al Busaidi		2011	
Pakistan	List	Mohsin Naqvi	Independent	11 March 2024	
Palestine (Note: The Palestinian Authority renamed itself the State of Palestine on 6 January 2013 (a move not recognized by Israel). Do not confuse with the "State of Palestine" proclaimed on 15 November 1988 by the Palestinian National Council, which remains a putative state, de facto ineffective despite partial international recognition.)	List	Ziad Hab Al-Reeh		1 April 2024	
Panama		Juan Manuel Pino Forero			
Papua New Guinea		John Rosso			
Paraguay		Enrique Riera Escudero	Colorado Party	15 August 2023	
Peru		César Astudillo	Independent	28 July 2026	
Philippines	List	Jonvic Remulla	NUP	8 October 2024	
Poland	List	Tomasz Siemoniak	Civic Platform	13 May 2024	
Portugal		Margarida Blasco	Independent	2 April 2024	
Qatar		Khalifa bin Hamad bin Khalifa Al Thani		7 March 2023	
Romania	List	Marian Neacșu	Social Democratic Party	20 October 2026	
Russia	List	Vladimir Kolokoltsev	Independent	21 May 2012	
Rwanda		Alfred Gasana		10 December 2021	
Saint Kitts and Nevis		Terrance Drew (prime minister)	Saint Kitts and Nevis Labour Party	13 August 2022	
Saint Lucia		Virginia Albert-Poyotte	Saint Lucia Labour Party	5 August 2021	
Saint Vincent and the Grenadines		Godwin Friday (prime minister)	New Democratic Party		
Samoa		Lefau Harry Schuster	Faʻatuatua i le Atua Samoa ua Tasi	24 May 2021	
San Marino		Elena Tonnini	RETE Movement	7 January 2020	
São Tomé and Príncipe		Jorge Amado			
Saudi Arabia	List	Abdulaziz bin Saud Al Saud		21 June 2017	
Senegal	List	Jean Baptiste Tine		5 April 2024	
Serbia	List	Ivica Dačić	Socialist Party of Serbia	2 May 2024	
Seychelles		Errol Fonseka	Linyon Demokratik Seselwa	3 November 2020	
Sierra Leone		David Taluva			
Singapore	List	K. Shanmugam	People's Action Party	1 October 2015	
Slovakia		Matúš Šutaj Eštok	Voice – Social Democracy	25 October 2023	
Slovenia	List	Boštjan Poklukar	Freedom Movement	21 February 2023	
Solomon Islands		Isikeli Vave	Independent	6 May 2024	
Somalia		Ali Yusuf Hosh		8 April 2024	
South Africa	List	Leon Schreiber	Democratic Alliance	2024	
South Korea	List	Yun Ho-jung	Independent	19 July 2025	
South Sudan		Angelina Teny			
Spain	List	Fernando Grande-Marlaska	Independent	7 June 2018	
Sri Lanka	List	Ananda Wijepala	National People's Power	18 November 2024	
Sudan		Ezzeldin Al-Sheikh			
Suriname		Bronto Somohardjo	Pertjajah Luhur	16 July 2020	
Sweden	List	Gunnar Strömmer	Moderate Party	18 October 2022	
Switzerland	List	Élisabeth Baume-Schneider	Social Democratic Party of Switzerland	1 January 2024	
Syria	List	Anas Khattab	Independent	29 March 2025	
Tajikistan		Ramazon Rahimov		5 January 2012	
Tanzania	List	Hamad Masauni	Chama Cha Mapinduzi	10 January 2022	
Thailand		Anutin Charnvirakul (prime minister)	Bhumjaithai Party	19 September 2025	
Togo		Damehane Yark			
Tonga		Lord Vaea		1 September 2022	
Tunisia	List	Khaled Nouri		2024	
Turkey	List	Ali Yerlikaya	Independent	4 June 2023	
Turkmenistan		Muhammet Hydyrow			
Tuvalu		Maina Vakafua Talia			
Uganda		Kahinda Otafiire		8 June 2021	
Ukraine	List	Ivan Vyhivskyi	Independent	16 July 2026	
United Arab Emirates		Saif bin Zayed Al Nahyan		1 November 2004	
United Kingdom	List	Shabana Mahmood	Labour	5 September 2025	
United States	List	Markwayne Mullin	Republican	24 March 2026	
Uruguay	List	Carlos Negro	Broad Front	1 March 2025	
Uzbekistan	List	Pulat Bobojonov		2017	
Vanuatu		Andrew Solomon Napuat	Land and Justice Party		
Venezuela	List	Remigio Ceballos		19 August 2021	
Vietnam	List	Phạm Thị Thanh Trà	Communist Party of Vietnam	8 April 2021	
Zambia	List	Jack Mwiimbu	United Party for National Development	24 August 2021	
Zimbabwe		Kazembe Kazembe	Zimbabwe African National Union – Patriotic Front	9 November 2019	

== States with limited recognition ==
State	List	Interior minister	Political affiliation	Assumed office
Abkhazia (Republic of Abkhazia)				
Kosovo (Republic of Kosovo)		Flamur Sefaj		
Northern Cyprus (Turkish Republic of Northern Cyprus)		Aziz Gürpınar	Republican Turkish Party	
Western Sahara (Sahrawi Arab Democratic Republic)		Brahim Bashir Billah	Polisario Front	
South Ossetia (Republic of South Ossetia–the State of Alania)				
Taiwan (Republic of China)	List	Liu Shyh-fang	Democratic Progressive Party	20 May 2024
Transnistria (Pridnestrovian Moldavian Republic)				

== Sui generis entities ==
Entity	List	Interior minister	Political affiliation	Assumed office
European Union	List	Magnus Brunner	European People's Party	1 December 2024

== Governments-in-exile ==
Government-in-exile	Interior minister	Political affiliation	Assumed office
National Unity Government of Myanmar	Lwin Ko Latt	National League for Democracy	16 April 2021

== See also ==
- Lists of office-holders
