= Murder of Palomita Gusmão =

2026 femicide in Dili, Timor-Leste

Palomita Gusmão Guterres
- Died: 18 November 2026; Dili, Timor-Leste
- Cause of death: Stabbing
- Resting place: Becusi Cemetery
- Occupation: University student
- Known for: Victim of femicide and intimate partner violence

Palomita Gusmão Guterres was a young woman who was abducted and murdered by her former romantic partner on 18 November 2026 in Dili, Timor-Leste. Videos of the victim's abduction and of the suspect allegedly admitting to the murder went viral on social media in Timor-Leste and Indonesian West Timor. Gusmão's murder drew widespread public outcry in Timor-Leste from civil society organizations, women's groups, and political figures.

== Background ==
Palomita Gusmão Guterres, also known by her nickname "Palo", was a 20-year-old university student who lived with her family in the Matadouro neighborhood of Dili. She graduated high school at Colégio de São José Operário in 2025, and began studying accounting at the Dili Institute of Technology (DIT) in 2026. According to her family, she was a good student who maintained healthy relationships, was involved in church activities, and participated in fashion shows.

The suspect, Jeovanio dos Reis da Costa, was 19 years old at the time of the murder and lived in Tasi Tolu. His father is an officer in the Timor-Leste Defence Force (F-FDTL). According to Gusmão's friend, he and Gusmão had dated for four years, but Gusmão had recently ended the relationship because of his poor character. Gusmão's family has stated that they were unaware of any relationship between Gusmão and da Costa, as he had never introduced himself to the family.

Timor-Leste has high rates of violence against women and intimate partner violence. The United Nations Population Fund reports that 59 percent of East Timorese girls and women between the ages of 15 to 49 have experienced physical or sexual violence at the hands of a partner. Civil society and women's groups have often criticized state and police responses to violence against women as inadequate. In one high-profile case in August 2024, after a woman was assaulted by her husband in Taibessi Market, a police commander, Orlando Gomes, threatened to physically assault a female reporter who questioned the lack of response by police. Eight months before Gusmão's death, another young woman was killed in Dili by her partner, in a case where the family claimed to have sought police assistance before the homicide occurred. According to JU,S Jurídico Social, a human rights-focused legal firm, Timor-Leste recorded more than 10 cases of femicide between 2024 and 2025.

== Murder ==
Media reporting on the timeline of the murder draws heavily from the account of an anonymous friend and classmate, identified by her initial "A.," who was with Palomita Gusmão when she was abducted. Statements by police and Gusmão's family, along with videos recorded by witnesses and the suspect, provide additional details.

According to A., on the day before the murder, the suspect reportedly went to the DIT campus dressed in university attire (although he was not a student there) to look for Gusmão. Gusmão reportedly learned of this, and as a result did not go to campus that day. On 18 November 2026, Gusmão was at the DIT campus for a 1 p.m. class, but the professor did not show up. Afraid to return home alone by mikrolet for fear that her ex-boyfriend might find her, Gusmão accepted an offer from a male classmate to drive her and another female friend (A.) home. Unbeknownst to them, the suspect was reportedly waiting nearby and began following them on a motorbike as they left the campus. A. stated, "At that moment, we didn't know or see that the suspect was at the school. That's why we decided to take Palomita back home."

As their car passed by a W-Four supermarket in the Hudilaran neighborhood, Gusmão spotted the suspect and alerted her friends. The suspect came close enough to touch the car before driving ahead, frequently looking back at the vehicle carrying Gusmão. Gusmão video called her father, crying, to inform him that she and her friends were being followed by the suspect. When they reached the Plur area of Bairro Pite, the suspect stopped on the sidewalk before turning into the street to block the car with his motorbike. When the car stopped, the male classmate told the suspect that he was driving two friends home and that Gusmão was not inside. The suspect continued looking for Gusmão and demanded she get out of the car. The driver tried to lock the doors, but the suspect managed to open the back door, where Gusmão was still crying and speaking to her father on the phone. He grabbed her and, despite Gusmão's resistance, managed to forcibly remove her from the vehicle. According to A.'s account, she wanted to try to help Gusmão, but the male classmate warned her not to, or her safety would also be at risk.

In a video recorded by one of her friends from inside the car, Gusmão can be seen screaming for help as the suspect pulled her towards his motorbike. A number of onlookers stood nearby watching, but no one intervened. The two friends decided to return to DIT, leaving Gusmão behind with the suspect. According to A., on the way back, they witnessed the suspect driving in Manleu with Gusmão on his motorbike. She stated that Gusmão was sitting in front of the suspect, not on the back of the bike like a passenger would normally sit. According to A., she asked others to help follow the suspect, but was unsuccessful.

Meanwhile, Gusmão's family tried to contact her, but her phone and bag were still inside the classmate's car. Her classmates answered the calls and spoke with the family members, who then went to the university campus to collect her belongings. Gusmão's friends managed to obtain the suspect's phone number and called him; he allegedly stated, "Palo's been killed already" (Tetun: "Palo, nia oho tiha ona") before hanging up.

After abducting her from Bairro Pite, the suspect brought Gusmão to a room inside his home in Tasi Tolu, aldeia 12 de Outubro, near the former F-FDTL headquarters. There, at around 2:45 p.m., he stabbed her repeatedly. In a video released on social media the same day, the suspect allegedly admitted to killing someone, showing blood on his clothes and asking friends to come help him. Police arrived shortly after and secured the scene. Community members transported Gusmão via mikrolet to the Comoro Health Center, arriving at 3:08 p.m. She arrived in severe condition, having lost a large amount of blood and suffering wounds on her throat, stomach, arms, and other parts of her body. After administering initial care, clinic staff called an ambulance to transport her to Guido Valadares National Hospital for advanced treatment, where she died.

== Investigation ==
According to Orlando Gomes, the National Police of Timor-Leste (PNTL) commander in Dili Municipality, when police learned of the incident, they sent officers to secure the scene, collect evidence, and accompany the victim. The suspect, Jeovanio dos Reis da Costa, turned himself in at the Dom Aleixo police station in Dili on the same day of the murder. He was issued a 72-hour detention, and was initially held in Dom Aleixo before being transferred to a police facility in Caicoli. A knife was taken from the suspect as evidence.

Police stated on the day following the murder that they were treating the case as an aggravated homicide, citing initial evidence pointing to premeditation. They also stated that preliminary investigations indicated Gusmão's decision to end the romantic relationship between her and the suspect as the likely motive.

An autopsy of the victim was carried out on 19 November.

On the morning on 21 November 2026, the suspect underwent an initial interrogation at the Dili court of first instance in a session presided over by judge José Escurial. The event was marked by tears and demands for justice by the victim's family, who appeared at the courthouse at the time of the proceedings.

== Aftermath ==
=== Reactions ===
On the day of the murder, Gusmão's family held a press conference in which they called for a thorough and transparent investigation and justice for the perpetrator. Videos associated with the incident, most notably a recording of Gusmão being pulled by the suspect onto his motorbike, and another of the suspect allegedly admitting to the murder and showing his blood-stained clothes, quickly went viral on social media in Timor-Leste as well as in Indonesian West Timor.

Gusmão's death sparked a wave of reactions from East Timorese civil society and women's groups, including Aliansa Labarik Feto, Feminista Progressiva, FOKUPERS, the Judicial Service Monitoring Project, Rede Feto, Organizasaun Timor-oan Unidade ba Nafatin, and Timor-Leste Youth Parliament alumni association. They demanded a swift, rigorous, and transparent investigation and condemned the normalization of violence against women and the indifference shown by bystanders to Gusmão's pleas for help. Bella Galhos, a prominent feminist and human rights activist, called for awareness campaigns and institutional and legislative responses to better protect women's lives.

Fretilin, one of Timor-Leste's largest political parties, released a statement calling for a thorough investigation, support for the victim's family, and strengthened policies for the protection of women. It stated that Gusmão's death is not just a moral problem or the result of a single individual's actions, but also a consequence of the state's failure to protect the population. Virgílio Guterres, Timor-Leste's ombudsman for human rights and justice, condemned Gusmão's murder and called for the perpetrator to be held criminally responsible. He warned about the public indifference and lack of empathy in East Timorese society towards violence, citing two other recent episodes of violence against individuals in public spaces in which onlookers watched and filmed but did not intervene.

Rede Feto ("Women's Network" in Tetun) announced a peaceful march in Dili on 20 November with the theme "Together break the silence" (Tetun: Hamutuk harahun silénsiu). The demonstration began at Jardim 5 de Maio and passed by the National Parliament and Government Palace buildings before ending in a candlelight vigil at Largo de Lecidere. Former prime minister of Timor-Leste and Fretilin secretary-general Mari Alkatiri participated in the march. Two more candlelight vigils followed on 21 and 22 November, concluding with the delivery of a petition to the government on 23 November to demand an urgent response to Gusmão's and other unresolved cases.
