= National Police of Timor-Leste =

Policia Nacional de Timor Leste Polísia Nasionál Timór Lorosa'e Polícia Nacional de Timor-Leste
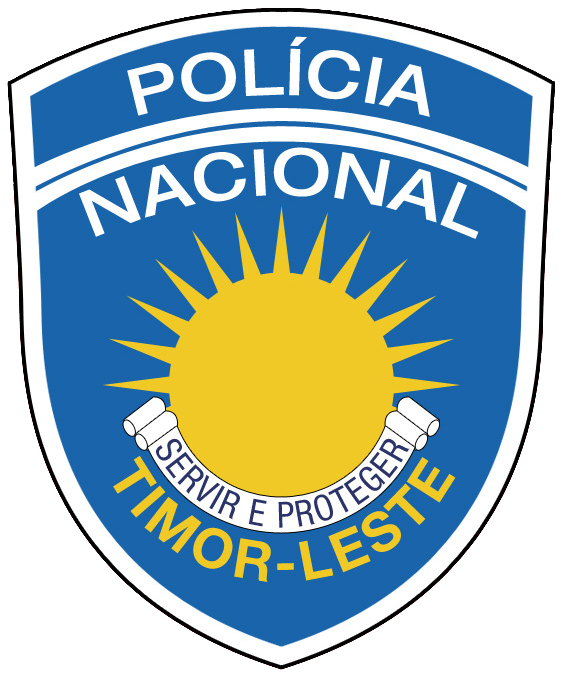
- Badge of the National Police of Timor-Leste
- Abbreviation: PNTL
- Motto: Servir e Proteger; Serve and Protect

Agency overview
- Formed: 2000; 26 years ago
- Preceding agency: East Timor Regional Police (1996–1999)
- Legal personality: Security Force

Jurisdictional structure
- National agency: Timor-Leste
- Operations jurisdiction: Timor-Leste
- Governing body: Ministry of the Interior
- General nature: Civilian police

Operational structure
- Headquarters: Dili, Timor-Leste
- Police officers: 4,337 (2024)
- Elected officer responsible: Francisco da Costa Guterres, Minister of the Interior
- Agency executive: Henrique da Costa, Commander General

Website
- www.pntl.tl

The National Police of Timor-Leste (PNTL; Portuguese: Polícia Nacional de Timor-Leste; Tetun: Polísia Nasionál Timór Lorosa'e) is the national police force of Timor-Leste. It is an armed and uniformed security force under administrative control of the Minister of the Interior. The PNTL's policing philosophy is a community police force. However, in terms of organisation, training, discipline and personnel status is identical to military. Nevertheless, the PNTL does not constitute a military force in the country, as the country's only military force is the Timor Leste Defence Force or F-FDTL. The PNTL applies tough Line and Command Hierarchy. Its principal mission based on the constitution is to defend democratic legality and maintain internal security, and guarantee security for people and property. The PNTL was established by the UN mission of the United Nations Transitional Administration in East Timor (UNTAET) through the United Nations Police in 2000. The official name of the PNTL chief is Commander General. The current Commander General of the PNTL is Police Commissioner General Henrique da Costa, M.Si.

== History ==
=== Background ===
During the Indonesian occupation, the East Timor Regional Police (Indonesian: Kepolisian Daerah Timor Timur or Polda Timtim) was responsible for law enforcement in East Timor. Polda Timtim dissolved just prior to the August 1999 East Timorese independence referendum, though up to 8,000 Indonesian police officers remained in the country during the referendum and the violence that followed. A 300-strong United Nations police force, which arrived in May 1999 to advise the Indonesian police and help maintain security during the referendum, was also present during this period. After the referendum, most police officers withdrew across the land border into Indonesian West Timor.

=== Formation and early development ===
In October 1999, the United Nations Transitional Administration in East Timor (UNTAET) assumed responsibility for law enforcement and internal security in the country. Between 2000–2002, more than 1,600 UN Civilian Police (CivPol) were deployed, with executive policing authority. From the start, UNTAET gave significant attention to the development of a police force, with US$4.3 million budgeted in 2000–2001 and plans to recruit 3,000 officers. An extensive recruitment drive was carried out in early 2000, with more than 12,000 applicants for the first cohort of 150 recruits. The new East Timor Police Training College opened in Dili to its first class of 50 cadets—39 men and 11 women—on 27 March 2000. This date is recognized by the government of Timor-Leste as the foundation of the PNTL. The first 50 cadets graduated from the police academy on 11 July 2000 after a three-month course and were deployed to their home districts for another three months of on-the-job training.

On 10 August 2001, the East Timor Police Service (ETPS) was officially established, working alongside the UN's Civilian Police (CivPol). A group of 370 East Timorese former members of the old Indonesian police force were integrated into the ETPS after an intensive four-week training course, forming the core of the new police service. With memory still fresh of the brutality of the Indonesian security services during the occupation period, the recruitment of Indonesian-era police officers into the ETPS was controversial. It also contrasted with the Timor-Leste Defence Force (F-FDTL), whose membership comprised former Falintil guerrilla fighters who had fought against the Indonesians. Some former Falintil fighters were also fast-tracked into the police service, but they were outnumbered by the former Indonesian-era police officers. An additional 150 former guerrillas were recruited into the police in March 2003 amid public pressure. This tension, along with a lack of clear delineation of functions between the two forces, led to emergence of turf wars between the police and military during the early years of independence.

During UNTAET's administration, 1,700 officers were recruited and trained for the new police service. During this period, the recruitment criteria required that applicants: be of good character and a resident of Timor-Leste; be between ages 18—35; know at least one of the languages of Timor-Leste; pass the required physical and medical tests; pass a selection interview; and receive community approval. The selection process under UNTAET had a heavy Western bias, often favoring, for example, candidates with knowledge of English—which is not one of Timor-Leste's national languages. Recruitment was also politicized, as the vetting process was heavily influenced by the politically dominant Conselho Nacional de Resistência Timorense organization.

Timor-Leste gained independence in 2002, and the East Timor Police Service was renamed the Timor-Leste Police Service (TLPS). Shortly thereafter, it adopted its current name, Policia Nacional de Timor Leste (PNTL). UNTAET was dissolved that same year, and was succeeded by the United Nations Mission of Support to East Timor (UNMISET) until 2005. For two years after independence, the United Nations continued to hold control of policing and was responsible for helping develop the PNTL. An East Timorese police chief, Paulo de Fátima Martins, had been appointed in 2001, but he held no real authority.

The UN and its police service, CivPol, faced steep challenges in establishing and training the PNTL. UN police personnel were not always well-trained or qualified, served in Timor-Leste for short (often six-month) rotations, and generally lacked prior knowledge of East Timorese culture and history. CivPol struggled with planning and competency, failing to develop effective operational, management, and accountability structures for the new police service. The UN administration prioritized getting officers on the street rather than institution building, and did not develop a comprehensive plan for the PNTL until late 2001. Moreover, the fast-tracking of former Indonesian-era police officers and Falintil fighters was perceived as favoritism by other recruits and created tensions within the police.

=== Transition to Timorese control ===
In 2004, parliament passed the PNTL's first organic law (Decree-Law No. 8/2004), laying out its structure and authority. That year, the United Nations handed over control of policing to the government of Timor-Leste, which inherited a weak and underdeveloped institution. The police then fell under the control of the Ministry of the Interior, led by Rogério Lobato, whose controversial tenure was marked by the politicization, militarization, and internal fracturing of the PNTL, and a growing rivalry with the military.

Following inadequate responses by Timor-Leste's security services to two serious incidents of violence, Lobato established new special units within the PNTL. A new riot police unit, the Unidade Intervenção Rápida (UIR), was formed after violence erupted in Dili in December 2002, during which the PNTL had responded with indiscriminate gunfire, killing five people. A new border guard unit, the Unidade de Patrulhamento de Fronteira (UPF), was created after armed groups, including former pro-Indonesia militia members, killed five people in villages around Atsabe, near the Indonesian border, in January 2003. The UIR and UPF had around 200 and 300 members, respectively, compared to the PNTL's strength of 2,800 regular police officers. The new units received paramilitary training and were armed with high-powered weapons, including assault rifles. The UIR in particular projected a "macho" image, often conspicuously displaying riot gear and heavy weaponry at public events. Despite concerns that these units had been formed for political rather than purely security purposes, the UN assisted in their training and arming.

These new units contributed to public perception that the police were being politicized and militarized, and further obscured the separation of duties between the PNTL and F-FDTL, contributing to a growing rivalry between the police and the defense force. In creating the UIR and UPF units, Lobato set up parallel chains of command within the PNTL. This, along with Lobato's tendency to issue direct operation orders and his selective treatment of disciplinary cases, exacerbated existing divisions within the police between officers from the eastern and western parts of the country, as well as between former Indonesian-era police officers and newer recruits. During this period, several factions formed within the PNTL, including the "Polícia Nationalista" group, made up of "easterner" police officers opposed to Lobato, who was of western origin.

=== 2006 crisis and aftermath ===
On 18 February 2009, a second and current organic law of the PNTL (Decree-Law No. 9/2009) was promulgated.

== Structure ==
The PNTL organisation is unique across the national territory of Timor-Leste. It has 14 police territorial units, such as municipal police commands or Komando Munisipio Policia, and 67 Police station commands or Komando Esquadra Policia. Apart from that, the police force also has 3 operational units, namely Unidade Especial de Policia (UEP) or Special Police Unit, Unidade Policia Maritima (UPM) or Maritime Police Unit and Unidade Patrulhamento de Fronteiras (UPF) or Border Patrol Unit. These 3 police operational units are equivalent to a Brigade in the Infantry. Below these units, there are a few battalions and under the battalions, there are some companies, for instance, Battalion of Public Order and Battalion of Special Operation of the PNTL's Special Police Unit (UEP). Moreover, the PNTL has a Centro Treinamento da Policia or Police Training Centre as a support unit based in Dili, Timor - Leste. Currently, the PNTL has 4,337 sworn officers as of 2024.

== Equipment ==
=== Firearms ===
- Austria: Glock 19
- Germany: Heckler & Koch G36
- US: M16 rifle
- Austria: Steyr AUG
- Belgium: FN FNC Mk2
- Germany: Heckler & Koch HK33
- Belgium: FN F2000
- Singapore: SAR 21

== Gallery ==
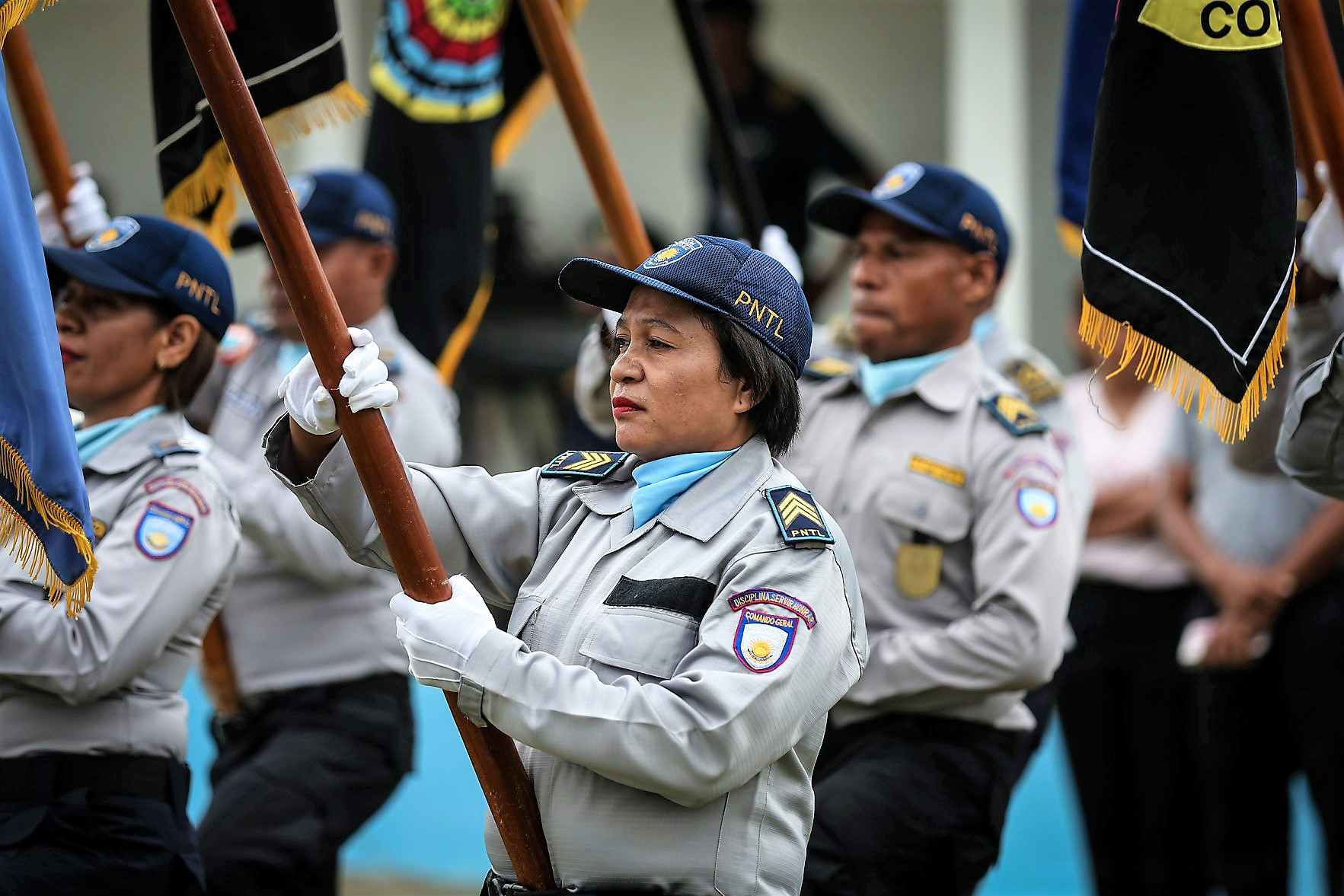
National Police of Timor-Leste officers carrying flags

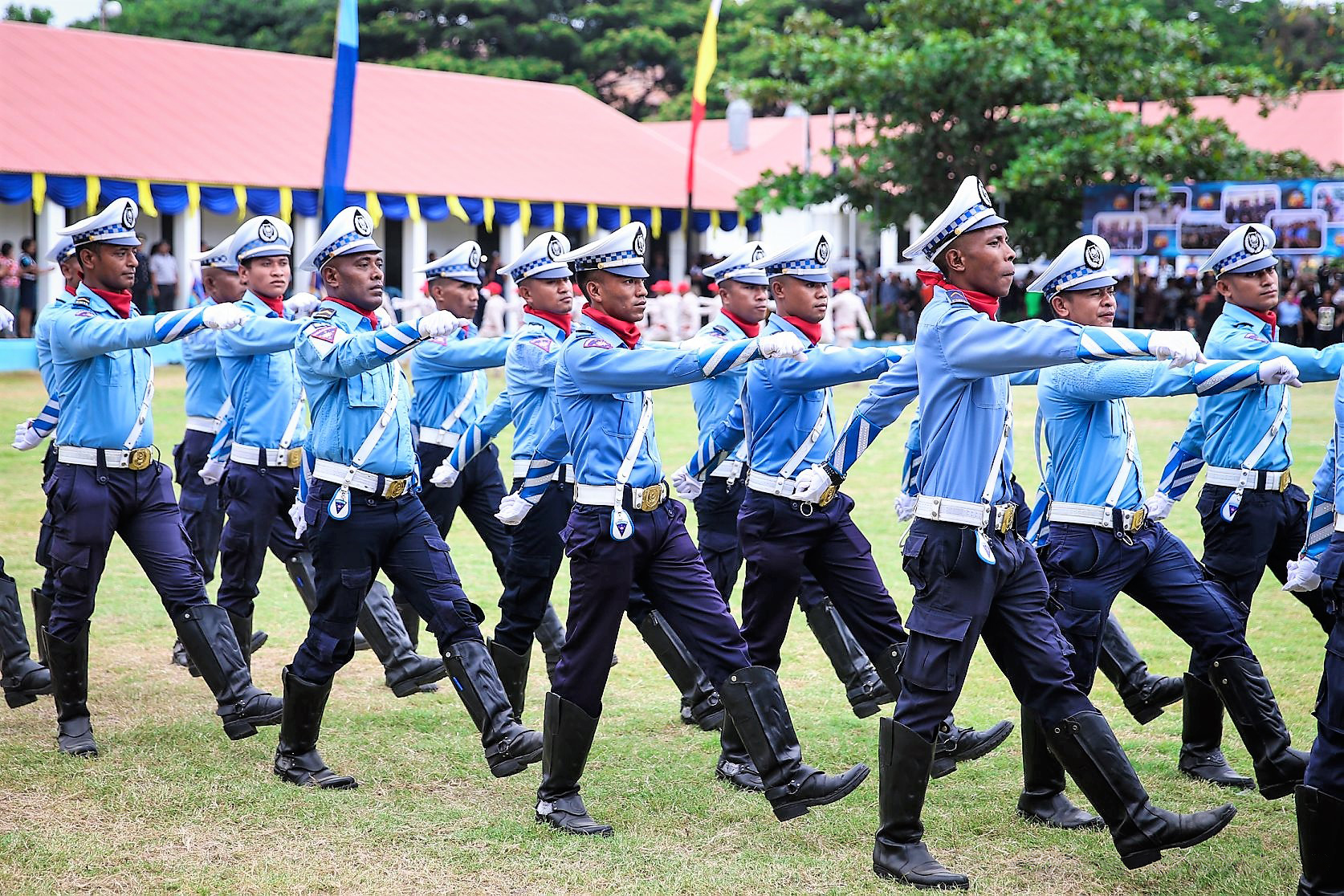
National Police of Timor-Leste officers parading

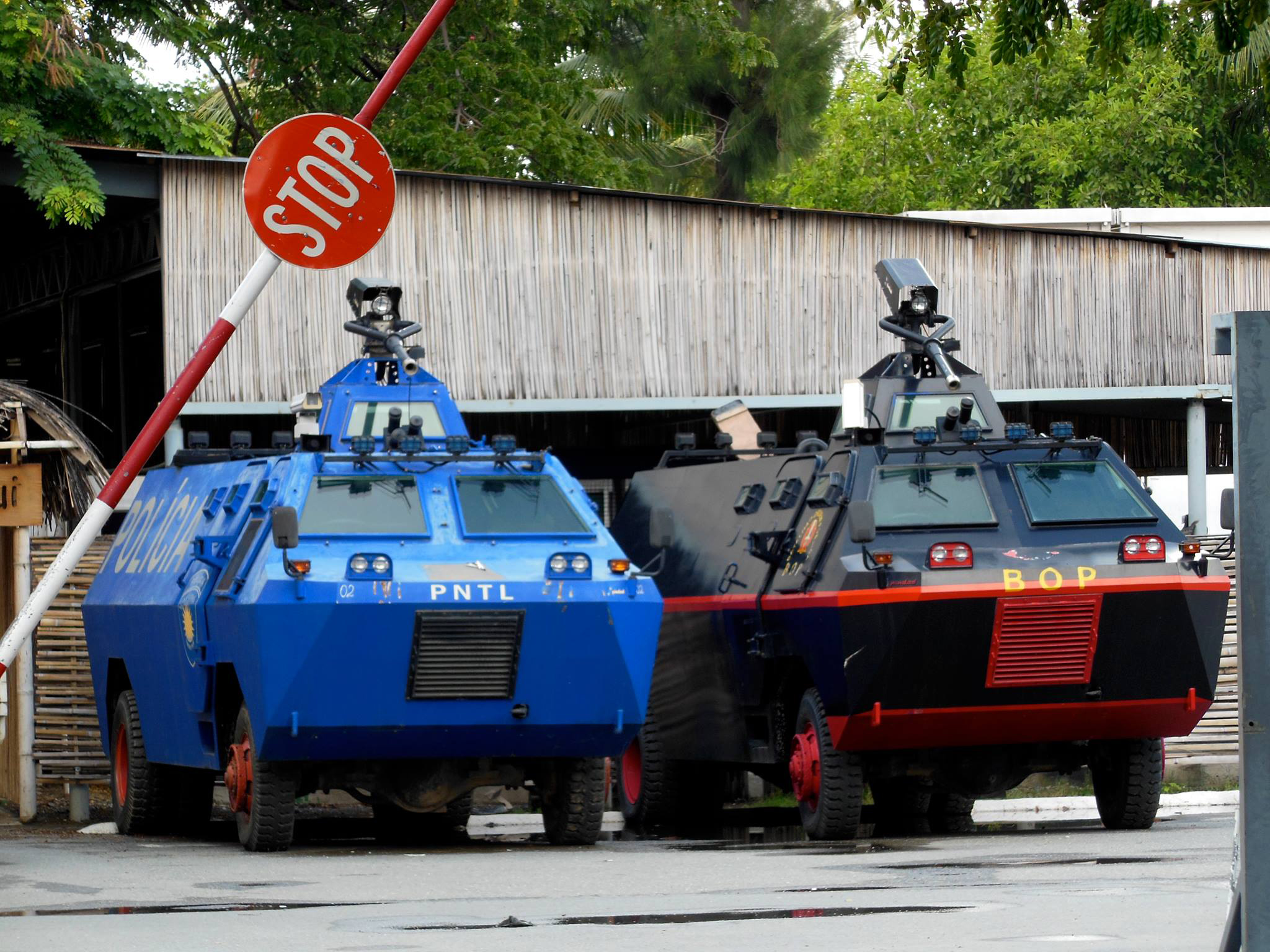
PNTL PWC-25TL APCs with water cannons

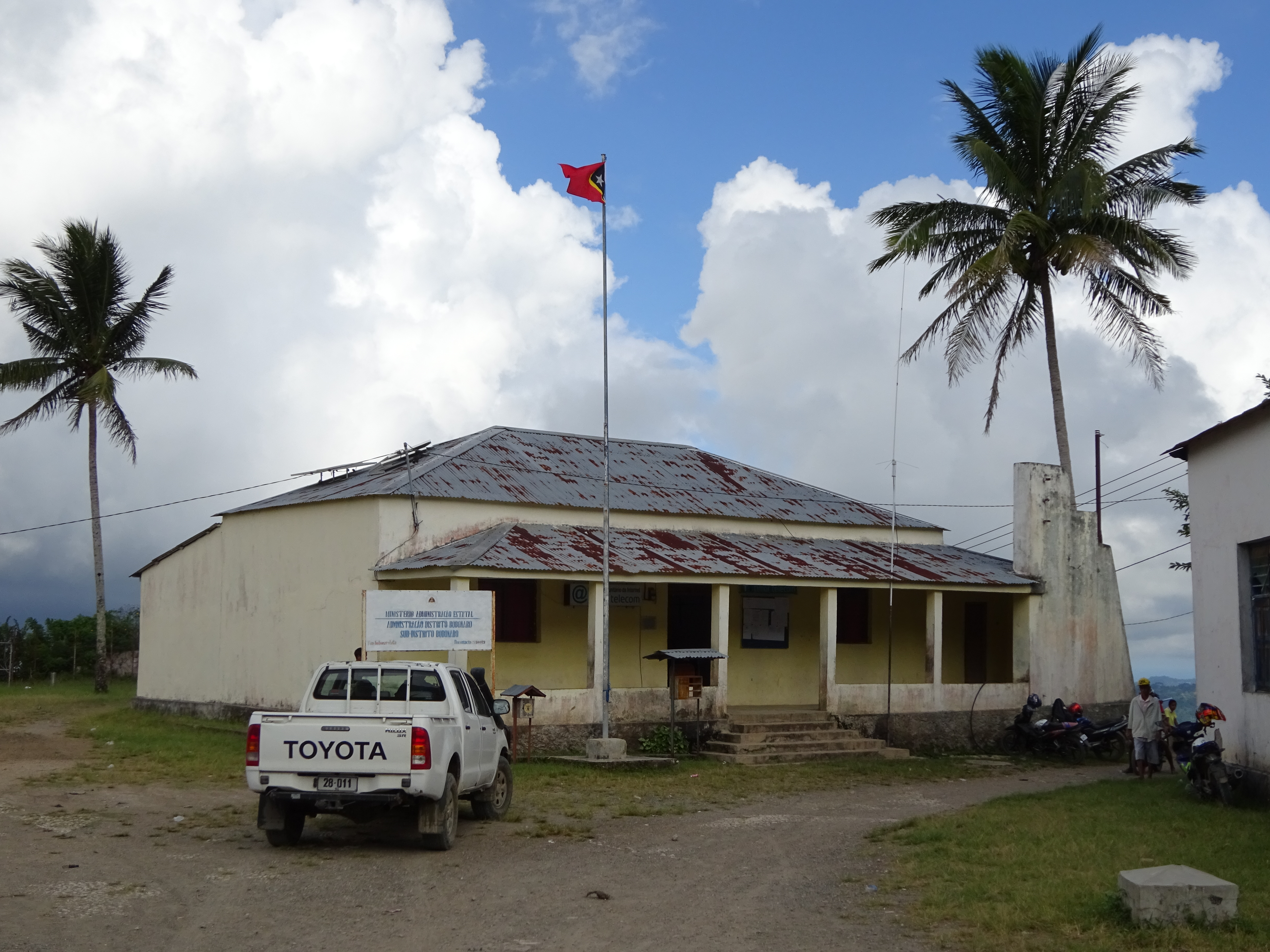
Police station at Bobonaro Village

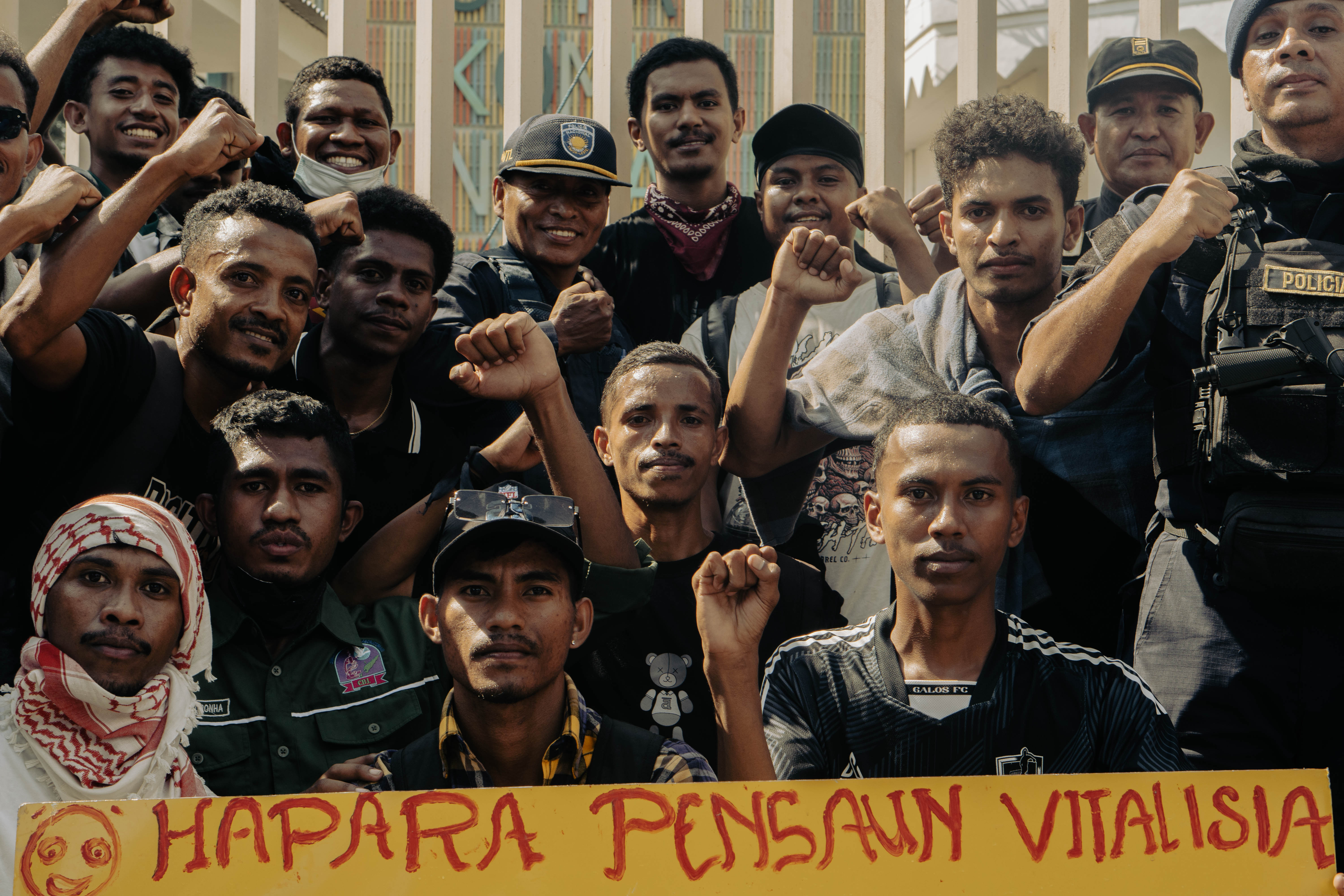
Police officers posing with protesters during the protests in 2025

=== Historical police emblems ===
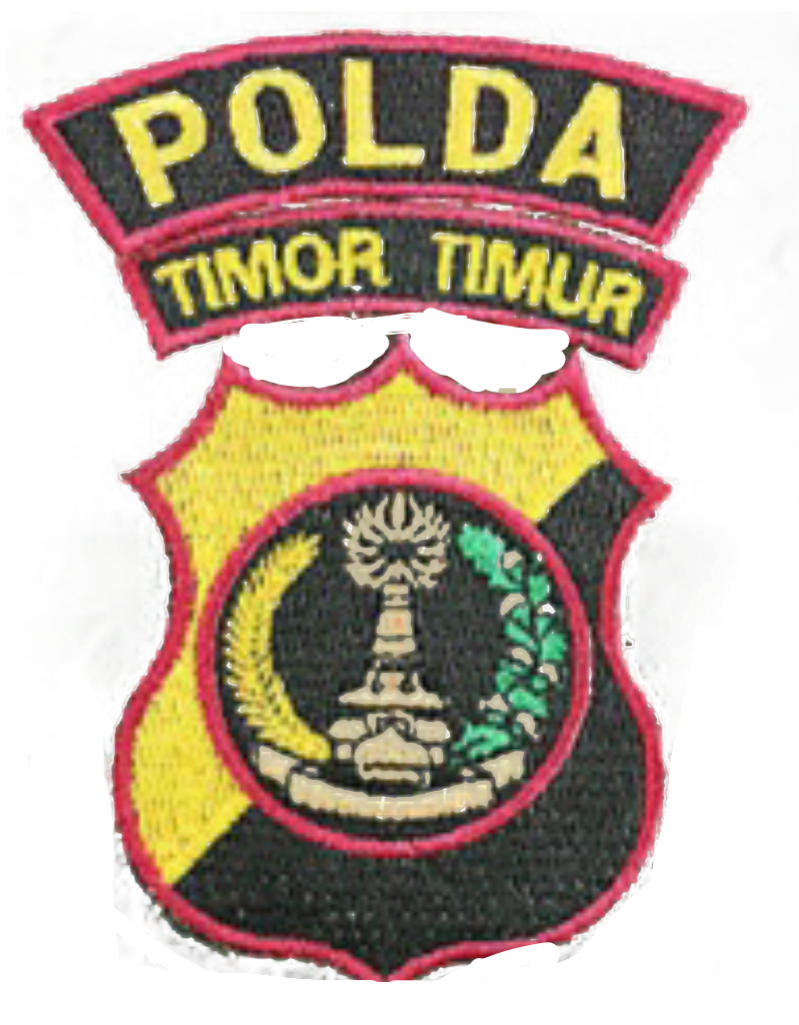
Police patch during Indonesian occupation

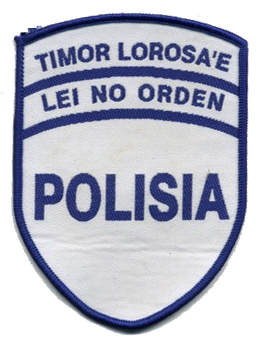
Police patch used during United Nations administration

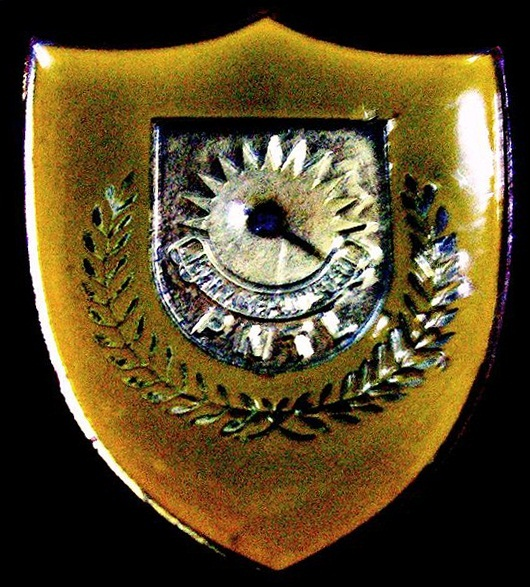
Former badge of the post-independence National Police of Timor-Leste

== Criticism ==
From its early years of existence, the PNTL has been criticized for issues including excessive use of force, arbitrary detention and abuse of detainees, politicization, inadequate training, unprofessionalism, sexual misconduct, and a lack of effective oversight.

=== Excessive use of force ===
Amnesty International reported that in 2002, PNTL officers shot and killed three people while responding to public disturbances in the cities of Dili and Baucau.

There are accusation that some PNTL officers have tortured prisoners who have been arrested.

In August 2017, the PNTL was criticized by Fundasaun Mahein for allowing its officers to be visible with heavy weapons since it undermines the force's community policing strategy.

On 18 November 2018, PNTL officer José Mina, shot dead three young men during a party in the neighborhood of Kulu Hun in Dili.
