= Kpalimé War Memorial =

War memorial in Kpalimé, Togo

- Monument aux morts de Kpalimé
- Interactive map of Kpalimé War Memorial
- Location: Kpalimé, Plateaux Region, Togo
- Coordinates: 6.90187°N 0.63392°E
- Type: Memorial

The Kpalimé War Memorial (French: Monument aux morts de Kpalimé) is a memorial located at the entrance to Kpalimé, in the Plateaux Region of Togo. It commemorates people regarded as having contributed to the defence of the territory and to the struggle for Togolese independence.

== Description ==
The monument stands in a public square at the entrance to the city of Kpalimé.

The monument consists of three large curved arms, widened at their bases and converging towards the top. They are covered with stones originating from the Kloto Mountains, particularly from the locality of Akata.

These stones are locally known as Akatakpé, a term formed from Akata, the name of the locality, and kpé, meaning "stone" in the Ewe language. The term therefore means "stone of Akata".

== Commemorative function ==
Like war memorials found in other parts of Togo, the Kpalimé monument serves as a place of remembrance for people who died in connection with the defence of the territory and the country's national history.

Official ceremonies are held at the site during certain national commemorations. On 21 June, which is observed as Martyrs' Day in Togo, wreath-laying ceremonies have taken place at the foot of the monument. One such ceremony was held in 2014 in the presence of Security and Civil Protection Minister Yark Damehame, who represented the head of state.

The monument is also cited as a site for commemorating the attack against Togo on 23 September 1986.

== Maintenance and landscaping ==
The site periodically undergoes maintenance and landscaping work. In January 2018, citizen engagement volunteers in Kpalimé took part in improvements to the site as part of activities aimed at improving the local living environment.

In June 2025, Junior Chamber International (JCI) Kpalimé Tsitsatsè organised a clean-up operation at the public square surrounding the war memorial. The operation included the removal of waste and weeds, the planting of flowers, and the installation of a sign promoting environmental protection.

== See also ==
- Kpalimé – City in Plateaux Region, Togo
- Plateaux Region – Region of Togo
