= Longuinhos Monteiro =

East Timorese jurist, administrator and politician

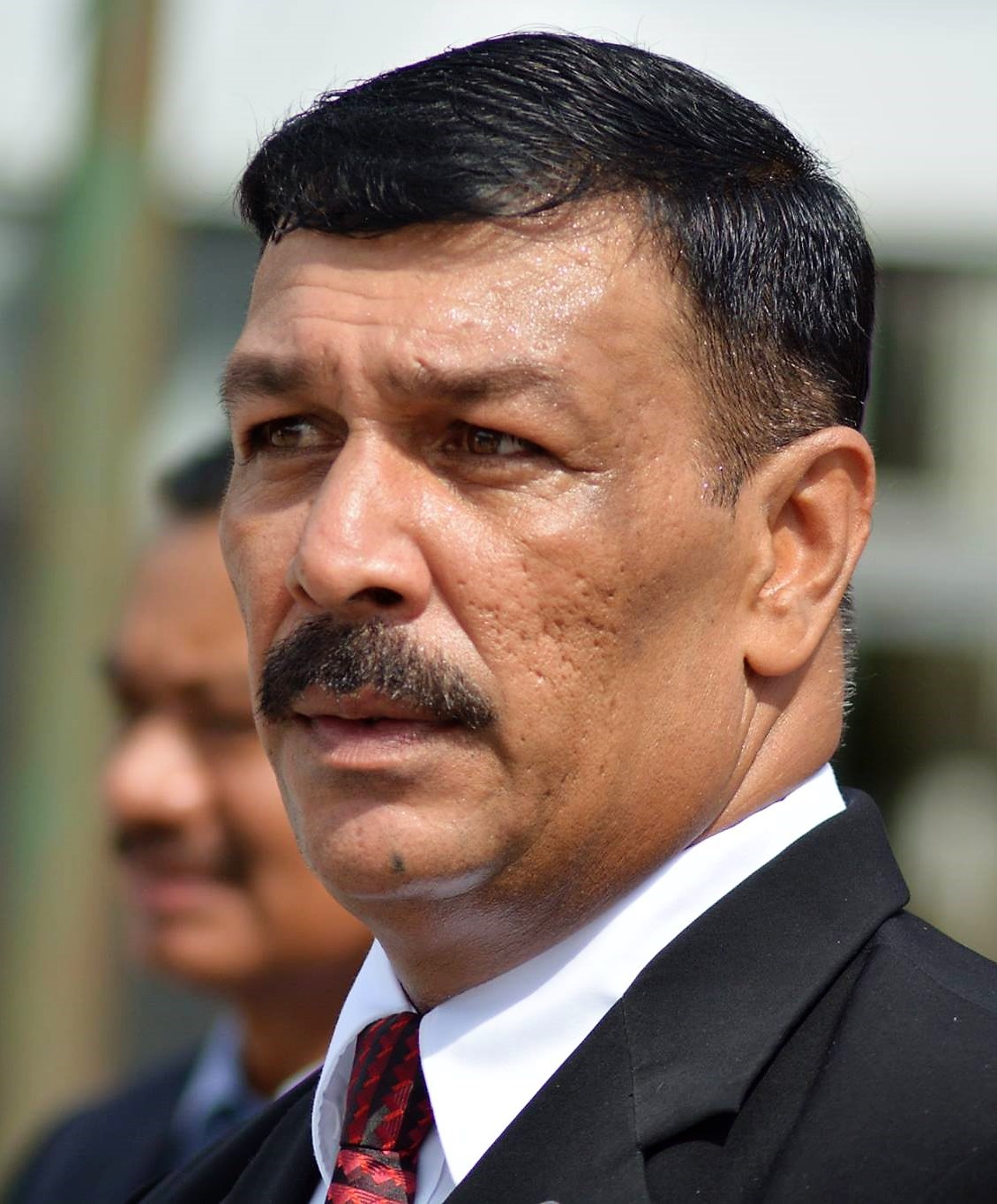
- Monteiro in 2017

Minister of the Interior
- In office 16 February 2015 – 15 September 2017
- Prime Minister: Rui Maria de Araújo
- Preceded by: Xanana Gusmão; (Minister of Defence and Security)
- Succeeded by: José Agostinho Sequeira; (Minister of Defence and Security)

Chief of the National Police of East Timor
- In office 27 March 2009 – 16 February 2015
- Succeeded by: Júlio Hornay

Attorney General of East Timor
- In office 16 October 2001 – 27 March 2009
- Preceded by: Office established
- Succeeded by: Ana Pessoa Pinto

Personal details
- Born: 20 December 1968 (age 57) Maliana, Bobonaro; Portuguese Timor (now East Timor)
- Children: 2 sons 1 daughter
- Education: University of National Education

Longuinhos Rabindranatha Tagore Domingues de Castro Monteiro (born 20 December 1968) is an East Timorese jurist, administrator and politician. He has held several positions in government, including that of Minister of the Interior in the VI Constitutional Government between 2015 and 2017.

== Early life ==
Monteiro was born in Maliana, Bobonaro, in the then Portuguese Timor. His father, Xavier Longuinhos Monteiro de Castro, was a medical doctor who had emigrated to Portuguese Timor from Caranzalem, Goa, in the then Portuguese India, in August 1958. His mother, Rosa Manuela Domingos, a Timorese of Portuguese origin, had met her future husband while working as a registered nurse.

After attending school in Dili until 1987, Morteiro studied law at the University of National Education (Indonesian: Universitas Pendidikan Nasional (UNDIKANS)), in Denpasar, Bali, Indonesia, from 1988 to 1994. At the end of his final year, he won the Paramitha Sadhuguna Nugraha award for best graduate.

While studying law, Monteiro was active in the clandestine student resistance movement against the Indonesian occupation of East Timor. During 1991, he lived with guerrilla fighters in the jungle; he also organised support for the resistance until the end of the occupation in 1999.

At one point, Monteiro considered joining the army, but was persuaded by his wife not to do so. He has said that he may eventually have become Vice General of the Army if he had ever joined it.

== Government career ==
Monteiro was part of the first group of lawyers hired by the United Nations Transitional Administration in East Timor (UNTAET) after it assumed control of the territory in 1999. On 7 January 2000, the United Nations representative in East Timor, Sérgio Vieira de Mello, installed Monteiro as an investigating magistrate. From June to October 2001, Monteiro also held the position of Deputy Attorney General for Common Crimes.

On 16 October 2001, Monteiro was appointed as the inaugural Attorney General of East Timor. In that capacity, he also collaborated with the Indonesia–Timor Leste Commission of Truth and Friendship, which was tasked with investigating the crimes committed during the 1999 crisis in East Timor. In July 2006, the then President of East Timor, Xanana Gusmão, appointed him to a second term as Attorney General.

By then, Monteiro had become involved in a complex legal dispute with an East Timorese businessman, Francisco Lui (also known as Aquileong).

Following an incident in November 2004 when Monteiro and two other prosecutors forced Lui to give them IDR 279,000,800, Lui made a complaint to the National Police of East Timor (PNTL) about the incident, and registered the complaint as a criminal case. That case was held up, and on 23 August 2005 Lui delivered to Monteiro a summons commencing a civil case against Monteiro making similar allegations. Two days later, on 25 August 2005, the newspaper Diario Tempo published a story about the civil case entitled "Three Prosecutors Engage in Corruption, Money US$8,600". Based on that story, Monteiro commenced both criminal and civil proceedings accusing Lui of defaming him.

The criminal defamation case could not proceed in the Dili District Court, as Monteiro was the Attorney General. The District Court petitioned the Appeal Court to hear the criminal defamation case, but it too was then held up. Meanwhile, the civil defamation case proceeded to a hearing. On 21 January 2009, the Dili District Court determined that the civil defamation case was not proved, and freed Lui from the accusation of defamation. It also ordered Monteiro to pay the costs of the civil case totalling 10% of the value demanded (US$50,000) or US$5,000.

Soon afterwards, on 27 March 2009, Monteiro relinquished his position as Attorney General to Ana Pessoa Pinto, and, controversially, was appointed as chief of the PNTL. One critic of the appointment, Luis de Oliveira Sampaio, executive director of Judicial System Monitoring Programme, a non-governmental organisation, stated that "We would prefer the commander to come from inside the institution ...". Another critic, Arsenio Bano, an Opposition member of the National Parliament, made a similar statement, and also claimed that Monteiro had "... not performed very well ..." as Attorney General.

Monteiro is credited with having introduced various norms and standard operating procedures while serving as chief of the PNTL.

On 16 February 2015, as part of a comprehensive government reshuffle, Monteiro was sworn in as Minister of the Interior in the VI Constitutional Government of East Timor. He was replaced as chief of the PNTL by Júlio Hornay. It was the first time an East Timorese administrative official had ever been asked to assume a ministerial position; Monteiro did so as a political independent. His ministerial tenure ended on 15 September 2017, when the VII Constitutional Government took office.

== 2023 detention ==
On 16 January 2023, Monteiro's residence in Liquiçá was searched by criminal investigators who did not have the necessary search powers or any search warrant. They seized several weapons, and a quantity of ammunition. The following day, Monteiro was subjected to a first interrogation in Dili, and was detained, by the Scientific Police for Criminal Investigation (PCIC), for alleged possession of a prohibited weapon. On 18 January 2023, the Dili District Court ordered that Monteiro be released from detention, on the grounds that the search, interrogation and detention had been illegal.

Hours later, agents of the PCIC began a second search, under the authority of a court order. Additionally, the President of East Timor, José Ramos-Horta, reacted to the detention by sending a message to Lusa, a Portuguese news agency, stating that "Some gentlemen claim for themselves powers that they don't have, and trample all the principles and values that guide democratic societies ..."

== Personal life ==
Monteiro is married with two sons. He and both of his sons have Indian Hindu middle names, as do his five brothers.

== Honours ==
Ribbon	Award	Date awarded	Notes
	Insignia of the Order of Timor-Leste	28 March 2012	
