= Kulu Hun shooting =

Killing of three men by a police officer in Dili

Tragedy of Kulu Hun
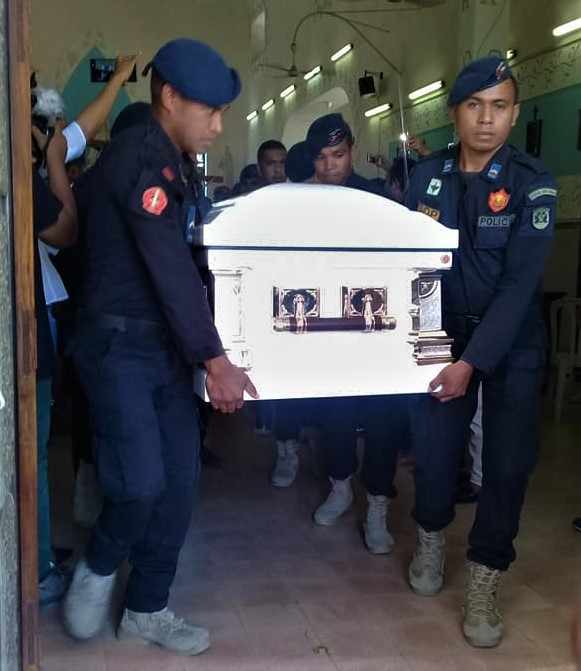
- Officers carrying the coffin of one of the men
- Location: Dili, East Timor
- Date: 18 November 2018
- Attack type: Mass shooting, police brutality
- Deaths: 3
- Injuries: 5
- Perpetrators: National Police officers José Mina and three officers known as FMS, AJS and AJT

The Kulu Hun shooting or better known as the tragedy of Kulu Hun was the killing of three young men at a party in Dili, Timor-Leste committed by an off-duty police officer José Mina in November 2018.

== Background ==
Police Brutality in Timor-Leste had been a major problem since Timor-Leste’s independence. In one incident a young man was killed by police in Bebonuk, Dili. One young man was shot and wounded by a police officer in Praia dos Coqueiros.

There were also reported cases of brutality in Ainaro in 2017, Covalima in 2016, Hera in 2012, Delta Nova in 2009, and Viqueque in 2007.

== Shooting ==
In the early morning of 18 November 2018, José Mina and three other officers known by their initials, FMS, AJS and AJT who were all off-duty and were all intoxicated and were attending a kore metan hosted by a colleague of theirs.

Just after midnight two men started arguing, and the four plain clothes officers attempted to intervene however a power outage occurred, Mina then stood on a bench and began firing his service pistol into the darkness, killing three 18-year-old men Erick Joni Robertus Bria who was hit in the head, Leonildo "Leo" Eduardo Ximenes Sequeira who was hit in the chest, and Luis Quevin Saldanha Belo who was hit in the throat, all three men were killed instantly. Five others were seriously injured.

== Aftermath ==
On 27 March 2019 José Mina was sentenced to 25 years in prison and FMS was sentenced to 20 years.

The shooting sparked outrage at the National Police, and the day after the shooting protests erupted in Dili.

Further protests sprung up in 2021 after a fatal shooting on 5 June 2021, when a PNTL officer randomly shot at people in their homes in Lahane hitting Mateus “Amino” de Deus in the chest killing him instantly and mortally wounded his son Camilo de Deus who died later in hospital and critically injured their son-in-law.
