= Ministry of the Interior (Timor-Leste) =

Ministry in the government of Timor-Leste

- Ministério do Interior (Portuguese); Ministériu Interiór (Tetum)
- Coat of Arms of Timor-Leste

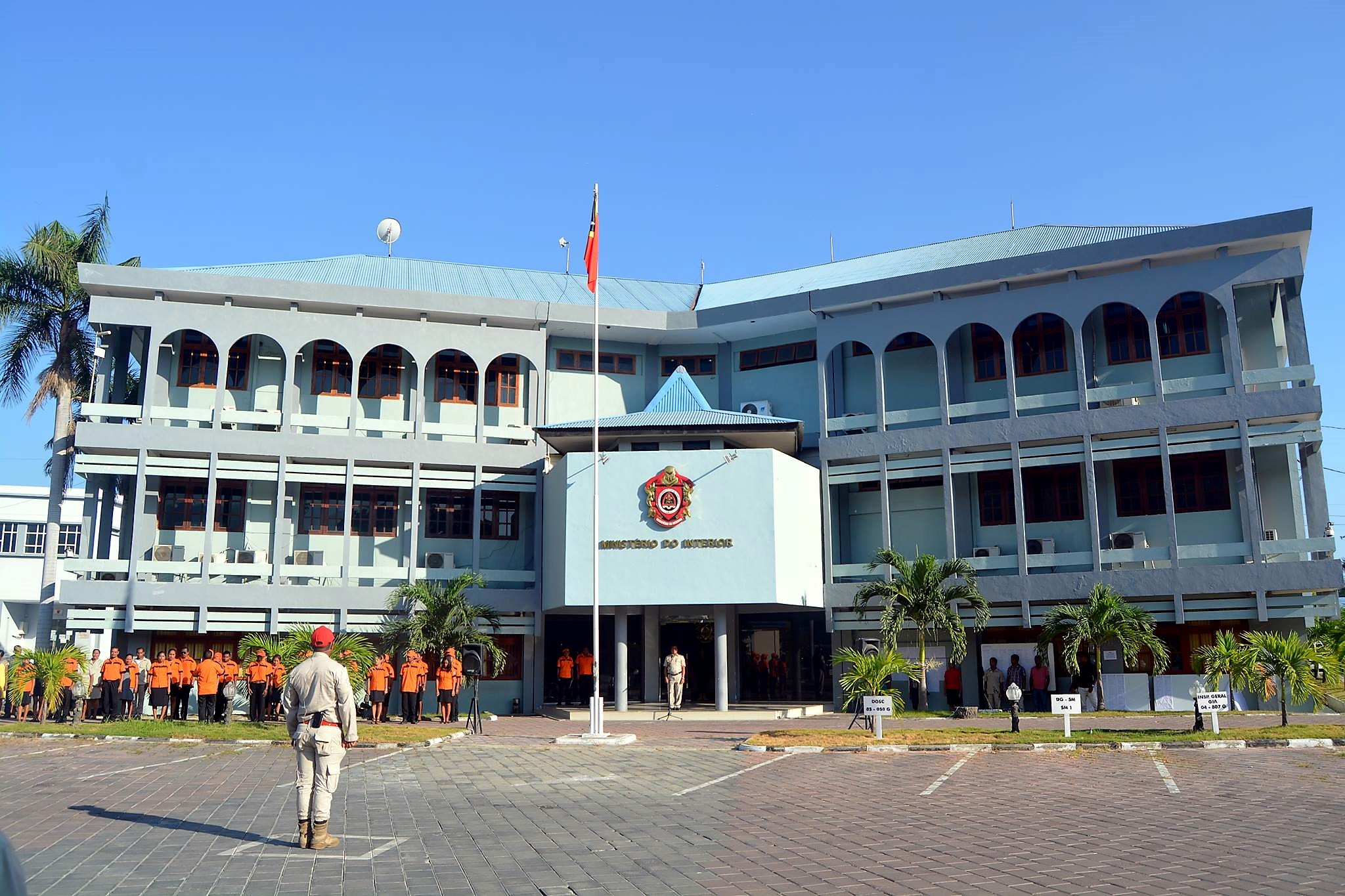
- The headquarters of the Ministry in 2017

Ministry overview
- Formed: 1975 / 2000
- Jurisdiction: Government of Timor-Leste
- Headquarters: Av. Vila Verde, Vila Verde, Dili; 8°33′37″S 125°34′18″E
- Minister responsible: Francisco da Costa Guterres, Minister of the Interior
- Website: Ministry of the Interior
- Agency ID: MI
- Ministry logo
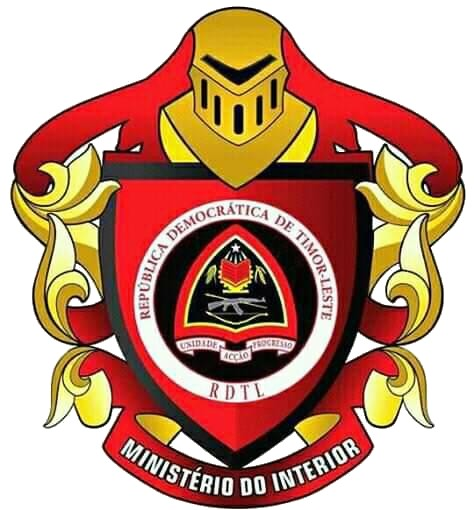

The Ministry of the Interior (MI; Portuguese: Ministério do Interior, Tetum: Ministériu Interiór) is the government department of Timor-Leste accountable for internal security and related matters.

== Functions ==
The Ministry is responsible for the design, implementation, coordination and evaluation of policies for the following areas:

- internal security;
- migration and asylum:
- border control;
- civil protection;
- road security; and
- police cooperation.

== Minister ==
The incumbent Minister of the Interior is Francisco da Costa Guterres.

== See also ==
- List of interior ministries
- Politics of Timor-Leste
