= Cherry Orchard, Dublin =

Cherry Orchard Gort na Silíní (Irish)
- Suburb
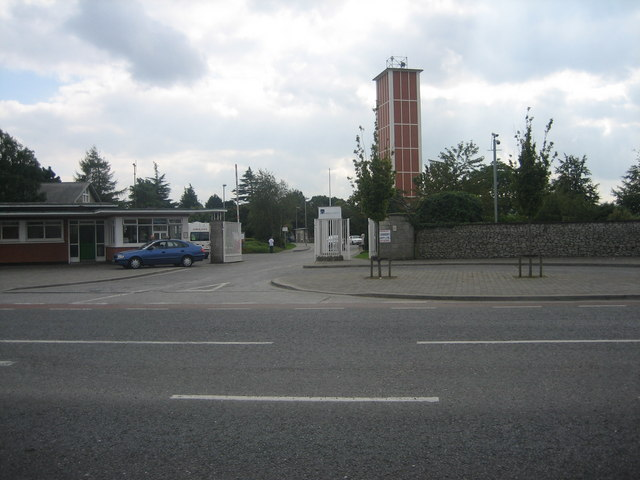
- Entrance to Cherry Orchard hospital, Ballyfermot
- Interactive map of Cherry Orchard
- Coordinates: 53.337°N 6.375°W
- Country: Ireland
- City: Dublin
- Elevation: 16 m (52 ft)

Population (2011)
  - Total: 7,976
- ("Cherry Orchard A" and "C" Electoral Divisions)
- Eircode routing key: D10, D22
- Area code: 01 (+3531)

Cherry Orchard (Irish: Gort na Silíní) is a townland and suburb of Dublin, Ireland. It is located near Ballyfermot, Inchicore, Drimnagh, Kilmainham, Palmerstown, Clondalkin and Lucan.

== History ==
=== Origins ===
Originally a largely rural area, Dublin City Council developed social housing in the Ballyfermot and Cherry Orchard areas from the mid-20th century. One of the first large developments in the area, Cherry Orchard Hospital, opened in 1953. Cherry Orchard F.C., a local association football (soccer) club, was formed in 1957.

The Roman Catholic parish church, the Church of the Holy Sacrament, opened in the mid-1980s. It is located on Cherry Orchard Avenue.

=== Society ===
During the 1980s and 1990s, drug dealing and joyriding was reported to be a concern in the area, including by a group sometimes known as the "Red Wall Gang". By 1995, the red wall around which they gathered was a major hub in Ireland's illegal drug trade. The gang were also known for their involvement in a Halloween riot in the area in 1995.

In September 2022, a Garda car was rammed during a joyriding incident. The Cherry Orchard Development Group was subsequently established to "co-ordinate and intensify support" for the local community.

=== Developments ===
Park West and Cherry Orchard railway station opened in 2008, replacing a former station dating from 1994.

In 2015, it was announced that a 10-point plan had been devised for Cherry Orchard and Park West which, if accepted, would inform future development in the area. Previous plans, devised in 2002, had stalled due to the economic downturn and the council subsequently proposed new plans to develop infrastructure and public transport. An updated Local Area Plan, covering Park West and Cherry Orchard, was adopted by Dublin City Council in October 2019.
