= Tom Hyland =

Irish human rights activist (1952–2024)

- Born: 12 October 1952; Ballyfermot, County Dublin, Republic of Ireland
- Died: 24 December 2024 (aged 72); Dili, East Timor
- Citizenship: Irish
- Occupation: Human rights activist

Tom Hyland (12 October 1952 – 24 December 2024) was an Irish human rights activist who campaigned for East Timor, which was occupied by Indonesia from 1975 to 1999.

== Career ==
Hyland was born in Ballyfermot to James and Elizabeth Hyland, natives of County Westmeath. Hyland lived most of his life in Ballyfermot, a suburb of Dublin. He was originally a bus driver for the CIÉ in Dublin. In 1992, he had just accepted a voluntary severance package and was unemployed. A little later, while he was playing cards with friends, Christopher Wenner's documentary In Cold Blood: The Massacre of East Timor about the Santa Cruz massacre of 1991, in which at least 271 people were murdered, 382 injured and another 270 "disappeared" without a trace, was playing in the background on a television set. Hyland initially wanted to concentrate on the card game and asked for the volume on the television to be turned down. But then he couldn't stop watching. And what he saw made him angry. The next day, he and a few friends launched the first major solidarity campaign for East Timor in Ireland, the East Timor Ireland Solidarity Campaign (ETISC). They began to put pressure on the Irish government to persuade Indonesia to withdraw from East Timor. Between 1992 and 1996 alone, there were 65 inquiries in Dáil Éireann about the situation in East Timor. The influence of the ETISC was particularly great during the left-wing coalition government from 1995 to 1997, and through the EU Council Presidency in the second half of 1996, it brought the East Timor conflict onto the agenda of the European Union, against the resistance of the governments of the United Kingdom and Germany.

In 1993, the then Prime Minister of Australia Paul Keating visited Ireland and learned about his ancestors, who left Ireland in 1855, presumably due to expulsion. When he was invited to the state banquet in Dublin Castle, the ETISC organized a vigil in front of the castle and pointed out the parallels between Keating's ancestors and the expulsion of the people of East Timor. The vigil also drew attention to the Australian government's extensive military and economic support for Indonesia.

In 1997, Hyland visited East Timor for the first time under the Irish name Tomás Ó Haolain. He traveled to West Timor and from there overland to East Timor. However, when he was checked at the provincial border, he was recognized and greeted by an officer with "Welcome Mr. Hyland". He and his companion, journalist David Shanks, were observed by the Indonesian military throughout the visit.

When Irish Foreign Minister David Andrews visited occupied East Timor in April 1999 as the first foreign minister of the European Union, Hyland accompanied him on the trip. Ireland later participated in the UN peacekeeping force for East Timor. In 2000, Hyland returned to East Timor again. Hyland later became East Timor's honorary consul in Dublin, but lived in the country soon after East Timor's independence.

=== Illness and death ===
In 2019, Hyland went to Ireland for cancer treatment, but soon returned to East Timor. He died on 24 December 2024, at the Guido Valadares National Hospital in East Timor's capital city, Dili. Hyland was 72. President of Ireland Michael D. Higgins called Hyland one of "those extraordinary people who, after learning what was happening far away from Ireland, decided to take action on a humanitarian issue that could not be ignored." President of East Timor José Ramos-Horta wrote on Facebook: "Goodbye, Tom. We will always remember you. You joined Max [Stahl], who left us too soon. Both live on in our memories, in our stories."

Hyland was buried in Dili's Becusi Cemetery. The funeral ceremony was attended by President Ramos-Horta, Foreign Minister Bendito Freitas, Education Minister Dulce Soares and other personalities.

== Awards ==
The University of Limerick awarded Hyland an honorary doctorate on 24 February 2003. In recognition of his services, the ETISC received the Order of Timor-Leste from East Timor's then President Taur Matan Ruak in 2015. Internationally, ETISC, with its influence in Ireland and the European Union, was one of the most effective support groups for East Timor's independence.

In East Timor, Hyland was given the honorary name Malae Maubere. "Malae" means "foreigner", "Maubere" is a term for East Timorese, so the name roughly means "East Timorese from abroad".
