= Badr bin Saud al Busaidi =

Omani politician

Sayyid Badr bin Saud bin Harab Al Busaidi: بدر بن سعود بن حارب البوسعيدي
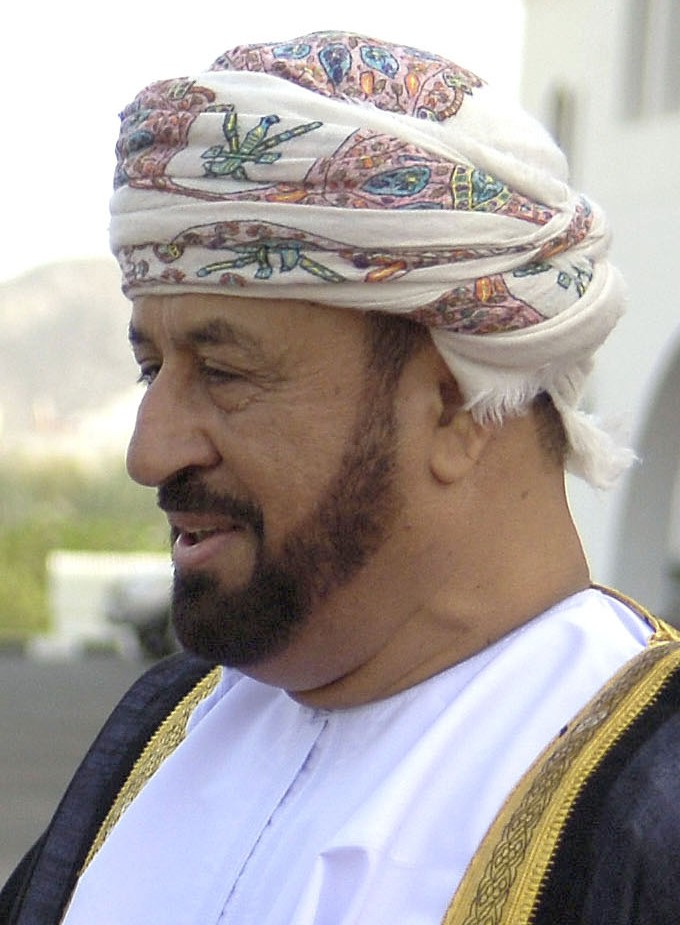
- Al Busaidi in 2008

Minister Responsible For Defence
- In office 1997–2020
- Monarchs: Qaboos bin Said; Haitham bin Tariq
- Prime Minister: Qaboos bin Said; Haitham bin Tariq
- Succeeded by: Shihab bin Tariq

Minister of the Interior
- In office 1979–1997
- Monarch: Qaboos bin Said
- Prime Minister: Qaboos bin Said
- Preceded by: Mohammed bin Ahmed al Busaidi
- Succeeded by: Saud bin Ibrahim al Busaidi

Personal details
- Died: 7 March 2023
- Parent: Saud bin Harab al Busaidi (father)

Sayyid Badr bin Saud bin Harab Al Busaidi (Arabic: بدر بن سعود بن حارب البوسعيدي; died 7 March 2023) was a member of the Omani royal family and a politician who served in the government for over 40 years including as the Minister of the Interior and the Minister Responsible For Defence.

== Family ==
His father, Saud bin Harab al Busaidi, was the governor of Ibri in the Al Dhahirah Governorate of Oman.

In 1978, his daughter, Na'emah bint Badr al Busaidiyah, married Asa'ad bin Tariq Al Said and had issue including Taimur bin Asa'ad Al Said. Asa'ad is the Deputy Prime Minister for Relations and International Cooperation Affairs and brother of Sultan Haitham bin Tariq.

== Career ==
Al Busaidi served as the ambassador of the Sultanate of Oman to the Arab Republic of Egypt and the Hashemite Kingdom of Jordan. In 1979, Sultan Qaboos bin Said appointed him as the Minister of the Interior. He held that position until 1997 when he was appointed as the Minister Responsible For Defence. He retired in 2020.

== Titles, styles, and honors ==
=== Titles and style ===
- His Excellency Sayyid Badr bin Saud bin Harab Al Busaidi

=== Foreign honors ===
- Japan
  - Member 2nd class of the Order of the Rising Sun.
