= Cherry Orchard Hospital =

- Health Service Executive
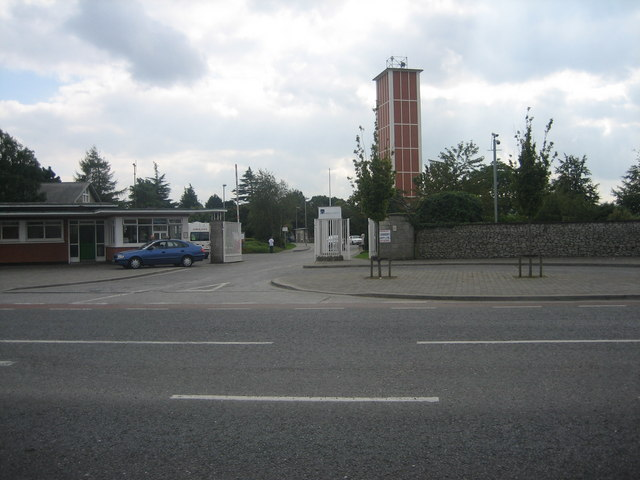
- Entrance to Cherry Orchard Hospital

- Shown in Dublin

Geography
- Location: Dublin, County Dublin, Ireland
- Coordinates: 53.34286°N 6.37741°W

Organisation
- Care system: HSE
- Type: General

History
- Founded: 1953

Cherry Orchard Hospital (Irish: Ospidéal Ghort na Silíní) is a public hospital in Ballyfermot, Dublin, Ireland.

== History ==
The hospital, which was commissioned to replace the aging Cork Street Fever Hospital, opened in November 1953. By the 1980s immunisation programmes had reduced the incidence of infectious diseases and the hospital expanded the range of medical services it provided to include psychiatric and rehabilitation services. After the government implemented cuts to services at the hospital in 2010, there were protests organised against Mary Harney, the Health Minister, on behalf of the Save Cherry Orchard Hospital Campaign. A new child and adolescent mental health facility opened at the hospital in 2013.

== Services ==
The hospital has a containment laboratory capable of testing for the deliberate release of the biological agent Bacillus anthracis.

== See also ==
- Cherry Orchard, Dublin
