= Hamoud bin Faisal al Busaidi =

Omani politician and businessman

Sayyid: Hamoud bin Faisal bin Said Al Busaidi; حمود بن فيصل بن سعيد البوسعيدي
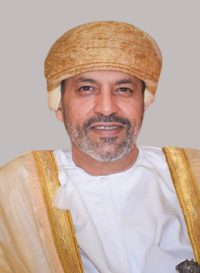
- Al Busaidi in 2010

Minister of Interior
- Incumbent
- Assumed office 2011
- Monarchs: Qaboos bin Said; Haitham bin Tariq
- Prime Minister: Qaboos bin Said; Haitham bin Tariq
- Preceded by: Badr bin Saud al Busaidi

Sayyid Hamoud bin Faisal bin Said Al Busaidi (Arabic: حمود بن فيصل بن سعيد البوسعيدي) is a member of the Omani royal family, politician and businessman. He is the Minister of Interior in the Sultanate of Oman since 2011.

== Career ==
In 2011, Al Busaidi was appointed as Minister of Civil Service.

Since 2011, he has served as Minister of Interior.
