= Ballyfermot =

Suburb of Dublin, Ireland

Ballyfermot Baile Formaid (Irish)
- Suburb
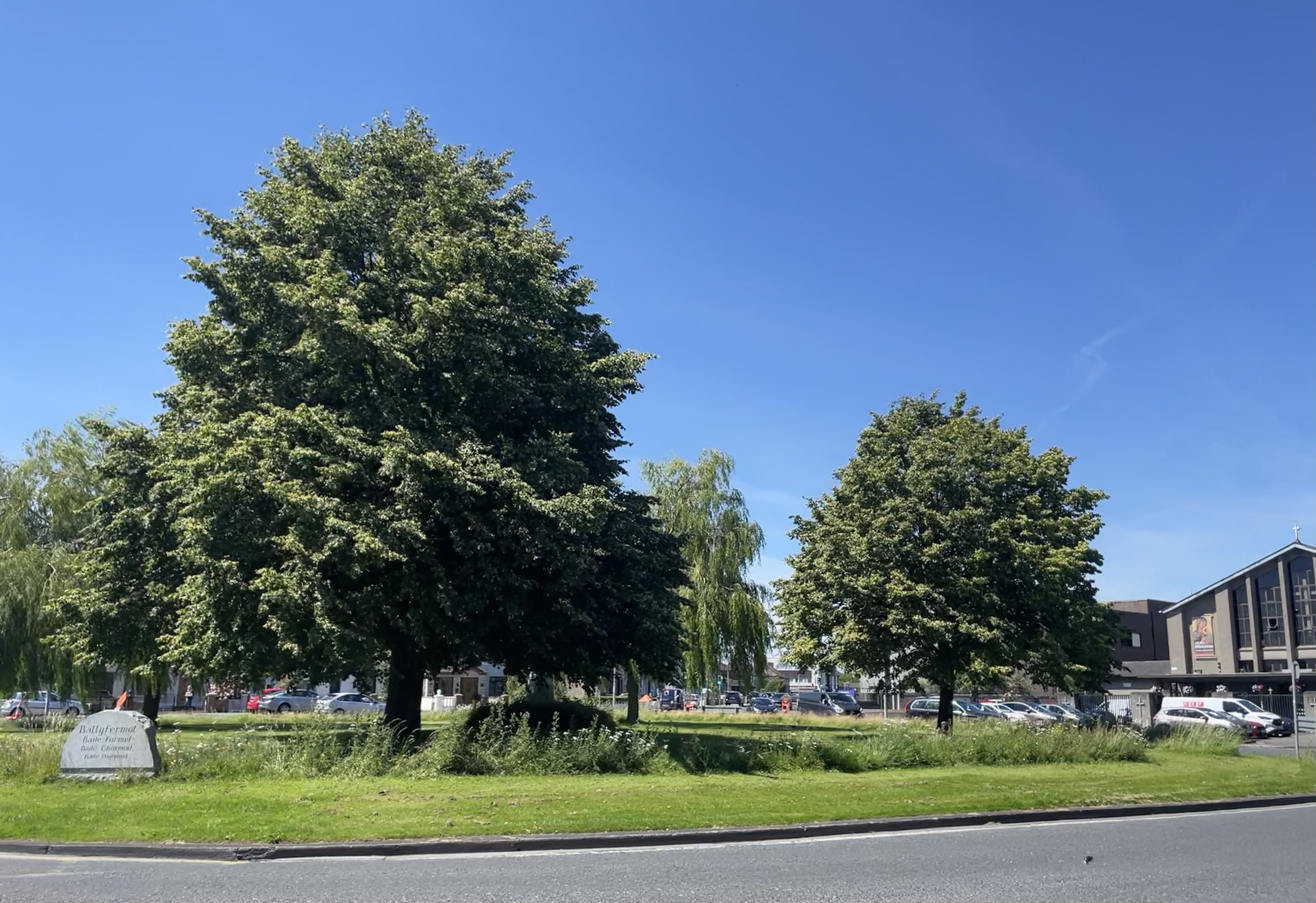
- Ballyfermot roundabout and church

- Location in Dublin Location in Ireland
- Coordinates: 53°20′32″N 6°20′55″W
- Country: Ireland
- Province: Leinster
- County (traditional): County Dublin
- City: Dublin (Dublin City Council)
- Council: Dublin City Council

Government
  - Dáil Éireann: Dublin South-Central

Population (2022)
  - Total: 50,013
- Time zone: UTC+0 (WET)
  - Summer (DST): UTC+1 (IST (WEST))
- Eircode routing key: D10

Ballyfermot (Irish: Baile Formaid) is a suburb of Dublin, Ireland. It is located seven kilometres (4.3 miles) west of the city centre, south of Phoenix Park. It is bordered by Chapelizod on the north, by Bluebell on the south, by Inchicore and Kilmainham on the east, and by Palmerstown and Cherry Orchard on the west. The River Liffey lies to the north, and the Grand Canal, now a recreational waterway, lies to the south of Ballyfermot. Ballyfermot lies within the postal district Dublin 10.

Ballyfermot is also a civil parish in the historical barony of Uppercross as well as the name of a town land in the area.

== Toponymy ==
The place name Ballyfermot—rendered in Irish Baile Formaid and sometimes Baile Thormaid—is derived from the Middle Irish baile ("farmstead"), and the Old Norse personal name Þormundr. It is also referred to colloquially by Dubliners as Ballyer for short.

== History ==
The 12th century saw the Cambro-Normans expand west across the Irish Sea from Pembroke in Wales into Leinster. After the Treaty of Windsor in 1175, through feudal land grants and intermarriage, the Cambro Norman knights came into possession of land in south and west Dublin, along with the local Irish chieftain who supported them, Mac Giolla Mocolmog. Family names associated with the area at this time included Mac Giolla Mocolmog (FitzDermot), O'Cathasaidhe, Fitzwilliam, Le Gros (Grace), O'Dualainghe, Tyrrell, O'Hennessy, O'Morchain, Dillon, O'Kelly, De Barneval (Barnewall), and Newcomyn (Newcomen).

In 1307, the manor of Ballyfermot was held by William Fitzwilliam and his wife Avice, who leased part of it to Thomas Cantock, the Lord Chancellor of Ireland. The land passed from the Fitzwilliams to their relatives, the Clahulls from Dundrum, and later to the Barnawalls of Drimnagh Castle.

Ballyfermot Castle was constructed on the site of a Norman motte and baily. Located northwest of the intersection of Le Fanu and Raheen Roads, it was the centre of the Upper (west) and Lower (east) Ballyfermot townships. Built in stone by Wolfram De Barneval in the fourteenth century, it was a stronghold against the O'Byrne and O'Toole families. These native Gaelic families had been discommoded from their original lands near Naas.

The castle was inherited by Robert Newcomen, who enhanced it and held it into the mid-seventeenth century. Its political importance subsequently declined with the Newcomens, culminating with the suicide of Thomas Gleadowe-Newcomen in 1825. It later housed a school. The castle defence wing to the south and east is reputed to have been destroyed by fire. Ballyfermot House, known locally as 'the tiled house', was built by the Verveer family. In his A Topographical Dictionary of Ireland, Samuel Lewis places a Captain Lampier and his wife Bridget (Cavanaugh of Goldenbridge) (Lieutenant Joseph Lamphier, 2nd Battalion, Royal Irish Fusiliers and Bridget Mary Cavanagh) as living there in 1834. It stood to the north of the castle's aquaculture pond. Built in the early eighteenth century, the house had a slated façade in the Dutch style.

The nineteenth century newspaper publisher and writer Joseph Sheridan Le Fanu, proprietor of the Dublin Evening Mail, lived in nearby Chapelizod when not in residence his city townhouse at Merrion Square. Ballyfermot and Chapelizod feature in his novel The House by the Churchyard and some of his other works. This large Georgian house still adjoins Church Lane next to St. Laurence's parish churchyard in Chapelizod. The eighteenth-century church, alongside the original medieval bell tower, is still in use. It serves the united parish of Ballyfermot, Palmerstown, and Chapelizod in the Church of Ireland. Le Fanu Road is named after him, as is Le Fanu Park, referred to locally as The Lawns. Le Fanu was a mentor of the writer Bram Stoker author of Dracula, who did the theatre reviews for his newspaper The Dublin Evening Mail.

A short distance from the castle site at the south-east end of Le Fanu Park is a mound which covers the ruins and churchyard of the rectory church of St Laurence. It is believed to have roots in Celtic Christianity, perhaps a minor branch of the Tallaght Maelruain or Kilnamanagh monasteries. It was connected to the Knights of St John of Jerusalem at Kilmainham in the 13th century. The churchyard ruins survived into the 1960s. This church served Ballyfermot and the surrounding townlands into the late 17th century.

Other manor houses of note include Johnstown House (St John's College), Colepark House, Sarsfield House, Sevenoaks, Floraville, Auburn Villa and Gallanstown House. The Ballyfermot townlands were transferred from the Barony of Newcastle to the Barony of Uppercross in the late nineteenth century, under the Local Government (Ireland) Act 1898 (61 & 62 Vict. c. 37).

The dairy and stud farms of Ballyfermot were acquired by the authorities in the 1930s. They were developed into suburban housing estates needed to alleviate the post war housing shortage. This development, along with estates at Drimnagh, Crumlin, Walkinstown and other pockets in the south city, and Cabra, Finglas and Donnycarney along with smaller pockets in the north city provided modern accommodation to facilitate the Dublin City Council public/private housing programs. Initially leased to waiting lists, these homes were sold to their residents, even prior to similar government initiatives in the United Kingdom. The first estate was built in the late 1940s at Ballyfermot Lower. South of Sarsfield House and Ballyfermot Road it was originally called the Sarsfield Estate. The street names reflect this historical theme. Gradually, the adjacent townlands to the south of Ballyfermot Road and north of Grange Cross - Ballyfermot Upper, Blackditch, Cherry Orchard, Raheen and Gallanstown were similarly developed. Johnstown, a townland of Palmerstown, located around Johnstown House (St John's College De La Salle) south of Chapelizod was developed for residential housing. Now divided along the Drumfin/Glenaulin/Sports Park perimeter, the west portion was retained by Palmerstown, while the east portion became the township/electoral district of Drumfin in Dublin City (Local Government Act 1993), and included in postal district Dublin 10.

During the 1970s Ballyfermot suffered from a lack of facilities and opportunities for its residents; however, these conditions have improved over time.

== Politics ==
In local government elections, Ballyfermot is part of the Ballyfermot-Drimnagh Ward. Since the local elections in 2024, the local elected representatives on Dublin City Council are:

- Vincent Jackson (Independent)
- Philip Sutcliffe Snr. (Independent (Note: Sutcliffe was elected as a member of Independent Ireland, but left the party in November 2024.))
- Hazel de Nortúin (People Before Profit)
- Ray Cunningham (Green Party)
- Daithí Doolan (Sinn Féin)

Ballyfermot is part of the Dublin South-Central Dáil constituency.

== Commerce ==
The area is now a centre of national commercial distribution, with access to the national trunk roads. Ballyfermot is bordered to the north by the N4, to the south by the N7 and to the west by the M50.

A number of Irish motor distributors are based in Ballyfermot. They include Toyota, Nissan, General Motors, J. C. Bamford (JCB), Harris Assembly and Hilux. They are centred around Kylemore Road, home to companies such as Thornton's Recycling, Britvic Ireland, and FBD Insurance. The industrial estates include Park West and JFK.

There are several hotels surrounding the area, including Aspect Hotel at Park West and Maldron Hotel at Newlands Cross. A community based CCTV monitoring scheme for Ballyfermot was launched in early 2003. This is part of the Department of Justice Town Centre CCTV monitoring initiative.

== Transport ==
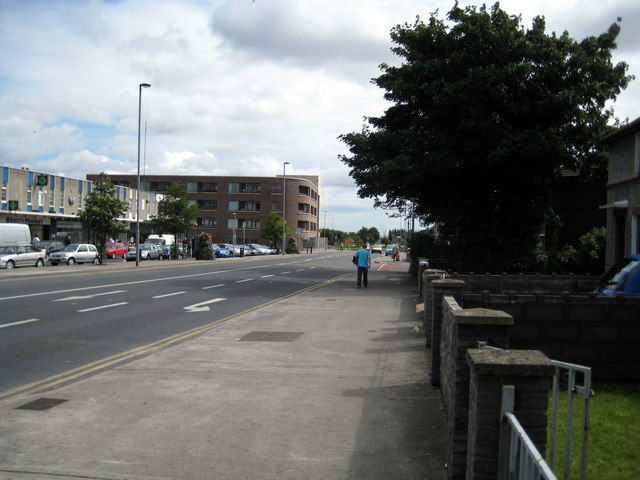
The main Ballyfermot Road, towards the direction of Dublin city centre.

Dublin Bus (routes G1, G2, 60) and Go-Ahead Ireland (routes L55, S4, W2) serve the area. An hourly commuter train service is offered by Irish Rail, to Heuston station at Kingsbridge. The local station is Cherry Orchard/Park West Station, which is located on the Park West Road on the western perimeter of Ballyfermot. The Luas light rail system also serves Ballyfermot. The south side stop is near the Kylemore and Naas Road intersection. A Luas line to Lucan proposes passing through the centre of Ballyfermot village before going on to serve Liffey Valley and Lucan village.

== Amenities ==
=== Parks ===
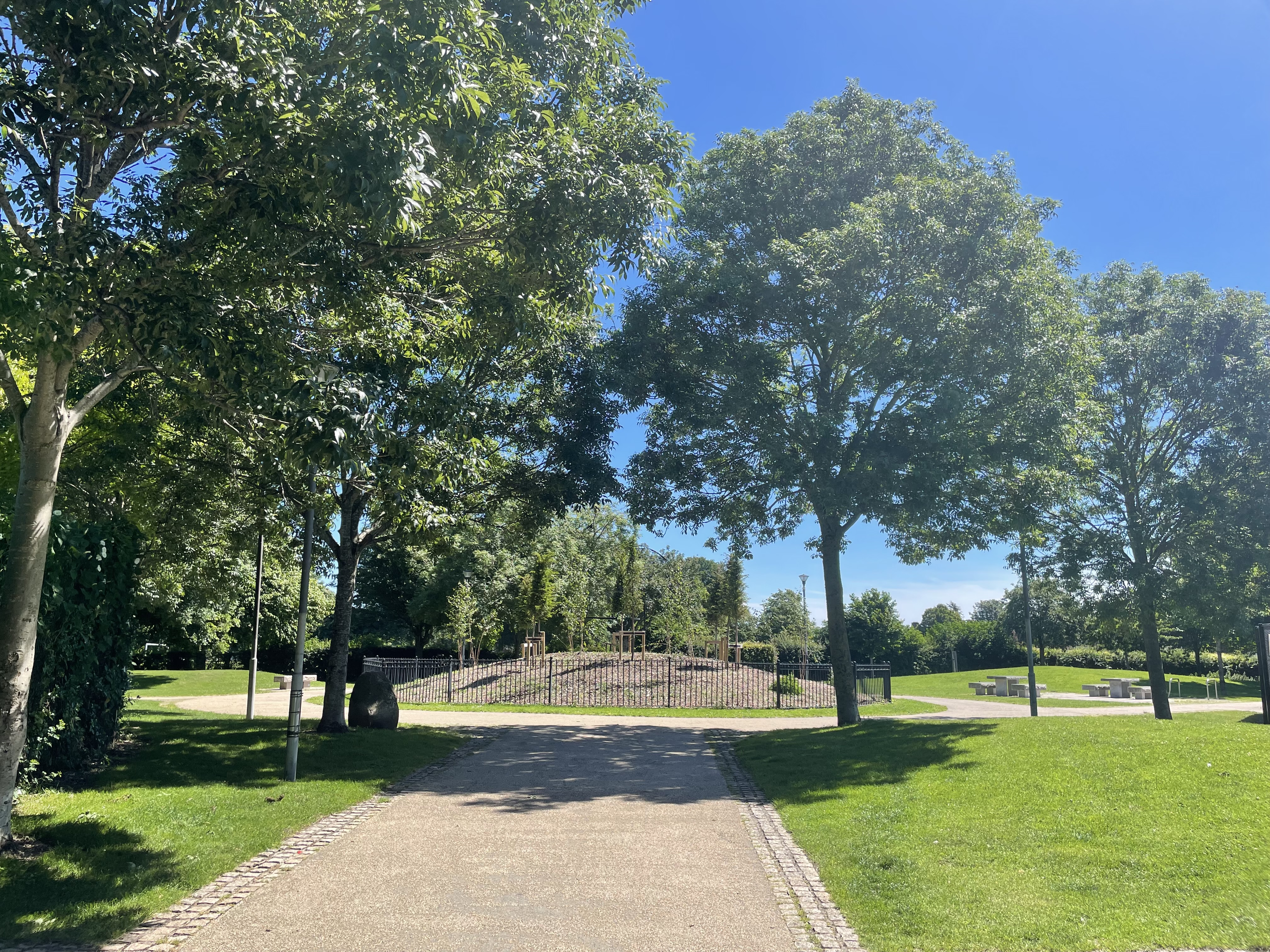
Markievicz Park

The California Hills Park (also known as Glenaulin Park) is the largest recreational space in the area. The name originated as a colloquialism - there were few designated play facilities in the very early days of suburban development and the California Hills was the name used by local movie-going kids who played 'Cowboys and Indians' there. The name later achieved official recognition due to popular usage. The park covers part of the great esker west of Dublin, and overlooks the Liffey Valley from the south. From Le Fanu and Kylemore Roads to the east, it falls to the landscaped valley of a Liffey tributary, the Glenaulin Stream. It runs west toward Glenaulin and Drumfin Roads which adjoin the park as it stretches in a crescent through Palmerstown. The Chapelizod Bypass runs northwest alongside and Kylemore Road joins the motorway near the West County Hotel. California Hills Park has views north over the Strawberry Beds to the Phoenix Park and the Farmleigh clock tower at Castleknock is a prominent landmark. California Hills include's Gales-Drumfinn Avenue Park, known locally as "The Gaels", used for football, golf practice, cross country runs and walks and includes a children's play area. There is an entrance to the park beside the Ballyfermot Leisure Co-Op, near the GAA Sports Park, on Gurteen Road.

The Irish National War Memorial, Memorial Gardens and Park, designed by Sir Edwin Lutyens, are accessible from the Sarsfield Road via East Timor Park (also referred to by locals as "The Gaels" due to the local GAA club which is attached to the park).

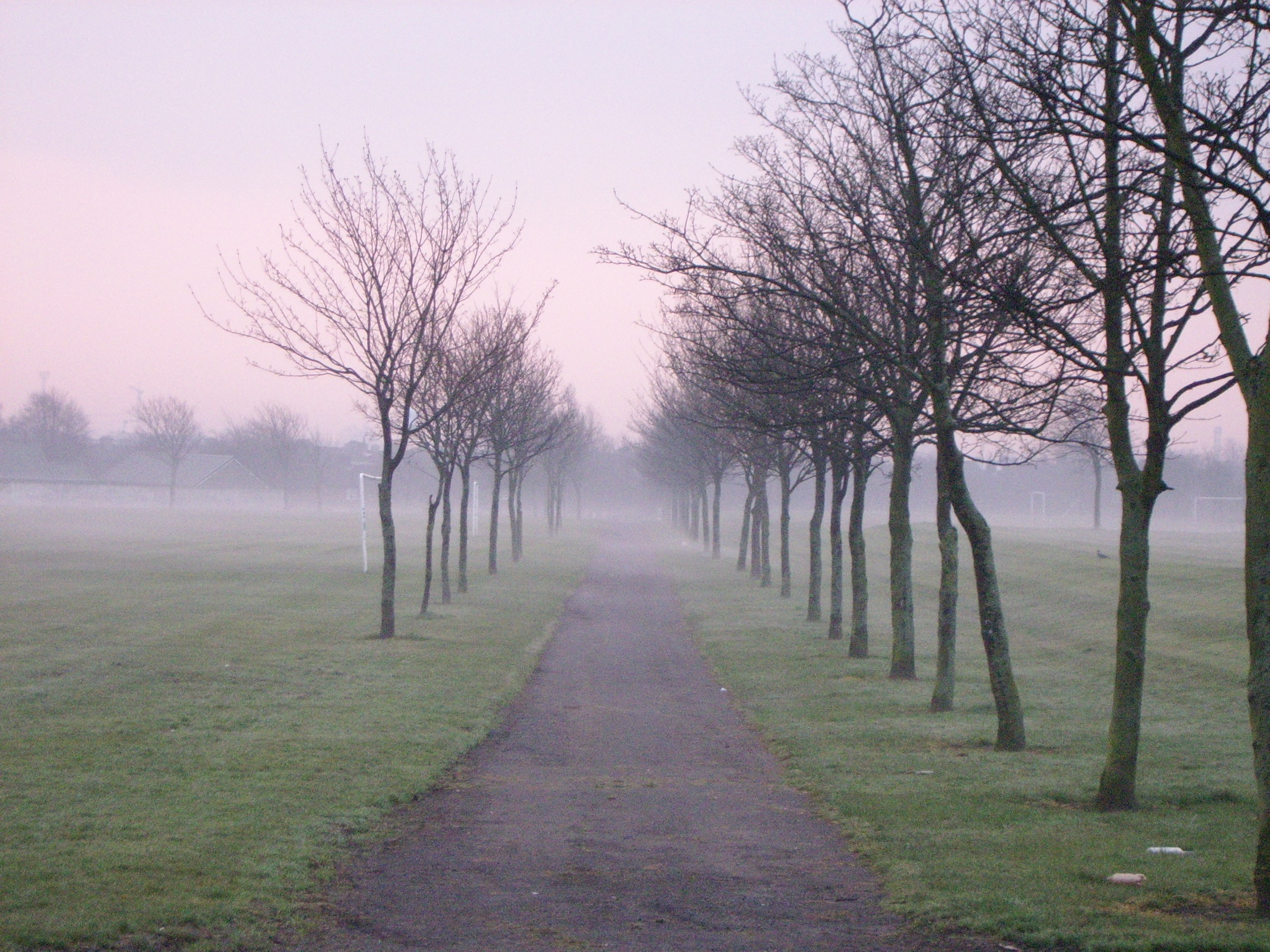
Le Fanu Park

Other parks located in the area include Le Fanu Park, Glenaulin Sports Park, Markievicz Park and Cherry Orchard Park. Le Fanu Park houses the Ballyfermot Leisure Centre and The Base.

=== Grand Canal ===
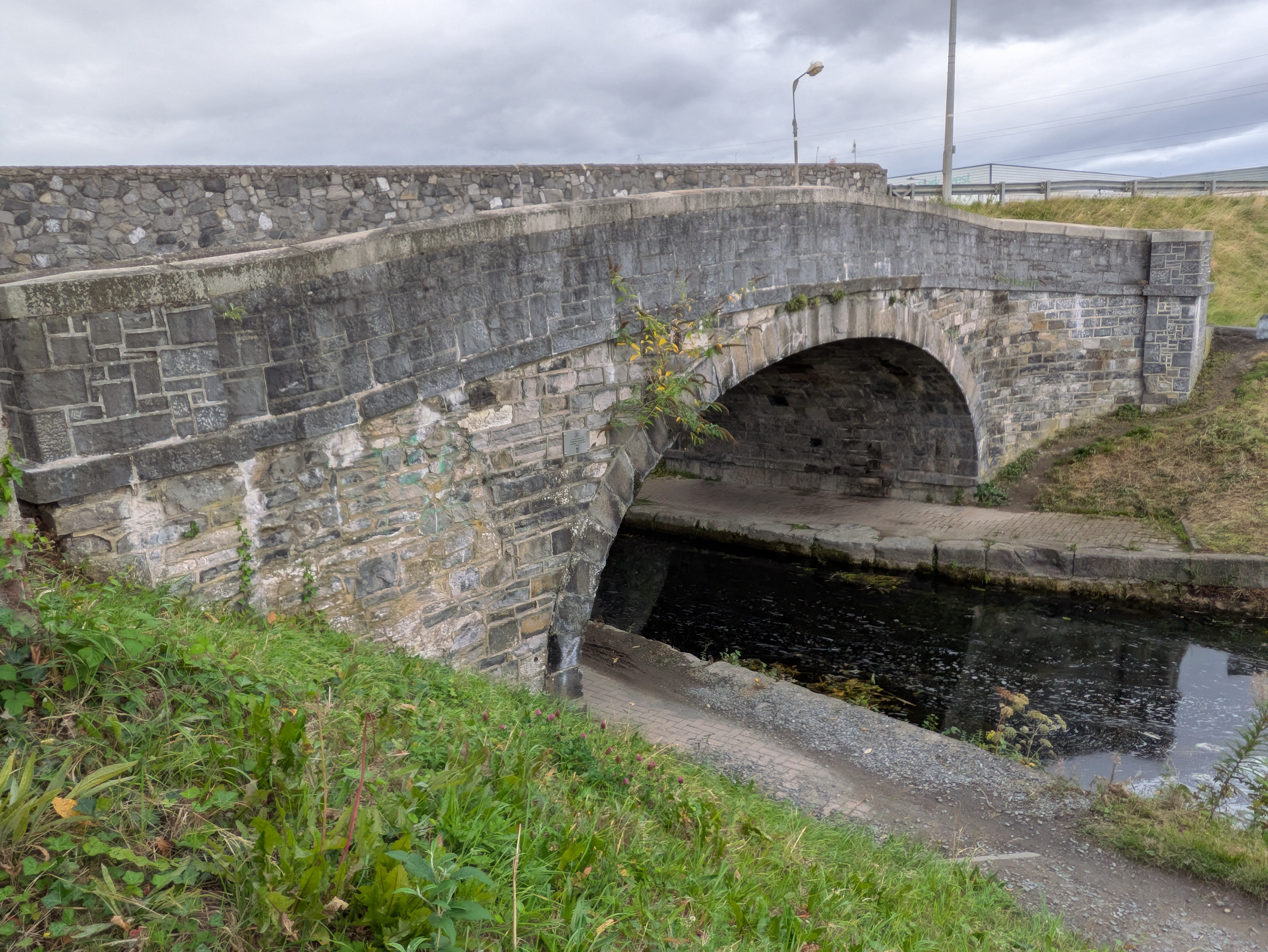
The Grand Canal runs along the southern border of Ballyfermot, separating the suburb from Bluebell and Park West.

The Grand Canal was constructed in the late eighteenth and early nineteenth centuries. It is now a recreational waterway. It passes along the south side of Ballyfermot. Towpath walkways extend continuously to Hazelhatch, County Kildare. A historic bridge crosses the canal near the seventh lock at Killeen.

=== Medical facilities ===
Cherry Orchard Hospital is a public health facility which has a containment laboratory capable of testing for the deliberate release of Bacillus anthracis.

The Ballyfermot Medical Clinic is closed but a new Primary Care and Mental Health Centre has been opened beside Cherry Orchard Hospital. Services include GP, community nursing, physiotherapy, dental, addiction and community welfare. Mental Health facilities include a day hospital, day centre and outpatients clinic. This is run by the HSE.

The Hermitage Medical Clinic is located in close proximity to the Liffey Valley Shopping Centre, just off the N4 motorway. The Hermitage Hospital is a 101-bed private facility with specialised medical teams who provide medical, surgical and advanced radiotherapy care to patients. The hospital is privately run. Its principal investors are Sean Mulryan, Larry Goodman, John Flynn and George Duffy GP.

=== Public institutions ===
Cloverhill Courthouse and Remand Centre is located between Clondalkin, Palmerstown, and Ballyfermot in Dublin 10. Wheatfield Prison is located on the same site adjacent to the Courthouse.

== Education ==
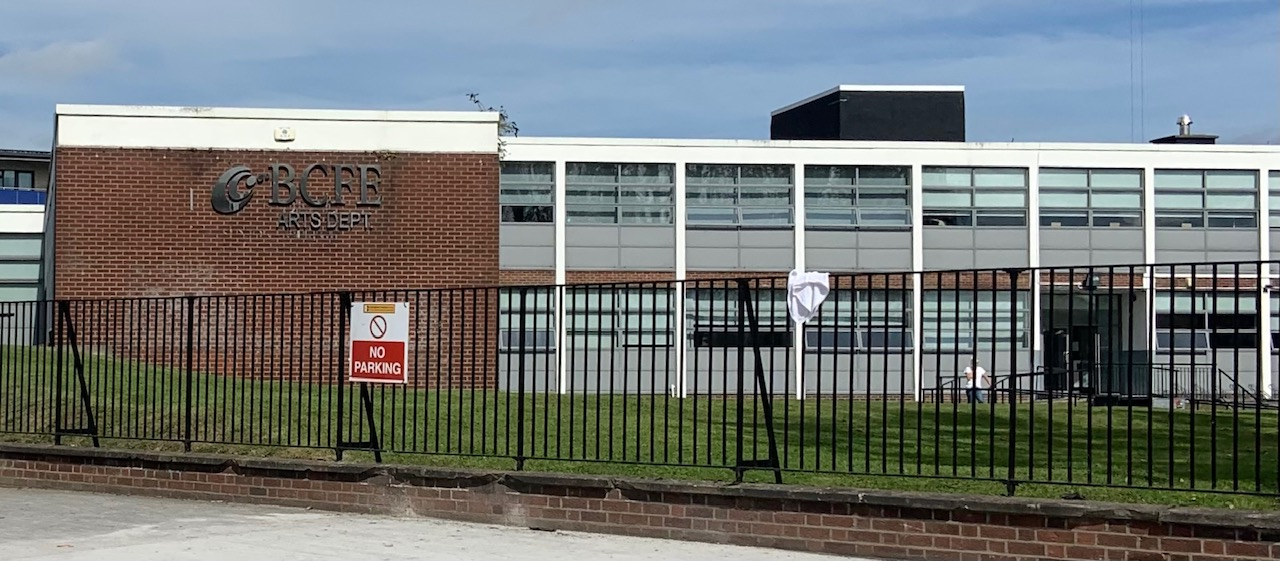
Ballyfermot College of Further Education - Arts Deptartment, Kylemore Road

National (primary) schools serving the area include Mary Queen of Angels National School, Mary Queen of angels 2, Junior & Senior National Schools, Dominican School Campus (which includes St Michael's, St Raphael's and St Gabriel's N.S.), and St Ultan's National School.

Due to the large amount of secondary schools in the area many merged into one which leaves Ballyfermot with two secondary schools: St Setons Secondary School and Kylemore College.

The merge between the secondary schools was necessitated due to a shortage of students between the schools.

Ballyfermot College of Further Education is a third-level institution based in the area. In 1989, Don Bluth Entertainment helped to found the college's animation department - graduates of which went on to work for the likes of Sullivan-Bluth, Fred Wolf Films and Emerald City Productions. In the 1990s, many graduates founded their own studios, including Oscar-nominated studios Brown Bag Films and Cartoon Saloon. In 2021, the animation school was ranked as the 18th best animation school in the world.

The animated TV series Roy is set in Ballyfermot, and Roy attends the fictional "Ballyfermot School". This show was produced by JAM Media, whose founders also attended Ballyfermot College of Further Education.

== Social and cultural ==
The Ballyfermot Community Festival takes place annually.

The local civic centre shares space with the Ballyfermot Residents Association (BRA). St Matthew's Community Centre is located adjacent to St Matthew's Church in Ballyfermot Upper (west). The is also a public library in Ballyfermot.

Ballyfermot Youth Service (BYS) is a youth service that has been running since 1985. It provides services to young people of the area including outdoor education programmes, drop-in information centres, and music and arts programmes. St Mary's Youth Club has also based in the area since 1958.

The Gala was a local auditorium until its closure in the 2010s. It was opened in 1953 and was used for several recreational uses, including as a local cinema, snooker and bingo hall.

== Demographics ==
On the outskirts of Ballyfermot and Bluebell, there is a relatively high Irish Traveller population, mostly located in the Labre Park area.

== Sport ==
=== Association football (soccer) ===
Cherry Orchard F.C. takes part in the FAI Cup soccer competition. Former players with the club include Andy Reid, William Flood, Alan Quinn and Glenn Whelan. Ballyfermot United FC shares the origins of Cherry Orchard FC. The Ballyfermot United FC Social Club is located close to Le Fanu Park. Other clubs include the Black Diamonds, Drummfin Celtic, C.I.E. Ranch, O.L.V, Clifden Celtic Orchard Celtic,Gala Rangers, Landen Utd and Markievicz Celtic. Professional football club St Patrick's Athletic, who play in the League of Ireland, are located in nearby Inchicore, and Ballyfermot has a large number of Saints fans.

=== GAA ===
There are two senior Gaelic Athletic Association clubs serving Ballyfermot. Ballyfermot De la Salle GAA Club is active primarily in Ballyfermot, while the Liffey Gaels GAA clubhouse is on the border between Ballyfermot and Inchicore and also serves the parish of Inchicore. Another GAA club was present in the 1990s under the name St. Laurences GAA, which later merged with nearby Quarryvalle GAA in Clondalkin.

Ballyfermot De La Salle is the largest Gaelic football club in the area. The club, which originated in 1953 as Ballyfermot Gaels, play their senior home games in the Drumfin/Glenaulin Sports Park, located on the west side of California Hills Park. The club plays in the California Hills and Markievicz Park areas as well as in Glenaulin Park. The club's colours are similar to that of Kerry, as a tribute to the first parish priest, Kerryman Charles Canon Troy, who sponsored the club.

Another club, Liffey Gaels, was founded in 1951. It was known as Rialto Gaels for over twenty years. In the 1970s, it changed its name to SS. Michael and James's to reflect the association with these schools. In 1984, a local juvenile club, Donore Iosagain, amalgamated with SS. Michael and James's and the club was renamed the Liffey Gaels. Today their immediate catchment area is Inchicore and the parishes of St Michael's, St James', St Catherine's, Rialto and Donore Avenue. The Gaels play their home games Liffeyside at East Timor Park on Sarsfield Road in Inchicore.

=== Boxing ===
St Matthew's Boxing Club is located on Drumfinn Road adjacent to the grounds of Mary Queen of Angels National School, close to Ballyfermot Garda Station. Cherry Orchard Boxing Club was founded by volunteers in 2012 to cope with the demand for the sport in the area after the summer Olympics. The club used facilities in the Orchard Community Center, Cherry Orchard Grove until a permanent home for the club was built with the help of Dublin City Council on the site.

=== Equestrian ===
Cherry Orchard Equine Centre is an equine, education and training centre that offers a number of services to the local area located at Cherry Orchard Green, Ballyfermot. One of the main services it provides is horse riding lessons for children and adults in the community. It was established in 2001 in response to children not attending school in order to tend to the horses kept in Ballyfermot. The problem of horses being kept in the Dublin suburb has spanned generations despite lack of proper facilities and horsemanship knowledge. This centre was established in order to combat this issue and provide people with the skills required to care for a horse.

== Religion ==
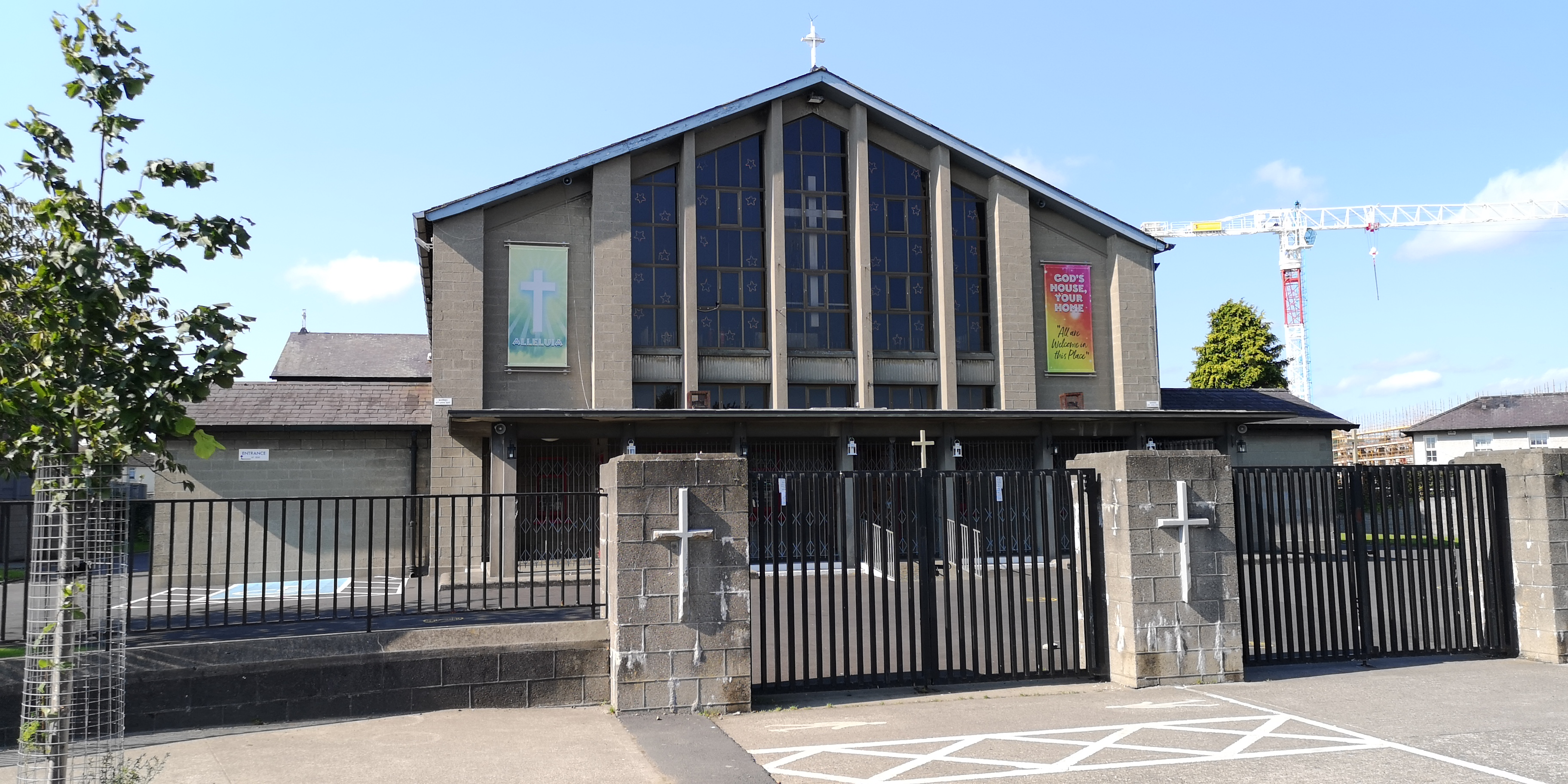
Church of Our Lady of the Assumption

Religious institutions serving the area include the Roman Catholic Church of Our Lady of the Assumption (sometimes shorted to 'Church of the Assumption') and the Church of St Matthew, St Laurence's Church, Chapelizod (Church of Ireland), and a number of Christian Evangelist denominations.

== Notable people ==
- Ian Bermingham, footballer with the all-time record appearances for St Patrick's Athletic
- Karen Byrne, professional dancer known for her appearances on Dancing with the Stars
- Mary Byrne, local singer; appeared on the British version of The X Factor in 2010
- Daithí de Róiste, politician from Ballyfermot; Lord Mayor of Dublin 2023-2024
- Joe Duffy, Irish broadcaster; was raised in Ballyfermot
- Willo Flood, former professional footballer, played for Manchester City and Celtic
- The Fureys, traditional Irish music family; grew up locally and began their professional career while living in Ballyfermot
- Jonny Hayes, Republic of Ireland international footballer, also played for Celtic
- Tom Hyland, human rights activist who campaigned for East Timor's independence
- Lorraine Keane, Irish broadcaster and journalist; studied broadcasting and journalism at Ballyfermot College
- Fiach Moriarty, singer-songwriter; grew up in the area
- Declan O'Rourke, Irish/Australian singer-songwriter; has family connections with Ballyfermot
- Liam Weldon, sean-nós singer and songwriter; born and grew up in the Liberties but lived for most of his life in Ballyfermot
