= Ministry of Defence (Oman) =

Omani government ministry

The Ministry of Defence (MOD) is the Omani government ministry responsible for defence policy and administration. Its responsibilities include implementing defence policy, procuring military equipment and modernising the Sultan's Armed Forces. The MOD was established in its current form in 1976 when the Directorate of Defence was renamed.

The Minister of Defence is Sultan Haitham bin Tariq.

== History ==
On 14 March 1976, Sultan Qaboos bin Said issued Royal Decree 6/76, renaming the Directorate of Defence the Ministry of Defence. The decree transferred all of the former directorate's responsibilities to the newly designated ministry and came into effect on 1 April 1976, the date of its publication. On 16 April 1988, Royal Decree 34/88 was enacted, establishing a revised legal framework for the ministry's responsibilities and organisational structure. The decree stipulated that the ministry would exercise its powers through its constituent units in line with the approved organisational structure.

The National Defence College was established within the remit of the Ministry of Defence by Royal Decree 2/2013 on 8 January 2013. Located at Bait Al Falaj Camp in Muscat, the College provides strategic security and defence studies education to senior military and civilian personnel. It was formally inaugurated on 11 December 2013.

On 9 March 2020, through Royal Decree 14/2020, Sultan Haitham bin Tariq appointed Sayyid Shihab bin Tariq Al Said as Deputy Prime Minister for Defence Affairs. This granted him the powers and responsibilities of the Minister of Defence under applicable laws and regulations.

On 15 May 2022, Royal Decree 27/2022 was issued to establish the Strategic and Defence Studies Academy under the remit of the Ministry of Defence. The National Defence College, the Joint Command and Staff College, and the Strategic and Defence Studies Centre were incorporated into the Academy. The Academy was granted legal personality, as well as financial and administrative independence.

== Responsibilities ==
The Ministry of Defence is responsible for implementing Oman's defence policy and supporting the operational capabilities of the Sultan's Armed Forces. Its responsibilities include defence planning, procuring and modernising military equipment, and concluding agreements relating to defence capabilities.

The ministry also oversees institutions involved in military education, training, and strategic studies.

== Leadership ==
Before the Ministry of Defence was established in 1976, British officers served as the Sultan's defence secretaries within Oman's defence administration. Brigadier Pat Waterfield held this position from 1958 until January 1970, when he was succeeded by Colonel Hugh Oldman. Oldman served until May 1973.

Sultan Qaboos bin Said was in charge of defence from 1972 until his death on 10 January 2020. Fahr bin Taimur al Said served as Deputy Minister of Defence from 1 May 1973 to 1979, and as Deputy Prime Minister for Security and Defence from 1976 until his death on 2 December 1996. Badr bin Saud bin Harib Al Busaidi was appointed Minister Responsible for Defence Affairs on 5 November 1996. He held this position until March 2020.

Following the death of Sultan Qaboos, Sultan Haitham bin Tariq took over the defence portfolio on 11 January 2020. On 9 March 2020, he appointed Shihab bin Tariq Al Said as Deputy Prime Minister for Defence Affairs, thereby granting him the powers and responsibilities of the Minister of Defence. Shihab has held this position ever since, being confirmed in office during the cabinet reshuffle on 12 January 2026.
