= Jean Baptiste Tine =

General Jean Baptiste Tine

Minister of the Interior and Public safety
- Incumbent
- Assumed office 5 April 2024
- President: Bassirou Diomaye Faye
- Preceded by: Mouhamadou Makhtar Cissé

Personal details
- Born: 1961 (age 64–65) Thiés

Military service
- Allegiance: Senegal
- Rank: General

Jean Baptiste Tine (born 4 September 1961) is a Senegalese military general and a politician who is currently serving as the Minister of Interior and Public security of Senegal.
