= Alarico Fernandes =

Timorese politician

Alarico Fernandes is a Timorese politician and independence activist. He was a member of FRETILIN National Committee in the mid-1970s. Still a politician, he has served as Minister of Defence. Mari Alkatiri once stated of him that he "didn't have an ideology".

== See also ==
- Timorese Democratic Union
