= Minister of the Interior (Timor-Leste) =

East Timorese government minister

- Ministro do Interior (Portuguese); Ministru Interiór (Tetum)
- Coat of Arms of Timor-Leste

- Flag of Timor-Leste

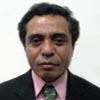
- Incumbent; Francisco da Costa Guterres since 1 July 2023
- Ministry of the Interior
- Style: Minister; (informal); His Excellency; (formal, diplomatic)
- Member of: Constitutional Government
- Reports to: Prime Minister
- Appointer: President of Timor-Leste (following proposal by the Prime Minister of Timor-Leste)
- Inaugural holder: Alarico Fernandes; (1975); Jean-Christian Cady; (2000)
- Formation: 1975 / 2000
- Website: Ministry of the Interior

The Minister of the Interior (Portuguese: Ministro do Interior, Tetum: Ministru Interiór) is a senior member of the Constitutional Government of Timor-Leste heading the Ministry of the Interior.

== Functions ==
Under the Constitution of Timor-Leste, the Minister has the power and the duty:

1. to implement the policy defined for the Ministry of the Interior;
2. to ensure relations between the Government and the other organs of the State in the area of responsibility of the Ministry.

Where the Minister is in charge of the subject matter of a government statute, the Minister is also required, together with the Prime Minister, to sign the statute.

== Incumbent ==
The incumbent Minister of the Interior is Francisco da Costa Guterres.

== List of ministers ==
The following individuals have been appointed as the minister:

No.	Party	Minister	Portrait	Title	Government (Prime Minister)	Term start	Term end	Term in office
1	Fretilin	Alarico Fernandes		Minister of Information, Home Affairs and Security	1975 CoM (Lobato)	1 December 1975	17 December 1975	16 days
2	United Nations	Jean-Christian Cady		Minister for Police and Emergency Services	I UNTAET (Vieira de Mello)	15 July 2000	20 September 2001	1 year, 67 days
3	Fretilin	Antoninho Bianco		Minister of Internal Administration	II UNTAET (Alkatiri)	20 September 2001	20 May 2002	242 days
4	Fretilin	Rogério Lobato		Minister of Internal Administration (to 4 March 2003); Minister of Interior (from 6 March 2003)	I Constitutional (Alkatiri)	20 May 2002	1 June 2006	4 years, 12 days
5	Independent	Alcino Baris		Minister of Interior	II Constitutional (Ramos-Horta)	10 July 2006	19 May 2007	1 year, 29 days
5	Independent	Alcino Baris		Minister of Interior	III Constitutional (da Silva)	19 May 2007	8 August 2007	1 year, 29 days
6	CNRT	Xanana Gusmão		Minister of Defense	IV Constitutional (Gusmão)	8 August 2007	8 August 2012	7 years, 192 days
6	CNRT	Xanana Gusmão		Minister of Defence and Security	V Constitutional (Gusmão)	8 August 2012	16 February 2015	7 years, 192 days
7	Independent	Longuinhos Monteiro		Minister of the Interior	VI Constitutional (Araújo)	16 February 2015	15 September 2017	2 years, 211 days
8	Fretilin	José Agostinho Sequeira		Minister of Defence and Security	VII Constitutional (Alkatiri)	3 October 2017	22 June 2018	262 days
(acting)	Independent	Filomeno da Paixão de Jesus		Minister of the Interior	VIII Constitutional (Ruak)	22 June 2018	24 June 2020	2 years, 2 days
9	PLP	Taur Matan Ruak		Minister of the Interior	VIII Constitutional (Ruak) (restructured)	24 June 2020	1 July 2023	3 years, 7 days
10	CNRT	Francisco da Costa Guterres		Minister of the Interior	IX Constitutional (Gusmão)	1 July 2023	Incumbent	3 years, 69 days
