= Ministry of Interior (Oman) =

Coordinates: 23°35′56″N 58°25′58″E

Sultanate of Oman Ministry of Interior
- وزارة الداخلية
- National emblem of Oman

Agency overview
- Jurisdiction: Government of Oman
- Headquarters: Muscat (Oman)
- Agency executive: Hamoud Bin Faisal Albusaidi, Minister
- Website: Official website

The Ministry of Interior is the governmental body in the Sultanate of Oman responsible for supervising administrative issues in the various Wilayat of the country, dealing with tribal issues, and overseeing the election process of the Shura Council.

== Former Senior Officers ==
- Ahmed bin Ibrahim bin Qais Al Busiaid - 1932 to 1970.
- Bader bin Saud bin Hamed Al Busaidi - 1970 to 1971.
- Sultan bin Hamoud bin Hamed Al Busaidi - 1971 to 1973.
- Hilal bin Hamed bin Sammar Al Busaidi - 1973 to 1974.
- Fahr bin Taimur Al Said - 1974 to 1976.
- Mohammed bin Ahmed Al Busaidi - 1976 to 1979.
- Badr bin Saud al Busaidi - 1979 to 1997.
- Ali bin Hamoud Al Busaidi - 1997 to 2001.
- Saud bin Ibrahim bin Saud Al Busaidi - 2001 to 2011.
- Hamoud bin Faisal al Busaidi - 2011 to day.
