= Becusi Cemetery =

- Cimitero Bekussi
- Interactive map of Becusi Cemetery

Details
- Location: Dili
- Country: East Timor
- Coordinates: 8.567601°S 125.599903°E

Becusi Cemetery in Dili is one of the largest cemeteries in East Timor. It is near Taibesi Market.

- Tom Hyland, human rights activist, was buried here in 2024.
