= Damehane Yark =

Togolese soldier and politician

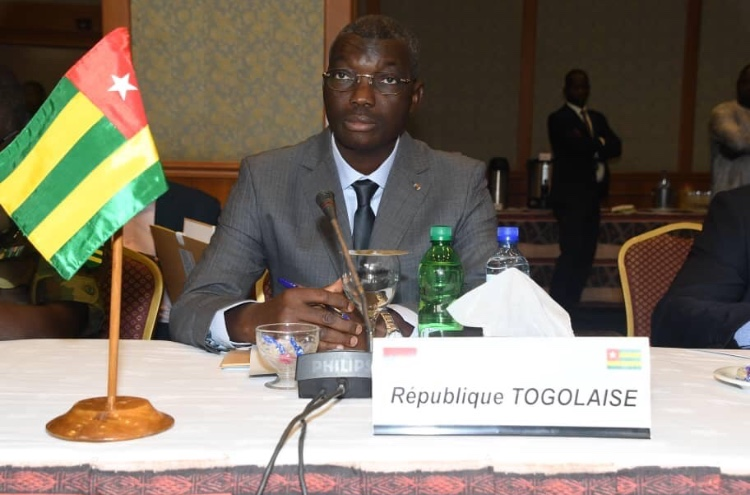

Chief of Staff to the President of the Council of Ministers of Togo
- Incumbent
- Assumed office 13 October 2025
- President: Faure Gnassingbé

Minister of Fisheries, Animal Resources and the Regulation of Transhumance
- Incumbent
- Assumed office 20 August 2024
- President: Faure Gnassingbé

Minister of Security and Civil Protection
- In office July 2012 – 20 August 2024
- President: Faure Gnassingbé

Personal details
- Born: December 31, 1963 (age 62) Dapaong, Togo
- Occupation: Soldier, politician
- Awards: Commander of the Order of Mono (2017)

Military service
- Allegiance: Togo
- Branch/service: Armed Forces of Togo
- Rank: General

Damehane Yark (born December 31, 1963) is a Togolese soldier and politician. He was appointed Chief of Staff to the President of the Council of Ministers of Togo on 13 October 2025. He previously served as Minister of Security and Civil Protection and has played a role in Togo’s security sector.

== Early life ==
Damehane was born on December 31, 1963 in Dapaong, in the Savanes Region of Togo.

== Political career ==
In July 2012, Yark became Minister of Security and Civil Protection in Togo. As Minister of Security and Civil Protection in 2023, he succeeded in imposing the compulsory wearing of helmets for motorcycle users and passengers. The “Compulsory wearing of helmets by passengers” operation aims to reduce road accidents.

Yark became Minister of State, Minister of Water and Village Hydraulics of Togo in September 9, 2023.

On 20 August 2024, he was reappointed as Minister of Fisheries, Animal Resources and the Regulation of Transhumance in the government led by Victoire Tomégah-Dogbé.

He was appointed Minister Director of the Cabinet of the President of the Council, the in October 13, 2025.

== Honours ==
- Order of Mono – Commander (2017)
