= Francisco da Costa Guterres =

East Timorese politician

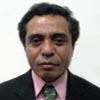

Minister of the Interior
- Incumbent
- Assumed office 1 July 2023
- Prime Minister: Xanana Gusmão
- Preceded by: Taur Matan Ruak

Secretary of State for Security
- In office 8 August 2007 – 8 August 2012
- Prime Minister: Xanana Gusmão
- Preceded by: Office established
- Succeeded by: Office abolished

Personal details
- Born: Francisco da Costa Guterres
- Party: National Congress for Timorese Reconstruction (CNRT)

Francisco da Costa Guterres is an East Timorese politician, and a member of the National Congress for Timorese Reconstruction (Portuguese: Congresso Nacional de Reconstrução de Timor, CNRT).

He is the incumbent Minister of the Interior, serving since July 2023 in the IX Constitutional Government of East Timor led by Prime Minister Xanana Gusmão.
