= List of monarchs of Timor =

This is a list of monarchs of Timor since the 17th century. Timor was traditionally divided into a large number of small kingdoms whose monarchs were variously known as liurais, rajas, regulos, na'i, etc. They were drawn into the colonial spheres of the Dutch East India Company and Portugal from the 17th century onwards. The succession of the individual kingdoms is only partly known from the existing literature. After the achieving of Indonesian independence the kingdoms in West Timor were phased out and eventually abolished in about 1962. In Portuguese East Timor the kingdoms (reinos) lost much of their functions after 1912, although they have persisted as ritual domains until the present.

There were many chiefdoms on Timor, but according to the hierarchy among the Timorese domains, the ruler of Sonbai of West Timor, the ruler of Wehali of Central Timor, and the ruler of Likusaen (today: Liquiçá) of East Timor were three paramount rulers of Timor.

== Monarchs in West Timor ==
=== Kings of Amabi ===
- Sebastião (before 1652–1658)
- Saroro Neno (fl. 1655)
- Ama Kefi Meu (1666–1704)
- Ama Kefi (1704–1725) [son]
- Loti (1725–1732) [son]
- Nai Balas (1732–1755) [brother]
- Balthazar Loti (1755–1791) [son of Loti]
- Osu I (1791–1795) [son]
- Slolo (1795-c. 1797) [son]
- Afu Balthazar (c. 1797-before 1824) [brother]
- Arnoldus Adriaan Karel Loti (before 1824–34) [son]
- Osu II (1834–1859) [brother]
- Mano (1860–1883) [nephew]
- Lelo (Nolus) (1884–1894) [son]
- Kusa (regent 1896–1901) [second cousin]
- Arnoldus (1901) [son of Lelo]
- Junus Amtaran (1901–1903) [of Amtaran family]
- Kase Kome (1903–1912) [nephew of Osu II]
- Jacob Ch. Kome (1912–1917; died 1976) [son]
- Amabi incorporated in Kupang 1917

=== Kings of Amakono (Miomaffo) ===
- Oenun Kono (Fahik Bere)
- Oenun Kono [son]
- Afoan Kono [son]
- Neno Kono [son]
- Sani Kono [son]
- Taenube Kono [son]
- Dom Francisco de Taynube (fl. 1702–04) [same as above?]
- Nai Taupah Kono (?-1722) [son of Taenube Kono]
- Takaip lord (early 18th century)
- Takaip lord (18th century) [son]
- Nai Takaip (?-1758) [son]
- Tessoy (1758–61) [brother]
- Usi Kenet (1761–64) [brother]
- Tetu Takaip (1764–65) [brother]
- Oenunu Amakono (1766-?) [son of Nai Taupah Kono]
- Manubait Lemon (c. 1800) [son]
- Nai Toh Kono (before 1832–1855?) [son]
- Oenunu Kono I (1879–1902) [son]
- Oenunu Kono II (1903–20) [son]
- Kefi Lelan (1920–34)
- Sobe Senak (1934–47) [great-grandson of Nai Toh Kono]
- Gaspar Afoan Kono (1947–62; died 1986) [son of Oenunu Kono II]

=== Kings of Amanatun ===
- Pedro (of Batumean fl. 1642)
- João (of Batumean fl. 1645)
- Don Louis Nai Konof (before 1751–1766)
- Don Joan Benao (1766-?) [son]
- Nai Taman (fl. 1832)
- Loit Banu Naek (?-c. 1899)
- Muti Banu Naek (1899–1915; died 1918) [son]
- Kusa Banu Naek (1916–1919) [second cousin of Loit]
- Kolo Banu Naek (1920–1946; died 1969) [son of Muti]
- Lodeweik Lourens Don Louis (1946–1962; died 1990) [cousin]

=== Kings of Amanuban ===
- Don Michel (before 1749–1751)
- Don Louis I (1751–1770) [brother]
- Don Jacobus Albertus (1770–1786) [son]
- Tubani (1786-c. 1807) [cousin]
- Don Louis II (c. 1807-c. 1824) [son]
- Baki (c. 1824–1862) [son]
- Sanu (1862–1879) [son]
- Bil Nope (c. 1870–1910) [son]
- Noni Nope (1910–1920) [brother]
- Pae Nope (1920–1946; died 1959) [son]
- Paulus Nope (1946–1949; died 1959) [son]
- Kusa Nope (1949–1962) [brother]

=== Kings of Amarasi ===
- António I (?-1665)
- Dom Thomas (1665-?) [brother]
- N.N. (fl. 1679) [son or nephew]
- Dom António II (fl. 1688–1695)
- Dom Augusto Fernandes (fl. 1697–1703)
- Dom Affonço (fl. 1703)
- Nai Soti (fl. 1714)
- Dom Luís Hornay (Esu) (before 1749–1751)
- Dom Afonço Hornay (Ruatefu) (1751–1774) [son]
- Don Rote Ruatefu (1774–1802) [son]
- Kiri Lote (1803-before 1832) [son]
- Muni (before 1832) [probably son]
- Koro Kefi (before 1832–1853) [brother]
- Obe Koro (1853–1871) [nephew]
- Rasi Koroh (1872–1887) [grandson of Obe Koro]
- Taku Obe (1888–1891) [son of Obe Koro]
- Rasi Koroh (1892–1914) (2nd time)
- Isaac Koroh (1914–1923) [brother]
- Alexander Koroh (1923–1925; died 1944) [grandson of Rasi Koroh]
- Hendrik Arnold Koroh (1925–1951) [brother]
- Viktor Koroh (1951–1962; died 1990) [son]

=== Kings of Amfoang ===
- Nai Toas (1683-after 1698)
- Am Fo’an (?-1708)
- Dom Manuel (1708–1718) [son]
- Daniel (1718–1748) [uncle]
- Bartolomeus I (1748–1776) [son]
- Daniel Bartolomeus (1776–1783) [son]
- Bartolomeus II Nai Toas (1783–1795) [brother]
- Babneno (1795-?)
- Jacob Bartolomeus (1800–1802)
- Bartholomeus III (1802–1806)
- Jacob Bartolomeus (1806–?) [brother]
- Abi Aunoni (fl. 1829)
- Manoh Aunoni (fl. 1832)
- Neno (c. 1830s)
- Fini Manoh Aunoni (before 1845–1850)
- Willem Bartolomeus Manoh (1850–1858) [nephew]
- Willem Sanu Aunoni (1858–1880) [son of Fini Aunoni]
- Anna Elisabeth Aunoni (1881–1902) [granddaughter]
- Willem Tafin Talnoni (1902–1914) [alleged uncle]
- Soleman Willem Talnoni (1915–1921) [son]
- Adreanus Talnoni (1922) [brother]
- Mutis Oil Amanit (1923–1930)
- Semuel Oil Amanit (1930–1943) [brother]
- Willem Oil Amanit (1943–1948; died 1996) [son of Mutis Oil Amanit]
- Semuel Oil Amanit (1948–1962, 2nd time)

=== Kings of Amfoang–Sorbian ===
- Nai Manubait (?-1697)
- Mano Nassa (fl. 1728)
- Taiboko (before 1749)
- Dom Bernardo da Costa (before 1749–1753) [son]
- Tusala Taiboko (1753–1779) [brother]
- Talnoni Forisa (1779–1808?) [son]
- Muti Afo’an
- Pupu Afo’an [brother]
- Nobel Afo’an (?-c.1824) [son]
- Masu Taiboko (Usi Molo) (fl. 1829) [son]
- Willem Manoh (before 1844–1854)
- No-Feie (1854–57) [nephew]
- Molo Mano (1857–75) [putative son of Usi Molo]
- Willem Mano (1875–1885) [son]
- Baki Mano (1898–1909) [great-grandson of Muti Afo’an]
- Incorporated in Amfoan 1910

=== King of Belu (Tasifeto) ===
- Josef Sirimain da Costa (1916–1923) [of Jenilu]
- Incorporated in Malaka-Belu 1924

=== Kings of Biboki ===
- Nai Tanesi (fl. 1761)
- Usi Taum Kenad
- Nesi Bokko [son]
- Tabesi Bokko [son]
- Nesi Tahoni [son]
- Usi Tehi (1854–?)
- Nesi Bokko (?-1916) [son of Nesi Tahoni]
- Tabesi Usi Ana Pah (1900–1904) [brother]
- Nesi Atau Kaha (Nesi Tahut Pah) (1905–1915) [nephew]
- Kau Mauk (1915–1940; died 1947) [descended from Usi Taum Kenad]
- Leonardus Taek Kau (1942–1962)

=== Kings of Dirma ===
- Nai Tasai (fl. 1761)
- Hane Tae (fl. 1765)
- Francisco Doutel (fl. 1786)
- Nai Tei Seran (1836–?)
- Neki (Kalau Nekin?) (1880–1904)
- Bau Nekin (1905–1916) [son of Kalau Nekin]
- Incorporated in Malaka 1916
- Fatin Nekin (fl. 1926–1934)
- Ramen Fatin
- Manek Fatin (?-1956) [brother]
- Ciprianus Ulu (1991–2005) [nephew]
- Herman Lam Nikin (2005–) [nephew]

=== Kings of Fatuleu ===
- Christoffel Thaiboko (1912–1930) [son of Nai Fai Thaiboko of Takaip]
- Nicolaas Nisnoni (1930–1942; died 1952) [from Sonba'i Kecil]
- Alfonsus Nisnoni (1942–1945; died 1992) [son]
- Hans Nisnoni (1945–1955; died 1983) [brother]

=== Kings of Fialaran ===
- Dom António Hornay (fl. 1726–1731)
- Dom Joaquim Hornay de Matos (fl. 1764–1786)
- Dom Manuel Ignacio Boquete (fl. 1815)
- Don Carel Taek (c. 1815–1858)
- Atok Mauk (1858–1903) [nephew]
- Atok Samara Loro (1904–1916) [grandnephew]
- Incorporated in Belu Tasi Feto 1916

=== Kings of Funai ===
- Lafu I (1749-after 1767)
- Jacob Liskoen (fl. 1797–1806)
- Kolo (fl. 1805) [son of Lafu I.]
- Lelo (fl. 1832) [brother]
- Lafu II (1840–1873) [grandson of Lafu I]
- Toh Liskoen (1874–?) [great-grandson of Lafu I]
- Kolan Funai (1888–1906) [son of Lafu II]
- Kolan Laurens Funai (1906–1917) [grandson of Toh Liskoen]
- Incorporated in Kupang 1917

=== Kings of Insana ===
- Tana Mende (fl. 1761)
- Taku (fl. 1765)
- Malafu Neno
- Malafu Pa [son]
- Malafu Tasaeb (1880–1901) [son]
- Usi Nila (Nila Ela Taiboko) (1902–1914)
- Kahalasi Taolin (1915–1934)
- Tasaeb Malafu (1934–1936) [great-grandson of Malafu Tasaeb]
- Afu Tasaeb (1936–1938) [son]
- Dominicus Taolin (1938–1940; died 1974) [son of Kahalesi Taolin]
- Petrus Atolan Tasaeb (1940–1942; died 1989) [grandson of Tasaeb Malafu]
- Lorencius Taolin (1942–1962) [brother of Dominicus Taolin]

=== Kings of Jenilu ===
- Dom Manuel de Jesus (fl. c. 1769)
- Dom Vicente de Jesus (fl. 1815)
- Serente Mor (fl. 1832)
- Raja Perempuan (c. 1845) [daughter of Raja Balibo]
- Besi Taik (1851–1879)
- Mariana Rosa da Costa (1879–1893) [daughter]
- Gabriel Perera (regent 1893–1902)
- Josef da Costa (Sirimain) (1902–1916) [son of Mariana Rosa da Costa]
- Incorporated in Belu Tasi Feto 1916

=== Kings of Kupang (Greater Kupang since 1917) ===
Sources:

- Ama Pono I (died 1619)
- Dom Duarte (fl. 1645)
- Ama Pono II (before 1649–1659) [grandson of Ama Pono I]
- Mauritius Ama Pot (1659–1660) [son]
- Ama Susang (regent-ruler 1660?–1698) [brother]
- Ama Besi (co-ruler 1660–1678)
- Pono Koi (1673–1691) [son of Ama Pono II]
- Ama Tomananu (1698–1731) [son]
- Buni (1732–1749) [grandson of Ama Besi]
- Karel Korang (1749–1760) [son]
- Lasi Tepak (1760–1770) [descended from Ama Pono II]
- Nai Manas (1770–1785) [son]
- Kolang Tepak (1785–1786) [uncle]
- Tepak Lasi (1786-c. 1795) [son of Lasi Tepak]
- Susang Manas (c. 1795-after 1803) [son of Nai Manas?]
- Lasi Kloman (before 1832–1858) [putative grandson of Lasi Tepak]
- Manas Dean (1858–1868) [grandson of Nai Manas?]
- Manas Kloman (1869–1889) [nephew of Lasi Kloman]
- Leo Manas (1890–1895) [son]
- Dean Manas (1895–1908) [brother]
- Soleman Pallo (1908–1911) [grandson of Susang Manas]
- Salmun Pallo (fettor [regent] 1911–1917) [son] – Incorporated in (Greater) Kupang kingdom 1917
- Daud Tanof (1918) [from Taebenu]
- Nicolaas Nisnoni (1918–1945) [of Sonba'i Kecil]
- Alfonsus Nisnoni (1945–1955) [son]
- Leopold Nicolaas Isu Nisnoni (1992–Present) [son]

Fettors in Kupang during Greater Kupang period

- Snait Dean (fettor 1917–1922) [son of Dean Manas]
- Martinus Pallo (fettor 1922–1938) [son of Soleman Pallo]
- Bui Dean or Benjamin Bissilissin (fettor 1938–1950) [son of Dean Manas]
- Christiaan Dean Bissilissin (fettor 1950–1962) [son]

=== Kings of Lakekun ===
- Bau Nahak
- Bano Lorok (early 19th century)
- Balok Lorok [daughter]
- Hoar Teti [daughter]
- Moru Lebok [son]
- Tahu Leki (?-1916) [nephew]
- Benediktus Leki Tahu (1916– 1980) [Tahu leki's son]
- Marselus Bere (1980–2011) [Tahu Leki ]
- Petrus Seran Tahuk (2011– sekarang) ( keponakan Marselus Bere Lakekun)

=== Kings of Lamaknen (Maere) ===
- Dom Miguel da Silva (fl. 1732)
- Dom Sebastião Carvalho (fl. 1737)
- Gaspar Ximenes Manuel da Costa (fl. 1766)
- Dom Pedro (fl. c. 1769)
- Dato Meno (fl. 1818–1832)
- Bee Siri Loi (1867–?)
- Serang Lae (1900–1904)
- Siri Loko (1905–1916) – Lamaknen merged into Belu Tasi Feto
- Loro Laku Malik (?-1950), titular
- Loro A.A. Bere Tallo (1950–2002), titular
- Loro Josef Kalimau (2003–), titular

Kings of Makir, in Lamaknen

- Bere Loi
- Be-Berre Lako (c. 1905–1916)
- Tes Bau, Leonardus Bele Leki (1916–1934), titular
- Paulus Uju Mor (1934–1961) [brother], titular
- Alfonsius A Bei Mone (1961–2001), titular

=== Kings of Lamassane ===
- Dom António Ferreira (fl. 1726)
- Dom Miguel Carvalho da Silva (fl. 1737)
- Dom João de Carvalho (fl. c. 1769)

=== Kings of Lanqueiro ===
- Furu Leki (Turlike) (fl. 1760–1765)
- Dom Felix (fl. c. 1769)

=== Kings of Lasiolat ===
- Suri Aton (fl. 1860)
- Josef Loro Berek (fl. 1884)
- Don Cajetanus da Costa (before 1894–1938) [son of Mariana da Costa of Jenilu]

=== Kings of Lidak ===
- Dom Gaspar Moniz (fl. c. 1769)
- Rino Mauk (fl. 1818)
- Nai Puwa (fl. 1832)
- N.N. (before 1852–1858)
- Moruk Huseriu (1858-c. 1878) [adopted]
- Alexander Rinu Mesak (c. 1878–1900) [adopted from Umaklaran]
- Petronella da Costa (1901–1913) [daughter]
- Incorporated in Belu Tasi Feto 1916

=== Fettors of Manubait ===
- Ammanubait (?-1712)
- Nube Manubait (fl. 1752)
- Akaie (fl. 1832)
- Nai Ote Kale (1861–1875)
- Tasi Bait (1876–1903)
- Nisnoni Feku Bait (1904–1905)
- Neno Bait (1905)
- Salla Bait (1908–1912)
- Manubait incorporated in Fatuleu 1912

=== Fettors and kings of Mollo ===
- Fettors at Mollo
  - Ifo Oematan
  - Toh Oematan [son]
  - Sani Oematan [son]
  - Nisnoni Oematan [son]
  - Neno Oematan [son]
  - Kono Oematan [son]
  - Tau Pah Oematan [son]
  - Toh Oematan [son]
  - Toh Tunbesi [son]
- Fettors at Netpala
  - Tabelak Oematan (fl. 1832) [son of Toh Tunbesi]
  - Toh Asupa Oematan [son]
  - Toh Kole Oematan (before 1845–1896) [brother]
  - Toh Oematan, Lukemtasa (1896–1912) [son]
- Fettors at Nunbena
  - Toh Oematan (fl. 1845) [son of Toh Tunbesi]
  - Kono Toh Oematan [son, or son of Toh Tunbesi]
  - Toh Hoe Nael (fl. 1861) [son]
  - Toh Hae Mnanu (?-c. 1879) [brother]
  - Toh Poi Oematan (c. 1879–99) [son]
  - Toh Aleka Musu (1901–05) [brother]
  - Baki Oematan (c. 1906) [son of Toh Poi]
  - Bai Oematan (c. 1906–15) [son of Toh Hoe Nael]
- Fettors at Besiana
  - Sopo Oematan (Tau Pak) (fl. 1832–45) [son of Toh Tunbesi]
  - Sau Oematan [son]
  - Baki Usaf Oematan (fl. 1861–76) [brother]
  - Kono Oematan before (1888–1900) [son]
  - Huku Oematan (1900–15) [brother]
- Monarchs of Mollo
  - Willem Frederik Hendrik Oematan (1916–1930; died 1937) [adopted by Lukemtasa]
  - Tua Sonba'i (1932–1959) [grandnephew of Nasu Mollo of Sonba'i Besar]

=== Kings of Naitimu ===
- Romorok (fl. 1761)
- Nai Mau (fl. 1832)
- Taik Mauk (1847–1878)
- Fahik (1879–1890)
- Kau Atok and Kau Besi (1890–1894) [sons]
- Don Basenti (1894–1914) [son of Mariana da Costa of Jenilu]
- Naitimu merged with Kakuluk Mesak 1914, then with Belu Tasi Feto 1916

=== Kings of Noimuti ===
- Manuel Fernandes (capitão fl. 1702)
- Richard Luis Sonba'i (18th century?) [son of a Sonba'i ruler]
- António da Costa (fl. 1761) [brother of Topass leader Gaspar da Costa I]
- Miguel de Sarayva (fl. 1766)
- Mateus da Costa (?-1890s) [son of Gaspar da Costa II of Oecussi]
- Domingos da Costa (1890s–1917; died 1941) [son]
- Noimuti incorporated in Amakono 1917

=== Kings of Seisal ===
- Caspar da Costa Correia (fl. 1928)
- Na’i João Correia (?-1949)
- Nai Cipriano da Silva Correia (1949–) [cousin; son of Caspar da Costa Correia]

=== Kings of Silawan ===
- Dom Cristóvão (fl. 1633)
- Nai Atok (1834-after 1870)
- Besin Mauk (1884–1900?)
- Datu Mauk (1900–1914) [probably son]
- Ani Berek (1914–1916)
- Silawan incorporated in Belu (Tasifeto) 1916

=== Emperors of Sonba'i Besar ===
- Nai Laban
- Nai Nati [son]
- Nai Faluk [son]
- Nai Lele Sonba'i [son]
- Ama Tuan I or Ama Utang (c. 1650-c. 1680) [presumed son]
- N.N. (c. 1680–1686) [son]
- Dom Afonso da Costa (fl. 1695)
- Dom Pedro Sonba'i or Tomenu (fl. 1704–1726) [grandson of Ama Tuan I]
- Dom Alfonso Salema or Nai Bau Sonbai I (before 1749–1752) [son]
- Don Bernardo (1752–1760) [son]
- Albertus Johannes Taffy or Nai Tafin Sonbai (1760–1768) [brother]
- Alphonsus Adrianus or Nai Kau Sonba'i (1768–1802) [son]
- Nai Sobe Sonba'i II (1808–1867) [son]
- Nai Bau Sonba'i II (1867-c. 1885) [son]
- Nai Nasu Mollo (1870–1885) [cousin]
- Nai Sobe Sonbai III (1885–1906) [son of Nai Sobe Sonba'i II]

=== Emperors of Sonba'i Kecil ===
- Ama Tuan II (1659–1672) [son of Ama Tuan I of Sonba'i Besar]
- Usi Tetu Utang (1672–1717) [daughter]
- Bernardus de Leeuw (1717–1726) [son of Dom Pedro of Sonba'i Besar]
- Corneo Leu (1728–1748) [brother]
- Daniel Tafin Leu (1748–1760) [brother]
- Jacobus Albertus Taffy (1760–1776) [son of Bernardus de Leeuw]
- Alphonsus Adrianus (1776–1782) [of Sonba'i Besar]
- Bernadus Nisnoni or Baki Bena (1776–1795) [so-called brother of Jacobus Albertus Taffy]
- Dirk Hendrik Aulasi (1795–1798) [son?]
- Pieter Nube or Nube Bena (1798–1821) [brother of Bernardus Nisnoni]
- Pieter Babakase (1821-c. 1825) [son]
- Isu Baki (1820s?) [son of Bernardus Nisnoni]
- Pieter Aulasi or Ote Nuben (c. 1825–1839) [grandson of Pieter Nube]
- Meis Nisnoni (1839–1860) [son of Pieter Babakase]
- Pieter Messi Nisnoni (1860–1874) [son]
- Bastian Isu Nisnoni (1875–1889) [brother]
- Sait Meis Nisnoni (1890–1902) [son]
- Baki Bastian Meis Nisnoni (1905–1911; died 1972) [brother]
- Nicolaas Isu Nisnoni (1911–1918, in Kupang 1918–1945; died 1952) [brother]
- Alfonsus Nisnoni (in Kupang 1945–1955; died 1992) [son]
- Leopold Nicolaas Isu Nisnoni (in Kupang, titular raja 1992–Present) [son]

=== Kings of Taebenu ===
- Tanof I (1688–1700)
- Amatabenu (1700-after 1709) [son]
- Tanof II (1700–1737) [son of Lasi Lelo]
- Tus Tanof (1737–1768) [son]
- Tanof III (1768-?) [son]
- Marcus Kobe Tanof (fl. 1746–1803) [uncle]
- Enus Kobe (fl. 1832) [son]
- Salolo Kobe (?-1841) [brother]
- Kobe Tus (1841–1850) [nephew]
- Hanoch Tanof I (Nobe Salolo) (1850–1873) [son of Salolo Kobe]
- Hanoch Tanof II (1874–1895) [son]
- Jacob Tanof (1896–1901) [son]
- Daud Tanof (1901–1917) [brother]
- Taebenu incorporated in Kupang 1917

=== Fettors of Takaip ===
- Nai Ballang (fl. 1832)
- Abnoni (?-1864)
- Foan (1864–?) [son]
- Nai Moni Taiboko (1871–1874)
- Baki Kooi (1874–1877)
- Baki Tuha (1877–1900) [son]
- Nai Fai Taiboko (1900–1912) [son of Nai Moni Taiboko]
- Takaip incorporated in Fatuleu 1912

=== Kings of Tiris-Mauta ===
- Dom Lourenço da Costa (fl. 1703)
- Dom Ventura da Costa (fl. 1741)

=== Kings of Tirilolo (Betulale) ===
- Belmiro Belo (the father,1890–1933)
- Manuel Mira Belo (Son of Belmiro Belo,1933–1956)
- Julio da Piedade Belo (Son of Belmiro Belo,1956–1981)
- David Lopes Belo (Son of Manuel M. Belo,1981–1999)

=== Monarchs of Wehali ===
Maromak Oan (Divine Sons) of Wehali

- Lakki Lorok
- Berek
- Halau Tuan
- Sera Berek Tuan
- Baria Korat
- Baria Fahuk Tuan
- Bere Klau [grandson of Baria Korat]
- Seran Berek [nephew]
- Barai Korak
- Baria Fahuk [nephew of Seran Berek]
- Baria Baek [nephew]
- Baria Nahak (before 1892–1925) [nephew]
- Seran Nahak (1925–1930; died 1970) [nephew]
  - Wehali incorporated in Malaka 1916, in Belu 1930

Liurais of Wehali

- Unnamed Queen (c. 1732)
- Dom Jacinto Correia (c. 1756–1757)
- António de Melo (c. 1767)
- Dom Alesu Fernandes (c. 1800)
- Unnamed Queen (c. 1814)
- Loro Ramaë (c. 1832)
- Nai Tei (?–1858)

=== Kings of Wewiku ===
- Nai Liu (fl. 1756)
- Don Alvare de Loja (fl. 1761)
- Louis Perera (regent fl. 1765)
- Anthony Perera (fl. 1767)
- Loro Mamas (fl. 1832)
- Nahak Maroe Rai (Nahak Metan) (?-1906) [son of Bei Nai Bria]
- Nai Kalau Serang Badak (c. 1908–16)
- Wewiku incorporated in Malaka 1916

== Monarchs in East Timor ==
These kingdoms existed in the territory of the present Democratic Republic of East Timor.

=== Kings of Aileu ===
- Dom Paulo da Costa (?-1873)
- Dom Paulo Mesquita de Oliveira (?-1940)
- Dom João Mendonça de Oliveira (fl. 1952–1964) [son]

=== Kings of Ainaro ===
- Nai Ceu (was a local Mambae king who reigned around the 18th century around the city of Ainaro, due to conflict with colonial the king was exiled to the mountain for decades, after a long time the first son of the Nai Ceu was appointed to rule again by the colonial but he refused to do that, for past several years they chose the new king named "Mau Meta" but it did not last long until the new king "Dom Aleixo Corte-Real" was chosen.
- Nai Cau (fl. 1912) [son of Tai-Mali from Suro]
- Dom Aleixo Corte-Real (c. 1912–1943) [second cousin]
- Dona Maria Amado de Jesus Corte-Real (1943–1960) [widow]

=== Kings of Alas ===
- Dom Miguel Tavares (fl. 1703–1726)
- Dom Miguel da Silva (fl. 1730–1731)
- Dom José Rodrigues Pereira(fl. 1760–1762)
- Dom Bernardo Pinto da Costa (fl. c. 1769)
- Dona Liberata da Costa (fl. 1815)
- Dona Guiomar da Costa Pinto (fl. 1854)
- Dom Bernardo Doutel Sarmento (fl. 1874)
- Dom Sebastião Macedo da Costa (fl. 1885)
- Dom Januário (?-1912)
- Dom Carlos Borromeu Duarte (1912–1945) [son of Dom José of Deribate]
- Dona Maria Borromeu Duarte (1945–1952) [widow; daughter of Dom Afonso of Bibissuço]
- Dom Januário da Costa Franco (1952–1973) [great-grandnephew of Dom José of Deribate]
- Dom José Borromeu Duarte (1974–1997) [son of Dom Carlos Borromeu Duarte]
- Carlos Boromeu Duarte (1997–1999) [nephew]
- Alexandrina Borromeu Duarte (2002–) [niece]

=== Kings of Ambeno ===
- Dom Pedro of Lifau (fl. 1641)
- Dom Paulo I of Lifau (?-1670)
- Dom Paulo II (before 1749–1761)
- Nai Sitenoni (fl. 1756–1762) [nephew]
- Nai Nobe Dom Paulo (1761-after 1764) [son or brother of Dom Paulo II]
- Dom Paulo III (before 1765-c. 1800) [presumably same as above]
- Dom Domingos Francisco da Cruz Hornay (fl. 1815–1829; in Citrana fl. 1832–1836) [son]
- Dom Paulo IV (fl. 1832)
- Dom Bernardo I (fl. 1851)
- Usi Toli (before 1870)
- Dom Pedro Paulo Hornay da Cruz (fl. 1879–1886)
- Dom Bernardo II (fl. 1896) [grandson of Domingos Francisco]
- Dom Carlos da Cruz (fl. 1903) [son of Dom Pedro Paulo]
- Dom Pedro de Tulicão (?-1909) [son of Dom Bernardo II]
- Dom João da Cruz Hornay (1909–1913) [son]
- Incorporated in Oecussi 1913

=== Kings of Atabae ===
- Dossi Lelo (fl. 1900)
- Regulo Bere Talo (fl. 1912)

=== Kings of Atsabe ===
- Dom Manuel (fl. 1761)
- Sama Lelo (fl. 1764-c. 1769)
- Dom António Hornay Boquete (fl. 1815)
- Dom Tomás Pinto (fl. 1854–1900)
- Nai Resi and Nai Sama [grandsons, contested power]
- Dom Cipriano Gonçalves (1912–1943) [son of Nai Resi]
- Dom Guilherme Maria Gonçalves (1943–1999) [son of Dom Cipriano]

=== Kings of Balibo ===
- Dom Lourenço (fl. 1703)
- Dom Caethano da Costa (fl. 1731)
- Ban Biti (fl. 1764)
- Dom João da Costa (fl. 1765)
- Dom José de Melo (fl. c. 1769)
- Dom Vicente da Costa (fl. 1815)
- Ute Kaptan (fl. 1832)
- Dom Francies da Costa (fl. 1854)
- Dona Maria Micaela Doutel da Costa (1871-after 1879)
- Samara Maubile (fl. 1899)
- Raul dos Santos (fl. 1952)
- Mendes (?-1999)

=== Kings of Barique ===
- Dom Lourenço Hornay (fl. c. 1769)
- Dom Christovão Pereira Hornay (fl. 1815)
- Dom Frederico dos Reis e Cunha (fl. 1854)
- Dom Hypolito dos Reis e Cunha Hornay (c. 1855-after 1899)
- Dom Marcos (fl. 1912)
- Tito dos Reis Cunha (before 1944 – after 1974)

=== Kings of Baucau ===
- Dom Manuel Caetano Delgado Ximenes (1884– after 1893)
- Dom Francisco da Costa Freitas (1899–1922) [Son of Dom Domingos da Costa Freitas of Vemasse]
- Tomás da Costa Soares (1922–1929) [brother-in-law]
- Nai Cipriano da Silva Correia (1981–1999) [son of Caspar da Costa Correia of Seisal]

=== Kings of Bebico ===
- Dona Marianna da Costa (fl. 1815)
- Dona Sebastiana dos Reis e Cunha (fl. 1854)
- Dom Domingos Manoel (fl. 1865)
- Dom Boaventura da Costa (fl. 1885)

=== Kings of Bercoly (Fatumarto) ===
- Dom Ukabai/Kutamori
- Dom/Tenente Coronel Antonio Laçumodo (Kutamori Bahalale)
- Sebastião Guterres (fl. 1854)
- Mateus de Sousa Fernandes (fl. 1872–1881)
- Soto Maior Cairiri
- Alexandre Fernandes de Rego (fl. 1884–1888)
- Alexandre de Sousa [same person?]
- Mariano de Sousa [son]
- Dom Mariano da Costa Freitas (fl. 1930–1931) [same person?]
- Chefe Juridiçao Fatumarto António Pacheco
- Encaregado, Carlos Ximenes da Costa (fl. 1934) [Kelekai]
- Gaspar de Sousa [married niece of Dom Alexandre de Sousa]
- Chefe Juridiçao Fatumarto Domingos da Costa Belo (1948–1965)
- Dona Maria & Gaspar [Uaitunau]
- Chefe Juridiçao Fatumarto Joaquim
- Chefe Juridiçao Fatumarto Luís da Conceição Mira Belo
- Chefe Suco Raimundo Belo [Uma Ana Ulo]
- Domingos de Sousa
- Vicente de Sousa

=== Kings of Bibiluto ===
- Dom João (fl. 1703)
- Dom Caetano de Melo de Castro (fl. 1726)
- Dom Mateus da Costa (fl. c. 1769)
- Dona Isabel de Carvalho da Silva (fl. 1815)
- Dom António (fl. 1818)
- Dom Domingos da Costa (fl. 1854)
- Dom Bernardo Cardoso (fl. 1874–1881)
- Dona Guimare da Costa (1891–?)

=== Kings of Bibissuço ===
- Dom Francisco Soares da Costa (fl. 1815)
- Dom Manuel Fernandes Tavares (fl. 1854)
- Dom Florencio Fernandes Hornay (fl. 1874–1881)
- Dom Afonso Hornay de Soares Pereira (fl. 1885–1913)

=== Kings of Bobonaro ===
- Valli Mawu (fl. 1760)
- Dom Lac Theu, in Hoto-sae
- Dom Tai Mau, in Hot-Topá [brother]
- Two queens [widows of Dom Lac-Theu and Dom Tai Mau
- Dom Cleto (Cai Leto) (before 1896-c. 1910) [nephew of the two queens]
- Dom Loe Mau (fl. 1911) [nephew]
- Dom Leto Mau [brother]
- Mateus Barros (fl. 1942)
- Dom Mau Lulu, his name baptis is Joao Vilar Moreira, (Village of Marobo, Soileso, traditional housing is Dasi-ubun, he was born in the date 5 of month of may, 1875– and he died in 01 of April 1941) : He ruled 3 villages namely Atuaben, Soileso and Ilatlaun and including Hauba. During the war in Manufahi 1911–1912 he sent 40 young men from Marobo Villages to expel the Portuguese. His wife's name is Soi-Lelo, from Traditional housing is Lico-Omau. His father's name is Tailoco and his mother's name is motsu-Loe.
- Dom Alfredo Soares (before 1952–1958) [nephew of Dom Leto Mau]
- Dom Vitorino Rodrigues (1958-after 1964) [brother]
- Dom Afonso Henriques ( Village of Hauba – 1983)
- Dom Vitorino Henriques ( Bobonaro-Honalo, 1991)

=== Kings of Cailaco ===
- Dom Aleixo (fl. 1726)
- Dom Paulo de Sá (fl. c. 1769)
- Samalelo (fl. 1815)
- Dom Matheos Rodrigues de Mattos e Gois (fl. 1854)
- Nai-Bute (fl. 1896)
- Dom Bacu Mali (1928) village of Raiheu.

=== Kings of Caimau ===
- Dom João Baptista Vieira (fl. 1815)
- Dom Tomáz Baptista e Gois (fl. 1854)
- Dom Ventura Godinho Garcia (fl. 1874–1888)
- Dom António Mesquita
- Dom Manuel Gama Barata de Conceição Mesquita (1935–1975) [son]

=== Kings of Cairui ===
- Dom Pedro (fl. 1726)
- Dom Domingos Luís (fl. c. 1769)
- Dom Francisco Luíz Ximenes (fl. 1815)
- Dom José Ximenes (fl. 1854)
- Dom João da Costa Ximenes (fl. 1877–1878)
- Dom António Ximenes (fl. 1888)

=== Kings of Camenaça ===
- Dom Domingos Tavares (fl. 1703)
- Dom Matias da Costa (fl. 1726–1731)
- Dom Manuel Tavares (fl. c. 1769)
- Bei Metan (1908–?)
- Nae-Clara (fl. 1911)
- Nai Cameteti (fl. 1941)
- Naha Mali (fl. 1952)
- Dom Vidal Clau (fl. 1975)

=== Kings of Claco ===
- Dom Francisco Fernandes (fl. 1703)
- Dom Belchior Fernandes (fl. 1726)
- Dom Manuel Hornay (fl. c. 1769)
- Dona Vicente da Costa (fl. 1815)

=== Kings of Cotubaba ===
- Dom António da Costa (fl. 1700)
- Dom Lelo Mali (fl. 1754) Son of Dom Antonio da Costa
- Dom Manuel da Costa fl. 1760) Son of Dom Antonio da Costa
- Dom José Tavares da Costa, Mau Buti, (fl. c. 1769) Son of Dom Antonio da Costa
- Dom Francisco da Costa(fl. 1815) Son of Dom Jose Tavares da Costa
- Dom José da Costa (Tasi Mali/Tesmali) fl. 1854) Son of Dom Jose Tavares da Costa
- Dom Alexandre da Costa Mendes, Appointed King from house of Pasilara (Abandoned people, fled, and died in Fatukmetan in 1896) (fl. 1880–1896)
- Dom João Antonio Carvalho da Silva Tavares da Costa (Kapitaun Dasa Rae) (fl. 1896–1912) Son of Dom Jose Tavares da Costa

=== Kings of Cova ===
- Dom Joaquim Ribeiro (fl. c. 1769)
- Dom Lourenço Ribeiro da Costa (fl. 1815–1817)
- Dom Feliciano Ribeiro da Costa (fl. 1832)
- Dona Anna Ribeiro da Costa (fl. 1854)
- Bruno (before 1870)
- Dona Maria Pires (fl. 1870–1871)
- Dona Ursula (1870–?)
- Dona Margarida Ribeiro Pires (1894–?)

=== Kings of Dailor ===
- Dom Álvaro de Sousa (fl. 1726)
- Dom João da Fonseca Hornay (fl. c. 1769)
- Dom Julião da Conceição (fl. 1815)
- Dona Clara da Silva (fl. 1854)
- Dom Julião da Conceição (fl. 1884)
- Dom Felix (fl. 1942)

=== Kings of Deribate ===
- Dallu Dau (fl. 1760)
- Dom Samuel (fl. 1761–1764)
- Lamak Mauk (fl. 1765)
- Dom Cristóvão Gracias (fl. c. 1769)
- Seromally (fl. 1815)
- Dom João Rodrigues Pinto (fl. 1854)
- Dom José (?-1896)
- Dom João (?-1896) [brother]
- Nai Bili (1896–1902) [cousin]
- Dom António (before 1912) [cousin of Dom João]
- Dom Duarte da Silva (of eastern Deribate c. 1912–1937) [nephew of Dom José]

=== Kings of Dote ===
- Dom Tomás do Rosario (fl. c. 1769)
- Dona Catharina de Carceres (fl. 1815)
- Dom Domingos de Conceição (fl. 1854)
- Dom Domingos António Ribeiro (fl. 1874)
- Dom Simão da Costa (fl. 1885)

=== Kings of Ermera ===
- Sama Lelo (fl. 1760)
- Miguel Mesquita (fl. 1761–1765)
- Salo Bexa (fl. c. 1769)
- Dom Mateus de Mesquita Hornay (c. 1784-?)
- Dam (fl. 1815)
- A king (?-1849)
- Dona Vasso Bere (1849-after 1854) [widow]
- Dom Mateus de Mesquita Hornay da Costa Baracho (fl. 1875–1882)
- Dom Manuel Luíz da Graça Mesquita (fl. 1885)
- Dom Francisco Martins (fl. 1895–1900)
- Joaquim Sanches king of Fatubessi (fl. 1912–1975)

=== Kings of Failacor ===
- Dom Domingos da Costa (fl. 1815)
- Dom António da Costa Seabra (fl.1854– c. 1860)
- Dona Senhorinha Pimentel (fl. 1880–1884)

=== Kings of Fatuboro ===
- Dom Pedro da Costa (fl. 1760-c. 1769)
- António Sang (fl. 1832)

=== Kings of Fatumean ===
- Grinaldo Pereira (fl. c. 1769)
- Fahik (fl. 1895)
- Kiaren Taek (fl. 1928)
- Clara Assi (fl. 1942/45)

=== Kings of Faturó ===
- Lebosy (fl. 1669)
- Dom Lourenço da Rocha (fl. 1703)
- Dom Sebastião (fl. 1726)
- Dom João Pereira (fl. c. 1769)
- Dom Balthazar da Rosa (fl. 1815)
- Cay-Liba (fl. 1854)
- Dom António da Costa Pereira (fl. 1877)

=== Kings of Funar ===
- Dona Esperanca dos Santos Pinto (fl. 1815)
- Dona Aurelia Soares (fl. 1854)
- Dona Magdalena Soares (fl. 1881)
- Dom Gregorio Soares (fl. 1881) [husband, from Manatuto royal family]
- Dom João da Cruz (fl. 1905)
- Dato Jeremias Hahik Wain
- Dom José de Espírito Santo [son of Na'i Suan]
- Aníbal do Espírito Santo (fl. 1952) [son]

=== Kings of Hera ===
- Bealu (fl. 1668)
- Donna Isabel Cardoso (fl. 1726)
- Dom Ventura da Costa (fl. c. 1769)
- Dom António Soares (fl. 1815)
- Dona Aurelia Soares (fl. 1854)
- Dona Francisca Soares (c. 1873–?)
- Dom Mathias Soares (fl. 1873–1886)
- Gaspar Henrique Cardoso Soares (before 1884–1900)
- Dom Gregorio Cardoso
- Gaspar Cardoso
- Santiago Arnaldo Silva Cardoso (late 20th century)
- Gaspar Tiago Arnaldo Cardoso Pereira (Son of Santiago)

=== Kings of Lacló ===
- Ynalou (fl. 1668)
- Dom Paulo Carceres (fl. c. 1769)
- Dona Rosa de Carceres (fl. 1815)
- Dona Ingracia Doutel Carceres (fl. 1854)
- Dom Ventura (1858?-after 1861)
- Dom Boaventura dos Reis e Cunha (fl. 1861–1877)
- Dona Josepha Noronha Carceres (fl. 1879–1891)
- Dom Frederico dos Reis e Cunha (fl. 1879–1901)
- Dom Vicente dos Santos Carceres (fl. 1893–1896)
- Dom Luís dos Reis Noronha (before 1912–1935)

=== Kings of Laclubar ===
- Dom Geraldo do Rosario (fl. 1854)
- Dona Binaek (fl. 1881–1883)
- Dom Gaspar Soares (fl. 1881–1883) [husband, from Manatuto royal family]
- Dom Geraldo Soares (fl. 1910)
- Dom Vidal Doutel Sarmento (fl. 1912–1930)
- João Soares (fl. 1930 – 1940)
- Dona Joana Amaral Sarmento Moniz da Silva (c. 1945)
- António Moniz da Silva (fl. 1952 – 1975)
- Luis Soares (King of Fatu-ikun, currently Bora / Manelima [fl. 1954 – 1975])

=== Kings of Lacluta ===
- Dom Domingos Tavares (fl. 1702)
- Dom João da Fonseca (fl. 1726) [brother of Manuel Hornay of Claco]
- Manuel da Silva (fl. 1738)
- Dom João Soares (fl. c. 1769) [brother of the King of Vemasse]
- José de Carvalho (fl. 1789)
- Dom Vicente João Soares (fl. 1815)
- Dona Roza Rodrigues Tavares (fl. 1854)
- Dom Vicente Soares (fl. 1873)
- Dom Cosme de Fonseca Soares (fl. 1873–1883)
- Dom Casimiro de Carvalho (?-1942/45)

=== Kings of Lacore ===
- Dom Carlos (fl. 1726)
- Dom António do Rosário (fl. c. 1769)
- Dona Anna do Rosário (fl. 1815)
- Dom António de Rosário Cabral (fl. 1854)
- Dom Carlos Cabral do Rosário (before 1880–1901)
- incorporated in Manatuto 1901
- Diogo Cabral (20th century)

=== Kings of Laga ===
- Lewe Oso
- Ma Lewe [son]
- Bou Ma [son]
- Dom Gaspar Ximenes (Ono Bou) (fl. 1815–1863) [son]
- Dom Manuel (fl. 1881)
- Domingos da Gama Sousa (Rica Na’u) (fl. 1912) [stepson of Ono Bau]
- António de Sousa Gama
- João Gama de Costa Castro (?-1995) [son]
- António Castro (1995–)

=== Kings of Laleia ===
- Dom Salvador (fl. 1726)
- Dom Domingos da Costa dos Remédios (fl. c. 1769)
- Dom André Salvador da Costa dos Remedios (fl. 1815)
- Dona Jozepha da Costa dos Remedios (fl. 1854)
- Dona Lucinda Dias Veira Godinho (fl. c. 1860)
- Dom Manuel Salvador da Costa dos Remédios (1871–1881)
- Dom Manuel Delgado Ximenes (1881–1887)
- Dom Braz Feliciano Ribeiro Pires (fl. 1884)
- Dom Feliciano Ribeiro Pires (1887-after 1895) [nephew of Dom Manuel Salvador da Costa dos Remédios]

=== Kings of Leimeia ===
- Dom Caetano Pereira (fl. c. 1769)
- Dom Luíz Pereira (fl. 1815)
- Dom Caetano da Costa (fl. 1854)
- Dom Mateus da Costa (fl. 1874–1879)
- Dom Manuel da Costa (fl. 1879)

=== Kings of Liquiçá ===
- Dom José Reis (Rodrigues) Pereira (fl. 1769)
- Dom António Rodrigues Pereira (fl. 1815)
- Dona Ursula da Costa (fl. 1818)
- Dom João da Costa Delgado (fl. 1854–64)
- Bakoli (?-c. 1870)
- Dona Gracia da Costa Rodrigues Pereira (fl. 1881–1883)
- Dom Aleixo Rodrigues Pereira (fl. 1881–1883 [son of Dom Antonio Rodrigues Pereira]
- Dona Engracia da Costa Delgado (fl. 1890–1892)
- Dom João da Costa Delgado (fl. 1879–1892)
- Dom Domingos Correia Alves (coronel-regent fl. 1893–1896)
- Dom Joaquim Rodrigues Pereira (fl. 1910) [son of Dom Aleixo Rodrigues Pereira]

=== Kings of Lolotoe ===
- Dom Ventura da Costa (capitão-mor fl. 1726) [son of Dom Mateus da Costa of Viqueque]
- Beliço capitão (fl. 1732)
- Bei-Lima (fl. 1897)
- Luan-Bau (fl. 1942–1952)

=== Kings of Luca ===
- Liurai Afoan Sila (before Portuguese times in Dili))
- Liurai Feto Na’i Lou Baria Sak (c. 1670)
- Liurai Na’i Lequi Sak
- Liurai Na’i Lulequik I
- Dom Sebastião Fernandes (fl. 1703)
- Dom António Aveiro do Amaral (tenente-coronel fl. 1726)
- Dom Sancho Manuel (fl. 1738)
- Dom Sebastião do Amaral (before c. 1769-c. 1782)
- Dom Tomás do Amaral (1782-after 1789) [nephew]
- Dona Anna do Amaral (fl. 1815)
- Dom Felix António do Amaral (fl. 1817)
- Dona Maria Amaral (1826–1850)
- Liurai Na’i Lulequik II (1850–1880)
- Dom João de Amaral (fl. 1854)
- Dom Luiz dos Reis e Cunha (fl. 1869–1876) [of Barique princely family]
- Dom José Amaral (1880–1885)
- Dona Rosa Amaral (c. 1881-c. 1896) [widow]
- Dom Clementino dos Reis Amaral (c. 1896–1914) [nephew of Dom José]
- Dom Tomás A. dos Reis Amaral (1914–1917) [son]
- Dom Lourenço Amaral (1917–1923) [brother of Dom Clementino]
- Dom Tomás A. dos Reis Amaral (1923–1926, second time)
- Dom Lourenço Amaral (1926–1933, second time)
- Dom Jeremias dos Reis Amaral (1933–1943) [nephew of Dom Tomás]
- Zeferino Amaral (1944–1959) (son of Dom Lourenço)
- Paulo Guterres (1959–1989) [son-in-law of Dom Tomás]
- Domingos Torrezão dos Reis Amaral (1979–1989) [son of Zeferino]
- Francisco A. T. A. Guterres (1989–) [son of Paulo Guterres]

=== Kings of Mahubo ===
- Dom José Rodrigues Pereira (fl. 1815)
- Dom João Rodrigues Pereira (fl. 1854)
- Dom Grégorio (before 1863–1896)
- Dom Paulo (1896–1900)
- Saca-Bere (1900-before 1912)
- Dom António da Silva (?-1946)
- Belarmino de Jesus Soares (1946-after 1964) [nephew]

=== Monarchs of Malaka and Belu ===
- Tei Seran Ulu Baete (of Malaka 1917–1924) [Liurai of Wehali]
- Josef Seran Fatin (of Malaka 1924–1930, of Belu 1930–1932) [father's cousin]
- Benediktus Laki (of Belu 1932–41, 1947–52, 1955–58) [son of Tahu Leki of Lakekun]
- Luis Sanaka Tei Seran (of Central Malaka 1955–2003) [son of Tei Seran Ulu Baete]

=== Kings of Manatuto ===
- Malleas (Ama Leas) (fl. 1668–1677)
- Dom Domingos Soares (fl. 1703–1719)
- Dom António Soares (fl. 1720–1726)
- Dom José (?-1758)
- Dom Mateus Soares (fl. c. 1769–1815)
- Manuel Pereira da Costa (fl. 1849)
- Dona Aurelia Soares (fl. 1854)
- Mateus Vieira Godinho (fl. 1855–1856)
- Dom Luís Soares (fl. c. 1870–1879)
- Dona Rita (fl. 1879; died 1895)
- Dom Mateus Frederico dos Reis Soares (fl. 1880–1888)
- Dom António Guterres (fl. 1893)
- Dom João Soares (fl. 1896)
- Dom Joaquim Guterres (20th century)
- Dom José Guterres (20th century) [brother]

=== Kings of Manufahi ===
- Dom Duarte da Costa Sotto Maior I (fl. 1720–1726)
- Dom Mateus Doutel da Costa (fl. 1815)
- Dona Maria de Mattos (fl. 1854)
- Dom Francisco da Costa Sotto Maior (c. 1874–?)
- Dom Duarte da Costa Sotto Maior II (before 1894–1901)
- Dom Boaventura da Costa Sotto Maior (Mau Loik) (1901–1912) [son]

=== Kings of Manumera ===
- Dom João Monis de Matos (fl. 1854)
- Dom Luíz Xavier de Mesquita (fl. 1876)
- Dom António Marques de Matos (fl. 1879–1884)
- Dom Mathias de Mesquita (fl. 1891)
- José de Almeida Sá e Benevides (fl. 1952)

=== Kings of Maubara ===
- Dom Francisco Xavier (fl. 1726)
- Dom José Xavier Doutel (before 1754–1776 )
- Dom Caleto Xavier Doutel I (1776–1794) [son]
- Nyong Mas (1794-?) [son]
- Dom Caleto II (before 1832–1859)
- Dom José (1859-after 1861)
- Dom Carlos (fl. 1861–1864)
- Dom Dotte (1872–?)
- Dona Maria Doutel (before 1877–1893)
- Dom José Calau (Nocolau) (fl. 1881–1887)
- Dom José Maubile (1893-after 1896)
- Dona Maria Isabel (1897–?)
- Dom José de Santos (before 1910-1927/28)
- Dom José Nunes (before 1942–1952)
- Gaspar Correia da Silva Nunes (fl. 1952–1975) [son]

=== Kings of Maucatar ===
- Dom Miguel Texeira (?-c. 1735)
- Dom João da Costa de Sacramento (c. 1735-c. 1747) [brother]
- Dom António (c. 1747-?) [son]
- Tahik Asu Rakat (1834-after 1882)
- Vau Lelo (1900-after 1914)
- Assa Mau (?-1942/45)
- Mateus Barros (fl. 1942/45)
- Clementino Guterres (fl. 1952–1964)

=== Kings of Motael ===
- Dom Gregorio Rodrigues Pereira I (fl. 1726–32, coronel)
- Dom Alexandre Rodrigues Pereira (fl. 1763–1769, tenente coronel)
- Dom Jose Rodrigues Pereira (fl. 1766, capitão-mor das provincias dos Belos)
- Dom Cosme Rodrigues Pereira (fl. 1789)
- Dom Gregorio Rodrigues Pereira II (before 1810–1820, brigadeiro general)
- Dom António da Costa Pereira (before 1832–1857)
- Dona Maria da Costa Mendes (1857–1864)
- Piatru (fl. 1869)
- Donna Engracia Rodrigues Pereira (fl. 1871–1874)
- Dom Manuel Delgado Ximenes (fl. 1879–1881)
- Dom Tomás Suriano Pereira (fl. 1879–1889, coronel)
- Dom João da Costa Pereira (fl. 1882–1891)
- Dom Lucas Barreto Martins (fl. 1885–1895)
- Dom Albino Morais
- Dom Manuel de Ataíde (c. 1900)
- Dom António Ataíde (?-1912) [son]

=== Kings of Nusadila ===
- Dom Pedro (fl. 1761)
- Lay Loor (fl. 1760–1765)
- Sowokay (fl. 1832)
- Mau Buca (fl. 1952)
- Manuel (fl. 1964)

=== Topass officers and kings of Oecussi ===
- António Hornay (1664–1666) [son of Jan de Hornay]
- Mateus da Costa (1666–1669, 1670–1672)
- António Hornay (1673–1693, second time)
- Francisco Hornay I (1693–1696) [brother of António Hornay]
- Domingos da Costa I (1697–1722) [son of Mateus da Costa)]
- Francisco Hornay II (1722–1730) [son of António Hornay]
- João Cave (1730–1731) [brother-in-law]
- Gaspar da Costa (1732–1749) [putative son of Domingos da Costa I]
- João Hornay (1749–1757) [grandson of Daniel de Cock]
- Francisco Hornay III (1757–1777) [son]
- Domingos da Costa II (1757-after 1772) [brother of Gaspar da Costa]
- Pedro Hornay (1777-c. 1795) [brother of Francisco Hornay III]
- José Hornay (c. 1795-after 1817) [son]
- Filippe Hornay (fl. 1838)
- Da Costa (1847?–1852)
- João Hornay Madeira (1852-after 1879)
- Domingos da Costa III (fl. 1888–1896)
- Dom Alexander Hornay dos Santos da Cruz (fl. 1894) [son of Luíz Hornay]
- Pedro da Costa (fl. 1898)
- Hugo da Costa (before 1910–1948) [son of Domingos da Costa III)
- João Hermengildo da Costa (1948–1990) [son of Hugo da Costa]
- José Hermengildo da Costa (1949–1999) [son of Hugo da Costa]

=== Kings of Ossoroa ===
- Dom Francisco da Silva (fl. 1727)
- Olo Sak
- Laca Olo [son]
- Naha Laca [son]
- Lequi Nahak [son]
- Lai-Naha (fl. 1893)
- Dom António Da Silva [son of Lequi-Nahak]
- Dom Paulo da Costa Freitas e Silva (1926–1944) [1st son of Dom Antonio Da Silva]
- Paulo Freitas da Silva (1939–2011) [son of Dom Paulo Da Costa Freitas e Silva]

=== Kings of Ossu ===
- Dom Pedro da Costa
- Urbano [son]
- Naha-Uru [son]
- Modo-Duu [son]
- Dom Pedro Olo-Duu [brother]
- Dom Francisco da Costa (Bosi-Leki) (c. 1900–1951) [nephew]
- Gaspar da Silva Guterres (1952–1975; died 1996) [grandson of Dom Pedro Olo-Duu]

=== Kings of Raimean ===
- Dom Caetano da Costa (fl. 1732)
- Dom Lourenço da Costa (fl. c. 1769)
- Domingos de Faria (fl. 1815)
- Nae-Tolo (fl. 1912)
- Mali-Bido (fl. 1942)
- Alarico Fernandes Pereira (before 1952–1975) [son]

=== Kings of Samoro ===
- Ussi Leki Tehek
- Ussi Leki Meta [son]
- Ussi Fahi Kerek
- Ussi Taru Tahuk
- Ussi Leki Uaik
- Ussi Kere Uaik
- Four monarchs
- Dom António Hornay (fl. 1703–1720)
- Dom Bernardo Doutel Sarmento (fl. 1726–1732) [purported son]
- Dom Henrique Hornay Samoro (fl. 1738) [son-in-law]
- Dom Simão (fl. 1761)
- Dom Bernardo Tavares Sarmento (fl. 1766-c.1769) [purported son of Dom Bernardo Sarmento]
- Dona Guimar de Amal (fl. 1815)
- Dom Joaquim Doutel (fl. 1851)
- Dom Bernardo Doutel Sarmento (fl. 1854–1879) [brother; purported son of Dom Bernardo Tavares Sarmento]
- Dom Victor Doutel Sarmento (1887–?) [son]
- Dom André Doutel Sarmento (fl. 1899) [son of Dom Bernardo Doutel Sarmento]
- Dom Vidal Doutel Sarmento (before 1912–1933) [son of Dom Victor Doutel Sarmento]
- Raimundo Doutel Sarmento (1933–1959) [grandson of Dom André Doutel Sarmento]
- Guilhermino Doutel Sarmento (1959–2000) [son of Dom Vidal Doutel Sarmento]

=== Kings of Saniri ===
- Lelobese (fl. 1731)
- Dom António (fl. c. 1769)

=== Kings of Sarau ===
- Dom Filipe (fl. 1700)
- Tabi Coro (fl. 1703)
- Dom Álvaro da Costa (fl. 1726)
- Dom Luís Doutel (fl. c. 1769)
- Dom Álvaro Doutel (fl. 1815)
- Dom Matheus (?-1851)
- Dom Álvaro da Costa Hornay (fl. 1854–1876)
- Dom Alberto Smith (fl. 1877)
- Dom Alexandre da Costa Hornay (fl. 1889)
- Eugenio da Silva (fl. 1997)

=== Kings of Souro, Lospalos ===
- Dom Cipriano Monteiro da Costa "Ratu-Mimiraka" (before 1890–1953). [“He was a strong and determined king. In 1890, during a council meeting in Lautém, the Portuguese colonial government invited him to accept the King’s Scepter. He refused, stating that he was of noble descent since the time of his ancestors and had long been the king of Souro. He believed he did not need the scepter to be recognized as king, as accepting it would mean submitting to Portuguese rule. He therefore asked the Portuguese to give the scepter only to those who had never ruled as king.”].
- Prince of Royal Henrique da Costa "Souro No-lafai" (1920–1974)[eldest son of Dom Cipriano Monteiro da Costa][He was well known with his specialist in Public Administration]
- Dom Ventura da Costa (fl.1953–1985)[youngest son of Dom Cipriano Monteiro da Costa]
- Prince Afonso Henriques "Capulai" (1952–1987)[eldest son of Prince Henrique da Costa][He was well known as Politician and Foredoom Fighter for East Timor Independence]
- Dom Henrique Xavier (fl.1986–1996)[related family of Dom Cipriano Monteiro da Costa]
- Dom Frederico Henriques (before 1997–2000)[son of Prince Afonso Henriques/the great-grandson of King Cipriano Monteiro da Costa]

=== Kings of Suai ===
- Baltazar Lopes (fl. 1726)
- Bartis Lopes (before 1753–1754)
- A son (1754-?)
- Dom Filipe de Faria (fl. c. 1769)
- Dom José Affonso Soberal (fl. 1815)
- Fo-Lelo (fl. 1897)
- Nai Came-Tete (fl. 1942)
- Calau Bere (fl. 1952)

=== Kings of Turiscai ===
- Dom Manuel Caldeira (fl. c. 1769)
- Dom José Caldeira (fl. 1815)
- Dom Manuel Caldeira (fl. 1854)
- Dom Cosme (fl. 1900)
- Dom Luis F.S.S. Pereira (fl. 2017 – Grandson of Dom Manuel Caldeira)

=== Kings of Tutuluru ===
- Dom Domingos da Costa (fl. 1703)
- Dom Vicente Rangel (fl. c. 1769–1815)
- Dom Carlos Rodrigues Pereira (fl. 1854)

=== Kings of Ulmera ===
- Bermeta (fl. 1861)
- Bere Nua (1871–?)
- Dom Felix Barreto Pires (fl. 1886–1888)
- Carlos Correia Barreto Pires (before 1893–1895)

=== Kings of Vemasse (Ade) ===
- Sili Saba (?-1668)
- Ama Gali (fl. 1668–1670) [brother]
- Ama Sike and Ama Kap (fl. 1677)
- Woka Mau (fl. 1700) [brother of Sili Saba]
- Dom Tomás de Trenos (fl. 1703–1720)
- Dom Cosme de Freitas (fl. 1726)
- Dom Tomás de Freitas (fl. c. 1769)
- Dom Duarte de Castro (fl. 1786)
- Dom Felipe de Freitas (?-c. 1807)
- Dona Simõa Maria dos Santos Pinto (fl. 1815)
- Dom Sebastião da Costa Freitas (fl. 1854)
- Dom Domingos de Freitas Soares (?-1859, 1862-c. 1867, before 1871–1878)
- Dom Manuel da Costa Freitas (1878–1879)
- Dom Domingos da Costa Freitas (Gali Kai) (fl. 1879–1888)
- Dom Francisco da Costa Freitas (fl. 1896) [son]
- Dom Tomás da Costa Soares (1899–1928) [son-in-law]
- Dom Domingos da Costa Freitas (1928-after 1964) [son of Francisco da Costa Freitas]
- Dom Cosme Francisco da Costa Freitas [son]

=== Kings of Venilale ===
- Dom Cristóvão Guterres I (before 1808-c. 1815)
- Dona Catarina de Freitas (c. 1808–1812) [wife]
- Dona Úrsula Guterres I (fl. 1854)
- Dom Duarte Guterres (fl. 1874–1881)
- Dona Isabel de Freitas Guterres (1874-after 1888)
- Dona Maria Freitas Guterres (1891–1897)
- Dona Úrsula Guterres II (1897–?)
- Dom António Guterres (before 1912–1925)
- Dom Cristóvão Guterres II (1925–1992)

=== Kings of Vessoro ===
- Simão da Costa Amaral (Mau-Doli) (before 1903–1910)
- Dom João da Costa (1910–?)
- Tomás dos Reis Amaral (1914–1917)
- Jeremias Fernandes (fl. 1964)

=== Kings of Viqueque ===
- Dom Mateus da Costa (before 1702–1708)
- Dom Vasco dos Santos Pinto (before 1726–1729)
- Dom Dire dos Santos Pinto (fl. c. 1769)
- Dom António da Costa (fl. 1815)
- Dom Joaquim de Matos (fl. 1818)
- Dona Simõa da Costa Rangel (fl. 1854)
- Dom Matheus da Costa Rangel Pinto (fl. 1876–1893)
- Dom Paulo da Costa Soares (before 1934-1942/45; died 1965)
- Dom Miguel da Costa Soares (1942/45-1975)

== See also ==
- History of Timor-Leste
- History of Timor
- Timeline of East Timorese history
- List of years in Timor-Leste
- List of colonial Residents of Dutch Timor
- List of colonial governors of Portuguese Timor

== Bibliography ==
- Banu Naek, Yesriel Yohan Kusa (2007) Raja-raja Amanatun yang berkuasa. Yogyakarta: Pustaka Pelajar.
- Belo, Dom Carlos Filipe Ximenes (2011) Os antigos reinos de Timor-Leste (Reys de Lorosay e Reys de Lorotoba, Coronéis e Datos). Baucau: Tipografia Diocesana Baucau.
- Castro, Afonso de (1867) As possessões Portuguezas na Oceania. Lisboa: Imprensa Nacional.
- Detaq, Aco (1972) Memperkenalkan Kota Kupang. Kupang.
- Dijk, L.C. van (1925, 1934) "De zelfbesturende landschappen in de Residentie Timor en Onderhoorigheden", Indische Gids 47, 56.
- Francillon, G. (1980) "Incursions upon Wehali: A modern history of an ancient empire", in James J. Fox (ed.) The flow of life: Essays on eastern Indonesia. Cambridge, Mass.: Harvard University Press.
- Hägerdal, Hans (2012) Lords of the land, lords of the sea: Conflict and adaptation in early colonial Timor, 1600–1800. Leiden: KITLV Press.
- Hägerdal, Hans (2013) "Lay Atjien Liok and the Lidak War of 1852: Chinese networking, indigenous agency and colonial intrusion in eastern Indonesia", Indonesia and the Malay World 41 (121).
- Leitão, Humberto (1952) Vinto e oito anos de história de Timor (1698 a 1725). Lisboa: Agencia Geral do Ultramar.
- Matos, Artur Teodoro de (1974) Timor Português 1515–1769; Contribução para a sua história. Lisboa: Faculdade de Letras da Universidade de Lisboa.
- Middelkoop, P. (1939) "Amarassisch-Timoreesche teksten", Verhandelingen van het Bataviaasch Genootschap 74–2.
- Middelkoop, P. (1952) "Trektochten van Timorese groepen", Tijdschrift voor Indische Taal-, Land- en Volkenkunde 85.
- Nope, Pina Ope (2018) Konflik politik di Timor pada tahun 1600-1800an; Perjalanan Amanuban dan kerajaan Atoni lainnya menentang hegemoni bangsa Eropa atas Timor tahun 1600–1800. Niki-Niki: Prima Jaya.
- Pélissier, René (1996) Timor en guerre: le crocodile et les Portugais (1847–1913). Orgeval: Pélissier.
- Schulte Nordholt, H. G. (1971) The Political system of the Atoni of Timor. The Hague: M. Nijhoff. [Verhandelingen van het Koninklijk Instituut voor Taal-, Land- en Volkenkunde 60.]
- Soares, António Vicente Marques (2003) Pulau Timor; Sebuah sumbangan untuk sejarah. Baucau: Matebian Press.
- Taniputera, Ivan (2013) Kerajaan-kerajaan Nusantara pascakeruntuhan Majapahit. Jakarta: Gloria.
- Tey Seran, Sixtus, et al. (2006) Noemuti dalam kancah perjuangan melawan kolonialis. Kupang: Dinas Pendidikan dan Kebudayaan.
- Tifa, D. & Itta, H. (2007) Belu, pemimpin dan sejarah. Belu: Sesawi.
- Truhart, Peter (2003) Regents of nations. Part 3. Asia & Pacific Oceania. München: Saur.
- Vroklage, B.A.G. (1953) Ethnographie der Belu in Zentral-Timor, Vol. I. Leiden: Brill.
- Wadu, Jacob, et al. (2003) Sejarah pemerintahan kabupaten Timor Tengah Selatan. Kupang: Universitas Nusa Candana.
- Widiyatmika, Munandjar (2007) Lintasan sejarah bumi cendana. Kupang: Penerbit Pusat Pengembangan Madrasah NTT.
- Widiyatmika, Munandjar (2010) Kupang dalam kancah persaingan hegemoni kolonial tahun 1653–1917. Kupang: Penerbit Pusat Pengembangan Madrasah NTT.
