= List of Indonesian monarchies =

This is a list of monarchies, past and present, in Indonesia.

== A ==
- Aceh: In the northern region of Sumatra, the Sultanate of Achin or Atjeh was founded at the end of the 15th century. A powerful Islamic state in the 16th and 17th centuries.
- Adonara: A state on the volcanic island of the same name ...
- Amabi: A state in West Timor (Timor Loro Manu) which formed in 1917 the larger Kupang state ...
- Amanatun: A state in West Timor (Timor Loro Manu). The sovereignty was altered in 1962. The palace of the Raja moved from Nunkolo in 1952 ...
- Amanuban: A state in West Timor (Timor Loro Manu). The palace of the Raja is called Sonaf Naik (Big Palace) ...
- Amarasi: A state in West Timor (Timor Loro Manu) ...
- Ambeno, Ambenu, Ambeno Mosu Talip: A state in West Timor ...
- Arun: A state more or less vassal of the Sultanate of Aceh, in the Meureudu area of Sumatra. The state was part of the Federation of the XII Hulubalangs ...
- Asahan: Asahan, in east Sumatra, was founded as a state at the end of the 17th century by a son of the Sultan of Aceh. The state represented ...

== B ==
- Badung: A state created as the result of the fall of the Majapahit empire, after Dewa Agung Ketut, ruler of Bali and Lombok divided his kingdom into several states.
- Bangli: A state founded after the fall of the Majapahit empire, after Dewa Agung Ketut, ruler of Bali and Lombok divided his kingdom into several states.
- Banjar: Founded in the early 16th century by Surianshah as a result of the war for the throne of the heirs of Negara Daha. Abolished unilaterally by the Dutch East Indies in 1860, but only truly collapsed in 1905 after Muhammad Seman was killed. The Sultanate was restored in 2010 as a traditional government.
- Banten: Founded in the early 16th century on the collapse of the Majapahit Empire by the son of the King-Priester of Cirebon, the Sultanate of Banten, in western Java.
- Bima: A state existing in the 17th century on Sumbawa Island.
- Bone (also spelled Boni): In the Bugis region of the southwestern Celebes (Sulawesi Selatan). The state was founded in 1634, suppressed in 1905, restored in 1931.
- Buleleng: A state created as the result of the fall of the Majapahit empire, after Dewa Agung Ketut, ruler of Bali and Lombok divided his kingdom into several states.
- Buton (also spelled Butung): Lie on in the southeast Celebes (Sulawesi Tenggara). The state was founded in 1332.

== C ==
- Cirebon: A state founded in 1478 as a result of the fall of the Majapahit Empire, split into 4 lineages in 1662 with their own land and palace (Kraton) in Cirebon.

== D ==
- Deli: An 1,820 km^{2} state in east Sumatra founded in 1630. A Rajadom from 1630 until 1814, the state became a sultanate in 1814 when acquiring independence from Siak.
- Dolok Silau: A Simalungun kingdom in Sumatra

== G ==
- Gianyar: A state created as the result of the fall of the Majapahit empire, after Dewa Agung Ketut, ruler of Bali and Lombok divided his kingdom into several states.
- Gorontalo: A state and town in the Northern Celebes (Sulawesi Utara), founded in 1667 and suppressed in 1889.
- Gowa: A state founded in the Makassar region of southwestern Celebes before 1300.

== I ==
- Iha: Formerly an Islamic kingdom located in Saparua, Maluku.

== J ==
- Jambi: A 53,206 km^{2} state in the south of Sumatra, founded in 1690 and suspended by the Dutch in 1901.
- Jambu Lipo: An old Minangkabau kingdom in Sijunjung regency, West Sumatera province, founded around 14^{th} century, and it is believed that the kingdom predated the Pagaruyung kingdom. It has dependencies in nagaris (villages) in Dharmasraya regency and South Solok regency (both is in West Sumatera province).

== K ==
- Kaimana: This kingdom is located in the west of Papua Island, precisely on the Bomberai Peninsula, and has its capital on Adi Island.
- Kandis: This kingdom is estimated to be established c. 1 BCE, believed to be the oldest kingdom in Sumatra and the archipelago so far, located in Koto Alang, in the area of Lubuk Jambi, Kuantan Singingi Regency, Riau.
- Kangae: The native state which was in Flores, was dissolved and merged into Sikka together with Nita.
- Karangasem: A state founded after the fall of the Majapahit empire, after Dewa Agung Ketut, ruler of Bali and Lombok divided his kingdom into several states among 9 of his chiefs among ...
- Kisar: An island-state on the north of East Timor, locally named Yotowawa and sometime spelled also Kisser ...
- Klungkung: A premier state born in 1352 after the fall of the Majapahit empire, after Dewa Agung Ketut, ruler of Bali and Lombok divided his kingdom into several states among 9 of his ...
- Kubu: A state founded in 1772 in West Borneo ...
- Kupang: A federation created in 1917 composed of the principalities of Amabi, Amaabi OEfeto, Foenay, Kupang Helong, Sonbai Kecil and TaEbenu with an elected monarch ...
- Kutai: Initially called Kutai Kartanegara, the state was called Ku Tei or Big Kingdom by the Chinese. It was known as the first Hindu kingdom in present-Indonesia known as the Kutai Martadipura Kingdom founded by king Kudungga in the 4th century CE, then the Sultanate of Kutai Kartanegara ing Martadipura was formed later in the 15th century after the royalties converted to Islam.

== L ==
- Landak: A state in the island of Kalimantan.
- Langsa: A state more or less vassal of the Sultanate of Aceh, in the region of Sumatra.
- Larantuka: A 3,300 km^{2} state in the Flores islands, founded c1400 ...
- Laura: A state on the island of Sumba ...
- Limboto: A state and town in the Northern Celebes (Sulawesi Utara), founded in 1667 and suppressed in 1895
- Lio: A state in the Flores islands ...
- Lise: A state in the Flores islands ...
- Lombok: A state-island in Bali that became independent after the fall of the Majapahit empire, after Dewa Agung Ketut, ruler of Bali and Lombok divided his kingdom into several states ...
- Luwu: A state founded before 1600 in the Bugis region of the Southern Celebes ...

== M ==
- Majene: A state in the Mandar region in the Southern Celebes ...
- Mamuju: A state in the Mandar region in the Southern Celebes ...
- Manggarai: A state in the Flores islands, founded in 1759. From 1762 until 1815 and from 1851 until 1907, Manggarai was part of the Sultanate of Bima ...
- Mangkualaman: it was divided out of the historical holdings of the royal family of Pakualaman on 23 August 2021 as a proposed settlement between Royal claimants with KGPAA Mangku Alam Al-Haj Maulana Abdullah Khalifatullah Al-Jawi as head of the principality. The settlement is based on the historic restoration of the Merdiko Praja Mangkualaman Principality, which was established on March 7, 1822, by the Dutch East Indies colonial government.
- Mangkunegaran: A 2,579.98 km^{2} state founded on 17 March 1757 in the Surakarta Sunanate.
- Mappa: A state in the Toraja region of the Southern Celebes ...
- Marang: A state and town in the Makassar region in the Southern Celebes ...

== N ==
- Napu: A state in the Middle Celebes.
- Napu: A state on the island of Sumba.
- Nita: A state in the Flores islands.

== P ==
- Pagaruyung: The seat of Minangkabau kings of Western Sumatra ...
- Pakualaman: A 417.62 km^{2} state founded on 22 June 1812 or 17 March 1813 in the Sultanate of Yogyakarta in Java.
- Palembang Darussalam: The Sultanate of Palembang Darussalam (Sumatra) was proclaimed in 1675 and dissolved by the colonial government of the Dutch Indies on October 7, 1823.
- Perlak: The earliest sultanate in Southeast Asia, believed to be accepted Islam as early as the 9th century.
- Pontianak: The state of Pontianak was created in Western Borneo (Kalimantan Barat) in 1771 but was elevated as a sultanate only in 1778 by the Raja of Riau.

== R ==
- Riau-Lingga: A Malay Sultanate existed between 1824-1918.

== S ==
- Sambas: A state in West Borneo ...
- Sekar: A small kingdom located in Sekar, Fakfak Regency, West Papua
- Serdang: A state in East Sumatra (Sumatera Timur), independent from Siak on 16/8/1862.
- Siak Sri Indrapura: A state in eastern Sumatra founded in 1722, split from Johor Empire, and became dominant in the region in the 18th century, and contracted in the following century to the Siak River basin.
- Simalungun: Confederation of Simalungun ethnic kingdoms. From the 1400s to 1907 it consisted of 4 native states (called Raja Maropat; lit. 'The Four Kings'), then from 1907 to 1946 during its dissolution it consisted of 7 native states (called Raja Marpitu; lit. 'The Seven Kings').
- Solor Watan Lema: A confederation of five Islamic kingdoms in East Nusa Tenggara.
- Sonbai: A dynasty in West Timor which was divided in Sonbai Besar and Sonbai Kecil.
- Soya: A small kingdom in Ambon, Maluku Islands.
- Sunda: A kingdom in Indonesia.
- Sungai Pagu: An old Minangkabau kingdom in the southern part of West Sumatera province. It centers in Nagari Pasia Talang, Sungai Pagu, in South Solok Regency. It has dependencies in Banda Sapuluah, in South Pesisir regency, West Sumatera province, today.
- Surakarta: A 3,635 km^{2} state in Java founded in 1755 after the state of Mataram split into two states.

== T ==
- Tabanan: is a kingdom in central Bali, built by "Shri Arya Kenceng" the chief of the Majapahit Army who attacked the "Bali Kuna" kingdom in the 14th century. Then for 21 generation his descendant ruled Tabanan.
- Tanette: founded around 1547 in South Sulawesi ...
- Ternate: A 65 km^{2} state in the Moluccas founded in the 13th century by people from Djaïlolo (today Jailolo). Ternate became the premier state of the Moluccas in 1380 over Djailolo.
- Tidore: is a center of a spice-funded sultanate that arose in the 15th century.

== U ==
- Ubud: A Raja family in the principality of Gianyar in southeast Bali.

== W ==
- Wajoq: A state founded c.1450 by refugees by Luwu in the Bugi region of the Southwestern Celebes (Sulawesi Selatan). A kind of aristocratic republic governed by a council.
- Wehali: A kingdom in the southern part of Central Timor, regarded by the Timorese as the centre of their political culture.

== Y ==
- Yogyakarta: In 1755, the Sultanate of Mataram in Java split into two states: Yogyakarta and Surakarta. Both states were subject to the indirect rule of the Dutch until 1949 when Indonesia gained independence and full recognition from the Netherlands.

== See also ==
- List of regencies and cities of Indonesia for current governmental divisions
