= 1749 =

1749 in various calendars
- Gregorian calendar: 1749; MDCCXLIX
- Ab urbe condita: 2502
- Armenian calendar: 1198; ԹՎ ՌՃՂԸ
- Assyrian calendar: 6499
- Balinese saka calendar: 1670–1671
- Bengali calendar: 1155–1156
- Berber calendar: 2699
- British Regnal year: 22 Geo. 2 – 23 Geo. 2
- Buddhist calendar: 2293
- Burmese calendar: 1111
- Byzantine calendar: 7257–7258
- Chinese calendar: 戊辰年 (Earth Dragon); 4446 or 4239 — to — 己巳年 (Earth Snake); 4447 or 4240
- Coptic calendar: 1465–1466
- Discordian calendar: 2915
- Ethiopian calendar: 1741–1742
- Hebrew calendar: 5509–5510
- Hindu calendars
- Vikram Samvat: 1805–1806
- Shaka Samvat: 1670–1671
- Kali Yuga: 4849–4850
- Holocene calendar: 11749
- Igbo calendar: 749–750
- Iranian calendar: 1127–1128
- Islamic calendar: 1162–1163
- Japanese calendar: Kan'en 2 (寛延２年)
- Javanese calendar: 1673–1674
- Julian calendar: Gregorian minus 11 days
- Korean calendar: 4082
- Minguo calendar: 163 before ROC 民前163年
- Nanakshahi calendar: 281
- Thai solar calendar: 2291–2292
- Tibetan calendar: ས་ཕོ་འབྲུག་ལོ་ (male Earth-Dragon); 1875 or 1494 or 722 — to — ས་མོ་སྦྲུལ་ལོ་ (female Earth-Snake); 1876 or 1495 or 723

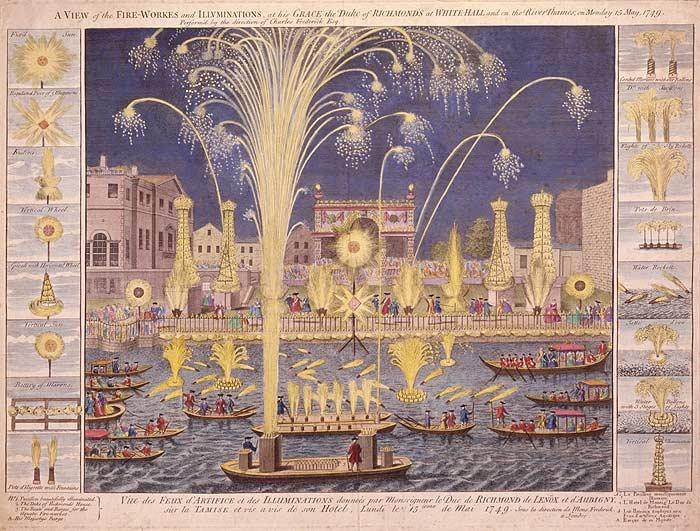
April 27: First performance of George Frideric Handel's Music for the Royal Fireworks takes place.

1749 (MDCCXLIX) was a common year starting on Wednesday of the Gregorian calendar and a common year starting on Sunday of the Julian calendar, the 1749th year of the Common Era (CE) and Anno Domini (AD) designations, the 749th year of the 2nd millennium, the 49th year of the 18th century, and the 10th and last year of the 1740s decade. As of the start of 1749, the Gregorian calendar was 11 days ahead of the Julian calendar, which remained in localized use until 1923.

== Events ==
=== January–March ===
- January 3
  - Benning Wentworth issues the first of the New Hampshire Grants, leading to the establishment of Vermont.
  - The first issue of Berlingske, Denmark's oldest continually operating newspaper, is published.
- January 21 – The Teatro Filarmonico, the main opera theater in Verona, Italy, is destroyed by fire. It is rebuilt in 1754.
- February – The second part of John Cleland's erotic novel Fanny Hill (Memoirs of a Woman of Pleasure) is published in London. The author is released from debtors' prison in March.
- February 28 – Henry Fielding's comic novel The History of Tom Jones, a Foundling is published in London. Also this year, Fielding becomes magistrate at Bow Street, and first enlists the help of the Bow Street Runners, an early police force (eight men at first).
- March 6 – A "corpse riot" breaks out in Glasgow after a body disappears from a churchyard in the Gorbals district. Suspicion falls on anatomy students at the Glasgow Infirmary "had raised a dead body from the grave and carried it to the college" for dissection. The city guard intervenes after a mob of protesters begins breaking windows at random buildings, but groups of citizens begin to make regular patrols of church graveyards
- March 17 – At London's Covent Garden, composer George Frideric Handel conducts the first performance of his new oratorio, Solomon. More than 250 years later, an instrumental from Solomon, "The Arrival of the Queen of Sheba"; will be featured in the 2012 London Summer Olympics opening ceremony.

=== April–June ===
- April 14 – British Royal Navy ship HMS Namur is wrecked in a storm near Fort St. David, India, with the loss of 520 lives.
- April 27 – The first official performance of Handel's Music for the Royal Fireworks in London finishes early, due to the outbreak of fire. The piece had been composed by Handel to commemorate the Peace of Aix-la-Chapelle, which ended the War of the Austrian Succession in 1748.
- May 19 – King George II of Great Britain grants the Ohio Company 200,000 acres (81,000 ha) (312½ square miles or 810 km^{2}) of land north of the Ohio River, encompassing most of the modern U.S. state of Ohio and part of West Virginia. The grant is conditioned on the Company being able to attract 100 European families every year, for seven years, to move to the area occupied by Indian tribes, and to build a fort to protect them
- June 4 – A fire in Glasgow leaves 200 families homeless.
- June 6 – The Conspiracy of the Slaves, which was to have taken place on June 29, is revealed in Malta.

=== July–September ===
- July 9 – The British naval fort at Halifax is founded on mainland Nova Scotia as a defense against the New France Fortress of Louisbourg on Cape Breton Island, less than 100 miles (160 km) away.
- August 2 – Irish-born trader George Croghan, unaware of the recent British grant of land in the Ohio River valley to the Ohio Company, purchases 200,000 acres of much of the same land from the Six Nations of the Iroquois Confederacy, dealing directly with "the three most important Iroquois chiefs resident in that area, in return for an immense quantity of Indian goods." The deal takes place at the Iroquois capital of Onondaga, near present-day Syracuse, New York.
- August 3
  - The Battle of Ambur is fought in south India as the Second Carnatic War begins between the French-supported troops of Chanda Sahib of the Mughal Empire and the British-supported defenders of the Arcot State, led by its 77-year old Nawab, Anwaruddin Khan. After marching outside of the walls of Arcot to confront Chanda Sahib and Joseph Dupleix's 4,000 troops, Anwaruddin Khan's numerically superior force is routed and he is killed in the battle.
  - French explorer Pierre Joseph Céloron de Blainville, commissioned by New France to explore the Ohio Territory claimed by both France and Britain, buries the first of six engraved lead markers claiming the land for King Louis XV. The first plate is buried on the banks of the Allegheny River, near a rock with petroglyphs, in what is now Venango County, Pennsylvania.
- August 7 – Mary Musgrove Bosomworth, a woman of mixed British and Creek Indian ancestry, presents herself as Coosaponakeesa, Queen of the Creek Indians and marches with 200 Creek Indians into the town of Savannah, Georgia. During her confrontation with British colonial authorities, she and her husband Thomas Bosomworth demand payment of "nearly twenty-five thousand dollars" in compensation for property taken from the Creek Indians, before the British authorities determine that she doesn't have the authority to speak for the tribe.
- August 15 – Four Russian sailors— Aleksei Inkov, Khrisanf Inkov, Stepan Sharapov and Fedor Verigin— are rescued after having been marooned on the Arctic Ocean island of Edgeøya for more than six years. They are the only survivors of a crew of 14 whose koch had been blown off course in May 1743 and then broken up by ice. The four are returned home on September 28.
- August 19 – At a ceremony in San Antonio, Texas (then a part of the New Spain province of Nuevo Santander), four Apache chiefs and Spanish colonial officials and missionaries literally "bury the hatchet", placing weapons of war into a pit and covering it as a symbol that the Apaches and the Spaniards will fight no further war against each other.
- September 5 – A delegation of 33 members of the Catawba Indian nation and 73 from the Cherokee nation arrive in Charleston, South Carolina, to discuss a peace treaty with South Carolina's provincial governor, James Glen.
- September 12 – The first recorded game of baseball is played, by Frederick, Prince of Wales, at Kingston upon Thames in England.
- September 23 – Grand Chief Jean-Baptiste Cope, of the Miꞌkmaq Indian nation in Canada, declares war against the British Empire after the building of the fort at Halifax, Nova Scotia and begins hostilities by taking 20 British hostages at Canso.
- September 28 – Three Russian survivors of the shipwreck on Edgeøya return to their homeland after more than six years, as the ship Nikolai i Andrei brings them to the port of Arkhangelsk. A fourth survivor, Fedor Veriginare, died of scurvy during the six-week voyage home.

=== October–December ===
- October 2 – Edward Cornwallis, the British Governor of Nova Scotia, commands his militia and local citizens "to annoy, distress, take or destroy the Savage commonly called Micmac, wherever they are found" and promises a reward of ten guineas (21 British shillings) for every Mi'kmaq scalp brought in.
- October 4 – What is later described as "the least examined yet most influential" of clerical reforms, by the Spanish Bourbon monarchs of the 18th century, begins when King Ferdinand VI approves a royal cédula, removing control of the Roman Catholic parishes of Latin America from religious orders. Henceforward, jurisdiction over parishioners in the archdioceses of Lima, Mexico City and Bogotá is with the secular clergy.
- October 16 – At Falmouth, a part of the British Province of Massachusetts Bay that would later be the site of Portland, Maine, a peace treaty is signed between representatives of Massachusetts Bay and 19 sagamores and tribal chiefs of the Wabanaki Confederacy (encompassing the Penobscot, Kennebec, Odanak and Wôlinak tribes of the Abenaki Indians), temporarily settling territorial disputes in Maine during King George's War.
- October 19 – Two months after Pierre Céloron begins his inspection of the Ohio territory on behalf of France, Christopher Gist starts his survey of the lands along the right bank of the Ohio River on behalf of the British grant to the Ohio Company.
- November 9 – Battle of Penfui on Timor: A large Topass army is defeated by a numerically inferior Dutch East India Company.
- November 12 – In response to the increasing number of starving people moving into Paris from rural parts of France, King Louis XV issues an ordinance that "all the beggars and vagabonds who shall be found either in the streets of Paris, or in churches or church doorways, or in the countryside around Paris, of whatever age or sex, shall be arrested and conducted into prisons, to stay there as long as shall be necessary."
- November 24 – The Province of South Carolina House of Assembly votes to free African-American slave Caesar Norman, and to grant him a lifetime pension of 100 British pounds per year, in return for Caesar's agreement to share the secret of his antidote for poisonous snake venom. Caesar then makes public his herbal cure of juice from Plantago major (the common plantain) and Marrubium vulgare (horehound), combined with "a leaf of good tobacco moistened with rum".
- December 1 – Sultan Azim ud-Din I, recently forced to flee to Manila after being driven from the throne of Sultanate of Sulu elsewhere in the Philippine Islands, announces his intention to convert from Sunni Islam to become baptized as a Christian within the Roman Catholic Church. He changes his name to Fernando after being baptized.
- December 5 – French composer Jean-Philippe Rameau premieres his new opera, Zoroastre, at the Théâtre du Palais-Royal in Paris, but the first version is not a success. After five years of rewriting, Rameau will revive Zoroastre on January 19, 1756 and the opera will continue to be performed more than two centuries later.
- December 7 – Father Junípero Serra begins his missionary work in the New World, 100 days after departing on a voyage from Spain and a day after his arrival at Veracruz in Mexico. During the period from 1769 to 1782, Serra will be the founder of nine missions in the Province of Las Californias, including the sites around which future California cities will be built, including Mission Basilica San Diego de Alcalá in 1769 and Mission San Francisco de Asís in 1776.
- December 30 – Mir Sayyid Muhammad, a grandson of the Shah Suleiman I of Persia, overthrows Shahrokh Shah to become the Shah of Persia, and briefly restores the Safavid dynasty as Suleiman II; his reign ends less than three months later, on March 20, when Kurdish tribesmen restore Shahrokh to the throne.

=== Date unknown ===
- A census is conducted in Finland.
- The land reform of the Great Partition begins in Sweden, and continues until the 19th century.

== Births ==
- January 13 – Friedrich Müller, German painter, narrator, lyricist and dramatist (d. 1825)
- January 16 – Vittorio Alfieri, Italian dramatist (d. 1803)
- January 24 – Charles James Fox, English politician (d. 1806)
- January 29 – King Christian VII of Denmark (d. 1808)
- March 9 – Honoré Gabriel Riqueti, comte de Mirabeau, French politician (d. 1791)
- March 10 – Lorenzo Da Ponte, Italian librettist (d. 1838)

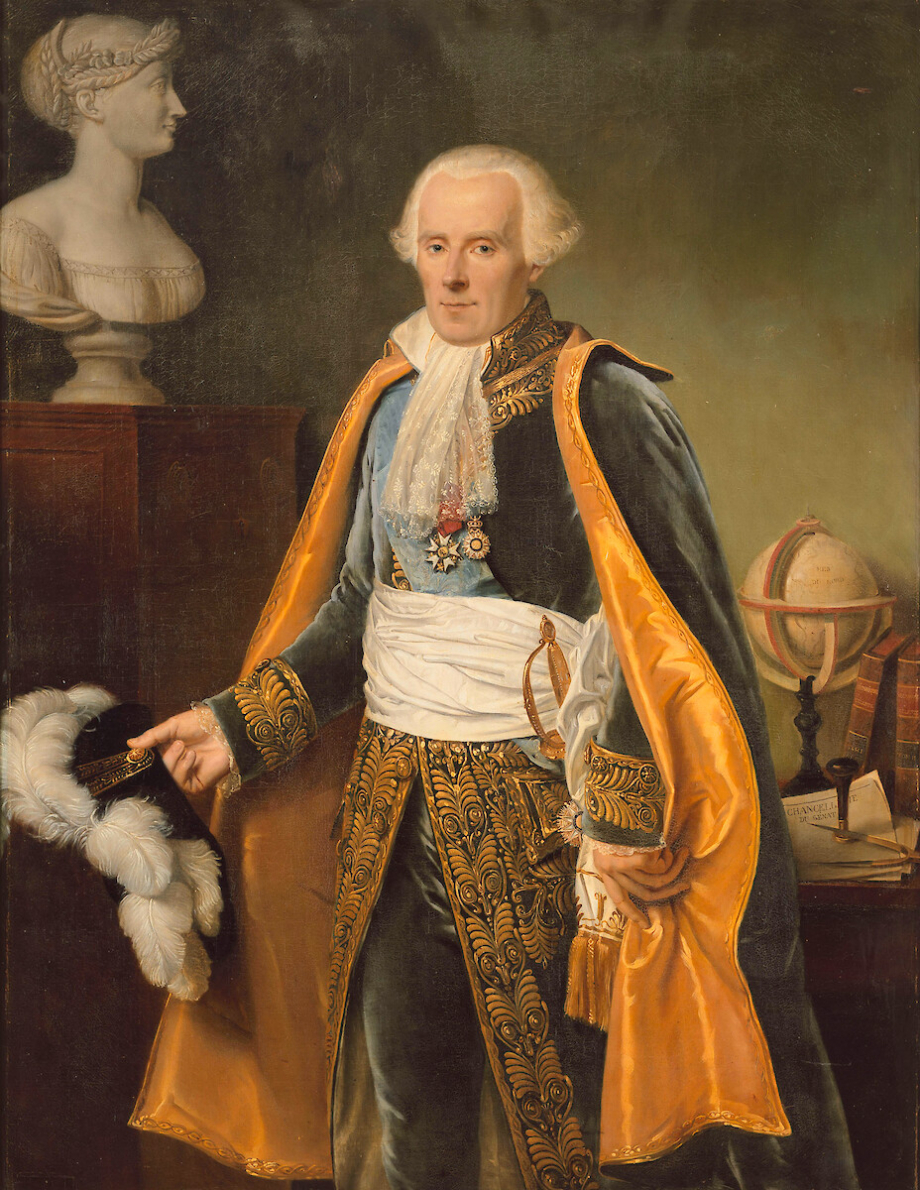
Pierre Simon de Laplace

- March 23 – Pierre-Simon Laplace, French mathematician, astronomer (d. 1827)
- March 23 – Ulla von Höpken, Swedish courtier, influential socialite (d. 1810)
- May 17 – Edward Jenner, English physician (d. 1823)
- April 11 – Adélaïde Labille-Guiard, French portrait painter (d. 1803)
- June 15 – Georg Joseph Vogler, German composer (d. 1814)
- June 19 – Jean-Marie Collot d'Herbois, French revolutionary (d. 1796)
- July 16 – Cyrus Griffin, last American President of the Continental Congress (d. 1810)

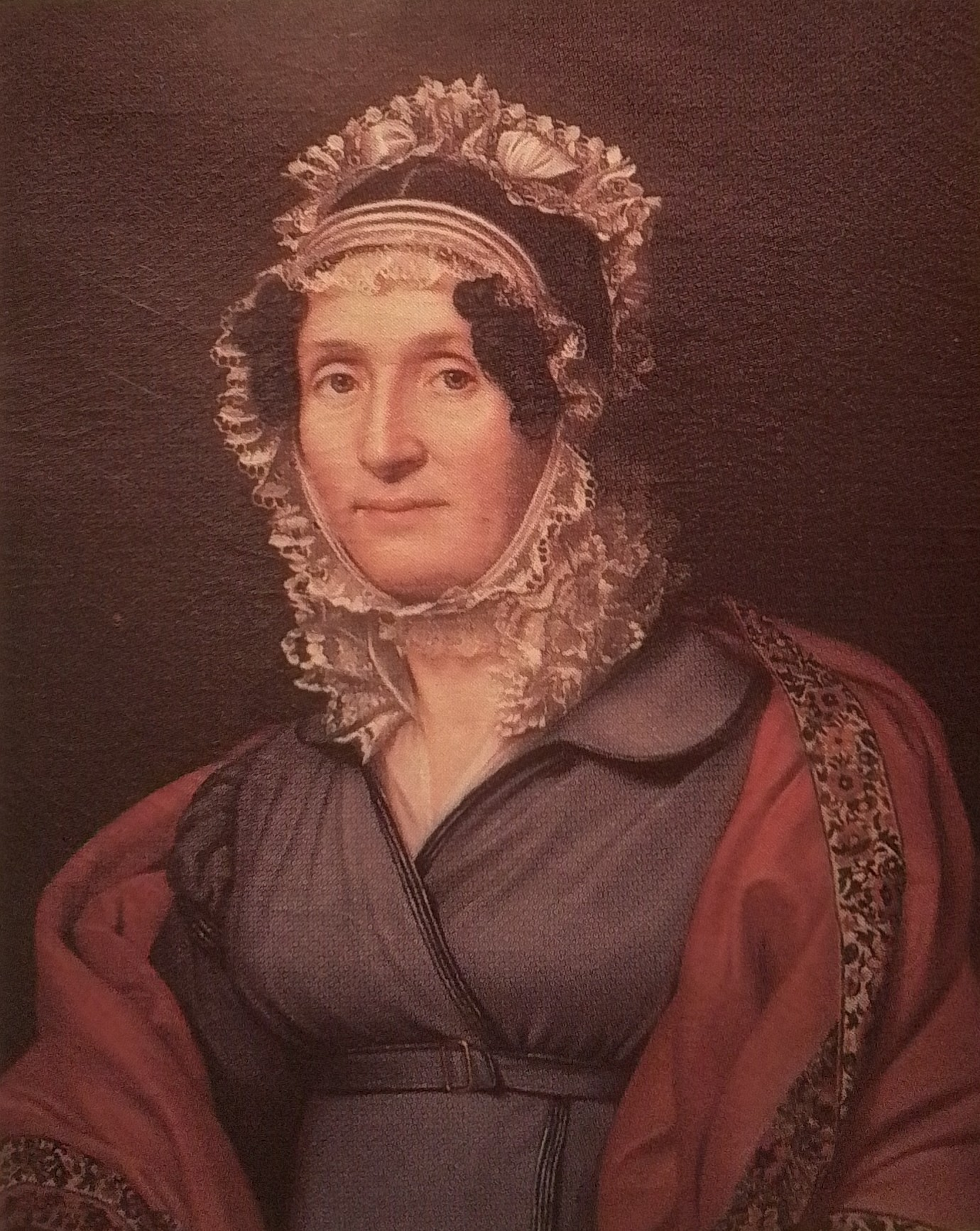
Madame Mère

- August 24 – Madame Mère (Letizia Ramolino Bonaparte) mother of Napoleon I (d. 1836)

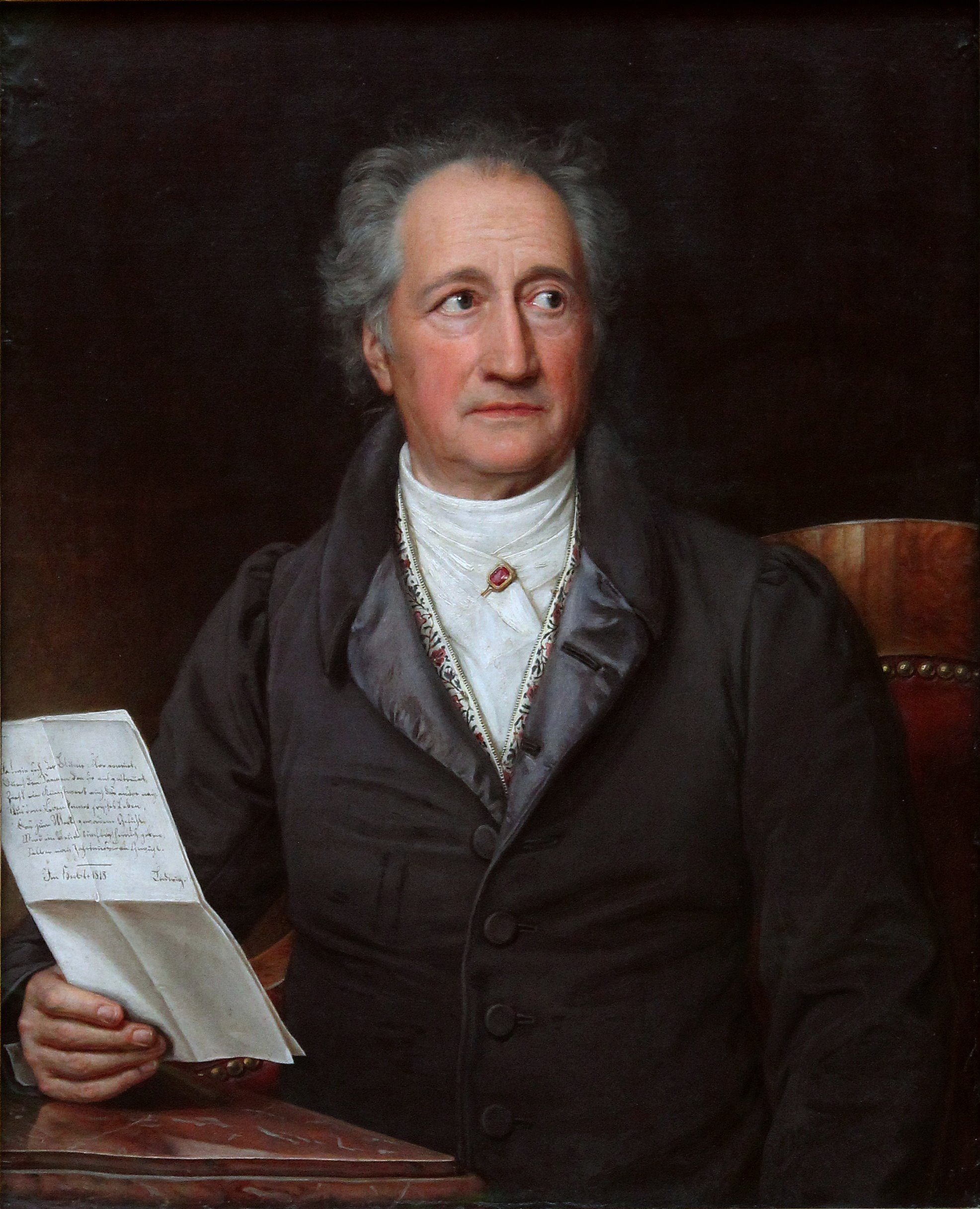
Johann Wolfgang von Goethe

- August 28 – Johann Wolfgang von Goethe, German writer and politician (d. 1832)
- September 25 – Abraham Gottlob Werner, German geologist (d. 1817)
- September 30 – Comte Siméon Joseph Jérôme, French jurist and politician (d. 1842)
- October 25 – Erik Magnus Staël von Holstein, Swedish ambassador (d. 1802)
- November 3 – Daniel Rutherford, Scottish physician, chemist and botanist (d. 1819)
- November 17 – Nicolas Appert French inventor (d. 1841)
- November 23 – Edward Rutledge, American statesman (d. 1800)
- December 2 – Elisabeth Berenberg, German banker (d. 1809)
- December 17 – Domenico Cimarosa, Italian composer (d. 1801)
- December 24 – Karl Gottfried Hagen, German chemist (d. 1829)
- December 25 – Samuel Jackson Pratt (known as Courtney Melmoth), English writer, poet and actor (d. 1814)
- date unknown – Charlotte Melmoth, British & American actress (d. 1823)

== Deaths ==
- February 1 – Françoise Marie de Bourbon, youngest daughter of Louis XIV (b. 1677)
- February 8 – Jan van Huysum, Dutch painter (b. 1682)
- February 11 – Philip Livingston, American politician (b. 1686)
- April 14 – Balthasar Denner, German artist (b. 1685)
- May 11 – Catharine Trotter Cockburn, English novelist, dramatist, and philosopher (b. 1674)
- May 28 – Pierre Subleyras, French painter (b. 1699)
- June 18 – Ambrose Philips, English poet (b. 1675)
- July 1 – William Jones, Welsh mathematician (b. 1675)
- July 12
  - Charles de la Boische, Marquis de Beauharnois, Governor of New France (b. c.1671)
  - George Carpenter, 2nd Baron Carpenter of England (b. 1702)
- July 23 – Ingeborg i Mjärhult, Swedish soothsayer (b. 1665)
- August 13 – Johann Elias Schlegel, German critic, poet (b. 1719)
- August 29 – Matthias Bel, Hungarian pastor, polymath (b. 1684)

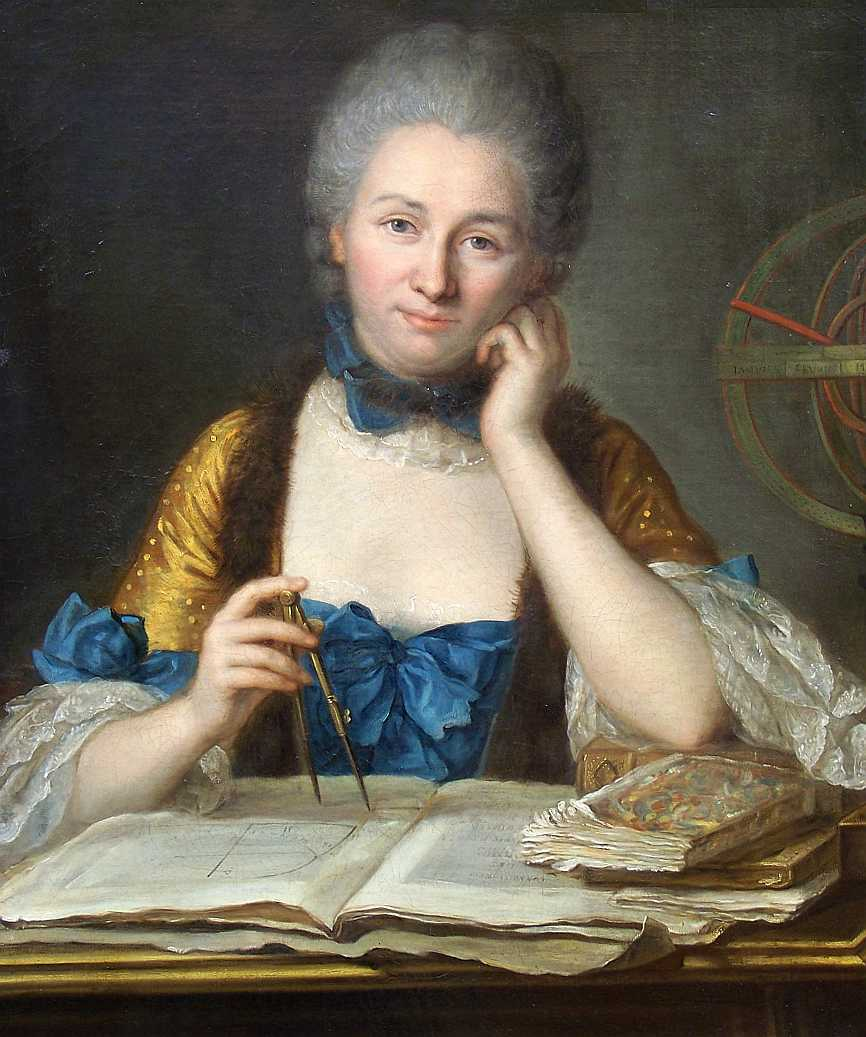
Émilie du Châtelet

- September 10 – Émilie du Châtelet, French mathematician, physicist (b. 1706)
- September 14 – Richard Temple, 1st Viscount Cobham, English soldier, politician (b. 1675)
- October 4 – Baron Franz von der Trenck, Austrian soldier (b. 1711)
- October 9 – Luís da Cunha, Ambassador of Portugal (b. 1662)
- November 14 – Maruyama Gondazaemon, Japanese sumo wrestler (b. 1713)
- November 19 – Carl Heinrich Biber, German violinist and composer (b. 1681)
- December 4 – Claudine Guérin de Tencin, French salon holder (b. 1682)
- December 5 – Pierre Gaultier de Varennes, sieur de La Vérendrye, French-Canadian explorer and trader (b. 1685)
- December 19 – Francesco Antonio Bonporti, Italian priest and composer (b. 1672)
- December 25 – John Lindsay, 20th Earl of Crawford, British Army general (b. 1702)
- date unknown – Maria Oriana Galli-Bibiena, Italian painter (b. 1656)
