= Sonbai Besar =

Sonbai Besar or Greater Sonbai was an extensive princedom of West Timor, in present-day Indonesia, which existed from 1658 to 1906 and played an important role in the history of Timor.

== Origins of the polity ==
The origins of the princedom are intimately connected with the struggle between the Dutch and the Portuguese for mastery of the island. The united Sonbai (Sonba'i, Sonnebay) realm, the traditionally most prestigious polity among the Atoni people of West Timor, allied with the Portuguese in 1649-1655, and then with the Dutch East India Company (Vereenigde Oost-Indische Compagnie or VOC) in 1655-1658. After a series of defeats at the hands of the Portuguese Eurasians or Topasses in 1657-1658, Sonbai broke up in two parts. One group migrated to Kupang where the Dutch had their base, where they formed the Sonbai Kecil princedom. Another group, Sonbai Besar, stayed in the inland of West Timor under Portuguese surveillance.

== Traditional rulership ==
The Sonbai Besar congregation was headed by a ruler known to the Europeans as emperor (keizer, emperador). He was also known as Atupas (he who sleeps), Neno Anan (son of heaven) and Liurai (surpassing the earth). The other Atoni rulers related themselves to him in symbolic kinship terms, which was anchored through various origin stories. In accordance with Timorese custom, the ruler was an inactive, in a symbolical sense "female" (feto) figure. At his side was a "male" (mone) executive regent of the Kono family, called Uis Kono or Ama Kono. Because of this arrangement, the princedom was often known under the name Amakono. The Uis Kono in particular governed the north-eastern part of the realm, later known as Miomaffo. The central area, Mollo, was governed by co-regents of the Oematan family, and in Fatuleu further to the west a number of lesser lords dominated, among them Takaip. Under the major lords (usif) were the amaf naek (great fathers) who headed various districts, and under them the amaf (fathers) in the various villages.

== Defection from the Portuguese ==
The relation between the Topasses and the Sonbai Besar princedom oscillated between cooperation and hostility, and did not entail a colonial rule in the conventional sense. The lords of the princedom delivered sandalwood to the coast where it was picked up by Portuguese and other vessels, and brought to Batavia or Macao. There were large-scale conflicts with the Topasses in 1711-1713 and 1722. In 1748 the Sonbai ruler Alfonso Salema and the Atoni kings of Amfoan and Amanuban rebelled and then fled to the Dutch in Kupang. Alfonso Salema brought with him a large part of his followers. This was a major catalyst for a full-scale confrontation between the VOC post in Kupang and the Topass leader Gaspar da Costa. In the Battle of Penfui in November 1749 the attacking Topass army was crushed by the VOC-affiliated forces of Kupang, and a large part of West Timor fell under Dutch influence.

== Relations with the Dutch ==
The relation between Sonbai Besar and its new Dutch suzerain turned to become conflict-ridden. Alfonso Salema was deposed and exiled by the VOC in 1752 on suspicion of treason, and in 1782 his grandson Alphonsus Adrianus established his authority in the inland independently of the Europeans. After his death in 1802 his son and successor Nai Sobe Sonbai II had great difficulties maintaining his position, and slowly had to assemble power anew under a long and troubled rule (1808-1867). There was an open state of warfare with the Dutch in Kupang in 1847-1850 and 1855-1857, without the colonial authorities being able to come to grips with the emperor. After his decease the Sonbai Besar realm began to dissolve, this time irreversibly. Miomaffo, Mollo and the lordships of Fatuleu made their own contracts with the Dutch colonial authorities. The last emperor, Nai Sobe Sonbai III (r. 1885-1906) was little more than a pretender. After an incident he was pursued and captured by a Dutch troop in early 1906. Nai Sobe Sonbai III was banished to Sumba and later died on Timor in 1922. In modern West Timor he is considered an anti-colonial hero and is honoured with a monument in central Kupang.

== List of rulers ==
- Ama Tuan (Ama Utang) c. 1650 – c. 1680
- Dom Afonso da Costa c. 1680 – c. 1695 (son)
- Dom Pedro Sonbai (Tomenu) c. 1695 – 1748 (grandson of Ama Tuan)
- Dom Alfonso Salema (Nai Bau Sonbai) 1748 – 1752 (son)
- Don Bernardo (Nai Sobe Sonbai I?) 1752 – 1760 (son)
- Albertus Johannes Taffy (Nai Tafin Sonbai) 1760 – 1768 (brother)
- Alphonsus Adrianus (Nai Kau Sonbai) 1768 – 1819 (son)
- Nai Sobe Sonbai II 1819 – 1867(son)
- Nai Bau Sonbai 1867 – 1885 (son)
- Nai Nasu Mollo co-emperor 1870 – 1885 (cousin)
- Nai Sobe Sonbai III 1885 – 1906 (son of Nai Sobe Sonbai II)
