= Sonbai Kecil =

Atoni princedom in West Timor

Sonbai Kecil or Lesser Sonbai was an Atoni princedom in West Timor, now included in Indonesia. It existed from 1658 to 1917, when it merged into a colonial creation, the zelfbesturend landschap Kupang.

== Migration to Kupang ==
Sonbai Kecil was originally a breakaway group from the united Sonbai (Sonba'i, Sonnebay) realm that dominated large parts of West Timor. The creation of the princedom was connected with the colonial rivalries of 17th century Indonesia. Sonbai allied with the Dutch East India Company (VOC) against the Portuguese in 1655. The VOC had a post in Kupang in the far west since 1653 and was engaged in warfare with Portugal, whose dominions included Larantuka on Flores and Lifau on the north coast of Timor.

Part of the conflict was rivalry over the white sandalwood (santalum album), a precious item that grew in certain quantities on Timor. After a series of defeats at the hands of the Portuguese from 1657 to 1658, a part of the Sonbai congregation migrated to the Dutch stronghold in Kupang together with another VOC-allied group, Amabi. Another part remained in the inland under Portuguese surveillance, and became the Sonbai Besar princedom. The Kupang area was inhabited by the Helong people, but the newcomers were settled close to the Dutch fort without serious conflict with the original inhabitants.

== Colonial cooperation ==
The Sonbai Kecil, Helong and Amabi groups were later joined by two further groups from north-western Timor, Amfoan (1683) and Taebenu (1688). These five congregations posed as loyal allies to the VOC, while the rest of Timor largely fell under the influence of the Portuguese Eurasians or Topasses. Up to 1749, the five allies lived in a state of low-scale hostility with the neighboring clients of the Topasses, in particular the princedom Amarasi.

Sonbai Kecil was headed by a ruler known in Dutch records as emperor (keizer). In the official Dutch ranking, he was second in rank after the Helong ruler. In the Timorese political tradition, however, he was a non-active, in a symbolic sense "female" (feto) figure who was not expected to handle the actual affairs of the princedom. Actual governance was done by two executive regents who were "male" (mone) in relation to the ruler. They belonged to the mutually related Saubaki and Loewis families and usually cooperated closely with the Dutch authorities.

The seat of the ruler after c. 1740 was Bakunase, several kilometers south of the centre of Kupang, on the top of a steep hill overlooking the Kupang Bay.

== Political development after 1749 ==
The Topass attacked Kupang in 1749, but were decisively defeated by the VOC forces and their allies in the Battle of Penfui. After this event, a number of Timorese princedoms submitted to the VOC, so that the state of semi-siege of the Kupang area vanished. From 1776 to 1782, an abortive attempt was made to merge Sonbai Kecil with its sister realm Sonbai Besar in the interior, which in the meantime had fallen under Dutch influence. This arrangement failed badly, since the young ruler Alphonsus Adrianus hastily left Kupang in 1782 after intrigues against his person. After this the two Sonbai congregations remained divided.

A side-branch of the ruling family, Nisnoni ("golden teeth"), came to power. The first of the line, Baki Bena, was visited by Captain William Bligh of the Bounty Mutiny, during the latter's stay in Kupang in 1789. The Nisnonis headed their congregation throughout the 19th century although the significance of the princedom seems to have dwindled somewhat. The territory included an area south of Kupang, to the south coast, but the borders with the other small princedoms in the Kupang area were ill-defined. The ruler Isu Nisnoni was killed by a sniper from Amabi in 1889, although the colonial authorities successfully prevented a confrontation between the two princedoms.

== Colonial reorganization ==
In the early years of the 20th century, the Dutch implemented a real colonial rule in West Timor, and shortly after this they rationalized local governance in Kupang.

In 1917, Sonbai Kecil, Amabi, Amabi-Oefetto, Kupang-Helong, Taebenu and Funai were merged into a larger self-ruling territory (zelfbesturend landschap) called Kupang (not including the town itself). From 1918, it was headed by a raja of the Nisnoni family, Nicolaas Isu Nisnoni. Under him were five fettors or district rulers. In 1930, his sphere of power was increased with Fatuleu, a princedom further to the east. Kupang was occupied by the Japanese in early 1942, who led a hard regime. Towards the end of their rule, Nicolaas Isu Nisnoni stepped down in favor of his son Alfonsus Nisnoni (r. 1945–1955).

== Revolution and independence ==
Shortly afterwards, the Dutch troops returned, at the same time as the Indonesian Revolution commenced. Alfonsus Nisnoni led the local branch of Persatoean Demokrasi Indonesia, an association which aimed at eventual independence for Indonesia. He still chose to cooperate with the Dutch authorities, and in 1947, the town area of Kupang (vierkante paal) was incorporated in the zelfbesturend landschap Kupang.

After the achievement of Indonesian independence in 1949, the council of Timorese rajas (Dewan Raja-Raja) agreed to gradually abolish the traditional administrative functions of the rajas. President Sukarno paid a visit to West Timor in 1950 and was received by Alfonsus Nisnoni on arrival to Kupang. In 1955, the raja rule ended in Kupang, and the Nisnoni family withdrew to the role of adat (customary) leaders and local government officials.

== List of rulers ==
- Ama Tuan Jr. 1659–1672 (son of Ama Tuan the Elder of Sonbai Besar)
- Bi Sonbai (Usi Tetu Utang) 1672–1717 (daughter) "empress (keizerin)"
- Bernardus de Leeuw 1717–1726 (son of a cousin)
- Corneo Leeuw 1728–1748 (brother)
- Daniel Taffy 1748–1760 (brother)
- Jacobus Albertus Taffy 1760–1776 (nephew)
- Alphonsus Adrianus of Sonbai Besar 1776–1782
- Baki Bena (Bernardus Nisnoni) 1776/82–1795 (brother of Jacobus Albertus Taffy)
- Dirk Hendrik Aulasi 1795–1798
- Nube Bena (Pieter Nisnoni I) 1798–1821 (brother of Baki Bena)
- Isu Baki Sonbai after 1821 (son of Baki Bena)
- Ote Nuben Nisnoni mentioned 1828–1833 (grandson of Nube Bena)
- Babkas Nube (Pieter Nisnoni II) ?–1839 (son of Nube Bena)
- Meis Babkas Nisnoni 1839–1860 (son)
- Pieter Messi Nisnoni 1860–1874 (son)
- Isu Nisnoni 1875–1889 (brother)
- Said Meis Nisnoni 1890–1902 (son)
- Baki Bastiaan Meis Nisnoni 1905–1911 (brother)
- Nicolaas Isu Nisnoni 1911–1917, of Kupang 1918–1945 (brother)
- Alfonsus Nisnoni, of Kupang 1945–1955 (son)
