= Liurai =

Title in Timorese nobility

Liurai is a ruler's title on Timor. The word is Tetun and literally means "surpassing the earth". It was originally associated with Wehali, a ritually central kingdom situated at the south coast of central Timor (now included in Indonesia). The sacral lord of Wehali, the Maromak Oan ("son of God") enjoyed a ritually passive role, and he kept the liurai as the executive ruler of the land. In the same way, the rulers of two other important princedoms, Sonbai in West Timor and Likusaen (Liquica) in East Timor, were often referred as liurais, which indicated a symbolic tripartition of the island. In later history, especially in the nineteenth and twentieth centuries, the term liurai underwent a process of inflation. By this time it denoted any ruler in the Portuguese part of Timor, great or small. In the Dutch part in West Timor the title appears to have been restricted to the Sonbai and Wehali rulers. The rulers in the west were known by the Malay term raja, while there were internally used terms such as usif (lord) among the Dawan-speaking groups, and loro (sun) among the Tetun speakers.

The role of the liurais underwent changes after the great Boaventura Rebellion which was suppressed by the Portuguese authorities in 1912. Up to then they were by and large traditional rulers in whose realms the colonial authorities seldom interfered. However, after this date the liurai was often appointed because of his loyal stance and connections with the colonial center in Dili. The liurai families have kept a certain role in Timorese society until recent times, and a few scions have enjoyed nationwide political roles. The liurais do not have any official rank any more, but still tend to command a degree of local respect.

== See also ==
- List of rulers of Timor
- History of East Timor

== Bibliography ==
- Castro, Affonso de (1867), As possesões Portuguezas na Oceania. Lisboa: Imprensa Nacional.
- Geoffrey C. Gunn (2011), Historical dictionary of East Timor. Lanham: Scarecrow Press.
- S. Müller (1857), Reizen en onderzoekingen in den Indischen Archipel, Vol. II. Amsterdam: Muller.
- H. G. Schulte Nordholt (1971), The Political System of the Atoni of Timor. The Hague: M. Nijhoff.
- Tom Therik (2004), Wehali, the Female Land: Traditions of a Timorese Ritual Centre. ANU: Pandanus Books.
