= Gaspar da Costa =

Gaspar da Costa (d. Penfui, West Timor, 9 November 1749) was the leader or tenente geral (lieutenant general) of the Portuguese-speaking Topasses, a Eurasian group that dominated much of the politics on Timor in the early modern period. He was largely responsible for the dramatic collapse of Portuguese power in West Timor, a process that laid the foundations for the modern division of Timor in an Indonesian and an independent part.

== Political rise ==
His exact parentage is not known, but he might have been the son of the former tenente general Domingos da Costa (d. 1722). He appeared as tenente general in 1732, shortly after the conclusion of a treaty between the Topasses and the official Portuguese governor of Timor. There had been a state of intermittent warfare between the two Portuguese factions since 1702, but during the time of Gaspar da Costa, there was a lull in the hostilities. He supported the foundation of a priest seminar on Timor, but at the same time dominated large parts of Timor without caring about the governor. His main seat of residence was Animata in the present Oecussi-Ambeno enclave, close to Lifau at the north coast, where the governor resided. Animata was described as an extensive settlement with circa 1,800 houses.

== The son of Gaspar da Costa ==
In 1748, Gaspar da Costa sent his eldest son, Baltazar, together with a Dominican priest to France for educational purposes. In the next year, the boy and his preceptor arrived in Lorient in France. The priest, however, disappeared with the goods and left Baltazar to fend for himself. The latter pursued the rest of his life as a ship's cook and a humble relief-seeker. His plight was noted by some French persons of standing, who presented him to the public as the "Prince of Timor", but Baltazar eventually died poor and forgotten, sometime after 1778.

== The Battle of Penfui ==
Gaspar da Costa's relations with the Dutch colonizers in Kupang in westernmost Timor were generally poor. In 1735, a Topass army seriously threatened Kupang, and in 1746-49 the Topasses intervened on the Island of Roti, a Dutch dependency close to Timor. In 1748, a number of Timorese princedoms in West Timor, who were usually clients of the Portuguese, turned rebellious against Gaspar da Costa. As the Topass forces fought back, many Timorese refugees headed for Kupang and the Dutch, who sympathized with the rebels. Especially, the ruler of the prestigious Sonbai princedom joined the Dutch with the bulk of his followers. Gaspar da Costa raised a comprehensive army consisting of Topasses and levies from the various Timorese princedoms still under his control. The Dutch calculated it to be 20,000 men or even more. The professed aim of Gaspar da Costa was to bring the fugitives back and to eliminate the Dutch garrison in Kupang.

The Topass-Timorese army camped at Penfui, at present-day El Tari Airport east of Kupang, where they made fortifications of stone and earth. On 9 November 1749, the Dutch sent out a multi-ethnic force consisting of Europeans, Solorese, Sawunese, Rotinese, mardijkers (non-whites in Dutch service), Timorese, etc. In the ensuing Battle of Penfui, they attacked the fortifications of Gaspar da Costa with success. The weakness of his large but non-uniform army became apparent as big contingents fled the field at the beginning of the battle. When Gaspar da Costa attempted to leave the battlefield on horseback, he was pierced by a Timorese spear, while his followers were slaughtered in the thousands. The Topass defeat meant that the Dutch were able to extend their sphere of influence to most of West Timor during the following decade. In this way, the battle laid the ground for the colonial division of Timor into halves, which was solidified in the nineteenth century, with consequences until today.
