= Amabi =

Former country

Amabi was a traditional principality in West Timor in the currently East Nusa Tenggara province of Indonesia. From at least the 17th century to 1917, Amabi played a role in the rivalries between the Portuguese and Dutch colonials on Timor Island.

== History ==
According to traditional accounts, the dynastic line of Amabi was related to the leading West Timorese kingdom of Sonbai, and to the Tetun kingdom of Wehali in south-central Timor. Through the effort of Dominican missionary in the early 17th century, it was tied to Portuguese interests on Timor. In 1655, however, the king of Amabi, together with that of Sonbai, switched sides and made an alliance with the Dutch East India Company (VOC), which had established itself in Kupang two years previously. The Dutch and their new allies soon proved particularly unsuccessful against the Portuguese clients on Timor. In the fall of 1657 the king of Amabi was killed by the latter at the battle of Gunung Mollo in the interior of West Timor. In September 1658 a large part of the Amabi population fled to Kupang in order to escape their enemies, and were permitted by the Dutch to settle close to the European fort. Part of the population stayed in the interior. This congregation, Amabi Oefeto, was subjected to the Amarasi principality, which in turn was a vassal of Portugal.

The Amabi community of refugee turned out to be loyal subordinated allies of the VOC. Together with the principalities of Kupang, Sonbai Kecil, Amfoan and Taebenu, they constituted the backbone of Dutch strategy on Timor. During much of the 17th and 18th centuries they waged small-scale warfare against the Portuguese client principalities, in particular Amarasi. This role was less crucial after 1749, when the Portuguese grip on West Timor was lost. Still, in the late 19th century Amabi was considered the most powerful among the local allies of the Dutch colonial government. When the Dutch implemented full control over the inland territories of West Timor in the early 20th century, the protective role of the small Amabi principality became obscure. Through an administrative reorganization, Amabi was merged with four other principalities in 1917, into the zelfbesturend landschap (self-ruling territory) of Kupang. Up to 1962, the ex-ruler of Amabi held the function of fettor (sub-ruler) of his old lands. In that year, the Indonesian republican government definitely abolished the system of hereditary princes. In 1949, the population of Amabi stood at 10,767 persons.

=== List of rulers ===
- Sebastião mentioned 1652
- Saroro Neno mentioned 1655
- Ama Kefi Meu 1666-1704
- Ama Kefi 1704-1725 (son)
- Loti 1725-1732 (son)
- Nai Balas 1732-1755 (brother)
- Balthazar Loti 1755-1790 (son of Loti)
- Osu I 1791-1795 (son)
- Slolo 1795-c. 1797
- Afu Balthazar c. 1797-before 1824
- Arnoldus Adriaan Karel Loti before 1824-1834 (son)
- Osu II 1834-1859 (brother)
- Mano 1859-1883 (nephew)
- Lelo 1884-1894 (son)
- Kusa 1895-1901 (second cousin)
- Arnoldus 1901 (son of Lelo)
- Junus Amtaran 1901-1903
- Kase Kome 1903-1912 (nephew of Osu II)
- Jacob Ch. Amabi 1912-1917 (son)
