= Sonbai =

Indonesian princely dynasty

Sonbai (also spelt Sonnebay, Sonba'i, or Sonbait) was an Indonesian princely dynasty that reigned over various parts of West Timor from at least the 17th century until the 1950s. It was known as the most prestigious princedom of the Atoni people of West Timor, and is the subject of many myths and stories.

According to most legends, Sonbai originated from Wehali in the Tetun-speaking central parts of Timor, the classical political and cultural centre of gravitation on Timor. The ancestor of the line, who was a brother of the Liurai (ruler) of Wehali, migrated to the highlands of West Timor, where he married a daughter of a local Atoni lord, Kune, and inherited his lands. The various Atoni principalities tended to relate themselves genealogically to Sonbai, although they did not acknowledge him politically as their lord. Other legends assert that the first Sonbai descended from the sky.

Historically, Sonbai is documented in European colonial sources since 1649. At that time it was a politically expansive realm which allied with the Portuguese, who had by this time started to establish their direct influence on Timor. In 1655 Sonbai switched sides and made a contract with the Dutch East Indies Company (VOC), the enemies of the Portuguese colonialists. Serious defeats in 1657–58 at the hands of the Portuguese Topasses, led to a division of the realm. One part of the Sonbai population migrated to Kupang, where the Dutch kept a fort since 1653. This group, known as Lesser Sonbai (Sonbai Kecil), was one of the so-called five loyal allies of the Dutch, together with the princes of Kupang-Helong, Amabi, Amfoan and Taebenu. This group was finally merged with other principalities to form the larger zelfbesturend landschap (self-ruling territory) of Kupang in 1917. The new Kupang principality was governed by members of the Nisnoni family, a side-branch of Sonbai, surviving the Japanese occupation of the Dutch East Indies in 1942-45 and the Indonesian Revolution in 1945–49. Its population was 49,168 inhabitants in 1949. In 1955 the new Indonesian republic ended the rule of governing princes (raja) in Kupang.

In the interior of West Timor, a Sonbai principality remained under Portuguese suzerainty after 1658. The rulers, known to the Europeans as "emperor (keizer, imperador)", usually had an inactive role, while the executive governance was done by their main lieutenants of the Kono family. Therefore, the inland principality was often known as Amakono (Ama = father). The realm was also known as Greater Sonbai (Sonbai Besar). In 1748-49 the ruler of Greater Sonbai defected from Portugal and escaped to Kupang, submitting to the Dutch. Later on, in 1782, the Greater Sonbai congregation again broke with the Dutch and re-established an autonomous realm in the interior. It approximately covered the regions Fatuleu, Mollo and Miomaffo. After 1867 this realm began to break up, as minor rajas asserted their independence. The last pretender-ruler was captured by Dutch colonial troops in 1906, bringing a definite end to the principality.

The Dutch and Portuguese gave the rulers of the Sonbai Besar and Sonbai Kecil the lofty title of 'emperor' (keizer, imperador), which indicates that the two colonial powers both understood the importance of maintaining control over the ritually prestigious princes.

== Sources ==
- H. Hägerdal (2007), 'Rebellions or Factionalism?', Bijdragen tot de Taal-, Land- en Volkenkunde 163:1, pp. 1–33.
- P. Middelkoop (1938), 'Iets over Sonba'i, het bekende vorstengeslacht in Timor', Tijdschrift voor Indische Taal-, Land- en Volkenkunde 78, pp. 392–509.
- A. de Roever (2002), De jacht op sandelhout: De VOC en de tweedeling van Timor in de zeventiende eeuw, Zutphen: Walburg Pers.
- H.G. Schulte Nordholt (1971), The Political System of the Atoni of Timor, The Hague: M. Nijhoff.
- F.A.E. van Wouden (1968), Types of Social Structures in Eastern Indonesia, Den Haag.
