= Amarasi =

Historical kingdom

Coordinates: 9°49′S 124°28′E

Amarasi was a traditional princedom in West Timor, in present-day Indonesia. It had an important role in the political history of Timor during the 17th and 18th century, being a client state of the Portuguese colonialists, and later subjected to the Netherlands East Indies.

== History ==
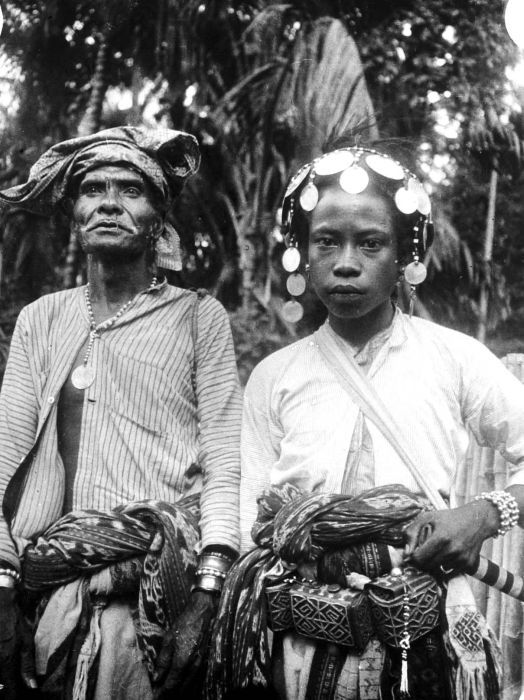
Amarasi priests, father & son

The origins of Amarasi are recounted in various legends. The oldest available version says that the dynastic line originated from Wehali, the traditional political navel of Timor in Belu. A member of a local family, Nafi Rasi, accidentally broke a valuable bowl and was forced too flee the wrath of his siblings. With his followers he went to Beboki-Insana to the north of Wehali, and thence to the south coast of West Timor.

There he founded a princedom with help of firearms that he had acquired in Beboki-Insana, which in turn lay close to the land of the Topasses (Portuguese mestizo population). Roaming groups from Belu arrived and strengthened the manpower of Nafi Rasi. In spite of its supposed Belunese origins, the population belonged to the Atoni group, speaking a dialect of Dawan.

European sources confirm that Amarasi was a powerful domain in western Timor by the early 17th century. It was influenced by Catholicism through Dominican missionaries in the 1630s, and turned an important client of the Portuguese Topasses. In consequence, Amarasi fought the Dutch East Indies Company (Vereenigde Oost-Indische Compagnie or VOC), which attempted to expand its power on Timor, attracted by the stands of commercially valuable sandalwood. A sizeable Dutch expedition led by Arnold de Vlaming van Oudshoorn (1656) was soundly defeated by Amarasi and the Topasses.

For almost a century after this event, Amarasi remained a Portuguese vassal, during much of the time fighting the Timorese clients of the VOC in the Kupang area in westernmost Timor. This was a low-scale warfare that took the form of headhunting raids. Amarasi was in fact counted as one of the principal props of Portuguese authority on Timor in this era.

=== Dutch rule ===
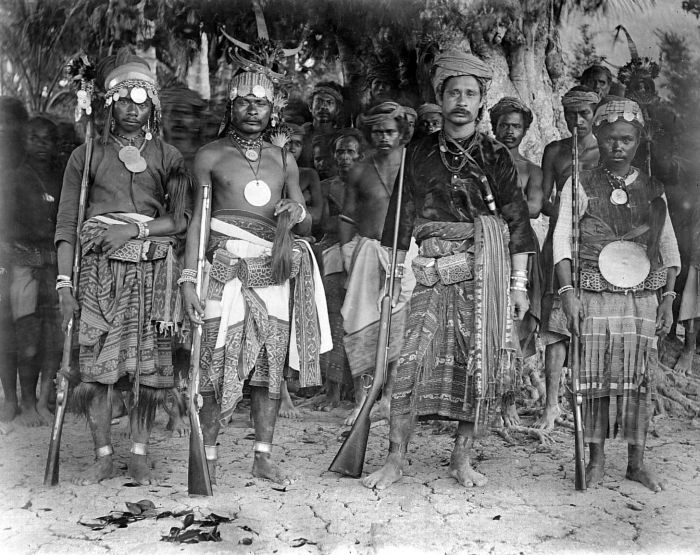
Raja of Amarasi

In 1749 the Amarasi soldiers were pushed to participate in a large-scale military campaign led by the Topasses against the Dutch in Kupang. In the resulting Battle of Penfui the Topasses were routed by the VOC forces, while Amarasi fled the field and subsequently submitted to the VOC. After a short time, in 1752, Amarasi attempted to withdraw from the new Dutch suzerainty, and rejoin the Portuguese camp. However, the princedom was badly defeated by the other Dutch clients, its king committed suicide and a large part of the manpower was killed or enslaved. The remaining Amarasi congregation was allowed after some years to settle in its old lands. From this point, the weakened princedom remained attached to Dutch interests until the 1940s.

By the 1820s, Amarasi consisted of three parts: Buwarein under the main ruler (Nai Jufa Naek), Talba, and Houmen, the latter two under district lords (Nai Jufa). Later in the 19th century a further division resulted in five parts. The district lords were in practice the near-equals of the central ruler or raja, and were in turn dependent on the various Amaf (local headmen). In 1930 the population of Amarasi was 16,832 people, and its area was an estimated 740 square kilometers.

=== Japanese occupation ===
During the Japanese occupation of the Dutch East Indies (1942–1945) the raja of Amarasi, H.A. Koroh, was accused of collaborating with the Japanese, who recruited comfort women and conscript labourers (romusha) from the local population. After the Japanese capitulation in 1945, the raja kept a defiant attitude against the returning Dutch authorities.

=== Indonesia ===
In the first years after the achievement of Indonesian independence in 1949, the Amarasi princedom survived as a self-ruling territory or swapraja, until 1962, when the unitary Indonesian republic abolished traditional forms of governance in this region. Today Amarasi is included in the kabupaten (regency) Kupang, and constitutes the kecamatan (districts) Amarasi, Amarasi Barat, Amarasi Selatan, and Amarasi Timur. The centre of the region is the village Baun, where the last residence of the former rajas can still be seen.

=== List of rulers ===
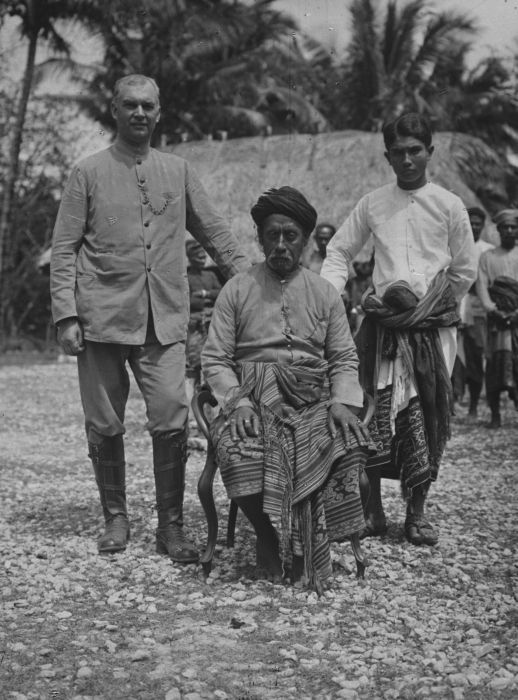
Prince Isaac Koroh in 1921

- Dom António I d. 1665
- Dom Tomás 1665-? (brother)
- Dom António II mentioned 1688
- Dom Affonco mentioned 1703
- Dom Augusto Fernandes mentioned 1703
- Nai Soti mentioned 1714
- Dom Luís Hornay before 1749-1752
- Dom Affonco Hornay 1752-1774 (son)
- Don Rote Ruatefu 1774-1802 (son)
- Kiri Lote 1803-before 1832 (son)
- Koroh Kefi before 1832-1853
- Obe Koroh 1853-1871 (nephew)
- Rasi Koroh 1872-1887 (nephew)
- Taku Obe 1888-1891 (son of Obe Koroh)
- Rasi Koroh second time, 1892–1914
- Isaac Koroh 1914-1923 (brother)
- Alexander Koroh 1923-1925 (grandson of Rasi Koroh)
- Hendrik Arnold Koroh 1925-1951 (brother)
- Viktor Koroh 1951-1962 (son)
