= Battle of Penfui =

Took place on 9 November 1749 in the hillside of Penfui, near modern Kupang

| Date | 9 November 1749 |
| Location | Penfui, modern Kupang 10.1670°S 123.6582°E |
| Result | Dutch victory |

Belligerents
| Topasses; Timorese allies | Dutch East India Company; Timorese allies |

Commanders and leaders
| Gaspar da Costa † | Ensign Christoffel Lipp |

Strength
| 20,000+ claimed (2,800 with firearms) | ~500 (exc. allies) |

Casualties and losses
| 2,000+ dead | 22 dead |

The Battle of Penfui took place on 9 November 1749 in the hillside of Penfui, near modern Kupang. A large Topass army was defeated by a numerically inferior Dutch East India Company force following the withdrawal of the former's Timorese allies from the battlefield, resulting in the death of the Topass leader Gaspar da Costa. Following the battle, both Topass and Portuguese influence on Timor declined, eventually leading to the formation of a boundary between Dutch and Portuguese Timor which precipitated into the modern border between West Timor and East Timor.

== Background ==
Following the loss of Malacca to the Dutch in 1641, the Portuguese there moved to Gowa-Kingdom of Tallo before they were expelled from there as well, forcing the remnants to move to either Dutch Batavia or Portuguese-controlled Timor and the Solor Archipelago. Portuguese presence in the region had started since 1520 when they established Lifau, and was largely represented by the Topasses – "black Portuguese" consisting of mixed European-Asian descendants, freed slaves known as Mardijkers, and some local Christians. The Topasses held significant influence in the island's politics. Relations between the "black" and "white" Portuguese communities soured at times, with open conflicts in the early 18th century as the Portuguese attempted to introduce direct rule by installing a governor. They were all subsequently removed, and there was no direct governorship from Portugal until 1748.

Portuguese forces had invaded the interior of Timor in 1642, establishing their rule over the inland polities. The Dutch East India Company (VOC) captured the Portuguese fort at Solor in 1613 and established themselves in what is today Kupang on Timor after defeating the Portuguese there in 1653. They allied with the native polities such as Sonbai and Amabi in 1655, but were defeated in ensuing conflicts. Intermittent wars and fighting occurred throughout the seventeenth and eighteenth centuries, with the Dutch reconstructing their fort at Kupang in 1746. During this period, Dutch control of Timor and surrounding areas was largely limited to their Kupang fort and surroundings. In early 1749, the ruler of Sombai (which was returned to Portuguese influence prior) reallied themselves with the Dutch and settled with their followers near Kupang, causing Gaspar da Costa, leader of the Topasses, to gather an army from both the Topass and the local polities aligned to Portugal.

On 18 October 1749, the ruler of Amabi informed the Dutch of a large army assembling. Da Costa wanted to force Sombai to swear fealty to him, with the aid of Portuguese-aligned rulers in the area in addition to men from Larantuka. The Amarassi raja, one of the rulers aligned with da Costa, sent an envoy to attempt to convince the Kupang raja and the Dutch to remain neutral in the conflict.

== Forces ==
Dutch accounts estimated "tens of thousands" of enemy forces, ranging from 20,000 to 50,000, although this figure was likely an exaggeration as Timor's population then was far below half a million. Some of the men were from native leaders who had been forced to join the army, and several leaders had been killed by da Costa as he suspected them of defecting to the Dutch. According to oral traditions, the army was assembled at Nunuhenu, in Ambeno, before it marched towards Kupang. Da Costa was not supported by the Portuguese authorities, and also did not hold full control over the Topass – with the competing de Hornay family not participating in the battle.

Aside from allies, which did not participate in the initial fighting, there were around 500 Dutch soldiers – a sergeant and two corporals, 20 Europeans, 130 Mardijkers, 240 from Sabu, 60 from Solor, and 30 from Rote, in addition to volunteers from the company. All were provided firearms. In addition, there were additional soldiers who were garrisoned in Kupang's fortress and town. The Dutch force was commanded by Ensign Christoffel Lipp, while the Mardijkers were commanded by Frans Mone Kana. Prior to the battle, large parts of Kupang's population fled the town, fearing the approaching army, with Dutch accounts noting the local VOC commander needing to convince their native allies into fighting. The men from Rote and Sabu were also initially demoralized, with VOC having to give promises and sinking the ships before they could be used to flee.

== Battle ==
Da Costa's army camped at Penfui, a hillside to the east of Kupang, and constructed stone and earthen forts there. On Sunday morning of 9 November 1749, the Dutch forces departed Kupang to engage the encampment. Upon encountering the incoming Dutch forces, the Amarasi, who was assigned to the frontmost fortification, sent the Dutch an envoy saying that they "could from now on be called friends of the Dutch" and the Amarasi abandoned the battlefield, without pursuit from the Dutch. As the Dutch moved on to other fortifications, the other Timorese forces who had been forced into the army followed suit and left the battlefield. After the battle, many of the polities under da Costa would realign with the Dutch.

Fighting occurred as the Dutch attempted to take the fortifications one at a time, and as the tide of the battle turned in favor of the Dutch, their Timorese allies joined the fighting. Eventually, with the Topasses trapped in the final fortification, da Costa attempted to flee the battlefield, but was struck down from his horse by an assegai before he went far, and was beheaded. Others who attempted to escape the battle were also pursued and killed, with around 2,000 dead, including many Topass officers and three native rajas. Dutch casualties were minimal, with 19 Timorese, a Mardijker, and two volunteers killed outside of the injuries.

In the immediate aftermath of the battle, the Timorese beheaded the dead bodies, with a letter to the VOC Governor-General in Batavia from the Dutch's Timorese allies reporting over a thousand heads taken. Topass regalia, of spiritual meaning to them, were also seized. When informed of the outcome of the battle, the Portuguese Governor of Timor Manuel Correia de Lacerda remarked that da Costa deserved his fate, with da Costa having ignored his attempts to stop him from launching the campaign.

Swedish historian Hans Hägerdal remarked that though the large army was a "feat" from da Costa, the Timorese were not used to lengthy military campaigns and that the ensuing defeat of da Costa was "logical".

== Aftermath ==
The defeat resulted in the decline of the Topass influence in Timor, and weakened Portuguese power on the island. In the following twelve years, local polities in Timor shifted their allegiances from the Portuguese to the Dutch. In 1769, Portuguese authorities on the island later shifted their headquarters from Lifau in the west to Dili in the east, due to both the Dutch and the Topasses. Dutch historian Herman Gerrit Schulte Nordholt remarked that though impressions of the battle as a turning point in Timorese history are an "exaggeration", the balance of power in the island shifted dramatically after the battle, and had da Costa achieved victory, Timor and the Solor archipelago might have remained Portuguese. In later local tradition, the VOC's victory was attributed to divine intervention, including by the Topasses themselves.

Ensign Lipp, who commanded the Dutch forces, later fell out with the opperhoofd of Kupang and records of his contribution was suppressed. Similarly, the Mardijkers were also not credited due to their potential danger for VOC. Due to the Dutch victory, the Protestant church maintained its presence on Timor, though there were no immediate attempts to enforce the religion to the locals. Around 50,000 inhabitants of Timor became VOC subjects, and in the 1750s multiple Catholic rulers converted to the Dutch Reformed Church.

Throughout the 1750s, the Dutch commander at Kupang launched campaigns against the Topasses in order to further weaken their presence, taking several Topass forts, but eventually failed multiple times to seize their stronghold at Noemuti, partly due to Makassarese merchants supplying the Topass with gunpowder, in addition to logistical and alliance issues. Due to this, Dutch attempts to take part in Timorese affairs toned down until the mid-nineteenth century. The eventual Dutch-Portuguese boundary, not formalized until the nineteenth century, that ensued due to the stalemate continued into the twentieth century until the Indonesian invasion of East Timor. The area where the battle occurred is now the site of the El Tari International Airport.

== See also ==
- Treaty of Lisbon (1859)
