= Wehali =

Traditional kingdom on south-central Timor

Wehali (Wehale, Waihali, Veale) is the name of a traditional kingdom at the southern coast of Central Timor, now in Indonesia and East Timor. It is often mentioned together with its neighbouring sister kingdom, as Wewiku-Wehali (Malaka). Wehali held a position of ritual seniority among the many small Timorese kingdoms.

== Geography and society ==
Wehali is centred at the village of Laran, (now modern-day Wehali, Indonesia), situated on a fertile plain which is well suited for varied agriculture. It belongs to the South Tetun-speaking area, which is also known as Belu. The southern Tetun have a matrilineal system. At the apex of the political system stood a "great lord" (Nai Bot) who held the title of Maromak Oan ("son of God"). His task was ritually passive, in a symbolic sense "female", and he kept an executive "male" regent or assistant by his side, the Liurai ("surpassing the land").

== History ==
According to oral tradition Wehali was the first land that appeared from the waters which once covered the earth, which made it the centre or origin of the world from a Timorese perspective. Other traditions mention a migration from Sina Mutin Malaka (Chinese White Malacca) in ancient times. The historical background of this is not clear, but the account of Antonio Pigafetta of the Magellan expedition, who visited Timor in 1522, confirms the importance of the Wewiku-Wehali kingdom. In the 17th century the ruler of Wehali was described as "an emperor, whom all the kings on the island adhere to with tribute, as being their sovereign". He entertained friendly contacts with the Muslim kingdom of Makassar, but his power was checked by devastating invasions by the Portuguese in 1642 and 1665. Wehali was now brought inside the Portuguese sphere of power but appears to have had limited contact with its colonial suzerain.

=== Dutch East India Company ===
The Portuguese grip over western Timor receded greatly after the 1749 Battle of Penfui, and the Dutch East India Company (Vereenigde Oost-Indische Compagnie or VOC), which had hitherto been confined to Kupang, expanded its sphere of power over large parts of the island. During the 1750s Wehali approached the VOC, and in 1756 the Liurai Jacinto Correia signed a contract with the Dutch diplomat Johannes Andreas Paravicini. According to this contract the Liurai was the overlord over a large number of Timorese kingdoms, including Dirma, Laclo, Luca, Viqueque, Corara and Banibani. The Dutch hoped that the contract would automatically include most of East Timor in their sphere of power, but the ritual rather than executive authority of Wehali was insufficient for this. In effect, Wehali vacillated between the Dutch and Portuguese sides for the next century.

=== Partition and later colonial rule ===
A colonial borderline on Timor was finally agreed on in 1859, which left Wehali's ruling center on the Dutch side. A Dutch official was posted in Atapupu on the north coast of Belu in 1862, but the south coast was not surveyed by the colonial authorities before 1898. Brief military clashes took place in 1900 and 1906. The Dutch proceeded to restructure the administrative divisions of Belu in 1915–1916, trying to use traditional rulers as zelfbestuurders (rajas under colonial surveillance). The Maromak Oan, Baria Nahak, died in 1925, and the Dutch unsuccessfully tried to use his nephew Seran Nahak as Raja of Belu in 1925–1930. After the achievement of independence for Indonesia in 1949, the traditional forms of governance were phased out, but the traditional elite groups still retain an amount of local importance.
