= Topasses =

Group of people in Timor

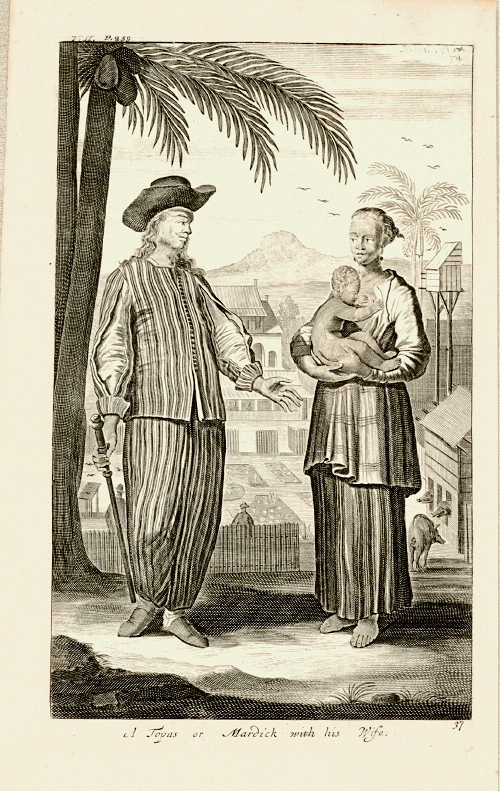
A Topas or Mardick with his wife (J. Nieuhof, 17th century)

Topasses (Tupasses, Topas, Topaz) were a group of people led by the two powerful families – Da Costa and Hornay – that resided in Oecussi and Flores. The Da Costa families were descendants of Portuguese Jewish merchants. The Hornay were Dutch.

== The origins ==
The etymology of the name is obscure. It might come from the Tamil term tuppasi, "bilingual" or "interpreter". It has also been associated with the Hindi word topi (hat) which refers to the characteristic hat worn by the men of this community as a marker of their cultural attachment to the European community.

Hence, they are also referred to as gente de chapeo in Portuguese accounts, or as gens à chapeau in French accounts. It partly overlapped with the Dutch concept mardijker, "free men", who also usually had a Portuguese cultural background, but had no European ancestry.

The mardijkers served under the Dutch colonial authorities. The topasses of Timor were staunchly opposed to the Dutch and used the symbol of the king of Portugal as their ultimate authority.

== Influence on the Timor region ==
As a political entity in the eastern part of Insular Southeast Asia, from the 1560s they arose with the Portuguese settlement on the small Island of Solor, using Solor as a stepping-stone to the trade in sandalwood on Timor. When the Dutch East India Company conquered Solor in 1613, the Portuguese community moved to Larantuka on Flores.

Despite continuous hostilities with the Dutch, the topasses managed to obtain a steady foothold on Timor after 1641. In the late 1650s, part of the population of Larantuka moved over to West Timor, as a response to the establishment of the VOC in Kupang in 1653. They were able to defeat Dutch military expeditions on Timor with the help of Timorese allies, in 1653, 1655, 1656, and 1657.

The peace treaty between the Kingdom of Portugal and the Dutch Republic in 1663 removed the acute threat from the latter. By this time the Topasses consisted of an ethnic mix of Portuguese, Florenese, Timorese, Indians, Dutch deserters, etc. Through their military skills, they were able to dominate large parts of Timor, with their center in Lifau in the present-day Oecussi-Ambeno enclave.

== Independent position within the colonial system ==
The Topass community was led by their own appointed captains and had little contact with the viceroy of Portuguese India. They pressed Timorese princes to deliver sandalwood to the coast, which was sold to merchants from the Portuguese colony of Macau or to the Dutch.

In 1641, their leader Francisco Fernandes led a Portuguese military expedition to weaken the power of the Muslim Makassarese, who had recently made inroads in Timor. His small army of musketeers settled on Timor, extending Portuguese influence into the interior. After 1664, the Topasses were governed by the Hornay and Costa families, who held the titles captain-major (capitão mor) or lieutenant general (tenente general).

In 1656, the Portuguese appointed an administrator to Lifau. In 1702, the Portuguese authorities installed a regular governor in Lifau, a move that was violently opposed by the Topass community. The Topasses had become a law unto themselves and drove out the Portuguese governor António Coelho Guerreiro in 1705. In 1769, after more attacks from the Topasses in Lifau, the Portuguese base was moved east to Dili in eastern Timor. For long periods up to 1785, a state of warfare existed between the two Portuguese groups.

== Decline of the community ==
In 1749, a political crisis involving Topass leader Gaspar da Costa resulted in another war with the Dutch. When he marched on Kupang with a considerable force he was routed and killed at the Battle of Penfui, after which the Dutch expanded their control of western Timor. Many Timorese princedoms which had hitherto been subordinated to Topass authority now fell away and allied with the VOC instead. The Topass still managed to hang on in Oecussi, and killed the Dutch commander Hans Albrecht von Plüskow in 1761, when he attempted to expand the Dutch sphere on Timor.

Their power receded by the late 18th century, due to diminishing economic and political opportunities. Still, neither Portuguese nor Dutch colonial influence could be firmly established on Timor until the 19th century and only with continuous and heavy military force. The concept of Topass disappeared from the records in the 19th century.

Between 1847 and 1913 the Portuguese had to mount more than 60 armed expeditions to subdue the Timorese in the interior of the island; a few of these revolts occurred in the old Topasses part, west of East Timor. Hornay and Da Costa's descendants continued to govern locally as rajas, or liurais, of Oecussi up to modern times.

During the early 1900s, the enclave of OeCussi was ruled by Dom Hugo Da Costa and Rainha Elena Hornay.
