= 2026 in Timor-Leste =

- Decades: 2000s; 2010s; 2020s
- See also: Other events of 2026; History of Timor-Leste; Timeline

Events in the year 2026 in Timor-Leste.

== Incumbents ==
Photo	Post	Name
	President of Timor-Leste	José Ramos-Horta
	Prime Minister of Timor-Leste	Xanana Gusmão

== Events ==
- 13 February – Myanmar expels East Timorese charge d’affaires Elisio do Rosario de Sousa in response to investigations in Timor-Leste against the Burmese military junta for war crimes and crimes against humanity.

== Holidays ==
- 1 January – New Year's Day
- 3 March – Veterans Day
- 20 March – Eid al-Fitr
- 3 April – Good Friday
- 1 May – Labour Day
- 20 May – Independence Restoration Day
- 27 May – Eid al-Adha
- 4 June – Corpus Christi
- 30 August – Popular Consultation Day
- 1 November – All Saints' Day
- 2 November – All Souls' Day
- 3 November – National Women's Day
- 12 November – National Youth Day
- 28 November – Independence Day
- 7 December – Memorial Day
- 8 December – Immaculate Conception
- 25 December – Christmas Day

== Deaths ==
- 21 April – José Honório, 53, minister of higher education, science and culture (since 2023)
- 21 June – Francisco Guterres, 71, president (2017–2022) and president of the national parliament (2002–2007)
