= 2022 in Timor-Leste =

- Decades: 2000s; 2010s; 2020s
- See also: Other events of 2022; History of Timor-Leste; Timeline

Events in the year 2022 in Timor-Leste.

== Incumbents ==
Photo	Post	Name
	President of Timor-Leste	José Ramos-Horta
	Prime Minister of Timor-Leste	Taur Matan Ruak

== Events ==
Ongoing — COVID-19 pandemic in Timor-Leste

- March 19 – 2022 East Timorese presidential election: Timorese are called to the polls to choose the country's president.
- March 20 – Preliminary results show that former president José Ramos-Horta is ahead of the incumbent Francisco Guterres in the presidential election.
- April 19 – The East Timorese people vote in the second round of the presidential election between José Ramos-Horta and incumbent Francisco Guterres.
- April 20 – Former president José Ramos-Horta defeats incumbent president Francisco Guterres to become the next President of Timor-Leste.

== Deaths ==
- 3 January – Silvino Adolfo Morais, 65, politician.
