= 2020 in Timor-Leste =

- Decades: 2000s; 2010s; 2020s
- See also: Other events of 2020; History of Timor-Leste; Timeline

Events in the year 2020 in Timor-Leste.

== Incumbents ==
Photo	Post	Name
	President of Timor-Leste	Francisco Guterres
	Prime Minister of Timor-Leste	Taur Matan Ruak

== Events ==
Ongoing — COVID-19 pandemic in Timor-Leste

- 21 March – The first case of COVID-19 is confirmed in Timor-Leste, a state of emergency is declared.
- 6 April – The first COVID-19 linked death is reported, a 44-year-old woman.
- 30 November – The state of emergency ends, the requirement to wear face masks outdoors is lifted.

== Sports ==
- The 2020 Liga Futebol Amadora Terceira Divisão was cancelled due to the COVID-19 pandemic.
- 13 November – 12 December: 2020 Taça 12 de Novembro.
