= Kemak =

Kemak may refer to:

- Kemak people
- Kemak language
