= 2021 in Timor-Leste =

- Decades: 2000s; 2010s; 2020s
- See also: Other events of 2021; History of Timor-Leste; Timeline

Events in the year 2021 in Timor-Leste.

== Incumbents ==
- President: Francisco Guterres
- Prime Minister: Taur Matan Ruak

== Events ==
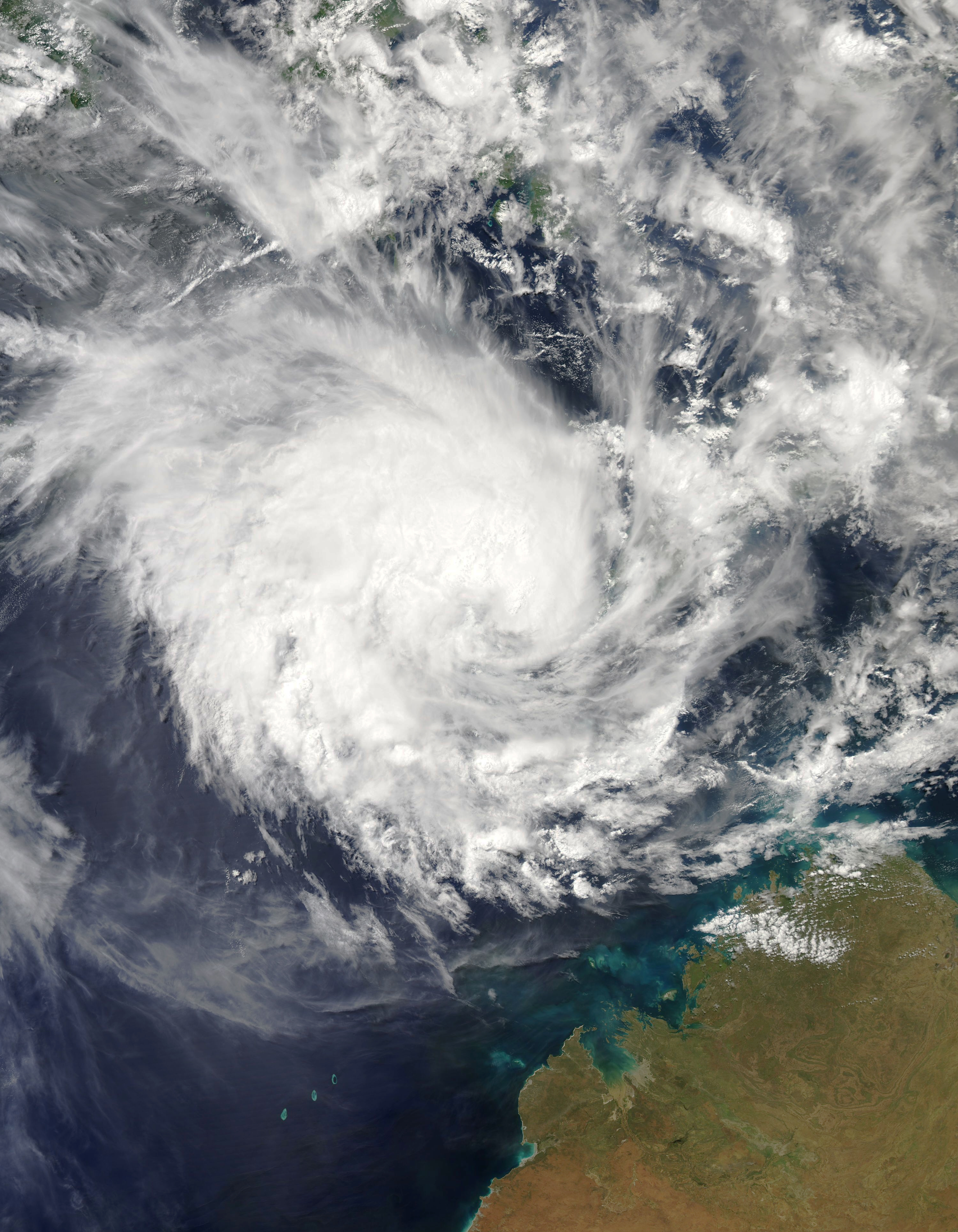
Tropical Cyclone Seroja on 5 April 2021

Ongoing — COVID-19 pandemic in Timor-Leste

- April – Cyclone Seroja makes landfall in Indonesia and Timor-Leste. As of 5 April 2021, it was estimated that at least 27 people in Timor-Leste had died in landslides and flash floods as a result of the storm, most of them in Dili.
- December – 2021 Timor Leste earthquake
