= 2002 in Timor-Leste =

- Decades: 2000s; 2010s; 2020s
- See also: Other events of 2002; History of Timor-Leste; Timeline

The following lists events that happened during 2002 in Timor-Leste (formerly known as East Timor).

== Incumbents ==
- President: Xanana Gusmão (starting 20 May)
- Prime Minister: Mari Alkatiri (starting 20 May)

== Events ==
=== May ===
- May 20 - Timor-Leste restores its Republic as proclaimed back in 1975, thus confirming its independence from Portugal in 2002.
