= 2024 in Timor-Leste =

- Decades: 2000s; 2010s; 2020s
- See also: Other events of 2024; History of Timor-Leste; Timeline

Events in the year 2024 in Timor-Leste.

== Incumbents ==
Photo	Post	Name
	President of Timor-Leste	José Ramos-Horta
	Prime Minister of Timor-Leste	Xanana Gusmão

== Events ==
=== January ===
- 9 January - President José Ramos-Horta makes the first-ever visit by an East Timorese president to India, attending the 10th biennial Vibrant Gujarat summit with Foreign Minister Bendito Freitas.

=== March ===
- 21 March - Arnolfo Teves Jr., a Filipino congressman who sought asylum in Timor-Leste after being wanted in his home country on suspicion of involvement in the assassination of a political rival in 2023, is arrested in Dili.

=== April ===
- Parliament approves a legal amendment allowing it to appoint or dismiss the head of the Anti-Corruption Commission with a simple majority, rather than requiring three-quarters of legislators; the opposition criticize the change as weakening the rule of law.
- The Government extends the temporary ban on all martial arts groups by six months, citing violence linked to some groups.

=== August ===
- 9 August - Indian President Droupadi Murmu makes the first-ever visit by an Indian head of state to Timor-Leste, as part of a tour of Pacific region countries.
- 14-16 August - The Sci-Tech EXPO 2024 takes place in Dili.

=== September ===
- A journalist covering evictions of street vendors in Dili is briefly detained, and another journalist’s camera is seized.
- 9-11 September - Pope Francis makes a visit to Timor-Leste, becoming the first pope to do so since 1989 and the first since the country gained independence in 2002.

=== October ===
- 16-19 October - The Rabilau Festival is held on Mount Rabilau, Maubisse, Ainaro.

== Holidays ==
- 1 January - New Year's Day
- 3 March - Veterans Day
- 29 March - Good Friday
- 10 April – Eid al-Fitr
- 1 May - Labour Day
- 20 May - Independence Restoration Day
- 30 May - Corpus Christi
- 16 June – Eid al-Adha
- 30 August - Popular Consultation Day
- 1 November - All Saints' Day
- 2 November - All Souls' Day
- 3 November - National Women's Day
- 12 November - National Youth Day
- 28 November - Proclamation of Independence Day
- 8 December – Immaculate Conception
- 25 December - Christmas Day
