= Kemak people =

Kemak people Quémaque / Ema
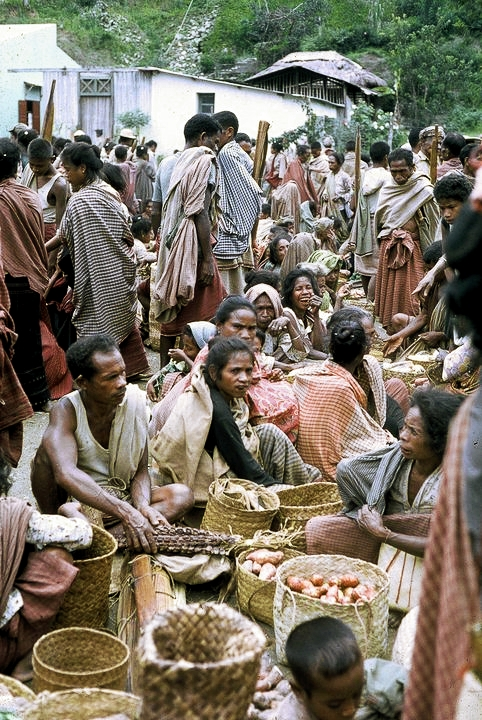
- Kemak people at the market in Atsabe, East Timor, circa 1968–1970.

Total population
- 71,000

Regions with significant populations
- Timor
- East Timor: 61,969 (2010)
- Indonesia (West Timor): 10,800

Languages
- Kemak, Indonesian, Kupang Malay, Tetum, Portuguese

Religion
- Christianity (94% in Timor-Leste, 90% in Indonesia), Folk religion (6% in Timor-Leste, 10% in Indonesia)

Related ethnic groups
- Mambai people (Timor), Tokodede people, Tetum people, Austronesians, Melanesians

The Kemak (Portuguese: Quémaque, also known as Ema) people are an ethnic group numbering 80,000 in north-central Timor island. Most live in the district of Bobonaro, East Timor, and the rest live in the East Nusa Tenggara province of Indonesia.

They are close to the Tetum people. The Kemak people speak the Kemak language. They are one of the smallest of the 14 Austronesian subgroups in Timor. Most of them are adherents of traditional beliefs, while part of them profess the Catholic faith. Territorial community is headed by a leader, divided into genera. There are three levels of conjunctions. The "private" type of group corresponds to the level of uma or house. It does not only mean housing, but its category includes the exogamous groups of older and younger brothers who share a common ancestor. The "collective" type refers to the Morobe community, which encompasses 7 villages containing mainly 3 houses, and united by a common ritual cycle.

== Settlement area ==
For the most part, the Kemak people live in Atabae, Cailaco, Maliana (Bobonaro District, 39,000 Kemaks) and Atsabe (Ermera District, 18,500 Kemaks), but also partly in the Cova Lima District (2,100 Kemaks) of East Timor and in Belu Regency, East Nusa Tenggara of Indonesia. According to the 2010 East Timor census, 61,969 people identify Kemak language as their mother tongue. In 1970, there were 45,084 people.

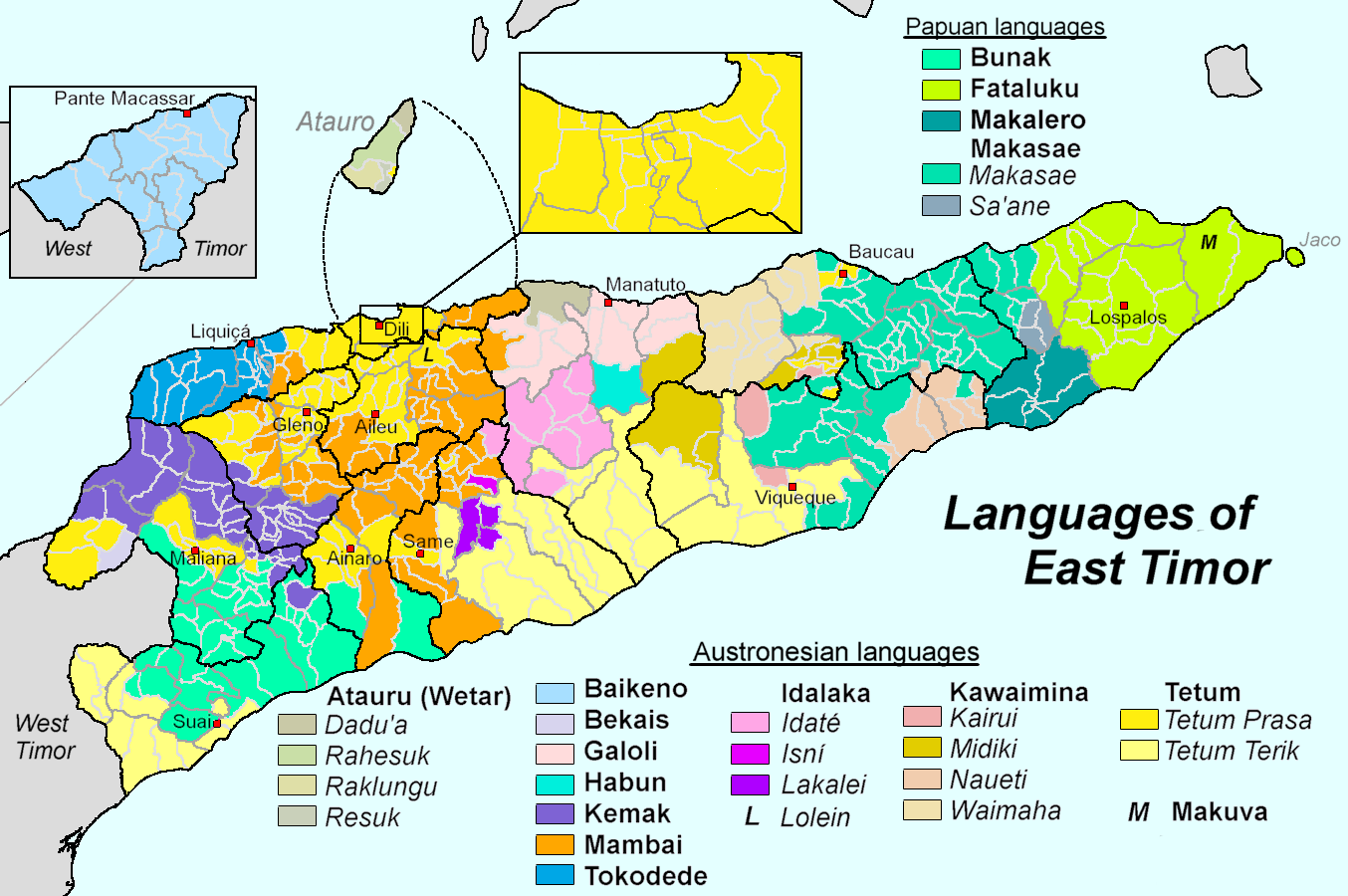
Major language groups in East Timor, according to the October 2010 census.

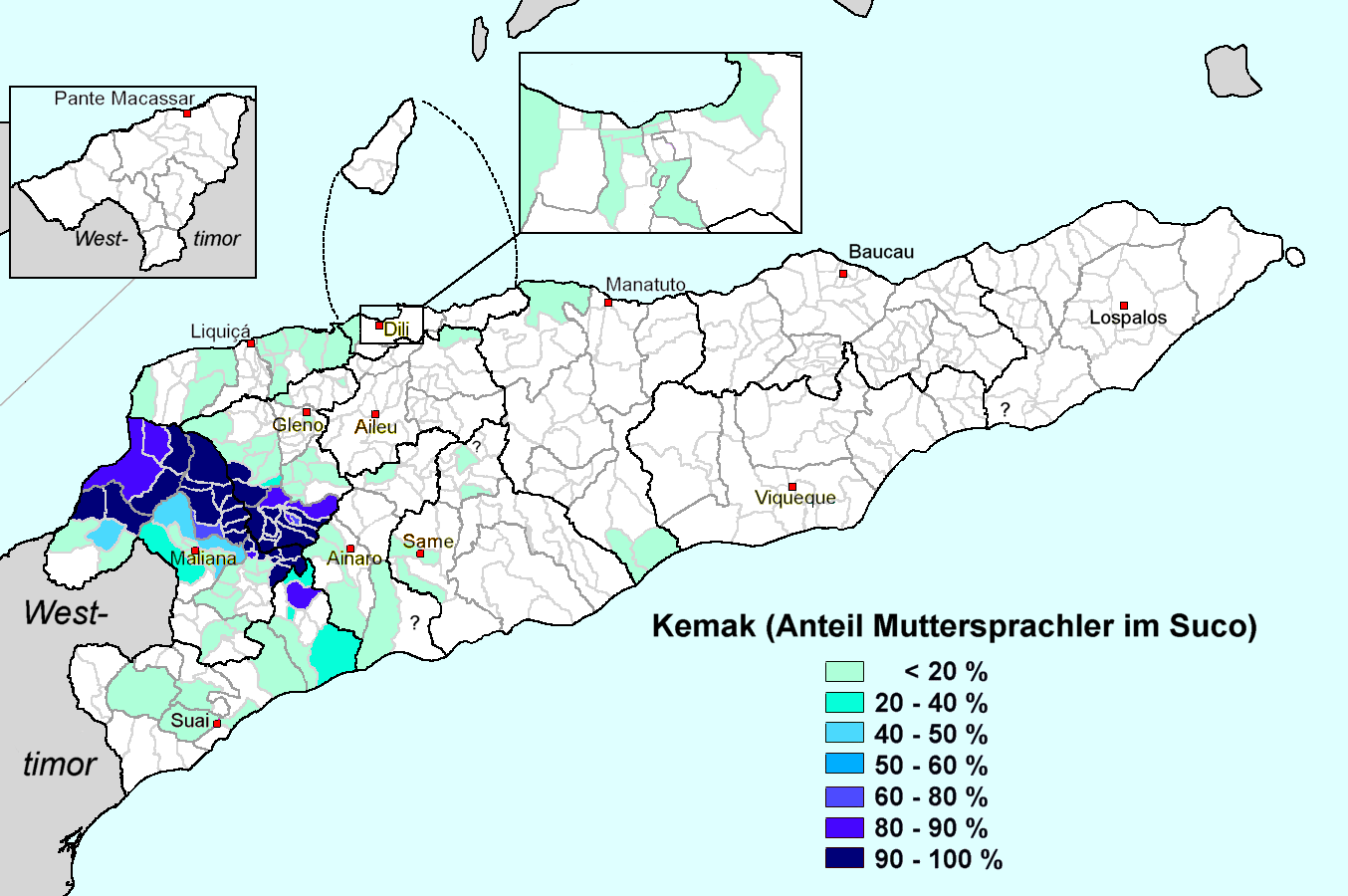
Percentage of people using Kemak language as mother tongue in Sucos of East Timor (Timor-Leste), according to the 2010 census.

== History ==
=== Kemak people of Atsabe ===
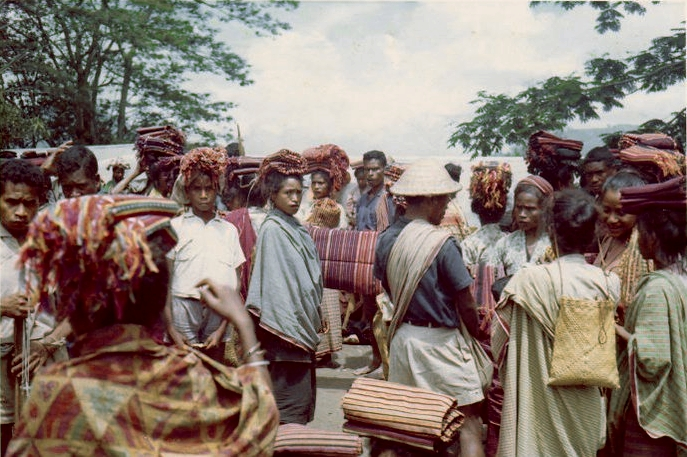
A typical traditional clothing called "tais" as seen in a market in Atsabe, circa 1968–1970.

Before the colonial period, Atsabe was one of the centers of Timor under the koronel bote (meaning "Kings") of Atsabe Kemak, which dominated the entire Kemak inhabited areas in East Timor until the colonial period. The Kemak areas includes the north of present-day Bobonaro, in the northern Ainaro, and in the area of Suai that were tributary to Atsabe. The small Kemak empire of Marobo had a peripheral location, which is why the Kemak people there were mixed with the neighboring Bunak people for generations. Atsabe was part of a complex alliance system through rituals, marriage and trade, though which the Tetun Dili people of Wehali with its capital, Laran were established. Laran was at the same time the spiritual center of the entire island. In addition to Tetum Dili and Kemak people, the Bunak people and Mambai people of Aileu were also part of this alliance system. Together with the east of the island, the Portuguese called this area Belu (also Belos or Fialaran).

According to the oral traditions of the Atsabe Kemaks people, they came relatively late under the colonial Portuguese rule. One reason could have been the far-reaching dispersal of the inhabitants and the impassibility of the mountainous landscape. Only in the 19th century did the Portuguese-Angolan troops had first invaded the area. The then Kings Dom Tomás Pinto opposed the invaders. But Dom Tomás was defeated and had to go to Atambua to flee to West Timor. Portuguese sources mentioned the region of Atsabe and Liurai only in the middle of the 19th century. The Atsabe rulers were particularly prone to rebel against the colonial leaders and their presence in the island. Two of Dom Tomás' grandchildren, Nai Resi and Nai Sama later fought for power. While Nai Resi turned against the Portuguese colonialists, Nai Sama supported the Portuguese. Nai Sama was finally executed by his own men, while Nai Resi was captured by the Portuguese in Hatulia and executed as well.

The Portuguese were first regarded as another people with their own ruler. After the resistance to them had failed, the Kemak people accepted the leaders of the Portuguese as part of their higher hierarchy that provided them with a larger army, holy men, the Catholic priests and with a larger Lulic (ritual practitioner). The flag of the Portuguese and even its flagpole were viewed as sacred objects. The colonial rulers, confirmed as administrators of Portugal, were again legitimized by handing over of the flag.

The acceptance of Kemak people for the established Catholicism was closely related to their understanding of the personified holiness. This imported concept of holiness is seen as a stronger expansion of the local's existing traditional Luli. The Catholic priests were given land to build chapels and were allowed to do mission work. But the success of conversion was not much because of the friendless but rather so that one's own spiritual powers can be increased.

Nai Resi's son, Dom Cipriano Gonçalves (Dom Siprianu) became the ruler of Atsabe in 1912 until 1943. During the Japanese occupation of Timor, he and the population of Atsabe made passive resistance. Therefore, Siprianu along with six of his relatives were taken hostage by the Japanese and later executed.

Since the Portuguese education system was reserved for the ruling class, they were also able to secure the leading positions in the colonial administration. The same was true later during the Indonesian occupation, the boundaries of collaboration and apparent cooperation for the protection of its own people were obvious. The East Timorese resistance also found partial support here.

The son of Siprianu and the last ruler of Atsabe, Dom Guilherme Maria Gonçalves became a co-founder of the pro-Indonesian party, Timorese Popular Democratic Association (APODETI) in 1974, which called for the support of East Timor to Indonesia. During the Indonesian occupation, Dom Guilherme was the Governor of Indonesian Timor Timur from 1978 to 1982. Later, he distanced himself from Indonesia and went into Portuguese exile. After the East Timorese people had spoken in a 1999 referendum for an independence from Indonesia, pro-Indonesian militias attacked family members and allies of the former koronel bote (meaning "rulers"). The reason was due to the suspect that the former ruler supported the independence movement.

=== Other Kemak communities ===
In the spring of 1867, the Kemak people from Lermean (today the municipality of Ermera District) under the supremacy of Maubara rose up against the Portuguese colonial masters. Governor Francisco Teixeira da Silva defeated the opposition in an unequal fight. In the decisive battle, which lasted for 48 hours, the rebels had to defend themselves against a superior fire power. Fifteen villages were taken and burnt down. The number of victims among the Timorese is not known, while the Portuguese counted their own losses with two dead and eight wounded. The territory of Lermeans was divided into the neighboring kingdoms.

In 1868, the Portuguese sent a military force to Suco Sanirin (Sanir / Saniry) whose liurai (ruler) refused to pay taxes, and a fort in Suco Batugade was made to serve as a center for military operations. The Kemak people of Suco Sanirin were officially Balibo Subdistrict tributary under Batugade military command.

Between 1894 and 1897, several empires rebelled in the west of the Portuguese colony. In the Portuguese punitive action, several Kemak empires such as Sanirin, Cotubaba and Deribate were practically wiped out. Thousands of residents fled to West Timor of the Dutch East Indies and settled there in Belu. More followed in the years between 1900 and 1912. Investigations assume at least 12,000 refugees.

== Religion and social structure ==
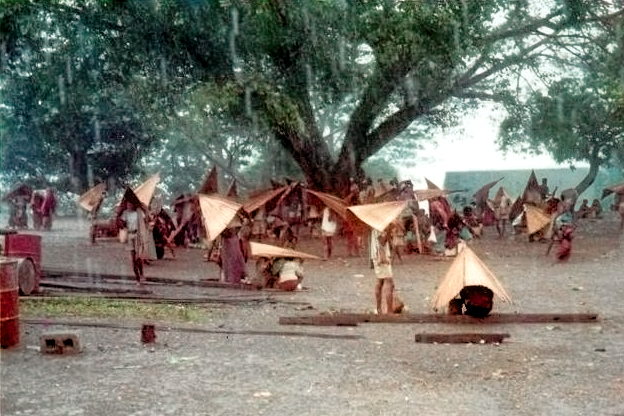
Traditional umbrellas (saluric in Tetum language) used in Atsabe, circa 1968-1970.

Like the other ethnic groups of East Timor, the Kemak people today are largely adherents of the Catholic faith. Thus, in the Atsabe Administrative Post almost all inhabitants are Catholics. It spread particularly during the Indonesian occupation of East Timor (1975–1999) as a demarcation to the majority Muslim invaders. Prior to the invasion, most people were animists. The church offered protection, criticized the brutal behavior of the occupiers, and was a means of peaceful protest. The veneration of the Virgin Mary, especially in small towns, is particularly marked by numerous religious ceremonies in churches and grottoes.

Nevertheless, the Christian rites still bear traces of the animistic, traditional religion. Components of the ancient religion are ancestral cult, reliquary worship and the concept of sacred (Kemak language: luli, Tetum language: lulik) places. One of them is Mount Dar Lau, which is the mythical place of origin of the Atsabe Kemak people. According to legend, heaven and earth were once connected at this point. Christian priests that kept animistic practices, are revered as holy men with spiritual powers (Luli). Such spiritual powers are passed on through a blessing. In doing so, these spiritual forces are not only derived from the office, but rather men who are credited with spiritual forces to join the priesthood.

There are slight variations in the ceremonies between the different groups of Kemak communities, such as the Atsabe Kemak and the Marobo Kemak people.

Society is characterized by a hierarchical division according to the families, the "houses". The house of the Koronel (Tetum language: Liurai), the traditional kingship, had their authority derived from their origins in their founding fathers and their luli. The latter could either be both in a person himself as well as in sacred objects. The same applies to the traditional priests (gases ubu), who claimed their position on the basis of their origin and ritual knowledge. They were the guardians of sacred history and traditions. Only the king surpasses them in holiness. He also retains the largest share of holy objects, which were handed down from their founding fathers. But the authority of the priests is limited to the rituals. However, it was possible that a person have both secular power, for example, as a village chief, and at the same time a priest. The king of Atsabe had both authorities. In addition, the king's house secured his position of power though strategical marriage policy, the exchange of women and material goods, and the formation of an army to fight in regional feuds and head hunting.

The sacred houses are built together by all men who belong to a tribe line. They meet on a weekend, once a month, for eleven months. At the end of the monthly work is always a small ritual feast celebrated. The sacred houses consist of seven levels, each with four steps. Restriction to the access depends on the degree of kinship. Simple guests are allowed only in the lowest level of the house, friends at least in the second level, married relatives in the third, relatives from neighbouring villages in the fourth and partly in the fifth, those married in the village in the sixth and only the Lulik Nain (meaning "Lord of the Holy") up to the seventh level. He is the guardian of the house and the sacred objects, which are kept here. At the inauguration of the house, a buffalo is sacrificed and a great feast is celebrated.

=== Funeral ceremonies ===
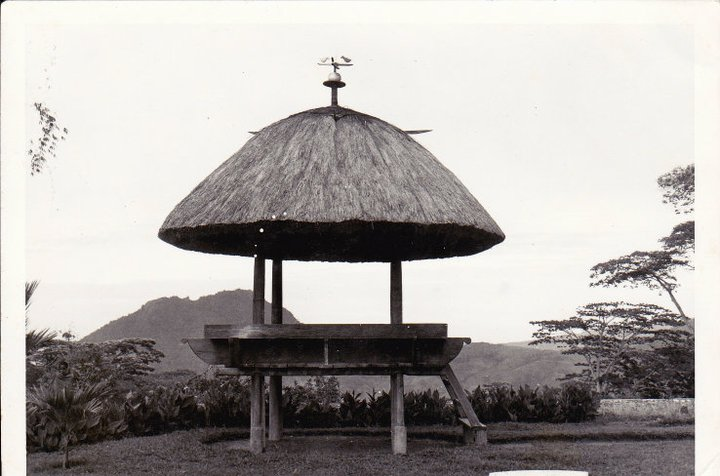
A traditional house called laco, for meeting the families that are part of a Lulic (sacred) house and also to receive guests, circa 1968–1970.

The burial ceremonies of the Kemak people (Tau tana mate) are divided into three phases, namely Huku bou, Leko-cicir lia and Koli nughu. The burial ceremonies are referred to as black rituals (Metama no). It is one of the occasions when the living ones come into contact with their ancestors, which also leads to the renewal and restructuring of the social connections between the living and the dead as well as between the alliance partners, whom are connected by marriage. The house of the "bride-donors" (ai mea) and those of the "bride-receptors" play central roles in the burial ceremonies, as in other major events. Before all members of the family have arrived, the ritual cannot be started. The blood of the sacrificial animals that the Ai mea have donated is used to brush ritual objects and the grave. In times of polygamy, the attendance of second wives and their participation (Bei-bei) is an absolute requirement. In addition, there are also the attendance of the entire sides of the family, such as those of the older and younger houses (ka'ara-aliri), which are connected by marriage and the friendly and allied ones.

For the Atsabe Kemak people the first phase of burial, the Huku bou, consists of sacrifice of at least five water buffaloes and several goats and pigs. The dead person is then buried in a Christian grave. The second phase, Leko-cicir lia, is the most cost-intensive ritual of the Kemak culture. This is usually performed jointly for several deceased. Only a high status dead person, such as a Koronel, receive an independent ritual. The ritual is usually performed before the beginning of the planting season (August to September), since it is combined with the request to the ancestors for a rich harvest. According to traditional belief, the second rite have not been performed yet for the soul of the deceased and it is said to remain near his house and village (Asi naba coa pu). The later the leko-cicir lia takes place, the more shall the lonely soul long for his society, and therefore will call for the souls of the living to him. An accumulation of deaths within a house is regarded as a sign of such a case. Nevertheless, the ritual is usually carried out only years after the first phase, since the house of the dead must first afford the economic means for such expensive ritual. It is particularly complicated by the concept of the Second Burial. The bones of the deceased are excavated, cleaned and re-buried, while the soul of the dead are guided through ritual songs (Nele) of the priest to the village of the ancestors on the Tatamailau, East Timor's highest mountain. The songs can take up to 14 hours. During the ritual, water buffaloes are once again presented as animal sacrifices. The severed sexual organs of all sacrificial animals are brought deep into the sacred jungle (Ai lara hui) at the end of the ceremony and placed there before Bia Mata Ai Pun (the origin of spring and trees). The ancestors are conjured up by a song, through the sacrifices of animals, to transfer the souls of the dead to the ancestors. At the end the bones of the dead are again buried. The conclusion is now a Christian Mass, the only reference to the new faith.
