= 2008 in Timor-Leste =

- Decades: 2000s; 2010s; 2020s
- See also: Other events of 2008; History of Timor-Leste; Timeline

The following lists events that happened during 2008 in Timor-Leste.

== Incumbents ==
- President: José Ramos-Horta
- Prime Minister: Xanana Gusmão

== Events ==
=== January ===
- January 17 - President José Ramos-Horta urges Timorese to forgive and pray for former Indonesian president Suharto, who ordered the invasion of East Timor in 1975.
- January 25 - Monsoon storms have caused serious damage to homes and crops across Timor-Leste, relief authorities say.
- January 30 - A 6.6-magnitude earthquake shakes Maluku, Indonesia, and triggers a tsunami alert, which is later lifted. The epicenter was on the sea bed about 160 miles northeast of Dili.

=== February ===
- February 4 - The United Nations has transferred authority to East Timorese police at three posts in Dili.
- February 11 - East Timorese President José Ramos-Horta is shot and seriously wounded in an attack at his home. Rebel leader Alfredo Reinhado, who led the attack, is killed. Gunman also attack a motorcade of Prime Minister Xanana Gusmão, but there are no injuries.
