= 2025 in Timor-Leste =

- Decades: 2000s; 2010s; 2020s
- See also: Other events of 2025; History of Timor-Leste; Timeline

The following events occurred in Timor-Leste in the year 2025.

== Incumbents ==
Photo	Post	Name
	President of Timor-Leste	José Ramos-Horta
	Prime Minister of Timor-Leste	Xanana Gusmão

== Holidays ==
- 1 January – New Year's Day
- 3 March – Veterans Day
- 30 March – Eid al-Fitr
- 18 April – Good Friday
- 1 May – Labour Day
- 20 May – Independence Restoration Day
- 6 June – Eid al-Adha
- 19 June – Corpus Christi
- 30 August – Popular Consultation Day
- 1 November – All Saints' Day
- 2 November – All Souls' Day
- 3 November – National Women's Day
- 12 November – National Youth Day
- 28 November – Proclamation of Independence Day
- 8 December – Immaculate Conception
- 25 December – Christmas Day

== Events ==
- 16 April – Timor-Leste launches its first offshore gaming license.
- 29 May – Arnolfo Teves Jr., a Filipino congressman who had been seeking sanctuary in Timor-Leste after being wanted in his home country for the Pamplona massacre in 2023, is deported and repatriated on national security grounds and concerns over Dili's accession to ASEAN.
- 2 July – Myanmar officially notifies Malaysia, the 2025 ASEAN chair, of its opposition to Timor-Leste joining the bloc in October 2025, amid Timor-Leste reportedly supporting anti-junta forces in the Myanmar civil war.
- 15 September – Protests break out nationwide due to proposals to purchase cars for MPs, prompting the government to withdraw the proposal the next day.
- 26 October – Timor-Leste formally joins ASEAN.
- 9—20 December — Timor-Leste at the 2025 SEA Games
