= Luís Cardoso =

Contemporary East Timorese writer

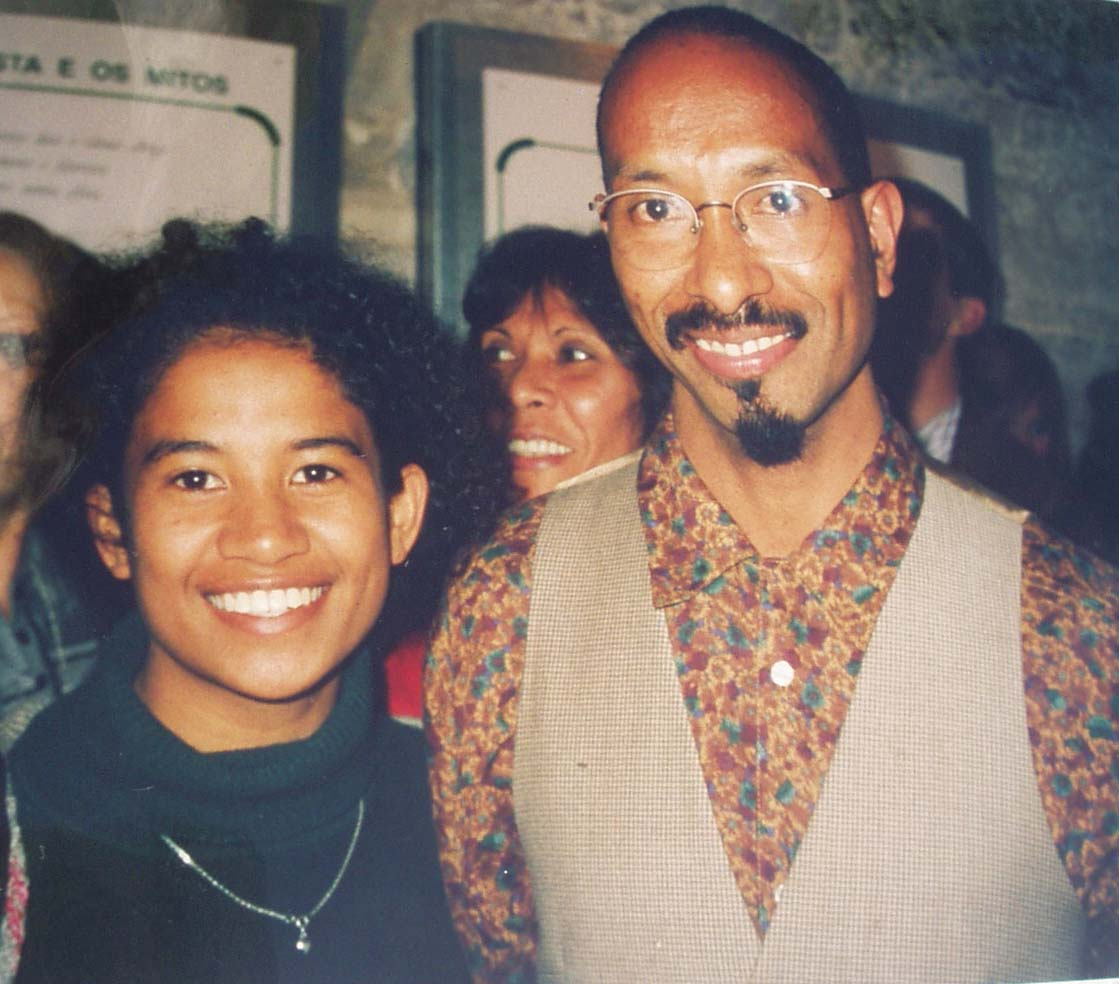
- Cardoso (right) in Lisbon in 1992
- Born: Luís Cardoso de Noronha; 8 December 1958 (age 67); Cailaco, Bobonaro, Portuguese Timor (now East Timor)
- Education: Graduate in Silviculture
- Alma mater: Instituto Superior de Agronomia, University of Lisbon
- Occupations: Writer; Professor of Tetum and Portuguese Language
- Writing career
- Language: Portuguese
- Notable awards: Prêmio Oceanos; 2021 O Plantador de Abóboras

Luís Cardoso de Noronha (born 8 December 1958) is a contemporary East Timorese writer. His work focuses on the history of his homeland. It is written in Portuguese, and has been translated into other languages including French and English. In 2021, he won the Prêmio Oceanos for his novel The Pumpkin Planter (Sonata for a Fog) (O Plantador de Abóboras (Sonata para uma Neblina) (2020)).

== Early life and education ==
Cardoso was born in Cailaco, Bobonaro, an inland town in the then Portuguese Timor. As the son of a paramedic who worked in several locations in East Timor, he came to know, and speaks, several Timorese languages. He attended the missionary colleges of Soibada in Manatuto and Fuiloro in Lautém, the Seminary of Our Lady of Fatima in Dare, Dili, and the Liceu Dr. Francisco Machado in Dili.

After the Carnation Revolution in 1974, Cardoso went to Portugal on a scholarship for further training at the Instituto Superior de Agronomia (ISA), University of Lisbon, from which he obtained a degree in silviculture. One of his fellow students at the ISA was the writer José Eduardo Agualusa. He also qualified in law, environmental politics and mathematics.

== Career ==
Due to the Indonesian invasion of East Timor, Cardoso then remained in Portugal. There, he became involved in the National Council of Maubere Resistance (Portuguese: Conselho Nacional da Resistência Maubere (CNRM)), the umbrella organization of the East Timorese resistance against the Indonesians. He campaigned in Spain, Portugal and Brazil for the CNRM.

Cardoso has also worked as a Timorese storyteller, as a columnist for Fórum Estudante magazine, and as a Professor of Tetum and Portuguese Language.

In his written works, which have been translated into several languages, Cardoso repeatedly takes up the history of East Timor. His first book, The Crossing (2002) (Crónica de uma Travessia (1997)) has the flavour of a colonial Bildungsroman, but is in fact an autobiographical memoir of his early days in Portuguese Timor, and subsequent exile in Lisbon. In Owl Eyes – Cat Eyes (Olhos de Coruja, Olhos de Gato Bravo (2001)), he relates the profound consequences that Portugal's "Carnation Revolution" had for its tiny, isolated colony in Southeast Asia. In The Last Death of Colonel Santiago (A Última Morte do Coronel Santiago (2003)), the narrator, an expatriate East Timorese resident in Portugal, returns to his home country and is confronted with the crimes committed by his ancestors.

In 2015, Cardoso told Portuguese news agency Lusa (translation):

"We can already talk about a Timorese culture, but there is still a lot to do with cultural identity and diversity, which is still under construction. We are taking the first steps in consolidating this cultural identity.

"We're just starting. It's been 40 years, lived partly during the time of resistance, which did not allow people with art and ingenuity to have the availability to write, as many of them were decimated."

Six years later, in 2021, Cardoso won the Prêmio Oceanos for his sixth novel, The Pumpkin Planter (Sonata for a Fog) (O Plantador de Abóboras (Sonata para uma Neblina) (2020)). The pumpkins mentioned in that title, and in the novel, serve as a metaphor for East Timor, which depends heavily upon oil exploitation, but in Cardoso's view ought to return to more sustainable alternatives. In the novel, Cardoso's female narrator takes the reader through three wars involving East Timor: the Manufahi Rebellion of 1911–1912, the Japanese invasion and occupation during World War II, and the Indonesian invasion and subsequent occupation of the former Portuguese colony.

As the first Timorese to win the Prêmio Oceanos, Cardoso was congratulated by President Francisco Guterres and his predecessor José Ramos-Horta. In an interview with the Tatoli news agency, Cardoso dedicated his victory to all the people of East Timor. According to Cardoso, the Timorese have a patriotic duty to record in a book the history of their country and their lives, and the freedom to choose the topic. "Writing is my form of civic intervention as a citizen of my country," he had explained to Lusa in an earlier interview. After winning the award, he added, "We have oral literature, but we don't have written literature in Timor and written literature is starting and I'm kicking off."

== List of works ==
Cardoso's works include:

- The Crossing (Translated by Jull Costa, Margaret.; London: Granta, 2002; ISBN 186207352X)
  (Crónica de uma Travessia - A Época do Ai Dik-Funam (Lisbon, 1997))
- Owl Eyes – Cat Eyes
  (Olhos de Coruja, Olhos de Gato Bravo (Lisbon, 2001))
- The Last Death of Colonel Santiago
  (A Última Morte do Coronel Santiago (Lisbon, 2003))
- Requiem for a Solitary Navigator
  (Requiem para um Navegador solitário (Lisbon, 2007))
- The Year Pigafetta Completed His Circumnavigation
  (O Ano em que Pigafetta completou a Circum-Navegação (Lisbon, 2012))
- Where do Cats Go when They Die? A Biblical Parable
  (Para onde vão os Gatos quando morrem? Uma Parábola Bíblica (Lisbon, 2017)
- The Pumpkin Planter (Sonata for a Fog)
  (O Plantador de Abóboras (Sonata para uma Neblina) (Lisbon, 2020))
