= Silvino =

Silvino is a masculine given name and a surname. Bearers of the name include:

== Given name ==
- Silvino Barsana Agudo (1917–2010), Filipino lawyer and politician, governor of Batanes province
- Silvino Bercellino (born 1946), Italian retired footballer
- Silvino Bracho (born 1992), Venezuelan baseball pitcher in the Mexican League
- Silvino Lopes Évora, Cape Verdean writer, poet, journalist and university professor
- Silvino Francisco (1946–2024), South African snooker player
- Silvino Louro (born 1959), Portuguese retired football goalkeeper
- Silvino Adolfo Morais (1956–2022), East Timorese politician
- Silvino Ruiz (1901–?), Cuban baseball pitcher in the Negro leagues
- Silvino Santos (1886–1970), Portuguese-born cinematographer and photographer who emigrated to Brazil
- Silvino Soares (born 1978), Cape Verdean football striker

== Surname ==
- Anselmo Silvino (born 1945), Italian retired weightlifter
- Paulo Silvino (1939–2017), Brazilian comedian, composer and actor

== See also ==
- Cuevas del Silvino, a limestone cave system in Guatemala
