= 2023 in Timor-Leste =

- Decades: 2000s; 2010s; 2020s
- See also: Other events of 2023; History of Timor-Leste; Timeline

Events in the year 2023 in Timor-Leste.

== Incumbents ==
Photo	Post	Name
	President of Timor-Leste	José Ramos-Horta
	Prime Minister of Timor-Leste	Taur Matan Ruak until 1 July
	Prime Minister of Timor-Leste	Xanana Gusmão assumed office 1 July

== Events ==
- 1 July: 2023 East Timorese parliamentary election: Xanana Gusmão is sworn in as prime minister of Timor-Leste.
