= Battle of Cailaco =

- The siege of the mountain stronghold Cailaco in 1726
Date	23 October – 8 December 1726
Location	Cailaco, Portuguese Timor
Result	Portuguese victory
Territorial changes	Fall of the Timorese stronghold after six weeks

Belligerents
Kingdom of Portugal: Estado da Índia; Allied Timorese kingdoms	15 kingdoms alliance

Commanders and leaders
Joaquim de Matos	D. Aleixo

Strength
5,500	8,600

Casualties and losses
39 dead	700+ dead 168 prisoners

The Battle of Cailaco was a six-week siege in Timor between the Kingdom of Portugal and 15 allied Timorese kingdoms fought from 23 October to 8 December 1726.
