= The Crossing (Cardoso memoir) =

Memoir by Luís Cardoso

The Crossing is a memoir by East Timorese writer Luís Cardoso. It is based on the author's experience as a child and young man in Timor, before the Indonesian invasion, and his life as an exile in Portugal during the Indonesian occupation. According to Claudiany Pereira, it helps found in literature the imagination of a new nation
