= Atsabe =

- Town
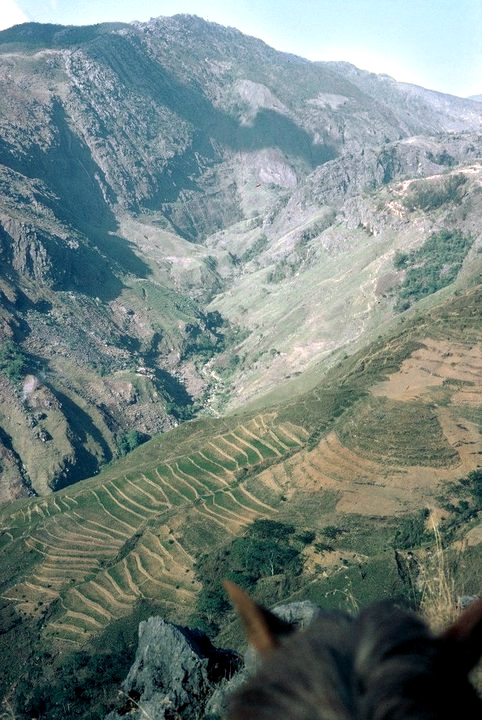
- Area of Atsabe from horseback

- Location in East Timor
- Coordinates: 8°55′28″S 125°23′54″E
- Country: Timor-Leste
- District: Atsabe

Population (2004)
  - Total: 16,034
- Climate: Am

Atsabe (in ancient sources: Artessabe, Atisasabo) is a town in Atsabe Subdistrict in the Ermera District of Timor-Leste.
