= Kemak language =

Language spoken in Timor-Leste and Indonesia

Kemak
- Region: East Timor
- Ethnicity: Kemak
- Native speakers: 72,000 (2010 census)
- Language family: Austronesian: Malayo-Polynesian; Central–Eastern; Central Timor; Nuclear Central Timor; Kemak

Official status
- Recognised minority language in: East Timor

Language codes
- ISO 639-3: kem
- Glottolog: kema1243
- ELP: Kemak
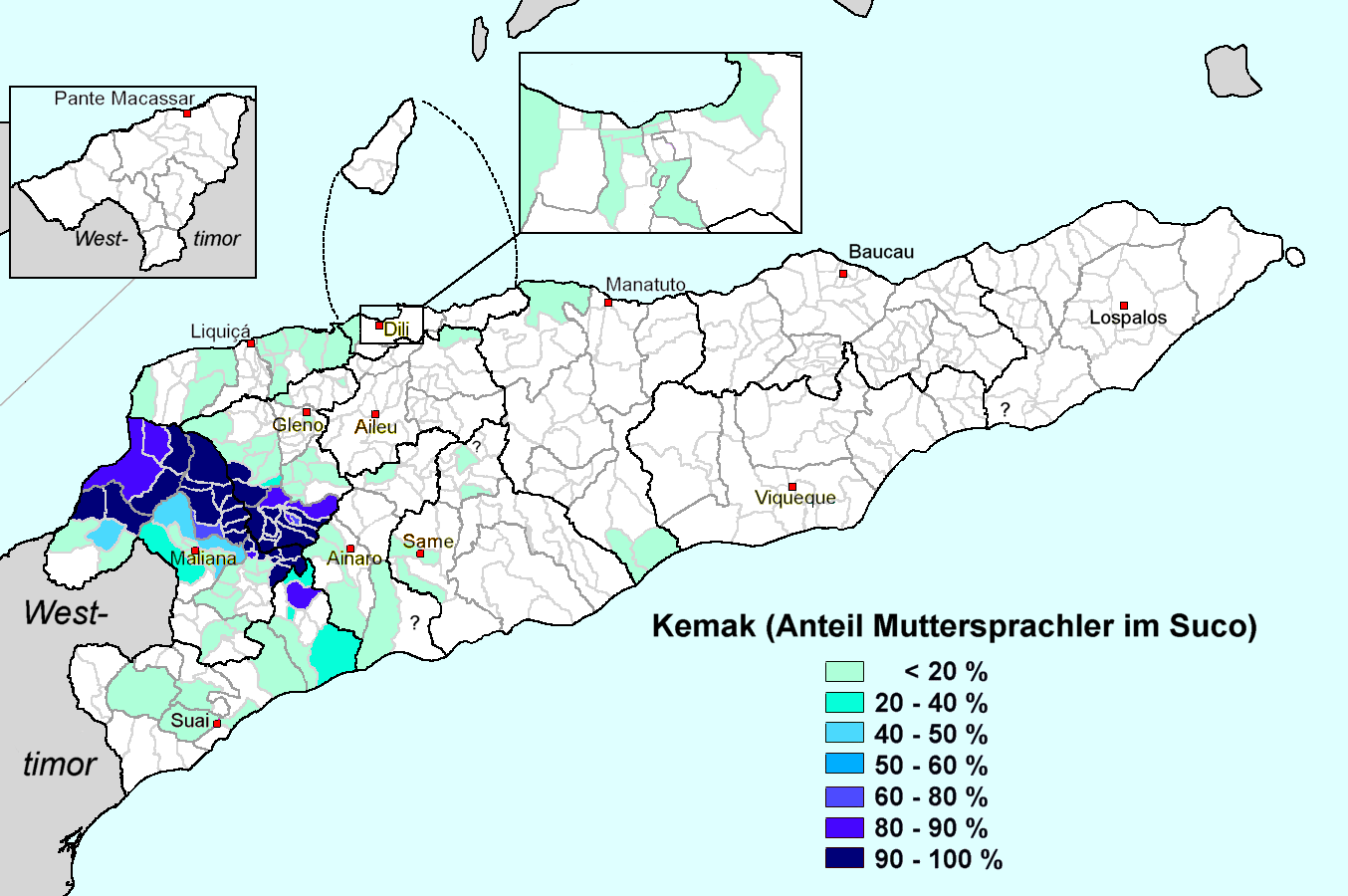
- Distribution of Kemak mother-tongue speakers in Timor-Leste

Kemak is a language spoken in Timor-Leste and in the border region of Indonesian West Timor. An alternate name is Ema. It is most closely related to Tocodede and Mambai. It has the status of one of the national languages in the Timor-Leste constitution, besides the official languages of Portuguese and Tetun. The number of speakers has fallen in recent years.

== Phonology ==
Consonants
		Labial	Dental/ Alveolar	Velar	Glottal
Nasal		m	n̪		
Plosive	voiceless	p	t	k	ʔ
Plosive	voiced	b	d	ɡ	
Fricative	voiceless		s		h
Fricative	voiced		(z)		
Rhotic			ɾ		
Lateral			l		

- Sounds /b, ɡ/ can be heard as [β, ɣ] when in intervocalic position.
- /t/ can have an allophone of [tsʰ] freely in initial position, and [tʃʰ] when before /i/.
- /s/ can be heard as [z] when in voicing assimilation, and as [tʃʰ] when preceded by /n̪/.
- /t, k/ have aspirated allophones of [kʰ, tʰ].
- /ɡ, h/ are heard as [ɡʷ, ɸ] when before /u/.

Vowels
	Front	Central	Back
Close	i		u
Mid	e		o
Open		a	

- /e, a/ can be heard as [ɪ, ɤ] when preceding or following /u/ within a syllable.
- /o, u/ can be heard as [ɔ, ɯ] when after labial consonants.
