= Belu (province) =

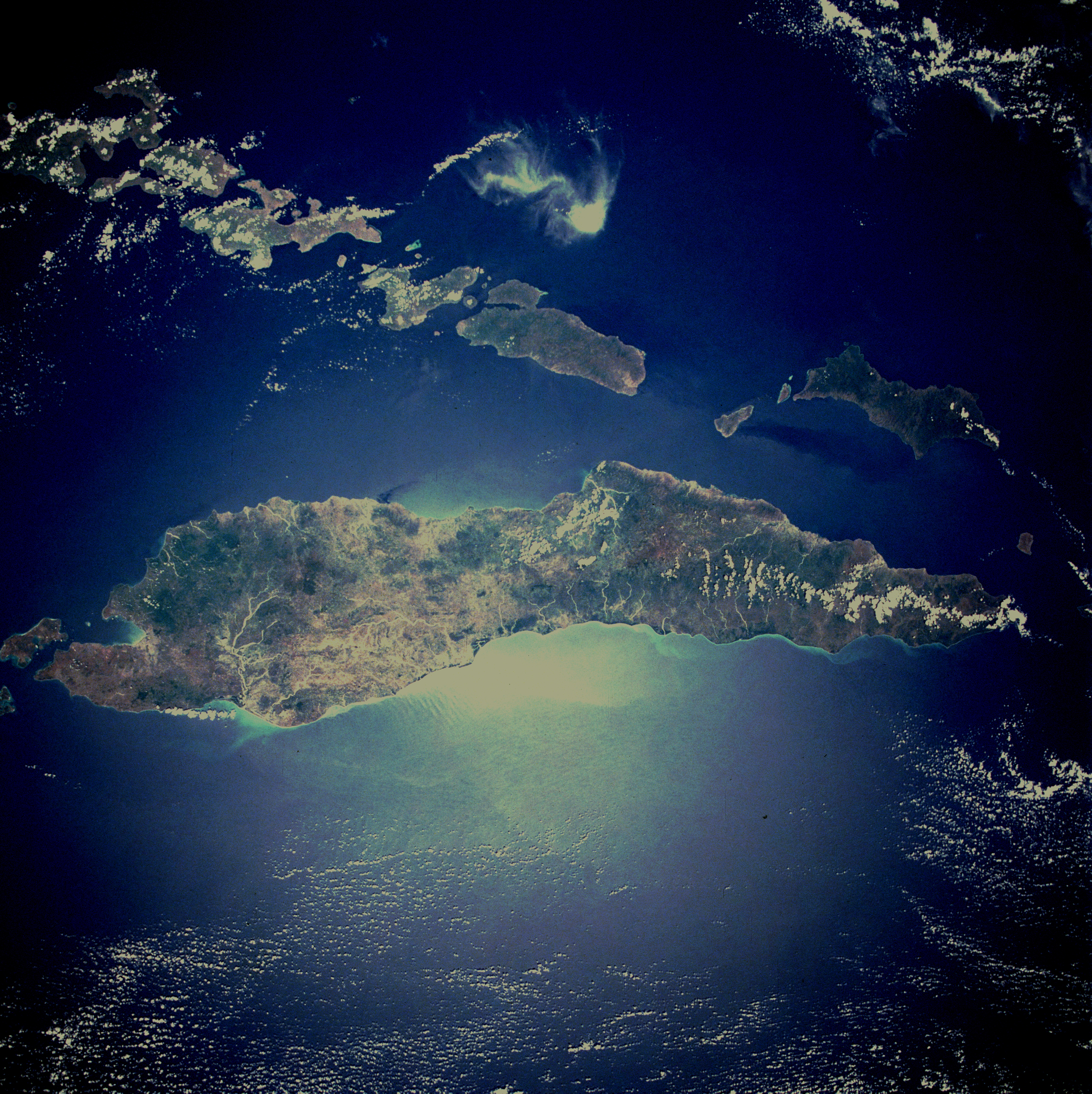
Timor island

Belu (also Belos or Behale) was the Portuguese name for eastern part of Timor island, which included the kingdoms of Wehali, Lichisana and Suai-Cabanaza. In 1756 the western part of Belu and West Timor fell to the Dutch.

== See also ==
- History of East Timor
