= Cailaco =

Town in the Bobonaro District of East Timor

Coordinates: 8°54′00″S 125°16′48″E

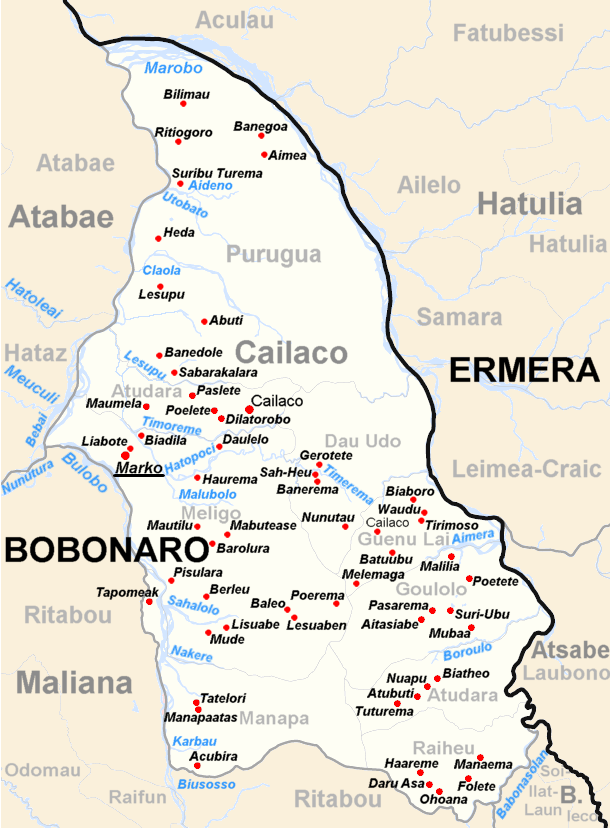
Map of Cailaco subdistrict

Cailaco is a town in Cailaco Subdistrict in the Bobonaro District of East Timor.

== Notable people ==
- Luís Cardoso, poet
