= Silvino Adolfo Morais =

East Timorese politician (1956–2022)

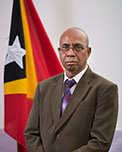
- Morais in 2017

Member of the National Parliament of East Timor
- In office 13 July 2018 – 3 January 2022

Personal details
- Born: 19 July 1956 Atabae, Portuguese Timor, Portugal
- Died: 3 January 2022 (aged 65) Dili, East Timor
- Party: Fretilin

Silvino Adolfo Morais (19 July 1956 – 3 January 2022) was an East Timorese politician. A member of Fretilin, he served in the National Parliament from 2018 to 2022. He died of a heart attack on 3 January 2022, at the age of 65.
