= COVID-19 pandemic in Timor-Leste =

COVID-19 viral pandemic in Timor-Leste

- Disease: COVID-19
- Pathogen: SARS-CoV-2
- Location: Timor-Leste
- First outbreak: Wuhan, China
- Index case: From abroad
- Arrival date: 21 March 2020 (6 years and 5 months)
- Confirmed cases: 23,163
- Active cases: 44
- Recovered: 22,981
- Deaths: 138

Government website
- covid19.gov.tl

The COVID-19 pandemic in Timor-Leste was part of the worldwide pandemic of coronavirus disease 2019 (COVID-19) caused by severe acute respiratory syndrome coronavirus 2 (SARS-CoV-2). The virus was confirmed to have reached Timor-Leste in March 2020.

== Background ==
On 12 January 2020, the World Health Organization (WHO) confirmed that a novel coronavirus was the cause of a respiratory illness in a cluster of people in Wuhan City, Hubei Province, China, which was reported to the WHO on 31 December 2019.

Unlike the SARS outbreak of 2003, the case fatality ratio for COVID-19 has been much lower, but the transmission has been significantly greater, with a significant total death toll.

== Timeline ==
Cases

Deaths

=== February 2020 ===
- On 10 February, entry for non-nationals who had visited China within the past 4 weeks was restricted. Those who had visited Hubei were banned, while those who had visited other areas of China could enter with a valid medical certificate.
- On 21 February, students who had been studying in Wuhan arrived in Timor-Leste following a period of quarantine in New Zealand.

=== March 2020 ===
- On 19 March, Timor-Leste closed its borders with Indonesia as a preventative measure.
- On 21 March, Timor-Leste confirmed its first imported COVID-19 case. The place where it started is unknown.
- Following this, schools were suspended on 22 March, and the Catholic Church canceled mass. A state of emergency was declared, and public gatherings were limited to 5 people, while all international arrivals faced a mandatory 14 days of quarantine.

=== April 2020 ===
- On 6 April, Parliament approved urgent measures to deal with the pandemic.
- On 9 April, a second case was confirmed: a person who entered the country across the land border with Indonesia. The first case, which was confirmed on March 21, has now recovered.

=== May 2020 ===
- On 15 May, Timor-Leste confirmed the recovery of its last confirmed case. Till 31-May, the country did not receive any new confirmed case.

=== August 2020 ===
- On 4 August, Timor-Leste confirmed a new case.

=== September 2020 ===
- As of 19 September, Timor-Leste had 27 total cases, out of which 26 have recovered.

=== October 2020 ===
- As of 4 October, Timor-Leste was covid-free with all the 28 total cases recovered from the virus.
- As of 14 October, there 29 total cases, with 1 active case and the rest recovered from the virus.
- As of 28 October, there 30 total cases, with 1 active case and 29 have recovered.

=== November 2020 ===
- As of 11 November, there were 30 cases in Timor-Leste, with 1 active case and 29 have recovered.
- As of 15 November, there were 30 cases in the country, all of them recovered.

=== December 2020 ===
- As of 6 December, there were 31 cases in Timor-Leste, with 1 active case and 30 have recovered.
- As of 19 December, there were 31 cases in Timor-Leste, with 1 active case and 30 have recovered.
- As of 21 December, there were 31 cases in Timor-Leste, all of them cured and no active case.
- As of 24 December, total number of cases in Timor-Leste was 41, including 10 active cases. Rest have recovered from the virus.
- As of 28 December, total number of cases in Timor-Leste was 44, including 12 active cases, 32 have recovered.

=== January 2021 ===
- As of 6 January, total number of cases in Timor-Leste was 49, including 9 active cases, 40 have recovered.
- As of 11 January, total number of cases was 49, including 8 active cases, 41 recoveries.
- As of 14 January, total number of cases was 51, including 6 active cases, 45 recoveries.
- As of 19 January, total number of cases was 52, including 3 active cases, 49 recoveries.
- As of 22 January, total number of cases was 53, including 4 active cases, 49 recoveries.
- As of 26 January, total number of cases was 67, including 17 active cases, 50 cures.
- As of 28 January, total number of cases was 68, including 14 active cases, 54 recoveries.

=== February 2021 ===
- As of 2 February, total number of cases in Timor-Leste was 75, including 20 active cases, 55 have recovered.
- As of 7 February, total number of cases in Timor-Leste was 80, including 19 active cases, 61 have recovered.
- As of 9 February, total number of cases in Timor-Leste was 86, including 25 active cases, 61 have recovered.
- As of 15 February, total number of cases in Timor-Leste was 102, including 40 active cases, 62 recoveries.
- As of 24 February, total number of cases in Timor-Leste was 109, including 21 active cases, 88 cures.

=== March 2021 ===
- As of 7 March, total number of cases in Timor-Leste was 119, including 25 active cases, 94 have recovered.
- Beginning March 7, due to a huge spike in cases and the collapse of the country's COVID-zero strategy, the capital, Dili, was put on lockdown, and face coverings were made obligatory nationwide.
- As of 22 March, total number of cases in Timor-Leste was 335, including 211 active cases, 124 recoveries.
- As of 29 March, total number of cases in Timor-Leste was 512, including 342 active cases, 170 cures.

=== April 2021 ===
- As of 1 April, total number of cases in Timor-Leste was 643, including 451 active cases, 192 cures.
- As of 4 April, total number of cases in Timor-Leste was 714, including 167 active cases, 447 cures.
- On 6 April, the first death due to the COVID-19, a 44-year-old woman, was recorded in the country amid concerns that Tropical Cyclone Seroja, which had already wreaked havoc in Timor-Leste, would hamper disease prevention efforts.
- As of 11 April, total number of cases in Timor-Leste was 947, including 503 active cases, 443 recoveries and 1 death.
- As of 13 April, total number of cases in Timor-Leste was 1,074, including 522 active cases, 550 cures and 2 deaths.
- As of 22 April, total number of cases in Timor-Leste was 1,657, including 860 active cases, 795 cures and 2 fatalities.

=== May 2021 ===
- As of 2 May, total number of cases in Timor-Leste was 2,444, including 1,257 active cases, 1,183 cures and 4 deaths.
- As of 11 May, total number of cases was 3,353, including 1,665 active cases, 1,683 cures and 5 deaths.
- As of 18 May, total number of cases was 4,765, including 2,238 active cases, 2,517 recoveries and 10 deaths.
- As of 25 May, total number of cases was 5,816, including 2,601 active cases, 3,202 cures and 13 fatalities.
- As of 27 May, total number of cases was 6,549, including 2,727 active cases, 3,717 cures and 15 deaths.

=== June 2021 ===
- As of 18 June, total number of cases in Timor-Leste was 8,504, including 1,185 active cases, 7,300 cures and 19 deaths.

=== July to September 2021 ===
- As of 13 July, total number of cases in Timor-Leste was 9,906, including 901 active cases, 8,980 cures and 25 deaths.
- As of 30 August, total number of cases in Timor-Leste was 16402, including 4554 active cases, 11786 recoveries and 62 deaths.
- As of 10 September, total number of cases in Timor-Leste was 18308, including 3295 active cases, 14925 recoveries and 88 deaths.
- As of 23 September, total number of cases was 19206, including 1274 active cases, 17824 recoveries and 108 deaths.
- As of 23 September, total number of cases is 19455, including 778 active cases, 18562 recoveries and 115 deaths.

=== October to December 2021 ===
- As of 10 October, total number of cases in Timor-Leste was 19673, including 222 active cases, 19332 recoveries and 119 deaths.
- As of 20 November, total number of cases was 19819, including 11 active cases, 19686 recoveries and 122 deaths.
- As of 30 November, due to all community transmission being suppressed, the state of emergency ended, along with nearly all restrictions. The requirement to wear a face covering outdoors was lifted, while the few requirements remaining (such as wearing a mask indoors) are reportedly ignored by most of the public. Quarantine for fully vaccinated arrivals is no longer required, but a test must be taken 48 hours after arrival.
- As of 29 December, total number of cases in Timor-Leste was 19833, including 6 active cases, 19705 recoveries and 122 deaths.

=== January to March 2022 ===
- As of 5 January, total number of cases in Timor-Leste was 19842, including 9 active cases, 19711 recoveries and 122 deaths.
- As of 9 January, total number of cases was 19856, including 21 active cases, 19713 cures and 122 deaths.
- As of 22 January, total number of cases was 19866, including 13 active cases, 19731 cures and 122 fatalities.
- As of 26 January, total number of cases was 19871, including 10 active cases, 19739 recoveries and 122 fatalities.
- As of 5 February, total number of cases was 20328, including 122 active cases, 19749 cures and 122 fatal cases.
- As of 12 February, total number of cases was 21401, including 1292 active cases, 19986 recoveries and 123 deaths.
- As of 21 February, total number of cases was 22406, including 1077 active cases, 21204 recoveries and 125 deaths.
- As of 25 February, total number of cases was 22584, including 839 active cases, 21619 cures and 126 deaths.
- As of 2 March, total number of cases is 22693, including 425 active cases, 22140 have been cured and 128 deaths.
- As of 15 March, total number of cases is 22789, including 64 active cases, 22596 have been cured and 129 deaths.

=== April to June 2022 ===
- As of 8 April, total number of cases was 22842, including 15 active cases, 22697 have been cured and 130 deaths.
- As of 26 April, total number of cases was 22860, including 16 active cases, 22714 recoveries and 130 deaths.
- As of 2 May, total number of cases is 22871, including 18 active cases, 22723 have been recovered and 130 fatal cases.
- As of 12 May, total number of cases is 22886, including 26 active cases, 22730 cures and 130 deaths.
- As of 26 May, total number of cases is 22890, including 11 active cases, 22748 cures and 131 fatalities.
- As of 14 June, total number of cases is 22928, including 21 active cases, 22928 cures and 133 deaths.
- As of 24 June, total number of cases is 22945, including 14 active cases, 22798 recoveries and 133 deaths.

=== July to September 2022 ===
- As of 8 July, total number of cases is 22961 in Timor-Leste, including 13 active cases, 22815 cures and 133 deaths.
- As of 19 July, total number of cases is 22975, including 13 active cases, 22829 recoveries and 133 deaths.
- As of 26 August, total number of cases is 23152, including 45 active cases, 22970 recoveries and 137 fatal cases.
- As of 7 September, total number of cases is 23163, including 44 active cases, 22981 recoveries and 138 deaths.

=== January 2023 onwards ===
- As of 30 January 2023, total number of cases in Timor-Leste was 23102, including 175 active cases, 22981 recoveries and 138 deaths.

== Statistics ==
=== Cases by municipalities ===
Confirmed positives cases by municipalities.
Municipality	Cases	Recovered	Deaths	References
Aileu	126	125	1	
Ainaro	227	224	3	
Baucau	1,540	1,531	7	
Bobonaro	603	593	9	
Cova Lima	787	783	3	
Dili	13,728	13,642	81	
Ermera	1,113	1,111	2	
Lautém	183	178	5	
Liquiçà	125	124	1	
Manatuto	203	201	2	
Manufahi	265	265	0	
Oecusse	393	390	3	
Viqueque	518	514	5	
13/13	19,812	19,682	122	
Last update 16 November 2021.
