= Women in Timor-Leste =

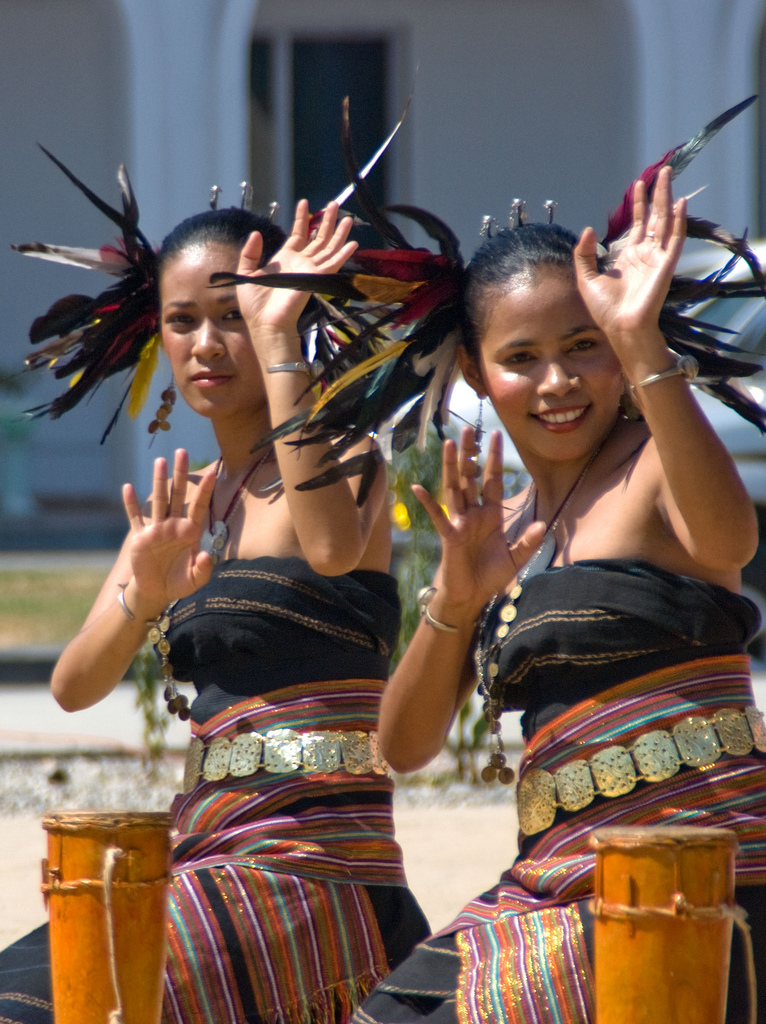
- A pair of East Timorese women performing a traditional dance.

General statistics
- Maternal mortality (per 100,000): 300
- Women in parliament: 38.5% (2012)
- Women in labour force: 38.4% (2011)

Gender Inequality Index
- Value: 0.378 (2021)
- Rank: 89th out of 191

Global Gender Gap Index
- Value: 0.730 (2022)
- Rank: 56th out of 146

Women in Timor-Leste (East Timor) face traditional limitatons to status. They may not inherit or own property, and traditional cultural expectations are that women normally belong to the home. They also face high levels of domestic violence, and East Timorese women have been victims of sex trafficking to other countries. However, women are increasingly active in East Timorese politics. In 2023 Parliament approved November 3 as National Women's Day.

== Family care ==
East Timorese women usually have between 6 and 7 children on average. Based on a UN study, it was found that among those women that were between ages 20 to 24, almost more than half of them had at least one child, and of those, 60 percent had their first child before they were 19.

Many East Timorese women were teen mothers, and had dropped out of high school due to the responsibilities and pressure from having a child. In 2010, the government introduced a new policy that will focus on getting and keeping young mothers in school. This began with sex education classes and a transformation of the junior high school curriculum.

== Societal rules ==
There are many rules women in Timor-Leste follow for precaution to not be victims of sexual abuse such as not being able to show their bare arms, wear low cut tops, short skirts or bikinis. Timorese women were also not allowed to go outside their living area alone, and if they were single they could not be seen alone with a man who is not related to them. The East Timorese women also are expected to be stay-at-home mothers and can not inherit or own their property.

== Domestic violence ==
Apart from these customary concepts, East Timorese women also confront domestic violence. Rape cases and sexual slavery were allegedly committed by East Timorese pro-integration militias during the September 1999 crisis in East Timor. One of the organizations that promote empowerment and foster gender equality for the women of Timor-Leste is the United Nations Development Fund for Women (UNIFEM). In 2010, a law was passed making domestic violence a public crime, but the practice remained prevalent nevertheless. In a 2009–10 Demographic and Health Survey, 36% of married women reported having experienced physical, psychological or sexual violence from their husband or partner, but only 24% reported discussing this with anyone and only 4% reported seeking help from the police.

According to the same survey, 71% of men believe that the wife's neglecting children justifies the husband's beating her, while 72% of women believe that a husband is justified in beating his wife if she goes out without informing him. According to activists in non-governmental organizations such as Asisténsia Legál ba Feto no Labarik, domestic violence is severely under-reported and the punishments are not deterrent: in one case, a man who "stabbed his wife in the back of the head and struck her repeatedly with a block of wood, after an argument about feeding their children" only received a suspended jail sentence of seven months.

== Sex trafficking ==
Citizen and foreign women and girls have been victims of sex trafficking in Timor-Leste. They are raped and physically and psychologically harmed in brothels, hotels, homes, and other locations throughout the country.

== Politics ==
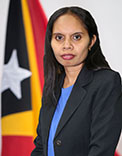
Maria Angelina Lopes Saremento, Vice-President of the National Parliament.

Women are active in East Timorese politics.

== See also ==
- Women in Asia
