= Independence Day (Timor-Leste) =

National holiday in Timor-Leste

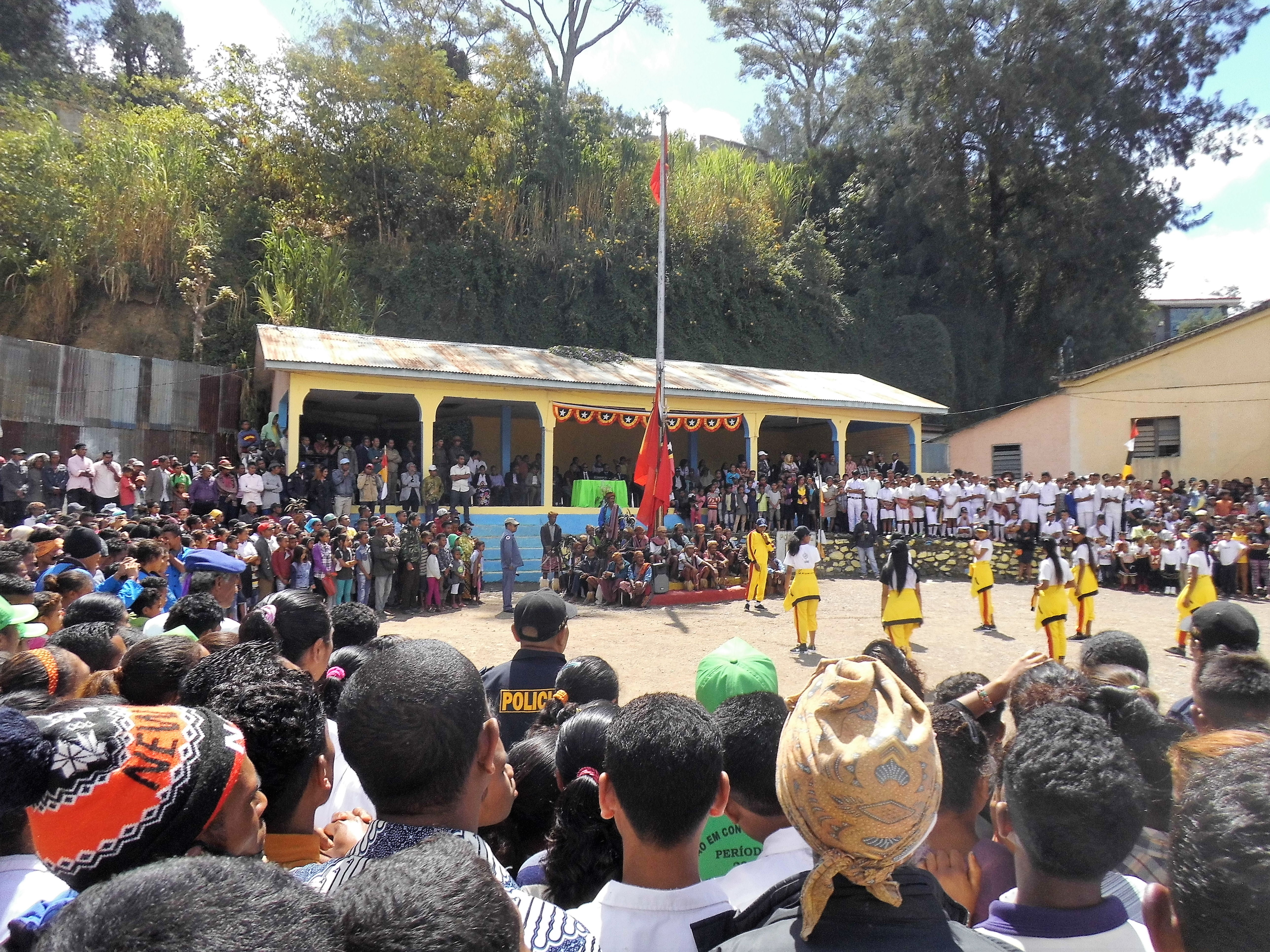
2018 Independence Day celebrations in Maubisse.

Timor-Leste's Independence Day or Day of Restoration of Independence is a national holiday in Timor-Leste on 20 May held to celebrate independence of the country from Indonesian occupation and United Nations administration in 2002.
