= History of Timor-Leste =

Overview of East Timorese history

Timor-Leste, officially the Democratic Republic of Timor-Leste, is an island country in Southeast Asia. The country comprises the eastern half of the island of Timor and the nearby islands of Atauro and Jaco. The first inhabitants are thought to be descendant of Australoid and Melanesian peoples. The Portuguese began to trade with Timor by the early 16th century and colonised it throughout the mid-century. Skirmishing with the Dutch in the region eventually resulted in an 1859 treaty for which Portugal ceded the western half of the island. Imperial Japan occupied East Timor during World War II, but Portugal resumed colonial authority after the Japanese surrender.

East Timor declared itself independent from Portugal in 1975, but was invaded by Indonesia. The country was later incorporated as a province of Indonesia. During the subsequent two-decade occupation, a campaign of pacification ensued. Although Indonesia did make substantial investment in infrastructures during its occupation in East Timor, dissatisfaction remained widespread. From 1975 to 1999, there were an estimated 102,800 conflict-related deaths (approximately 18,600 killings and 84,200 'excess' deaths from hunger and illness), the majority of which occurred during the Indonesian occupation.

In 1999, in a UN-sponsored referendum, an overwhelming majority of East Timorese voted for independence from Indonesia. Immediately following the referendum, anti-independence Timorese militias – organised and supported by the Indonesian military – commenced a scorched earth campaign. The militias killed approximately 1,400 Timorese and forcibly pushed 300,000 people into West Timor as refugees. The majority of the country's infrastructure was destroyed during this attack. The International Force East Timor (INTERFET) was deployed to the country and brought the violence to an end. Following a United Nations-administered transition period, Timor-Leste was internationally recognised as an independent nation in 2002. It is the poorest country in Southeast Asia with a 20% unemployment rate, and approximately one third of the population is illiterate.

== Pre-colonial history ==
The island of Timor was populated as part of the human migrations that have shaped Australasia more generally. As of 2019, the oldest traces of human settlement are 43,000 to 44,000 years old, and were found in the Laili cave in Manatuto Municipality. These early settlers had high-level maritime skills, and by implication the technology needed to make ocean crossings to reach Australia and other islands, as they were catching and consuming large numbers of big deep sea fish such as tuna. One of the oldest fish hooks in the world, dated between 16,000 and 23,000 years old, was excavated at the Jerimalai cave. It is believed that survivors from three waves of migration still live in the country. The first is described by anthropologists as people of the Veddo-Australoid type.

Around 3000 BC, a second migration brought Melanesians. The earlier Veddo-Australoid peoples withdrew at this time to the mountainous interior. Finally, proto-Malays arrived from south China and north Indochina. Timorese origin myths tell of ancestors that sailed around the eastern end of Timor arriving on land in the south.

These multiple waves of migrations combined with the mountainous geography of the island led to a diverse mix of languages and culture. What is now Timor-Leste was split between up to 46 kingdoms. However, there was little influence from the large Islamic Javanese powers to the west.

The later Timorese were not seafarers, rather they were land focused people who rarely made contact with other islands. Timor was part of a region of small islands with small populations of similarly land-focused people that now make up eastern Indonesia. Contact with the outside world was via networks of foreign seafaring traders from as far as China and India that served the archipelago. Outside products brought to the region included metal goods, rice, fine textiles, and coins exchanged for local spices, sandalwood, deer horn, bees' wax, and slaves.

Several fortifications uncovered in Timor were built between 1000 and 1300. Climatic changes, in particular during the Little Ice Age, and the increased trade in sandalwood, are thought to have increased tensions around the control of resources during that time.

The first known mention of Timor in writing can be found in the 13th-century Chinese Zhu Fan Zhi, which describes various products and civilisations found outside China. In the Zhu Fan Zhi, Timor is called Ti-Wen and is noted for its sandalwood. In 1365, the Nagarakretagama, which contains descriptions of the Majapahit Empire at its peak, identifies Timor as an island within Majapahit's realm. However, as Portuguese chronologist Tomé Pires wrote in the 16th century, all islands east of Java were called "Timor".

Early European explorers report that the island had a number of small chiefdoms or princedoms in the early 16th century. One of the most significant is the Wehali kingdom in central Timor, to which the Tetum, Bunaq and Kemak ethnic groups were aligned.

The first circumnavigation of the world, the Magellan expedition, visited Timor and they recorded that Lucoes (People from Luzon, Philippines) traded in East Timor in order to gather sandalwood for export abroad.

== Portuguese rule ==
Arms of Portuguese Timor (1935–1975)

=== Colonization ===
The first Europeans to arrive in the area were the Portuguese, who landed near present-day Pante Macassar. These Portuguese were traders that arrived between 1512 and 1515. However, only in 1556 did a group of Dominican friars establish their missionary work in the area, settling just north in Solor. War with the Netherlands reduced Portuguese control in the Malay archipelago, limiting them mostly to the Lesser Sunda Islands. Later wars further reduced Portuguese influence, with Solor falling in 1613, and Kupang in the west of Timor falling in 1653.

Dutch and Portuguese sources relate that the island was divided into two collections of kingdoms. Sixteen kingdoms were grouped into Servião in the west, while in the east fifty kingdoms were part of Belos.

By the seventeenth century the village of Lifau – today part of the Oecussi enclave – had become the centre of Portuguese activities. At this time, the Portuguese began to convert the Timorese to Catholicism. Starting in 1642, a military expedition led by the Portuguese Francisco Fernandes took place. The aim of this expedition was to weaken the power of the Timor kings and even as this expedition was made by the Topasses, the 'Black Portuguese', it succeeded to extend the Portuguese influence into the interior of the country. In 1702 a governor was appointed for Solor and Timor, based in Lifau. Portuguese control over the territory was tenuous, with opposition coming from Dominican friars, the Topasses, restive vassal kingdoms, and the south Sulawesi-based Gowa and Talloq sultanates. A rebellion in 1725 led to a campaign by Portuguese forces and allies from the north coast, which culminated in Portuguese victory at the 1726 Battle of Cailaco. In 1769, seeking to wrest control from the Topasses, the Portuguese governor moved his administration along with 1,200 people from Lifau to what would become Dili. The control of colonial administrators, largely restricted to Dili, had to rely on traditional tribal chieftains for control and influence.

For both Portugal and the Netherlands, Timor remained a low priority with little presence outside of the cities of Dili and Kupang. Nonetheless, continuing disputes over competing spheres of influence with the Dutch led to a number of treaties aimed at formalising borders and eliminating enclaves. The border between Portuguese Timor and the Dutch East Indies was formally decided in 1859 with the Treaty of Lisbon. Portugal received the eastern half, together with the north coast pocket of Oecussi. There are competing views over whether this border reflected existing cultural differences. This 1859 treaty saw Portugal take control of Maubara, where the Dutch had begun coffee cultivation, in exchange for formally relinquishing claims in Solor and Flores.

In 1844 Timor, along with Macau and Solor, was removed from the jurisdiction of Portuguese India. A few years later in 1850, Portuguese Timor was removed from the jurisdiction of the governor of Macau, before being returned to the jurisdiction of Portuguese India in 1856. In 1863, Dili was declared a city (although the news may not have arrived to the city until the next year), and East Timor became directly subordinate to the Lisbon government. In 1866 the territory was again put under the jurisdiction of Macau. An 1887 mutiny in Dili led to the death of the governor at the time. The territory was separated from Macau for the last time in 1896, again coming directly under the jurisdiction of Lisbon, and becoming a full province in 1909.

In 1910–12, the East Timorese rebelled against Portugal. Troops from Mozambique and naval gunfire were brought in to suppress the rebels. The definitive border was drawn by The Hague in 1914, and it remains the international boundary between the modern states of Timor-Leste and Indonesia. Maucatar became part of Portuguese Timor during this period. The Portuguese Timorese pataca became the sole official currency in 1915. Difficulties in communication and logistics arising as a result of World War I led to trade disruptions. Economic difficulties and an inability to pay salaries led to a small revolt in 1919.

For the Portuguese, East Timor remained little more than a neglected trading post until the late nineteenth century. Investment in infrastructure, health, and education was minimal. The island was seen as a way to exile those who the state in Lisbon saw as problems – these included political prisoners as well as ordinary criminals. Portuguese ruled through a traditional system of liurai (local chiefs). Sandalwood remained the main export crop with coffee exports becoming significant in the mid-nineteenth century. In places where Portuguese rule was asserted, it tended to be brutal and exploitative. At the beginning of the twentieth century, a faltering home economy prompted the Portuguese to extract greater wealth from its colonies. Portuguese authorities created an administrative structure based on the existing kingdoms, while also creating a new level of administration under them, the suco. This new level was created around villages, or groups of villages linked by kinship. These new administrative boundaries thus reflected family ties, and strengthened family power as villages gained administrative power. This created a permanent shift of powers from the level of the kingdom to that of the villages.

The administration of José Celestino da Silva began in 1893. He aimed to make the territory profitable. To gain more control he reduced the power of local kings, and even eliminated smaller and more disloyal ones. Implementation of the head tax required a census, and depended on the loyalty of the local leaders who would be responsible for collection. He also sought to impose a head tax which collected tax from each household, necessitating a census of the territory to count these households. The head tax was imposed by Silva's successor, Eduardo Augusto Marques, once the census was complete. The needs of the census meant power at this time also flowed to leaders of aldeias, a smaller unit that sucos whose leaders were responsible for some tax collection and were given formal military ranks.

The remaining power of the kings further diminished after the 5 October 1910 revolution made Portugal a republic, especially as many Timorese kings were monarchist sympathisers. The kings now operated Administrative posts on behalf of the Portuguese.

Portuguese Timor had been a place of exile for political and social opponents deported from the metropolis since the late nineteenth century. Among them a large proportion were members of the anarchist and anarcho-syndicalist movement, which until the Second World War was the most influential of the left-wing movements in Portugal. The main waves of deportations to Timor were in 1896, 1927, and 1931. Some of the activists continued their resistance even in exile. After World War II, the remaining exiles were pardoned and allowed to return.

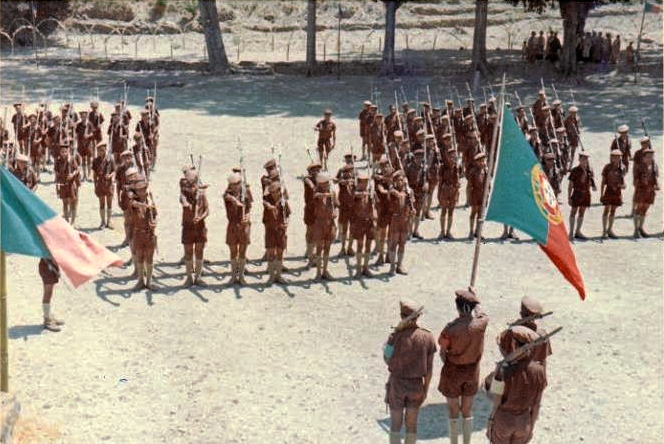
Portuguese soldiers in East Timor

Although Portugal was neutral during World War II, in December 1941, Portuguese Timor was occupied by Australian and Dutch forces, which were expecting a Japanese invasion. This Australian military intervention dragged Portuguese Timor into the Pacific War but it also slowed the Japanese expansion. When the Japanese did occupy Timor, in February 1942, a 400-strong Dutch-Australian force and large numbers of Timorese volunteers engaged them in a one-year guerrilla campaign. After the allied evacuation in February 1943 the East Timorese continued fighting the Japanese, with comparatively little collaboration with the enemy taking place. This assistance cost the civilian population dearly: Japanese forces burned many villages and seized food supplies. The Japanese occupation resulted in the deaths of 40,000–70,000 Timorese.

Under Japanese rule, there were changes to the administrative structures that created larger districts (the former kingdoms) and a reduced number of suco.

=== Post–World War II ===
Portuguese Timor was handed back to Portugal after the war, but Portugal continued to neglect the colony. Very little investment was made in infrastructure, education and healthcare. The colony was declared an overseas province of the Portuguese Republic in 1951. Locally, authority rested with the Portuguese governor and the legislative council, as well as local chiefs or liurai. Only a small minority of Timorese were educated, and even fewer went on to university in Portugal (there were no universities in the territory until 2000).

During this time, Indonesia did not express any interest in Portuguese Timor, despite the anti-colonial rhetoric of President Sukarno. This was partly as Indonesia was preoccupied with gaining control of West Irian, now called Papua, which had been retained by the Netherlands after Indonesian independence. In fact, at the United Nations, Indonesian diplomats stressed that their country did not seek control over any territory outside the former Netherlands East Indies, explicitly mentioning Portuguese Timor.

In 1960 East Timor gained the right to self-determination under international law, as a non-self-governing territory. It retained this status, with Portugal as the administering power, throughout Indonesian rule.

The small 1959 Viqueque rebellion saw attempts by the rebels to seek support outside their local area, although it did not overcome local rivalries. Its calls for better services and rights led to some changes in Portuguese policy such as increases in education and civil employment. Basic schooling was increased, and more advanced schools that included secondary education were available to the most Portuguese individuals: those considered mestiço or assimilado. A catholic school in Soibada, the Seminary of Our Lady of Fatima in Dare, and the Liceu Dr. Francisco Machado were important educational establishments during this time. Fatumaca College was established near Baucau in 1969, and an Escola Tecnica was set up in 1973. The politicians who came to prominence at the end of Portuguese rule tended to have studied in these schools, and some cited the Viqueque rebellion as an inspiration. This "Timorisation", which resulted in greater local participation in administration and the military, remained mostly limited to the aforementioned upper class, and did not substantially affect the majority of the population.

== Decolonisation, coup, and independence ==
The decolonisation process instigated by the 1974 Portuguese revolution saw Portugal effectively abandon the colony of Portuguese Timor. A civil war between supporters of Portuguese Timorese political parties, the left-wing Fretilin and the right-wing UDT, broke out in 1975 as UDT attempted a coup which Fretilin resisted with the help of local Portuguese military.

One of the first acts of the new government in Lisbon was to appoint a new governor for the colony on 18 November 1974, in the form of Mário Lemos Pires, who would ultimately be, as events were to prove, the last governor of Portuguese Timor.

One of his first decrees made upon his arrival in Dili was to legalise political parties in preparation for elections to a Constituent Assembly in 1976. Three main political parties were formed:

- The União Democrática Timorense (UDT, Timorese Democratic Union), was supported by the traditional elites, initially argued for a continued association with Lisbon, or as they put it in Tetum, mate bandera hum — 'in the shadow of the [Portuguese] flag', but later adopted a 'gradualist' approach to independence. One of its leaders, Mário Viegas Carrascalão, one of the few Timorese to have been educated at university in Portugal, later became Indonesian Governor of East Timor during the 1980s and early 1990s, although with the demise of Indonesian rule, he would change to supporting independence.
- The Associação Social Democrática Timorense (ASDT, Timorese Social Democratic Association) supported a rapid movement to independence. It later changed its name to Frente Revolucionária de Timor-Leste Independente (Revolutionary Front of Independent East Timor or Fretilin). Fretilin was regarded by many in Australia and Indonesia as being Marxist, its name sounding reminiscent of FRELIMO in Mozambique. The party committed itself to "the universal doctrines of socialism".
- The Associação Popular Democrática Timorense ("Apodeti", Timorese Popular Democratic Association) supported integration with Indonesia, as an autonomous province, but had little grassroots support. One of its leaders, Abílio Osório Soares, later served as the last Indonesian-appointed governor of East Timor. Apodeti drew support from a few liurai in the border region, some of whom had collaborated with the Japanese during the Second World War. It also had some support in the small Muslim minority, although Marí Alkatiri, a Muslim, was a prominent Fretilin leader, and became prime minister in 2002.

Other smaller parties included Klibur Oan Timur Asuwain (KOTA, Tetum for 'Sons of the Mountain Warriors'), which sought to create a form of monarchy involving the local liurai, and the Partido Trabalhista (Labour Party), but neither had any significant support. They would, however, collaborate with Indonesia. The Associação Democrática para a Integração de Timor-Leste na Austrália (ADITLA) advocated integration with Australia, but folded after the Australian government emphatically ruled out the idea.

This period saw the emergence of a unified national consciousness among the social elites who led the newly established political parties. The main parties all promoted freedom of expression, association, and religion, although party support was linked to the home regions of each party's leaders. Fretilin explicitly sought to develop an overarching national identity, which was labelled maubere.

=== Parties compete, foreign powers take interest ===
Developments in Portuguese Timor during 1974 and 1975 were watched closely by Indonesia and Australia. Suharto's "New Order", which had effectively eliminated Indonesia's Communist Party PKI in 1965, was alarmed by what it saw as the increasingly left-leaning Fretilin, and by the prospect of a small independent leftist state in the midst of the archipelago inspiring separatism in parts of the surrounding archipelago.

Australia's Labor prime minister, Gough Whitlam, had developed a close working relationship with the Indonesian leader, and also followed events with concern. At a meeting in the Javanese town of Wonosobo in 1974, he told Suharto that an independent Portuguese Timor would be 'an unviable state, and a potential threat to the stability of the region'. While recognising the need for an act of self-determination, he considered integration with Indonesia to be in Portuguese Timor's best interests.

In local elections on 13 March 1975, Fretilin and UDT emerged as the largest parties, having previously formed an alliance to campaign for independence.

Indonesian military intelligence, known as BAKIN, began attempting to cause divisions between the pro-independence parties, and promote the support of Apodeti. This was known as Operasi Komodo or 'Operation Komodo' after the giant Komodo lizard found in the eastern Indonesian island of the same name. Many Indonesian military figures held meetings with UDT leaders, who made it plain that Jakarta would not tolerate a Fretilin-led administration in an independent East Timor. The coalition between Fretilin and UDT later broke up.

During the course of 1975, Portugal became increasingly detached from political developments in its colony, becoming embroiled in civil unrest and political crises, and more concerned with decolonisation in its African colonies of Angola and Mozambique than with Portuguese Timor. Many local leaders saw independence as unrealistic, and were open to discussions with Jakarta over Portuguese Timor's incorporation into the Indonesian state.

=== The coup ===
On 11 August 1975, the UDT mounted a coup, in a bid to halt the increasing popularity of Fretilin. Portuguese Governor Mário Lemos Pires fled to the offshore island of Atauro, north of the capital, Dili, from where he later attempted to broker an agreement between the two sides. He was urged by Fretilin to return and resume the decolonisation process, but he insisted that he was awaiting instructions from the government in Lisbon, now increasingly uninterested.

Indonesia sought to portray the conflict as a civil war, which had plunged Portuguese Timor into chaos, but after only a month, aid and relief agencies from Australia and elsewhere visited the territory, and reported that the situation was stable. Nevertheless, many UDT supporters had fled across the border into Indonesian Timor, where they were coerced into supporting integration with Indonesia. In October 1975, in the border town of Balibo, two Australian television crews (the "Balibo Five") reporting on the conflict were killed by Indonesian forces, after they witnessed Indonesian incursions into Portuguese Timor.

=== Unilateral declaration of independence ===
While Fretilin had sought the return of the Portuguese governor, pointedly flying the Portuguese flag from government offices, the deteriorating situation meant that it had to make an appeal to the world for international support, independently of Portugal.

On 28 November 1975, Fretilin made a unilateral declaration of independence of the Democratic Republic of East Timor (República Democrática de Timor-Leste in Portuguese). This was not recognised by either Portugal, Indonesia, or Australia; however, the UDI state received formal diplomatic recognition from six countries that were led by leftist or Marxist–Leninist parties, namely Albania, Cape Verde, Guinea, Guinea-Bissau, Mozambique, and São Tomé and Príncipe. Fretilin's Francisco Xavier do Amaral became the first president, while Fretilin leader Nicolau dos Reis Lobato was prime minister.

Indonesia's response was to have UDT, Apodeti, KOTA and Trabalhista leaders sign a declaration calling for integration with Indonesia called the Balibo Declaration, although it was drafted by Indonesian intelligence and signed in Bali, Indonesia not Balibo, Portuguese Timor. Xanana Gusmão, now the country's prime minister, described this as the 'Balibohong Declaration', a pun on the Indonesian word for 'lie'.

Fretilin restored the original administrative posts, hoping to shore up local support by more closely reflecting traditional kingdoms.

=== East Timor solidarity movement ===
An international East Timor solidarity movement arose in response to the 1975 invasion of East Timor by Indonesia and the occupation that followed. The movement was supported by churches, human rights groups, and peace campaigners, but developed its own organisations and infrastructure in many countries. Many demonstrations and vigils backed legislative actions to cut off military supplies to Indonesia. The movement was most extensive in neighbouring Australia, in Portugal, in the Philippines and the former Portuguese colonies in Africa, but had significant force in the United States, Canada and Europe.

José Ramos-Horta, later president of Timor-Leste, stated in a 2007 interview that the solidarity movement "was instrumental. They were like our peaceful foot soldiers, and fought many battles for us."

== Indonesian invasion and annexation ==
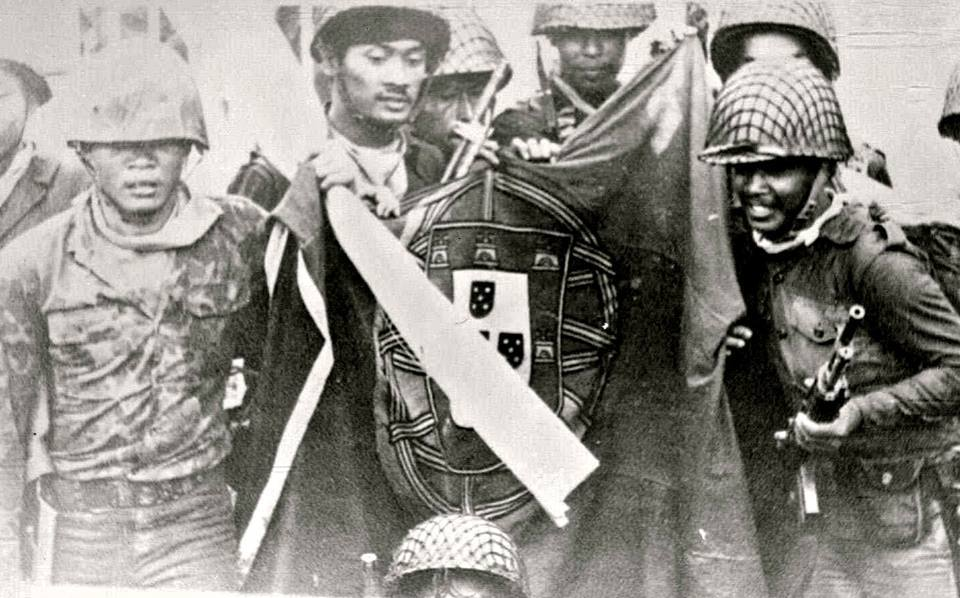
Indonesian soldiers pose in November 1975 in Batugade, East Timor with a captured Portuguese flag.

The Indonesian invasion of East Timor began on 7 December 1975. Indonesian forces launched a massive air and sea invasion, known as Operasi Seroja, or 'Operation Komodo', almost entirely using US-supplied equipment even if Kissinger feared this would be revealed to the public. Moreover, according to declassified documents released by the National Security Archive (NSA) in December 2001, the United States gave its agreement to Indonesia for the invasion. In fact, when the Indonesian president Suharto asked the understanding of taking rapid drastic action in East Timor to US president Gerald Ford, he replied, "We will understand and not press you on the issue. We understand the problem and the intentions you have." The Australian government did not react to this invasion. The reason may be the existence of oil found in the waters between Indonesia and Australia. This lack of action resulted in massive protests by Australian citizens remembering the heroic actions of the Timorese during World War II.

Reasons given by Indonesia for the invasion included the potential for a communist government, the need to develop the territory, national and regional security risks. Public statements denied that the invasion was aimed at taking the territory, and noted continued support for self-determination. Nominal elections were held under Indonesian coercion, and on 17 December Indonesia declared that an East Timorese Provisional Government would be formed that included representatives from Apodeti, UDT, KOTA, and the Labour Party.

Attempts by the United Nations Secretary General's Special Representative, Vittorio Winspeare-Guicciardi to visit Fretilin-held areas from Darwin, Australia, were obstructed by the Indonesian military, which blockaded East Timor. On 31 May 1976, the government selected 37 individuals to form a 'People's Assembly' in Dili. This assembly unanimously endorsed integration into Indonesia, cementing an Indonesian narrative of union with Indonesia as an act of self-determination. On 17 July, East Timor officially became the 27th province of the Republic of Indonesia (Timor Timur). The provisional government made appeals to the UN to have this integration recognised as a legitimate act of self-determination.

Nonetheless, the occupation of East Timor remained a public issue in many nations, Portugal in particular, and the UN never recognised either the regime installed by the Indonesians or the subsequent annexation. We can refer to the resolution approved by the United nations General Assembly on 12 December 1975, saying "having heard the statements of the representatives of Portugal, as the Administering Power, concerning developments in Portuguese Timor...deplores the military intervention of the armed forces of Indonesia in Portuguese Timor and calls upon the Government of Indonesia to withdraw without delay its armed forces from the Territory...and recommends that the Security Council take urgent action to protect the territorial integrity of Portuguese Timor and the inalienable right of its people to self-determination". From 1975 to 1982, the General Assembly asserted each year the right of East Timor to self-determination. Portugal remained the recognised administering authority, and Indonesian forces were called to withdraw. José Ramos-Horta represented FRETILIN at the UN, where he campaigned for independence.

Despite this international opposition, few actions were taken to support independence. Many states tacitly accepted Indonesian control. Australia went as far as to officially recognise the annexation, and downplay the death of five Australian journalists during the invasion. Such actions were caused by attempts to remain on good terms with Indonesia, especially in the context of the Cold War. Despite an expressed aversion to the use of military force, the Indonesian invasion was not seriously opposed. Indeed, there was implicit support. The United States held joint military drills with Indonesia prior to the invasion, and at the time of the invasion around 90% of Indonesia's arms originated from the United States. Military support continued, and even increased, after the invasion. There was also little support among other countries in ASEAN for East Timorese independence, with a similar fear of communism, as well as fear of regional instability. Malaysia provided strong support in international forums, despite previous conflicts with Indonesia, as it sought to repress its own independence movement and leave open the option of incorporating Brunei. The Philippines and Thailand also voted with Indonesia in the UN, with the Philippines also fighting separatists at the time. Singapore was less initially supportive, but later sought to have the situation accepted fait accompli. Portugal, while not providing strong opposition leading up to the invasion, later led international support for self-determination.

Resistance shifted to the interior, where FRETILIN continued to hold territory (knows as the zonas libertadas). In 1976 administration of these areas was divided into six sectors, each with civilian and military leadership. These sectors covered the traditional regions (concelhos) of Portuguese rule, and were similarly divided into posts (postos), sucos, and aldeias. The sucos level was removed in 1977. Continuing Indonesian campaigning led to the slow capture of these territories, which this conquest being completed in 1978. Indonesia adopted the existing suco system to manage its administration, while resistance to Indonesian rules was also organised on suco lines.

In an effort to stamp greater control over its dissident new province – whose seizure was condemned by the United Nations – Indonesia invested considerable sums in Timor-Leste leading to more rapid economic growth which averaged 6% per year over the period 1983–1997. Unlike the Portuguese, the Indonesians favoured strong, direct rule, which was never accepted by the Timorese people, who were determined to preserve their culture and national identity. By 1976 there were 35,000 Indonesian troops in East Timor. Falintil, the military wing of Fretilin, fought a guerrilla war with marked success in the first few years but weakened considerably thereafter. The cost of the brutal takeover to the East Timorese was huge; it's estimated that at least 100,000 died in the hostilities, and ensuing disease and famine. Other reported death tolls from the 24-year occupation range from 60,000 to 200,000. A detailed statistical report prepared for the Commission for Reception, Truth and Reconciliation in East Timor cited a lower range of 102,800 conflict-related deaths in the period 1974–1999, namely, approximately 18,600 killings and 84,200 'excess' deaths from hunger and illness. There were also reports of rapes, burning and sacking of buildings. By February 1976, with troops spreading out from the capital to occupy villages to the east and south, East Timor's Indonesian-appointed deputy governor, Lopez la Cruz, admitted that 60,000 East Timorese had been killed. Troop numbers were increased and draconian controls were imposed on the population, isolating the territory from the outside world.

By 1989, Indonesia had things firmly under control and opened East Timor to tourism. Then, on 12 November 1991 Indonesian troops fired on protesters gathered at the Santa Cruz Cemetery in Dili to commemorate the killing of an independence activist. With the event captured on film and aired around the world, the embarrassed Indonesian government admitted to 19 killings, although it's estimated that over 200 died in the massacre.

While Indonesia introduced a civilian administration, the military remained in control. Aided by secret police and civilian Timorese militia to crush dissent, reports of arrest, torture, and murder were numerous.

== Towards independence ==
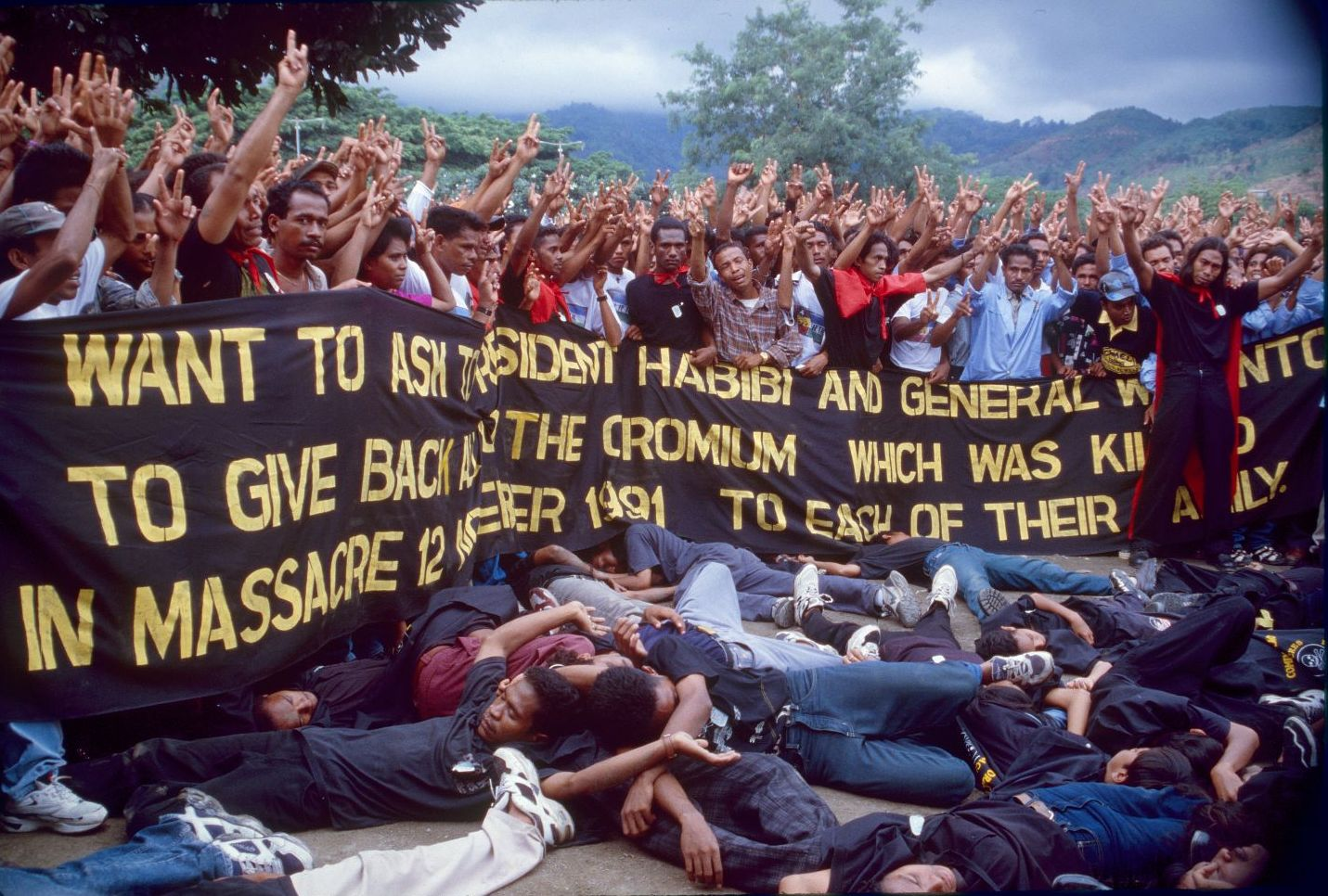
A re-enactment of the Santa Cruz Dili massacre, November 1998

Timorese groups fought a campaign of resistance against Indonesian forces for the independence of East Timor, during which many atrocities and human rights violations by the Indonesian army were reported, which Indonesian President Susilo Bambang Yudhoyono accepted in 2008 that Indonesia had been guilty of. Foreign powers such as the Australian government, concerned to maintain good relations with Indonesia, had been consistently reluctant to assist a push for independence (despite popular sympathy for the East Timorese cause among many in the Australian electorate). However, the departure of President Suharto and a shift in Australian policy by the Howard government in 1998 precipitated a proposal for a referendum on the question of independence. Ongoing lobbying by the Portuguese government also provided impetus.

=== Effects of the Dili Massacre ===
The Dili Massacre on 12 November 1991 was a turning point for sympathy for pro-independence East Timorese. A burgeoning East Timor solidarity movement grew in Portugal, Australia, and the United States. After the massacre, the US Congress voted to cut off funding for IMET training of Indonesian military personnel. However, arms sales continued from the US to the Indonesian National Armed Forces. President Bill Clinton cut off all US military ties with the Indonesian military in 1999. The Australian government promoted a strong connection with the Indonesian military at the time of the massacre, but also cut off ties in 1999.

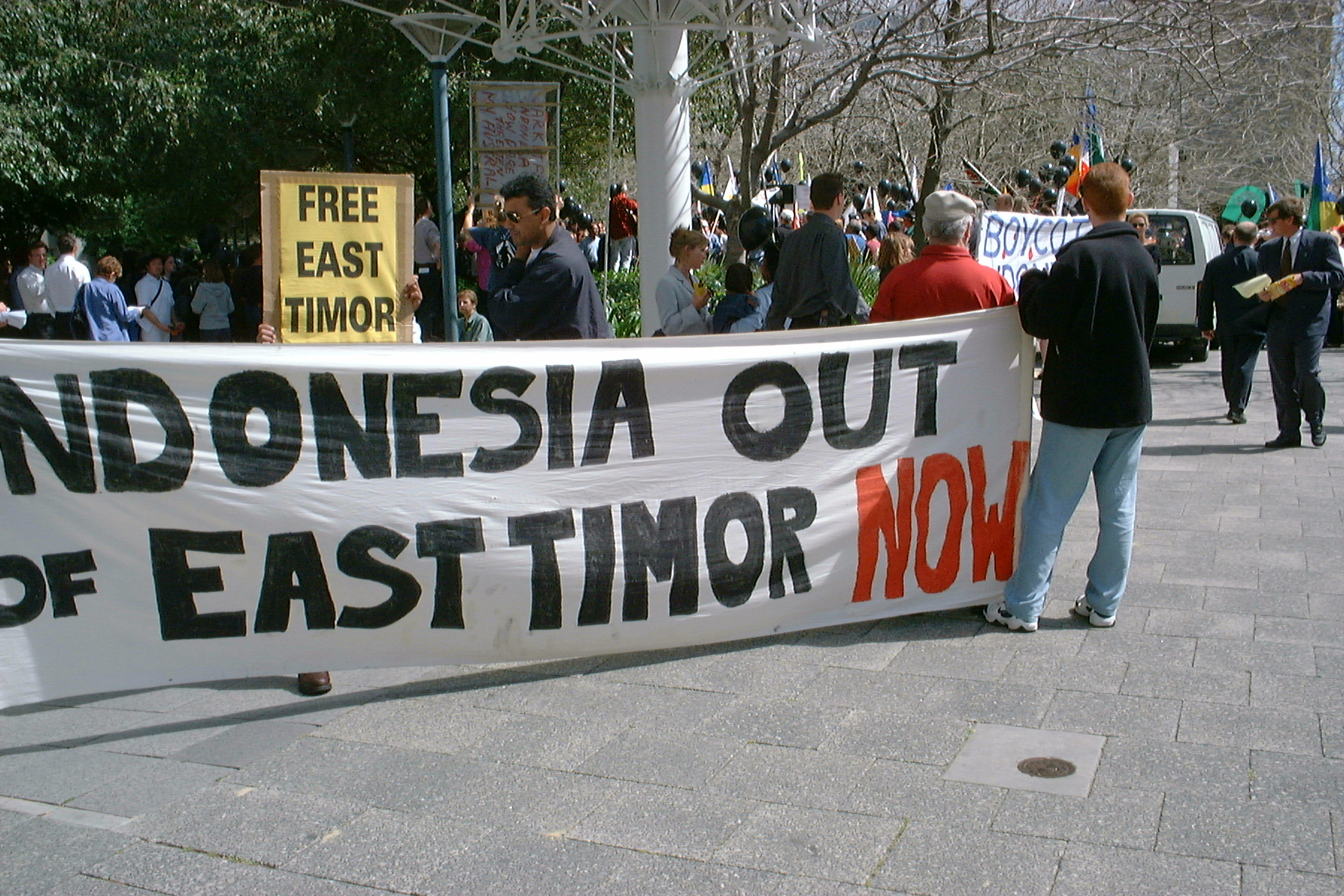
Demonstration against Indonesian occupation of East Timor, Perth, Australia, 10 September 1999.

The Massacre had a profound effect on public opinion in Portugal, especially after television footage showing East Timorese praying in Portuguese, and independence leader Xanana Gusmão gained widespread respect, being awarded the Portugal's highest honour in 1993, after he had been captured and imprisoned by the Indonesians.

Australia's troubled relationship with the Suharto regime was brought into focus by the Massacre. In Australia, there was also widespread public outrage, and criticism of Canberra's close relationship with the Suharto regime and recognition of Jakarta's sovereignty over East Timor. This caused the Australian government embarrassment, but Foreign Minister Gareth Evans played down the killings, describing them as "an aberration, not an act of state policy". Prime Minister Paul Keating's (1991–1996) first overseas trip was to Indonesia in April 1992 and sought to improve trade and cultural relations, but repression of the East Timorese continued to mar co-operation between the two nations.

Gareth Evans and Keatings gave maintenance of close relations with the Indonesian government a high priority, as did the subsequent prime minister John Howard and foreign minister Alexander Downer during their first term in office (1996–1998). Australian governments saw good relations and stability in Indonesia (Australia's largest neighbour) as providing an important security buffer to Australia's north. Nevertheless, Australia provided important sanctuary to East Timorese independence advocates like José Ramos-Horta (who based himself in Australia during his exile).

The fall of President Suharto and the arrival of President B. J. Habibie in 1998 and the rise of Indonesian democracy brought a new prospect for a potential change in the dynamic between the Australian and Indonesian governments.

=== Role of the Catholic Church ===
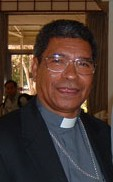
Bishop Carlos Belo, winner of the 1996 Nobel Peace Prize.

The Catholic Church in East Timor played an important role in society throughout the Indonesian occupation. While just 20% of East Timorese called themselves Catholics in 1975, the figure surged to reach 95% by the end of the first decade after the invasion. During the occupation, Bishop Carlos Ximenes Belo became one of the most prominent advocates for human rights in East Timor and many priests and nuns risked their lives in defending citizens from military abuses. Pope John Paul II's 1989 visit to East Timor exposed the occupied territory's situation to world media and provided a catalyst for independence activists to seek global support. Officially neutral, the Vatican wished to retain good relations with Indonesia, the world's largest Muslim nation. Upon his arrival in East Timor, the Pope symbolically kissed a cross then pressed it to the ground, alluding to his usual practice of kissing the ground on arrival in a nation, and yet avoiding overtly suggesting East Timor was a sovereign country. He spoke fervently against abuses in his sermon, whilst avoiding naming the Indonesian authorities as responsible.

In 1996, Bishop Carlos Filipe Ximenes Belo and José Ramos-Horta, two leading East Timorese activists for peace and independence, received the Nobel Peace Prize for "their work towards a just and peaceful solution to the conflict in East Timor".

A number of priests and nuns were murdered in the violence in East Timor that followed the 1999 Independence referendum. The newly independent nation declared three days of national mourning upon the death of Pope John Paul II in 2005.

=== International lobbying ===
Portugal started to apply international pressure, raising the issue with its fellow European Union members as well as in wider forums such as the United Nations Commission on Human Rights and the International Court of Justice. However, other EU countries like the UK had close economic relations with Indonesia, including arms sales, and saw no advantage in forcefully raising the issue.

Appeals by those advocating for East Timorese independence were targeted at western citizens as well as governments, emphasising the vision of the new state as a liberal democracy.

In the mid-1990s, the pro-democracy People's Democratic Party (PRD) in Indonesia called for withdrawal from East Timor. The party's leadership was arrested in July 1996.

In July 1997, visiting South African President Nelson Mandela visited Suharto as well as the imprisoned Xanana Gusmão. He urged the freeing of all East Timorese leaders in a note reading, "We can never normalize the situation in East Timor unless all political leaders, including Mr. Gusmão, are freed. They are the ones who must bring about a solution." Indonesia's government refused but did announce that it would take three months off Gusmão's 20-year sentence.

In 1998, the reformasi movement in Indonesia led to the resignation of Suharto and his replacement by President Habibie, which brought political reform towards a more democratic system. In June 1998, facing increasing domestic and international pressure on the issue, Jakarta offered East Timor autonomy within the Indonesian state, although it ruled out independence, and stated that Portugal and the UN must recognise Indonesian sovereignty.

=== Referendum for independence, violence ===
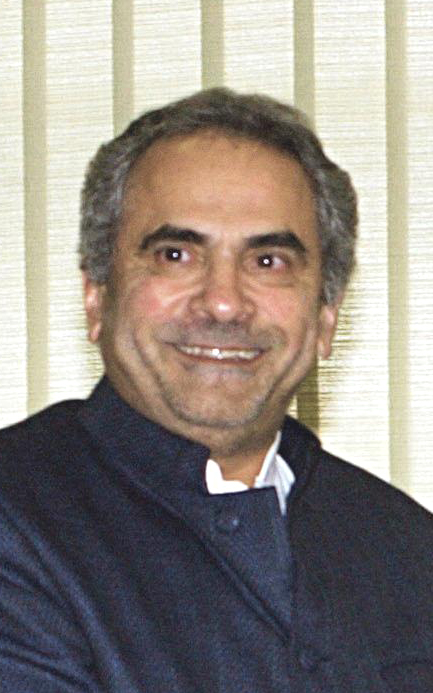
José Ramos-Horta, 1996 Nobel Peace Prize winner, former prime minister and current president of Timor-Leste.

New Indonesian President B. J. Habibie was prepared to consider a change of status for East Timor. Portugal had started to gain some political allies firstly in the EU, and after that in other places of the world to pressure Indonesia. In late 1998, the Australian Prime Minister John Howard with his Foreign Minister Alexander Downer drafted a letter setting out a major change in Australian policy. The letter supported the idea of autonomy but went much further by suggesting that the East Timorese be given a chance to vote on independence within a decade. The letter, which compared East Timor to New Caledonia, upset Habibie, who saw it as implying Indonesia was a "colonial power". He decided in response to announce a snap referendum to be conducted within six months. Other reasons for this change of attitude include shifting priorities, greater consideration of international image, and a belief that East Timor would vote for autonomy. In his announcement of the referendum, Habibie cited "norms of democracy and justice" as a reason to allow for self-determination.

News of the proposal provoked a violent reaction in East Timor from pro-Indonesian militia. The Indonesian army did not intervene to restore order. At a summit in Bali John Howard told Habibie that a United Nations Peace Keeping force should oversee the process. Habibie rejected the proposal, believing it would have insulted the Indonesian military.

The United Nations Mission in East Timor (UNAMET) was created to oversee the referendum in June 1999, six months after Habibie's January announcement. Intimidation from pro-Indonesian militia continued during this period, and the referendum was delayed twice. Eventually, the referendum was held on 30 August. It produced a clear majority (78.5%) in favour of independence, rejecting the alternative offer of being an autonomous region within Indonesia, to be known as the Special Autonomous Region of East Timor (SARET).

Before official results were announced, Indonesian military-supported East Timorese pro-integration militia and Indonesian soldiers began a campaign of violence and terrorism in retaliation, "Operation Clean Sweep". Between 1,500 and 3000 Timorese were killed, and in addition to internal displacement 300,000 were forcibly pushed into West Timor as refugees. The majority of the country's infrastructure, including homes, irrigation systems, water supply systems, and schools, and nearly 100% of the country's electrical grid were destroyed.

Activists in Portugal, Australia, the United States, and elsewhere pressured their governments to take action. The violence was met with widespread public anger in Australia. The Opposition Spokesman on Foreign Affairs, Labor's Laurie Brereton, was vocal in highlighting evidence of the Indonesian military's involvement in pro-integrationist violence and advocated United Nations peacekeeping to support East Timor's ballot. The Catholic Church in Australia urged the Australian Government to send an armed peacekeeping force to East Timor to end the violence. Street protesters harried the Indonesian Embassy.

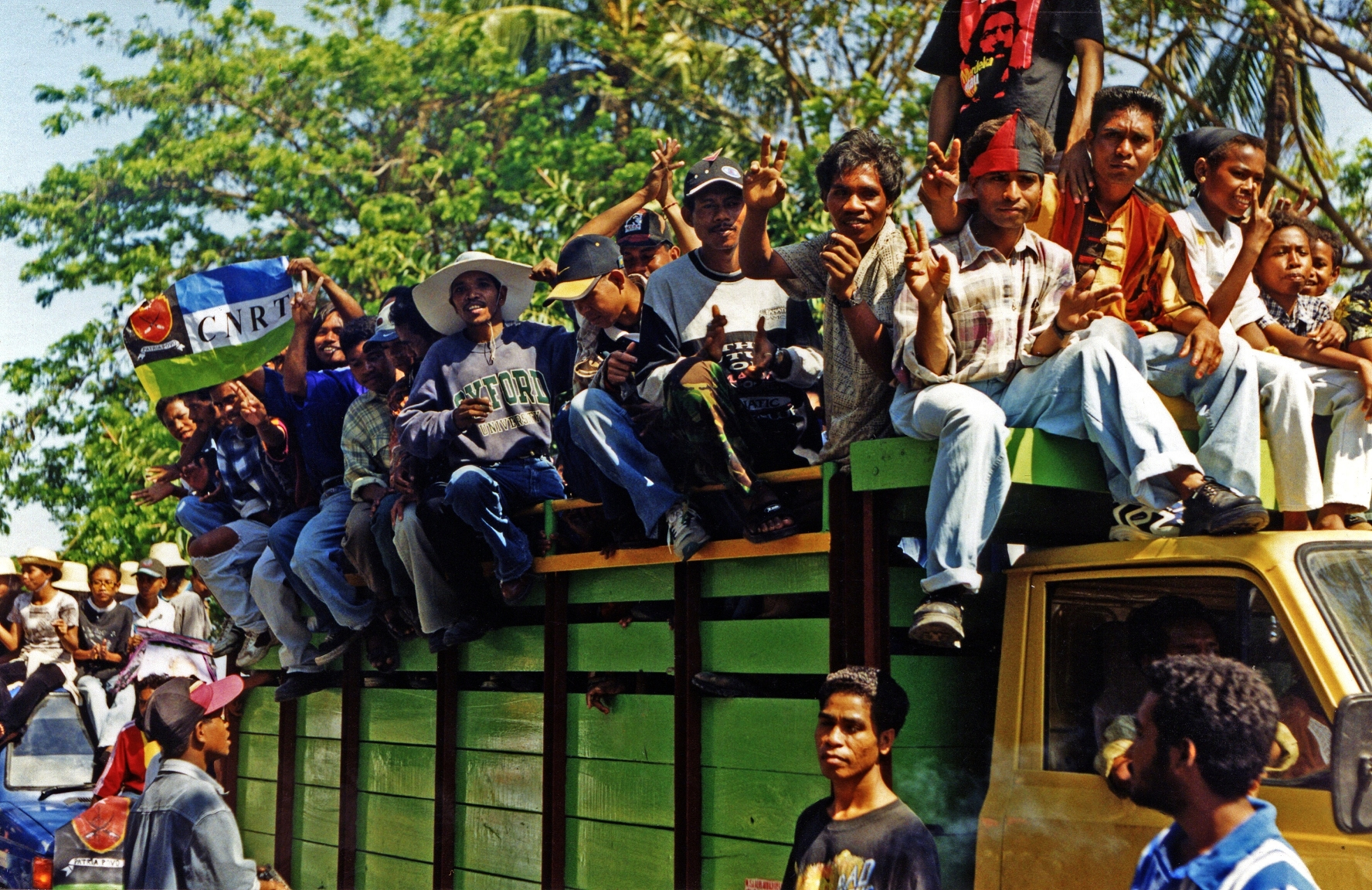
East Timorese independence referendum, 1999

John Howard conferred with United Nations Secretary General Kofi Annan and lobbied U. S. President Bill Clinton for an Australian led international peace keeper force to enter East Timor to end the violence. The United States offered crucial logistical and intelligence resources and an "over-horizon" deterrent presence. Finally, on 11 September, Bill Clinton announced:

I have made clear that my willingness to support future economic assistance from the international community will depend upon how Indonesia handles the situation from today.

Indonesia, in dire economic straits relented and on 12 September, Indonesian President Habibie announced:

A couple of minutes ago I called the United Nations Secretary General, Mr Kofi Annan, to inform about our readiness to accept international peacekeeping forces through the United Nations, from friendly nations, to restore peace and security in East Timor.

It was clear that the UN did not have sufficient resources to combat the paramilitary forces directly. Instead, on 15 September the UN authorised the creation of a multinational military force known as INTERFET (International Force for East Timor), with Security Council Resolution 1264. Troops were contributed by 17 nations, about 9,900 in total. 4,400 came from Australia, the remainder mostly from South-East Asia. The force was led by Australian Major-General (now General) Peter Cosgrove.

On 20 September 1999 INTERFET deployed to the country, and Indonesia withdrew both its military and its civilian administration.

== United Nations administration ==
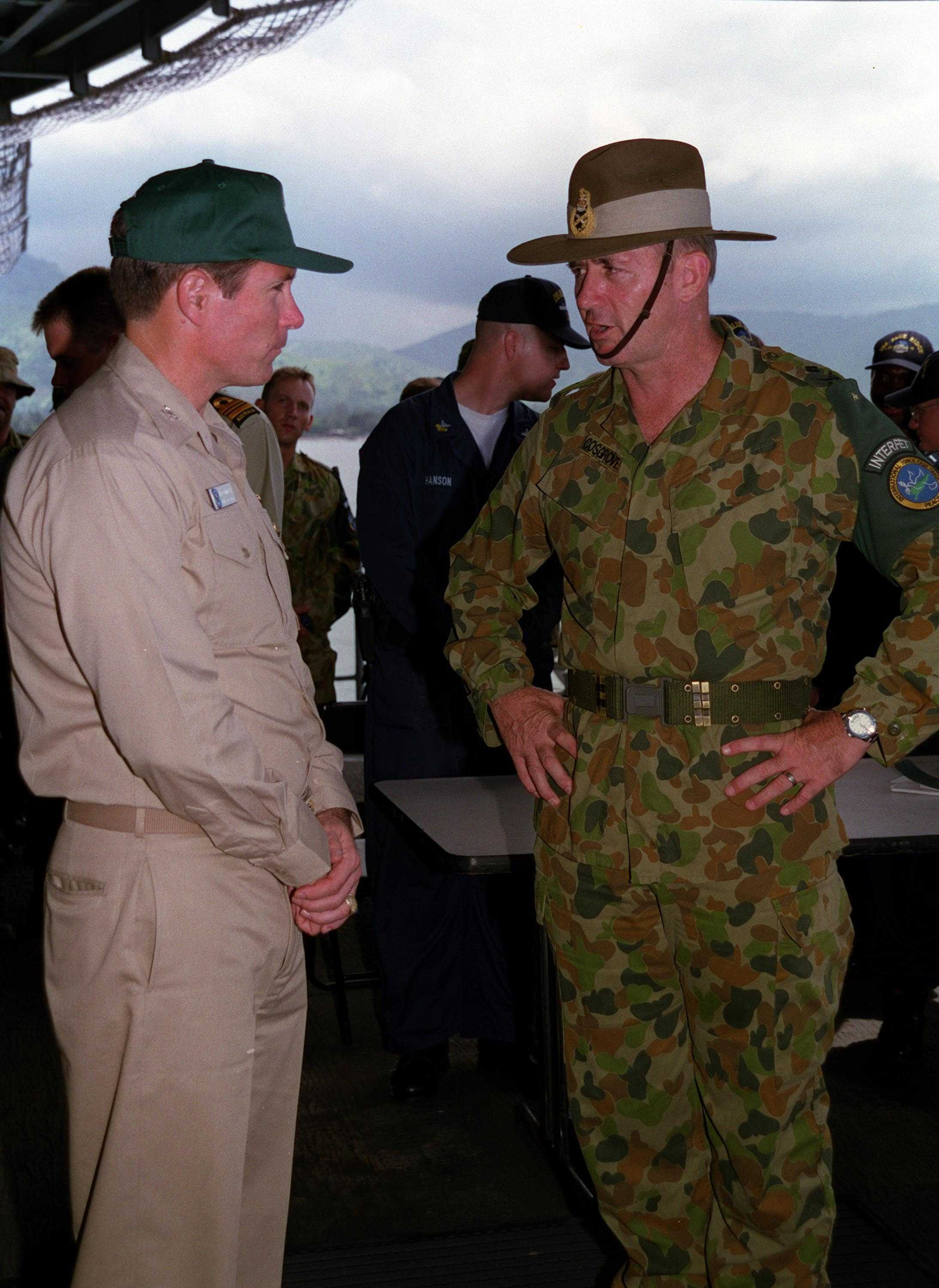
Major General Peter Cosgrove (right) Australian commander of the United Nations backed peace keeping operation (INTERFET) to East Timor.

On 15 October 1999, the Indonesian People's Consultative Assembly repealed the law annexing East Timor. The administration of East Timor was taken over by the UN through the United Nations Transitional Administration in East Timor (UNTAET), established on 25 October, and all remaining Indonesian forces left the territory in November. The INTERFET deployment ended on 14 February 2000 with the transfer of military command to the UN.

The scope of the UNTAET mission exceeded previous UN peacekeeping efforts. UNTAET exercised effective sovereignty during this period, and engaged in a state-building process to develop institutions and local capacity, in addition to handling immediate humanitarian and security needs. Tensions existed between the mandate of effective governance, and the mandate to quickly prepare the territory for democratic self-governance. Governance was strongly centralised, with less investment in local capacity. A rapid timetable and insufficient engagement with local authorities, including limited cooperation with the National Council of Maubere Resistance, further limited institutional development. Reconstruction efforts included rebuilding the education system. For this textbooks were bought in the new official language, Portuguese, despite many teachers and students being unable to speak it.

Elections were held in late 2001 for a constituent assembly to draft a constitution, a task finished in February 2002. Timor-Leste became formally independent on 20 May 2002. Xanana Gusmão was sworn in as the country's president. Timor-Leste became a member of the UN on 27 September 2002.

== The independent republic ==
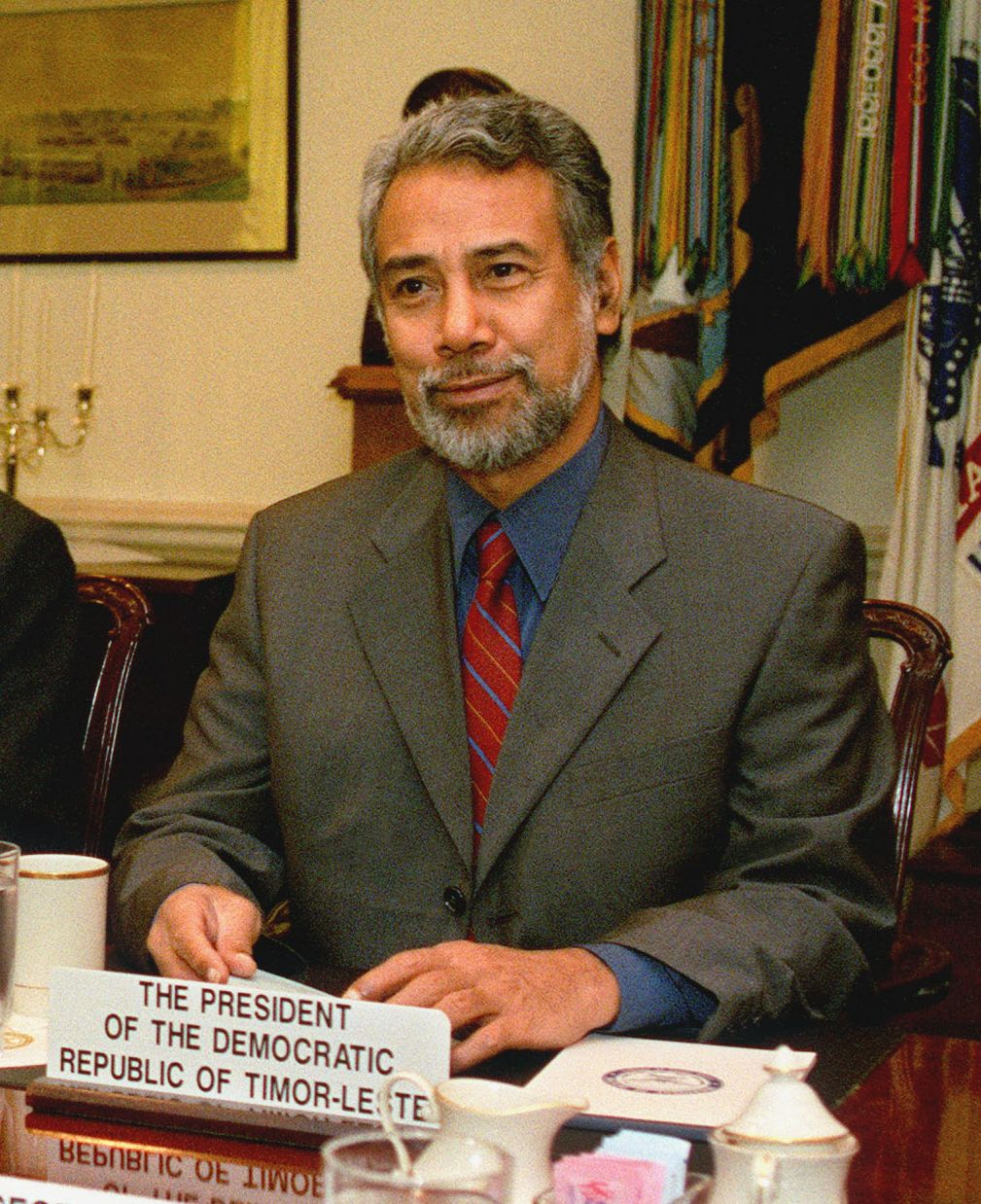
Xanana Gusmão, first president of Timor-Leste.

Destruction and violence not only destroyed the country's infrastructure and economy, but also drained its human capacity, leading to Ramos-Horta stating "we are starting from absolutely ground zero".

On 4 December 2002, after a student had been arrested the previous day, rioting students set fire to the house of the Prime Minister Marí Alkatiri and advanced on the police station. The police opened fire and one student was killed, whose body the students carried to the National Parliament building. There they fought the police, set a supermarket on fire and plundered shops. The police opened fire again and four more students were killed. Alkatiri called an inquiry and blamed foreign influence for the violence.

Following independence, all land that had been used by both the Portuguese and Indonesian administrations was declared state land.

The early economy was dependent on foreign funding. In 2004, three-quarters of those earning wages worked for the civil service, the UN, or NGOs. The small private sector was mostly security services.

Administrative borders in this period reverted again to the original Administrative post system, although much of the direct governance took place on the suco level, where administrative data was obtained and elections were held. 442 sukus and 2228 aldeias were formally designated in 2004, in preparation for the elections of suco chiefs in 2005.

Relations with Indonesia have been cordial. The two countries have defined most of their borders. In 2005, the Commission for Reception, Truth and Reconciliation in East Timor reported on human rights violations in period of Indonesian rule and the year before and offered the first national history of Timor-Leste driven by Timorese oral histories. In 2008, the Indonesia–Timor Leste Commission of Truth and Friendship confirmed most of the earlier Commission's findings.

Australia–Timor-Leste relations have been strained by disputes over the maritime boundary between the two countries. Canberra claims petroleum and natural gas fields in an area known as the 'Timor Gap', which Timor-Leste regards as lying within its maritime boundaries. Articles relating to this topic include:

- Timor Sea Treaty
- Australia-Timor-Leste spying scandal
- Treaty on Certain Maritime Arrangements in the Timor Sea

=== 2006 crisis ===
Unrest started in the country in April 2006 following riots in Dili. A rally in support of 600 East Timorese soldiers, who were dismissed for deserting their barracks, turned into rioting where five people were killed and over 20,000 fled their homes. Fierce fighting between pro-government troops and disaffected Falintil troops broke out in May 2006. While unclear, the motives behind the fighting appeared to be the distribution of oil funds and the poor organisation of the Timorese army and police, which included former Indonesian-trained police and former Timorese rebels. Prime Minister Mari Alkatiri called the violence a "coup" and welcomed offers of foreign military assistance from several nations. As of 25 May 2006, Australia, Portugal, New Zealand, and Malaysia sent troops to Timor, attempting to quell the violence. At least 23 deaths occurred as a result of the violence.

On 21 June 2006, President Xanana Gusmão formally requested Prime Minister Mari Alkatiri step down. A majority of Fretilin party members demanded the prime minister's resignation, accusing him of lying about distributing weapons to civilians. On 26 June 2006 Prime Minister Mari Alkatiri resigned stating, "I declare I am ready to resign my position as prime minister of the government... so as to avoid the resignation of His Excellency the President of the Republic". In August, rebel leader Alfredo Reinado escaped from Becora Prison, in Dili. Tensions were later raised after armed clashes between youth gangs forced the closure of Presidente Nicolau Lobato International Airport in late October.

In April 2007, Gusmão declined another presidential term. In the build-up to the April 2007 presidential elections there were renewed outbreaks of violence in February and March 2007. José Ramos-Horta was inaugurated as president on 20 May 2007, following his election win in the second round. Gusmão was sworn in as prime minister on 8 August 2007. President Ramos-Horta was critically injured in an assassination attempt on 11 February 2008, in a failed coup apparently perpetrated by Alfredo Reinado, a renegade soldier who died in the attack. Prime Minister Gusmão also faced gunfire separately but escaped unharmed. The Australian government immediately sent reinforcements to Timor-Leste to keep order.

A 2009 law (Law No 3/2009) set out the legal responsibilities of suco administrators, assigning the formal responsibility of relaying government initiatives, and of mediating within their community. This formal power did not override traditional customary practices, with traditional leaders retaining acknowledged informal influence.

=== From 2010s ===
New Zealand announced in early November 2012, it would be pulling its troops out of the country, saying the country was now stable and calm. Five New Zealand troops were killed in the 13 years the country had a military presence in Timor-Leste.

Francisco Guterres of centre-left Fretilin party was the president of Timor-Leste since May 2017 until 19 May 2022. The main party of AMP coalition, National Congress for Timorese Reconstruction, led by independence hero Xanana Gusmão, was in power from 2007 to 2017, but leader of Fretilin Mari Alkatiri formed a coalition government after July 2017 parliamentary election. However, the new minority government soon fell, meaning second general election in May 2018. In June 2018, former president and independence fighter Jose Maria de Vasconcelos known as Taur Matan Ruak of three-party coalition, Alliance of Change for Progress (AMP), became the new prime minister.

The Nobel prize winner, former president José Ramos-Horta won the April 2022 presidential election runoff against the incumbent president, Francisco Guterres . In May 2022, Ramos-Horta was sworn in as Timor-Leste president. On 26 October 2025, Timor-Leste became the 11th member state of ASEAN with the signing of the Declaration on the Admission of Timor-Leste into ASEAN. The 2026 ASEAN summit held in the Philippines, East Timor's Catholic ally, was the first ASEAN summit wherein East Timor participated as a full member of ASEAN. This occurred simultaneously with the chairmanship of António Guterres who is the reigning Secretary-General of the United Nations and is of Portuguese and East Timorese ancestry.

=== United Nations missions ===
- UNAMET United Nations Mission in East Timor: June—October 1999
- UNTAET United Nations Transitional Administration in East Timor: October 1999 – May 2002
- UNMISET United Nations Mission of Support to East Timor: May 2002 – May 2005
- UNOTIL United Nations Office in Timor Leste: May 2005 – August 2006
- UNMIT United Nations Integrated Mission in Timor-Leste: August 2006 – December 2012

== See also ==
- Timeline of East Timorese history
- List of years in East Timor
- List of rulers of Timor
- History of Asia
- History of Southeast Asia
- History of Indonesia
- Politics of Timor-Leste
