= Timeline of East Timorese history =

This is a timeline of East Timorese history, comprising important legal and territorial changes and political events in Timor-Leste and its predecessor states. To read about the background to these events, see History of Timor-Leste.

== 16th century ==
Year	Date	Event
1556		A group of Dominican friars established the village of Lifau.
1600		Portugal opened a trade route with East Timor.

== 18th century ==
Year	Date	Event
1702		The territory officially became a Portuguese colony, taking the name Portuguese Timor.
1769		The capital was moved to Dili.

== 19th century ==
Year	Date	Event
1859		The border between Portuguese Timor and the Dutch East Indies was formally decided.

== 20th century ==
Year	Date	Event
1910		Beginning of the Great Rebellion
1912		The rebellion was quashed with Portuguese troops from its colonies in Mozambique and Macau, resulting in the deaths of three thousand people.
1913		The Portuguese and Dutch agreed to a formal division of the island.
1916		A definitive border between Portuguese and Dutch territories was drawn in the Hague.
1941		Portuguese Timor was occupied by Australian and Dutch forces.
1974		Carnation Revolution: A revolution installed a new government.
1975		Indonesian invasion of East Timor: Indonesia invaded East Timor.
1976		Indonesian occupation of East Timor: Indonesia declared East Timor its 27th province.
1991		Santa Cruz massacre: Pro-independence demonstrators in the Santa Cruz cemetery are shot.
1996		The Nobel Peace Prize was awarded to Carlos Filipe Ximenes Belo and José Ramos-Horta for their ongoing efforts to peacefully end the occupation.
1999		East Timor Special Autonomy Referendum: A referendum resulted in 78% in favour of independence from Indonesia.
1999		The International Force for East Timor (INTERFET) arrived to address an ongoing humanitarian and security crisis.
1999		East Timor under United Nations administration (UNTAET).

== 21st century ==
Year	Date	Event
2002		Timor-Leste became an independent nation.
2005		Timor-Leste joined the ASEAN Regional Forum, as a part of the country's bid for accession to ASEAN as a whole.
2006		2006 East Timorese crisis: A national crisis that included a coup attempt swept the nation.
