= Culture of Timor-Leste =

The culture of Timor-Leste reflects numerous cultural influences, including Portuguese, Roman Catholic, and Malay, on the indigenous Austronesian cultures in Timor-Leste.

== UNESCO activities ==
Timor-Leste become a state party to the UNESCO World Heritage Convention on 31 January 2017. It has yet to nominate possible inscriptions in any UNESCO networks such as UNESCO Intangible Cultural Heritage Lists, World Heritage List, World Network of Biosphere Reserves, Creative Cities Network, and Global Geoparks Network. Major contenders for the country includes Atauro Island, which Conservation International has cited as having the most biodiverse waters in the world, Cultural Landscape of the Fataluku, and Historic Monuments of Dili.

== Architecture ==
East Timorese architecture and landscaping is a combination of both Portuguese and indigenous Timorese. Many heritage districts, heritage towns, and heritage structures have been retained in Timor-Leste, unlike its Southeast Asian neighbors whose architectural styles have been replaced by modern and shanty structures that have destroyed cultural domains. Timor-Leste does not yet have a policy to conserve its architecture and landscapes, but is still one of the few nations in Asia to possess well-preserved indigenous architecture and colonial architecture. A proposal is also being made by some locals for the establishment of a law which mandates all villages to have a single architectural and landscaping style to preserve their village/town aesthetics and culture.

== Literature ==
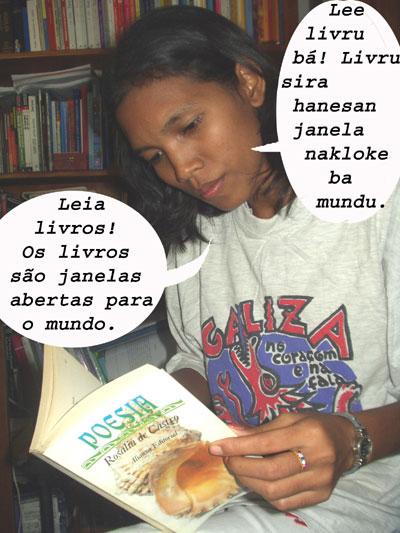
Campaigning for reading in Timor-Leste.

Easily the most famous East Timorese author is Xanana Gusmão, the leader of the Timorese resistance organization Fretilin, and former Prime Minister of independent East Timor. He wrote two books during the struggle for independence. Also a poet and painter, he produced works describing the culture, values, and skills of the Timorese people.

Other important writers of Timor include: Luís Cardoso, Fernando Sylvan, Ponte Pedrinha, Jorge Barros Duarte, Crisódio Araujo, Jorge Lauten, Francisco Borja da Costa, Afonso Busa Metan and Fitun Fuik.

== Religion ==
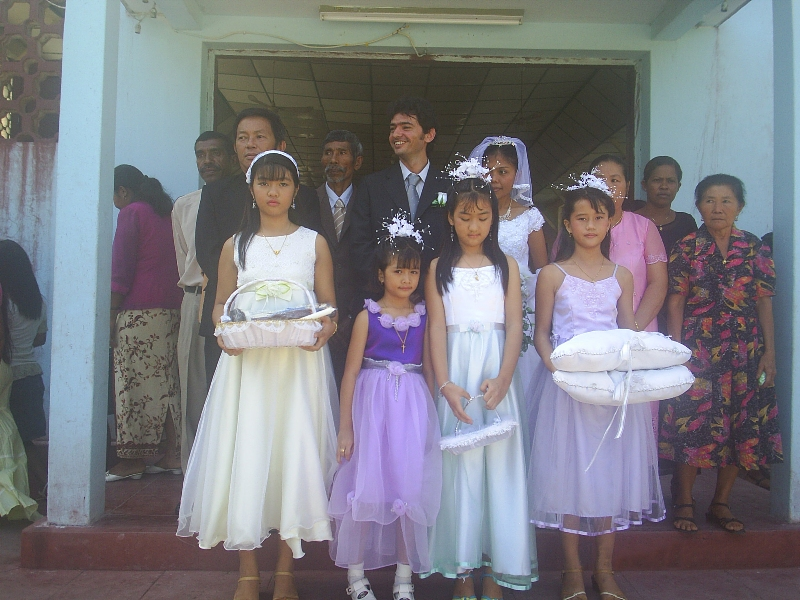
An East Timorese wedding in 2006

Timor-Leste has been nominally Catholic since early in the Portuguese colonial period. The Catholic faith became a central part of East Timorese culture during the Indonesian occupation between 1975 and 1999. While under Portuguese rule, the East Timorese had mostly been animist, sometimes integrated with minimal Catholic ritual, the number of Catholics dramatically increased under Indonesian rule. This was for several reasons: Indonesia was predominantly Muslim; the Indonesian state required adherence to one of six officially recognised religions and recognise traditional beliefs; and because the Catholic Church, which remained directly responsible to the Vatican throughout Indonesian rule, became a refuge for East Timorese seeking sanctuary from persecution.

The 'Apostolic Administrator' (de facto Bishop) of the Diocese of Dili, Monsignor Martinho da Costa Lopes, began speaking out against human rights abuses by the Indonesian security forces, including rape, torture, murder, and disappearances. Following pressure from Jakarta, he stepped down in 1983 and was replaced by the younger priest, Monsignor Carlos Filipe Ximenes Belo, who Indonesia thought would be more loyal. However, he too began speaking out, not only against human rights abuses, but the issue of self-determination, writing an open letter to the Secretary General of the United Nations, calling for a referendum. In 1996 he was awarded the Nobel Peace Prize, along with exiled leader José Ramos-Horta, now the country's President.

However, in spite of the majority of the country's people now being Catholics, there is freedom of religion in the new secular republic, and the former prime minister Marí Alkatiri, is a Muslim of Yemeni descent.

== Sports ==
Timor-Leste has joined many international sport associations, including the International Olympic Committee (IOC). The IOC board has granted full recognition to the East Timorese Olympic Committee (COTL). The IOC had allowed a mainly symbolic four-member team to take part in the 2000 Sydney Games under the Olympic flag as "Independent Olympic Athletes." The Federação de Timor-Leste de Atletismo has joined the International Association of Athletics Federations (IAAF). The Federação de Badminton de Timor-Leste joined the International Badminton Federation (IBF) in April 2003. The East Timor Cycling Federation has joined the Union Cycliste Internationale. The Confederação do Desporto de Timor Leste has joined the International Weightlifting Federation. Timor-Leste is also a full member of the International Table Tennis Federation (ITTF).

Timor-Leste has taken part in several sporting events. Although the athletes came back with no medals, East Timorese athletes had the opportunity to compete with other Southeast Asian athletes in the 2003 Southeast Asian Games held in Vietnam in 2003. In the 2003 ASEAN Paralympics Games, also held in Vietnam, Timor-Leste won a bronze medal. In the Athens 2004 Olympic Games, six athletes participated in three sports: athletics, weightlifting and boxing. Timor-Leste won three medals in Arnis at the 2005 Southeast Asian Games. Timor-Leste was also one of the competing nations in the first Lusophony Games, winning a bronze medal in the women's volleyball competition (finishing third out of three teams), despite the fact the team had lost all its three games. On October 30, 2008, Timor-Leste earned their first international points in a FIFA match with a 2–2 draw against Cambodia.

== Horse racing ==
Horse Racing is a popular sport in Timor Leste. Although less than 14 hands high, the Timor pony is used. It is renowned for its agility and strength. Regional race meets are held throughout Timor-Leste.

== Film ==
An extensive collection of Timorese audiovisual material is held at the National Film and Sound Archive of Australia. These holdings have been identified in a document titled The NFSA Timor-Leste Collection Profile, which features catalogue entries and essays for a total of 795 NFSA-held moving image, recorded sound and documentation works that have captured the history and culture of Timor-Leste since the early 20th century. The NFSA is working with the Timor-Leste government to ensure that all of this material can be used and accessed by the people of that country.

The extensive audiovisual material in the Max Stahl archive on the independence of Timor-Leste have been inscribed in UNESCO's Memory of the World Register in 2013 as "Birth of a nation: turning points."

== Cuisine ==
The cuisine of Timor-Leste consists of regional popular foods such as pork, fish, basil, tamarind, legumes, corn, rice, root vegetables, and tropical fruit. East Timorese cuisine has influences from Southeast Asian foods and from Portuguese dishes from its colonisation by Portugal. Flavours and ingredients from other former Portuguese colonies can be found due to the presence of Portuguese soldiers from other colonies in Timor-Leste.

== Public holidays ==
Timor-Leste now has public holidays that commemorate historic events in the liberation struggle, as well as those associated with Catholicism and Islam. They are defined in the Timor-Leste Law no. 10/2005.

Date (Gregorian calendar)	Date (Islamic calendar)	Name	Notes
1 January		New Year's Day	Celebrates beginning of the Gregorian year. Festivities include counting down to midnight at 00:00 on the preceding night of the New Year's Eve with fireworks display and party.
3 March		Veterans Day	
	1 Syawal	Idul Fitri	Date varies according to the Islamic calendar. Celebrates the end of the fasting month of Ramadan.
March–April		Good Friday	This is the Friday before Easter Sunday, which is the first Sunday after the first Paschal Full Moon following the official vernal equinox. This Christian holiday commemorates the crucifixion, death and resurrection of Jesus Christ.
1 May		Labour Day	Celebrates the economic and social achievements of workers.
20 May		Independence Restoration Day	Independence from the Republic of Indonesia in 2002.
	10 Dzulhijah	Idul Adha	Date varies according to the Islamic calendar. The holiday commemorates the willingness of Ibrahim to sacrifice his son Ismael as an act of obedience to Allah.
May–June		Corpus Christi	
30 August		Popular Consultation Day	Anniversary of the Popular Consultation in 1999.
1 November		All Saints' Day	
2 November		All Souls' Day	
3 November		National Women's Day	
12 November		National Youth Day	Anniversary of the Santa Cruz massacre in 1991.
28 November		Proclamation of Independence Day	Independence from the Republic of Portugal in 1975.
7 December		Memorial Day	
8 December		Immaculate Conception	
25 December		Christmas Day	This Christian holiday celebrates the birth of Jesus Christ.
31 December		National Heroes Day	

== See also ==
- List of museums in Timor-Leste
- Tais
- Timorese wedding traditions
- Tuku-Osan
