= Timorese wedding traditions =

Wedding traditions on the island of Timor

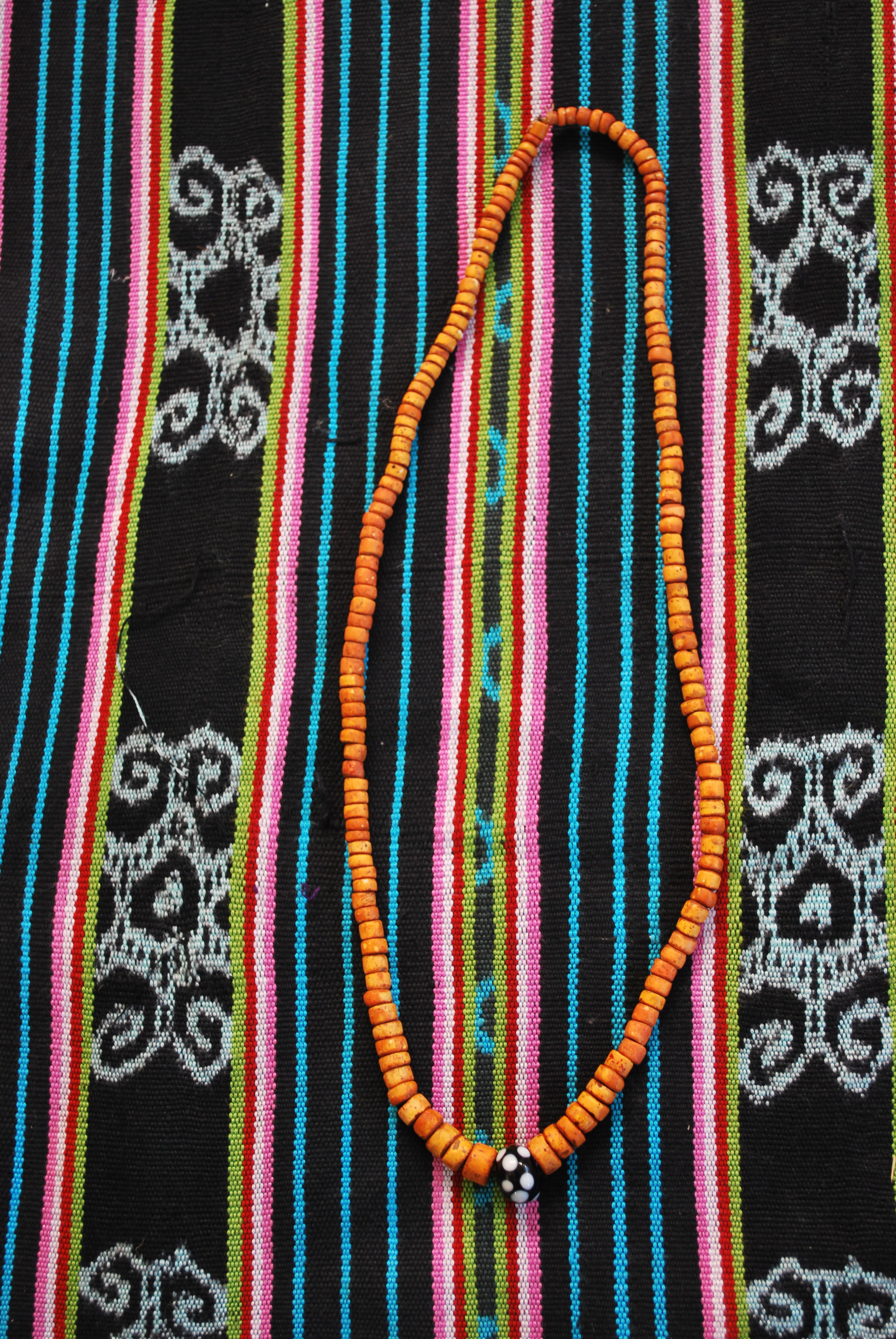
Mutissala beads and tais cloth (here from Viqueque) are typical components of a barlake

Timorese wedding traditions (Indonesian: Berlaki, Portuguese: Barlaque, Tetum: Barlake) apply to marriages on the island of Timor, which is divided between Indonesia and Timor-Leste. The wedding traditions are still followed in about half of all marriages in Timor-Leste. Ever since colonial times, there has been heated debate about the value of these traditions and the role of women in them.

== Background ==
Although there are sometimes very big differences between the languages and cultural systems of the various ethnolinguistic groups on Timor (e.g. patriarchal and matriarchal systems), there are also many similarities in their cosmological ideas and social structures.

An example of such ideas is dualism, a belief that two fundamental concepts exist in opposition to each other, such as mane-feto (transl. male-female) or ema laran-ema liur (transl. local-foreign). According to that belief, the rai (transl. earthly) is dominated by the male, while the sacred world of rai laran (transl. inner world) belongs to the female, with the sacred, the Lulik, at its core. The woman runs the household and takes care of the children, while external affairs are the responsibility of the man. In principle, a woman has a high position in society, but it is precisely in the family that the man threatens to control her, especially if the couple was married young. Since Timor-Leste's independence in 2002, Timorese traditions such as these have gained influence in East Timorese politics and in society in general.

On Timor, the basis of a marriage is a contract between the families, so that the marriage is more an "alliance between two families". The terms of the alliance are negotiated by the uncles of the bride and groom.

The valuable gifts exchanged between the families as part of Timorese marriage rituals (in Tetum, also referred to as barlake) must be of equal symbolism and cultural significance, with objects belonging to the bride's family being considered symbolically superior, as she comes from the side believed to be the sacred source of life. The barlake given to the bride's family is a mark of respect. It gives value to the bride and establishes her status. Not paying a barlake is considered to be disrespect to the bride's parents. Valuables are rarely given in full on one occasion, but are gradually exchanged at certain ceremonies over the course of the marriage. This gives the bride's family some control over how their daughter and her children are treated. In addition to the exchange of gifts, there are also obligations in further ritual life and also in the death rites.

A Lian Nain has explained that barlake serves to create a strong society and relationships. Without the barlake traditions, Timorese would not be able to see the relationships between people. The traditions also protect both men and women from violence, as they are well known and everyone has an eye on compliance (Tetum: tau matan).

For those East Timorese who live outside the capital city, Dili, Timorese traditions define their identity and have a major impact on life in the villages and small towns.

== Rituals ==
Most wedding ceremonies in Timor begin with the tuku odamatan ritual (transl. knocking on the door), when the family representatives meet for the first time, and the groom's family asks permission for the marriage. The bride's family is referred to as manesan/umane (transl. wife-giver/life-giver), and that of the groom as fetosan (transl. wife-taker/life-taker). Then, secret negotiations begin within the extended families as to whether the union is acceptable, what barlake to offer, and what to demand of the other family. To ensure that a decision is made, eating is prohibited until the final decision has been made. There is then a first exchange of gifts, and the bride and groom ask for the blessing of the ancestors in the two Uma Lulik (transl. Holy Houses) of the families.

The form and value of the gifts exchanged and the negotiations depend heavily on the houses and clans to which the bride and groom belong and how they related to each other in the past. The position of the bride's Uma Lulik also plays a role, as does (quite pragmatically) what the extended family can muster. The more elite the family, the more complex and valuable the gifts exchanged. Marriage between first cousins (Tetum: tuananga), and thus between the brother's daughter and the son of the sister who married outside the clan, is particularly encouraged. Marriages between clans without this relationship, or even with other ethnic groups are common, but then require lengthy negotiations.

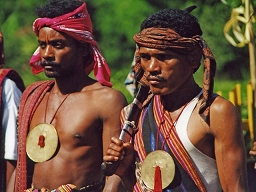
Two men wearing Belaks in Same, Manufahi in 2000

The exchange of gifts represents the migration of lives from one family to another. It is also seen as the termination of the woman's relationship with her ancestral Uma Lulik and the beginning of her relationship with her husband's Uma Lulik (although there are also ethnic groups in which the man traditionally moves to his wife's family, such as the matriarchal Bunak people). In the Manufahi municipality, the groom's family must present a golden belak (a round metal disc worn in front of the chest) to the Uma Lulik of the bride. This symbol of femininity is meant to replace the bride's body or spirit lost to her original Uma Lulik. Next, a gift known as the bee manas ai tukun (transl. hot water and firewood) is presented to the mother of the bride, alluding to her needs when giving birth. This gift is repayment for her pain and suffering at the birth of her daughter. Another gift goes to the mother's brother, in recognition of the mother's family. The main gift, however, goes to the family of the bride's father, which nowadays is often disparaged as a bride price.

From the groom's family come gifts associated with wealth creation, such as water buffalo, which pull ploughs in paddy fields. From the bridal side come items produced by women, such as the tais cotton fabrics typical of East Timor, or pigs, which are considered soft and feminine objects and are usually tended to by the women. There are also many other objects that also depend on the respective ethnic group, including jewellery such as mutissala beads, chains or old jewellery and coins made of gold or silver. The barlake is part of the obligation of the bride's new host family to protect her and the couple's children.

The gifts exchanged in the barlake ritual do not usually remain with one family, but travel, like in a chain, from one to the next related family, which at least theoretically guarantees a generally accepted level of value of the gifts exchanged.

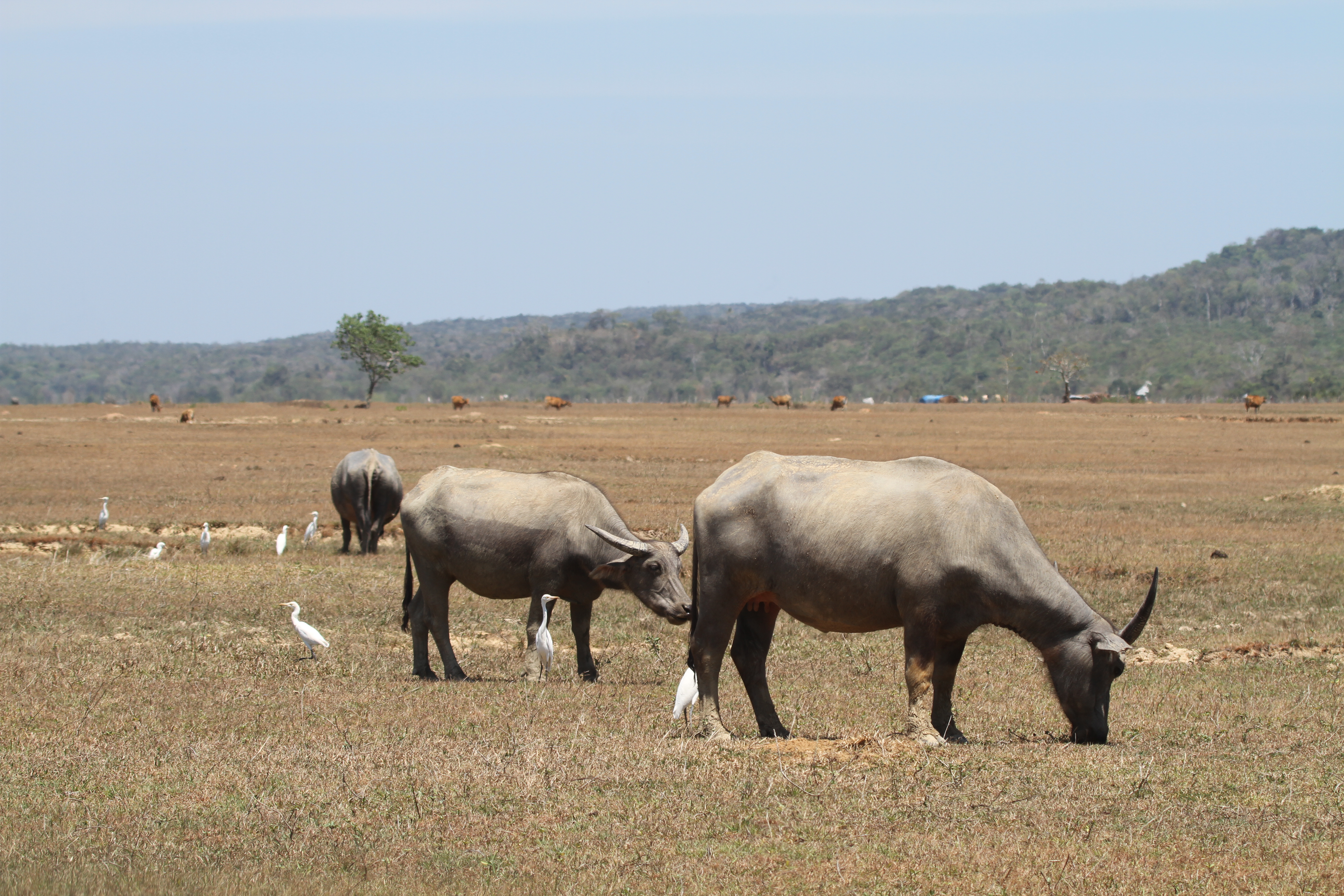
Water buffalo in Lautém

Timorese wedding traditions along the lines just described are still followed in about half of all marriages in Timor-Leste. There are certain differences between the barlake exchanged among Timor's different ethnolinguistic groups, but most parts of the ritual outlined above are common to all. Exceptions are some of the matriarchal communities that do not practise barlake, although these still have the "hot water and firewood" gift for the mother of the bride. In general, the bride's membership of a matriarchal or patriarchal group determines whether barlake occurs or not. If a groom's family cannot afford an adequate barlake, the groom moves in with his wife's family and stays at least until he has rendered adequate work in return. Traditionally, this meant working in the fields or helping around the house. Nowadays the work can consist of helping his wife's younger siblings with their education. The performance of such work leaves husbands vulnerable to exploitation and frustration. Some men who come from poor families do not marry at all and therefore do not have children, leaving them without recognition as full adults.

== Recent developments ==
Portuguese colonialism and the subsequent Indonesian occupation (1975–1999) weakened traditional culture in East Timor, but strengthened family ties and beliefs. A 1963 article reported that in order to impress or out of generosity, some families sacrificed too many buffaloes for wedding celebrations, with the result that later in the year they themselves lacked the animals for breeding or work. The Portuguese colonial administration put an end to this by limiting the number of animals that could be killed for celebrations.

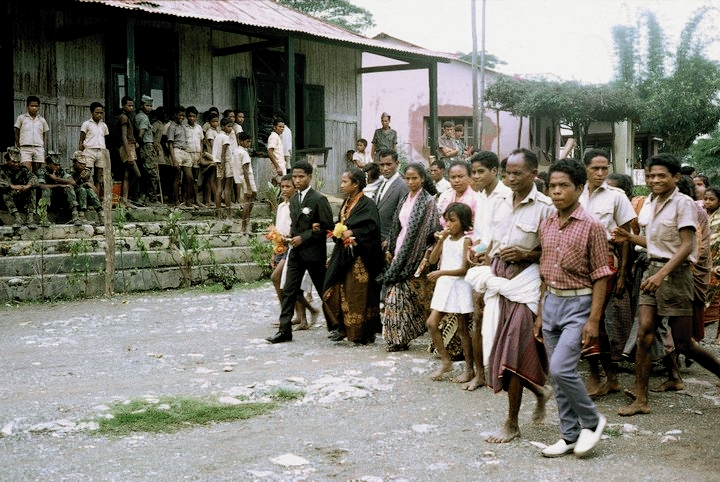
A wedding in Atsabe in 1968

Towards the end of the Portuguese colonial period, there was a violent dispute, the so-called "Barlake War" (Portuguese: Guerra do barlaque), which lasted from 1969 to September 1970, and then again from July to December 1973. The triggers of the dispute were the poem Mulher de Lipa, Feto Timor (1969) and the novella Mau Curo e Bere Mau ou o Grande Amor de Cai Buti (1973), both by the Portuguese-Timorese author Inácio de Moura, in which he concluded that barlake was making the bride a commodity. Timorese intellectuals responded that barlake was a far more complex social process that could not be limited to the exchange of goods.

On one side of the argument were Moura and Jaime Neves, native Portuguese who studied Timorese culture. They had come to Timor as military personnel. Opposing them were Abílio Araújo, Francisco Xavier do Amaral and Nicolau dos Reis Lobato. They were Timorese from leading families in different parts of the country, had received a Western Catholic education, and therefore had the status of assimilado. Although this categorisation had been officially abolished in 1961, it gave the men the weight they needed to debate on an equal footing with Portuguese officials. All three would later hold leading positions in Fretilin. In addition to Moura's publications, the barlake debate was subsequently picked up as a topic by the newspaper A Voz de Timor, the church magazine Seara and the military bulletin A Província de Timor. Neves was an editor at A Voz de Timor and a speaker at Emissora de Radio e Difusão de Timor, the local radio station. Luís Filipe Thomáz, the editor of A Província de Timor, was another Portuguese military man, who sided with the Timorese in the debate.

After the publication of Moura's poem, in which he spoke of a Timorese woman who would have to sell her love, Araújo sent a letter to the editor of A Província de Timor. Neves responded with several articles in A Voz de Timor, in which he practically declared the bride and groom slaves, whereupon Araújo countered with the article Onde está a verdade (transl. Where is the truth?) in A Província de Timor. Lobato and Amaral joined the debate. In 1973, the publication of Moura's short novella led to a heated argument between Moura, Neves and Thomáz in A Voz de Timor. Neves and Moura felt that the Timorese woman was not allowed to choose her own husband and that the "barbaric" system of barlake was due to the supposedly subservient position of women in Timorese society. Moura advertised his novella with the sentence "a Timorese story in which the author places the emphasis on the difficult but rushing victory of the love marriage over the complex background of barlake." Neves saw the way out for the actually kind-hearted Timorese as being the giving up of their faith and their rites and the acceptance of Christianity. According to him, Barlake had been a Neanderthal tradition and needed to be eliminated to bring people to a Christian and civilized culture. Thomáz dismissed that contention as an anachronism, and pointed out that the Neanderthals had not been Homo sapiens.

The Timorese objected that barlake was not disrespectful to the bride, nor was she forbidden the freedom to choose a mate. There would be no contradiction between barlake and a love match. In addition, the exchange of gifts would honour the bride and give her value and higher status. Brides were also important as the origin of life and due to their role in the community, which is not subordinate as in African societies. This would be clearly explained by the term feto maromak (transl. female god). Thomáz pointed out that there were restrictions on the bride only through arranged marriages to preserve family rank. Araújo emphasized the importance of the barlake in Timorese society as a link between families. He, Lobato and Amaral drew a complex picture of the Timorese society built on different principles, which their opponents could not understand from their European perspective. Thomáz eventually wrote to the Portuguese ethnologist Manuel Viegas Guerreiro for scholarly support. In his reply, Guerreiro quoted various anthropologists and concluded that "... the dowry is an instrument of marriage consolidation. It is not a commodity transaction."

In light of this controversy, it is puzzling that the first East Timorese government established by Fretilin in 1975 banned barlake and that the party outlawed it in its manifesto. The Popular Organisation of East Timorese Women (Portuguese: Organização Popular de Mulheres Timorense) (OPMT), the Fretilin women's organization, was founded by women like Rosa Bonaparte, who had got to know Maoism as students in Portugal and then, in their homeland, campaigned for equal rights for women, and fought against polygamy and barlake.

In that first East Timorese government, Araújo was appointed as Minister of Economy and Social Affairs and Amaral was the President, although the government survived only nine days until the Indonesians occupied the country. Fretilin's position only changed again during the period of resistance against Indonesia, as the support of traditional society was needed. That society became a key element of the resistance. Expulsions and violence by the Indonesians made cultural life impossible.

After Timor-Leste gained independence, a cap on the cost of barlake was established in Ermera Municipality to reduce the financial burden on families, and allow them to spend money on more important activities such as schooling children and reducing malnutrition. The guidelines became part of the local Tara Bandu, rules decided by the community according to traditional methods.

Meanwhile, barlake lost its importance amongst the young, urban generation in independent Timor-Leste. Money is increasingly replacing traditional gifts, such as water buffalo. While up to 77 buffaloes were exchanged in the 1950s and 1960s, money replaces the animals, if only because there are not that many buffaloes any more. Also, contemporary East Timorese cannot take that much time for ceremonies and celebrations any more. In modern jobs, a month's leave cannot be taken. In Dili, where young people come to look for work, family ties are missing. When a barlake is agreed upon, realities are taken into account and the couple opts for only small a barlake. The bride and groom do not want to go into debt, but also want to honour their culture and their parents. However, more recent studies indicate that the elites in the urban centers now also use barlake.

In 2022, Dominikus Saku, the Roman Catholic Bishop of Atambua in West Timor, Indonesia, banned the Hel Keta ceremony, in which the bride price is presented the day before the wedding, at a place between the homes of the bride and groom. The groom brings chickens or pigs, which are killed. The ceremony only takes place at marriages of couple from different clans or tribes. Bishop Saku instructed the diocesan pastors not to bless a marriage if it had been preceded by a Hel Keta. He described the ceremony as a superstition contrary to the Catholic faith, and said that it places an economic burden on the families.

== Criticisms ==
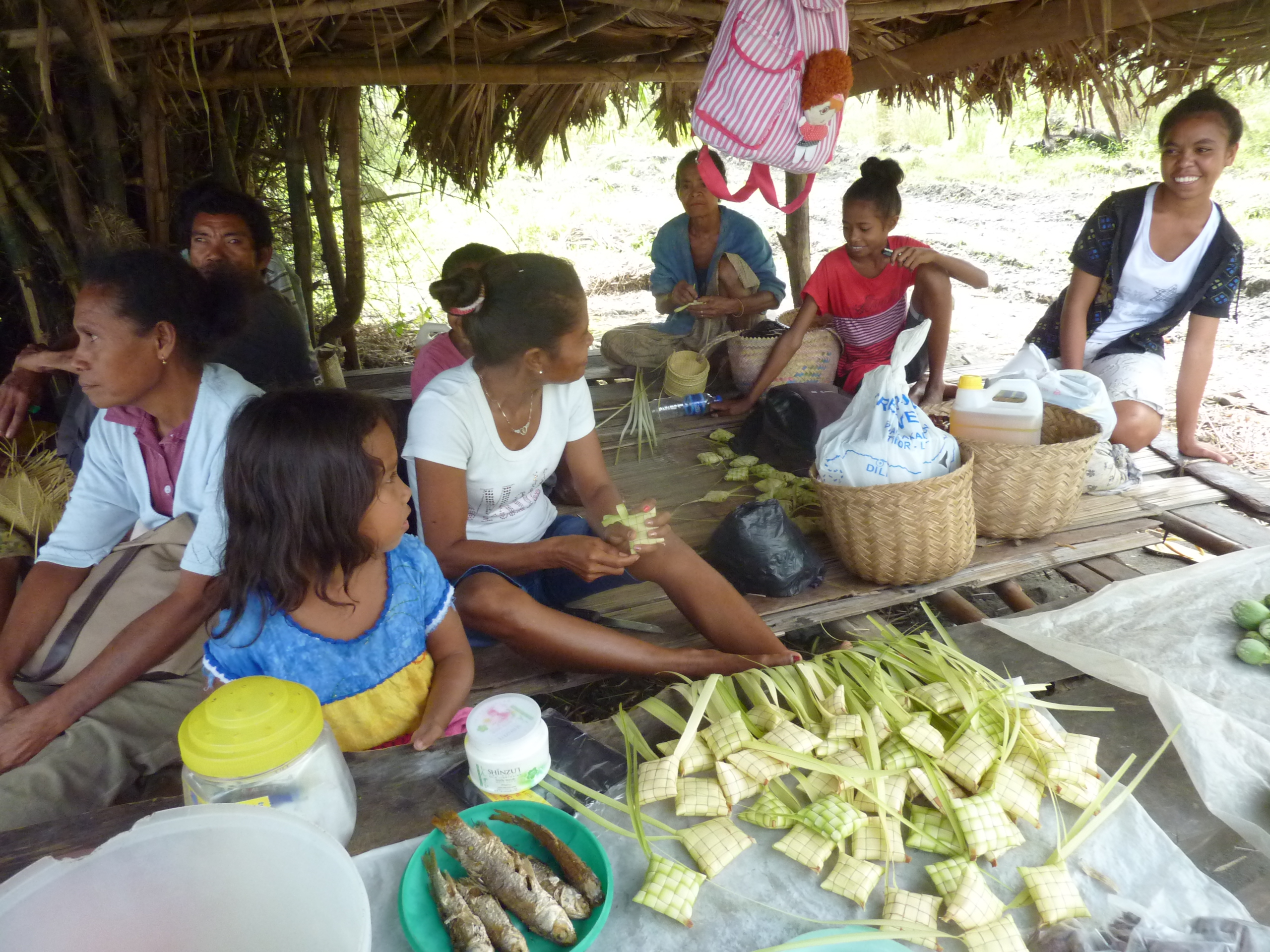
Women in Viqueque in 2014

Since the 1960s, and especially since Timor-Leste's independence in 2002, some commentators have seen barlake as the cause of, and as a mechanism for, the control and exploitation of women. Today, barlake is often reduced to a bride price, amounting to a unilateral or greater payment by the groom. For that reason, some of the rights of the man in relation to the woman are interpreted as being to discipline her, to control her and also to use violence. Domestic violence is a widespread problem in Timor, but it is striking that it is particularly widespread among the matrilineals, who do not have a bride price as part of their barlake. Thus, barlake seems to be not the only, and only a minor, reason for the violence against women. Other reasons include the perceptions of traditional and state authorities, the general acceptance of domestic violence in Timorese society, the loss of traditional rules and also defensive reactions by men against new freedoms for women.

Another accusation about the effect of barlake is that the wife feels compelled to have more children than she actually wants because of her husband, who, according to the traditional practices, owns her and her fertility. On the other hand, it is possible that barlake protects women living with husbands' families: if the marriage fails, the wife returns to her family and the husband's family would then have to repay the barlake. However, the various factors relevant to violence towards Timorese women are very intertwined and require further research.

A negative image of barlake can also be found in scientific studies, in which the expression barlake has been incorrectly translated exclusively as "bride price" or "dowry", and not recognized as an exchange of equivalent values. An example is a 2012 report of a United Nations Population Fund (UNFPA) study. In that report, the term barlake is used to refer only to the payment of the bride price, although the Lian Nain interviewees had pointed out the broader meaning. On the other hand, some of the women who had experienced violence actually reported that their husbands had understood the payment to the bride's family as a purchase of the wife. The real danger of moving from culturally significant goods to money is that the true meaning of the barlake will disappear in the mere exchange of money, and parents will be "paid" for their daughter, as occurs in cultures in the Middle East and Africa. Additionally, the production of cultural assets, such as Tais fabrics, is threatened.

Many East Timorese women still see the bright side in barlake. Lian Nain emphasise that the values of the exchanged gifts should be comparable and not exceed the families' means. Among the Naueti people, it is even said that trying to get rich by barlake lowers its spiritual value, and thus also one's social status. There is still a risk that families will go into debt for barlake and other ceremonies, which is why young city dwellers in particular no longer practise barlake. However, the prevailing view, including among many Timorese women, is that barlake is a cornerstone of East Timor's original culture, and part of a complex system of social and ritual interactions. For some male politicians, this notion is reduced to a nationalist view that puts the culture ahead of "international standards" in gender equality and requires that it be protected from Western "feminist" objectives. In general, older, married women support barlake and younger, unmarried women tend to oppose it, especially when they feel less respected in society.

Thus, the assessment of barlake revolves around the question whether it is a cultural asset that honours and protects the worth of women, or sells women into marriage, where they become victims of domestic violence. Ultimately, the controversies surrounding barlake are part of a broader debate about the role of women in Timor-Leste. Women's organizations combat the negative excesses of barlake. In general, it is recommended that the role of women be re-enforced within the traditions, and that values be emphasized. The rules would have to be followed again when it comes to the equivalence of gifts at the barlake. In addition, the gifts should be limited to cultural goods and not consist of money or commodities. UNFPA's report goes further and recommends showing traditional leaders examples from regions where there is no barlake. Patrilineal communities are to be encouraged to change their traditions and reduce or abolish barlake altogether. It is striking that today's discussions resemble the "Barlake War" in their arguments.

== See also ==
- Tais
- Tuku-Osan
