= National Archives of Timor-Leste =

National Archives of East Timor
- Arquivo Nacional de Timor-Leste (Portuguese)
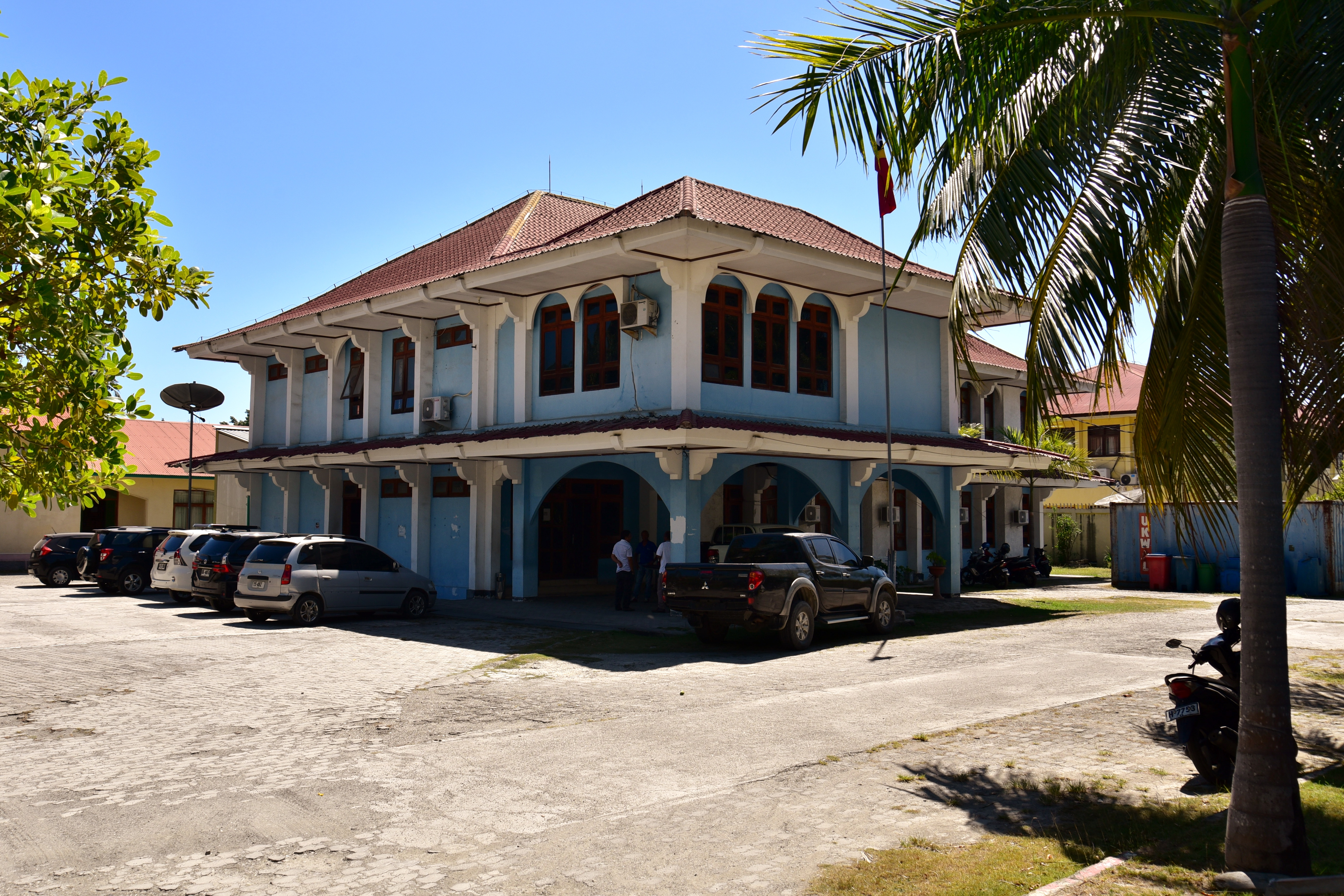
- Main building of the National Archives of East Timor in Dili.

national archive overview
- Headquarters: Dili, East Timor; 8°33′34″S 125°34′26″E
- Employees: 240
- national archive executive: Director general

The National Archives of East Timor (Portuguese: Arquivo Nacional Timor-Leste) in Dili, capital city of East Timor, is the national archive responsible for archiving official documents and other archival materials produced by the state bodies and organizations. Nominal tasks of the institution include promotion of the recovery and restoration of historically important documents, provision of the proper storage and deposit, standard development in archival work, domestic and foreign cooperation as well as the provision of access to scholars and to general public.

== History ==
When Sérgio Vieira de Mello was appointed as the administrator of the United Nations Transitional Administration in East Timor (UNTAET) on 17 November 1999 local infrastructure was mostly destroyed with widespread destruction or mismanagement of the official documents. The National Records and Archives Services Section (NARAS) was established in 1999 as a part of the UNTAET, with three international employees. The body was transformed into a section of the general Department of Civil Service and Public Employment and in July 2000 first local staff were recruited to work on the collection activities. The archive developed around the body called National Archive established in July 2000 which established as an office at the Department of Internal Administration. In 2001 two employees at the office received six months training at the Historical Archives in Lisbon and later that year the archive was upgraded to the National Directorate under the Ministry of Internal Administration. In 2004 the archives received the building which was previously used by the Australian International Force East Timor with readaptation of the building lasting until 2007.

On 11 July 2008 East Timor and Brazil signed the Complementary Adjustment to the Basic Agreement between the two states aimed at the implementation of the project "Support for the Implementation of the National Archives System of Timor-Leste". The Decree-Law No. 12/2015 of 11 March 2015 introduced the intention to establish the National Archive of Timor-Leste as an entity. In 2017 the University of Coimbra in Portugal reached an agreement with the Government of East Timor to provide support on National Archive management, professional training and the establishment of standardized procedures on conservation and use of archived documents. The agreement included participation of the university in efforts to preserve and promote the collection of Max Stahl, the English journalist who filmed the Santa Cruz massacre.

As of 2018, the National Archive of Timor-Leste has 56 employees, with 30 permanent and 26 contracted staff, 31 males and 21 females.

== See also ==
- Timorese Resistance Archive and Museum
