= History of the Indonesian rupiah =

The currency of Indonesia, the rupiah, has a long history dating back to its colonial period. Due to periods of economic uncertainty and high inflation, the currency has been re-valued several times.

== 800–1600 Native, Javanese and Chinese money ==
The first coin-like products found in Indonesia date from the 9th century Buddhist Sailendran dynasty and were produced in Indonesia until the 12th century: gold and silver massa (emas is the modern Indonesian word for "gold"), tahil and kupang, often described with the letter ma for massa or the image of sandalwood flower. Also used in this period were Mutisalah of Lesser Sunda Islands, strings of beads of Indo-Pacific origins, produced by the Sumatran Srivijaya empire, which spread to Borneo, Java and to the eastern Indonesian islands (Maluku Islands) in the 13th century. In the eastern islands those beads are saved as heirlooms until the present, using Chinese-made beads after the defeat of Srivijaya. The Majapahit empire, which became predominant in Java and Sumatra from the late 13th Century, received, with the arrival of Chinese traders, holed copper coins known as cash. These were later mimicked in Indonesia using tin or lead (further reading: Cash coins in Indonesia).

== 1600–1942 Dutch colonial money ==
When Europeans began arriving in Indonesia they brought with them gold coins from Portugal and Venice and silver Spanish dollars from Mexico, Peru and Bolivia in the Spanish colonial empire through the Philippines in the Spanish East Indies, the latter becoming the predominant trade coin in the archipelago for several hundred years. The Dutch East India Company was granted a trade monopoly over the Indies in 1600 and under the leadership of Jan Pieterszoon Coen gained effective government over the territory around Batavia on Java, their capital, with an area of influence that increased over time, and which was eventually expanded by Dutch conquest into the 20th century to include nearly all of what is now Indonesia.

The Dutch East India Company in the 17th century imported chiefly silver coin, in the form of Dutch small silver 1, 2, and 6 stuiver coins, as well as the Spanish dollar (the most popular trade coin) and Dutch trade coinage. They helped provide smaller change by selling tin to the cash mints, but generally did not produce or import it themselves.

Due to a lack of tin supply, in 1724 the company began to produce its own copper coins, 'VOC'-branded duit coins, which were minted in six provinces of The Netherlands and imported in vast numbers over the 18th and into the 19th century. There were intermittent efforts at VOC-branded silver coinage, but mostly imported Dutch and Spanish silver, which had a higher value in the Indies, was used. Although most coin was imported, (chiefly) silver and also some gold 'rupee' coins were minted locally in the 18th and early 19th century.

The first bank paper appeared with the formation of the De Bank Courant en Bank van Leening in 1752, and a number of issues were made over the next sixty years, which all tended to lose value over time due to lack of coin to back the paper.

The VOC went bankrupt on 31 December 1799 and the territories were nationalised by the then government, the Batavian Republic, which issued its own duits and made an issue of silver gulden coins in 1802. Duits were minted in large numbers in Surabaya between 1814 and 1840 from silver imported from the Netherlands. In 1854, the Netherlands Indies Guilder/Gulden was decimalised, the duit replaced by the cent and a series of coins from 1/2 cent up to 1/4 gulden was issued, all minted in The Netherlands. Larger denominations – 1/2, 1 and 2 1/2 gulden in silver, and 5 and 10 gulden in gold – were of regular Dutch issue and circulated alongside the lower denominated Indies coinage. This same series of coinage continued to be issued until independence in 1945.

The government put a stop to the inflationary bank paper with an issue of government paper in 1815, withdrawn on 30 June 1861. De Javasche Bank, the central bank of the Netherlands Indies, eventually to become Bank Indonesia, was established in 1828, subject to much stricter regulation than previous banks, and remained solvent.

== 1942–1949 Japanese invasion, and Indonesian independence – the dawn of hyperinflation in Indonesia ==
=== The Japanese invasion ===
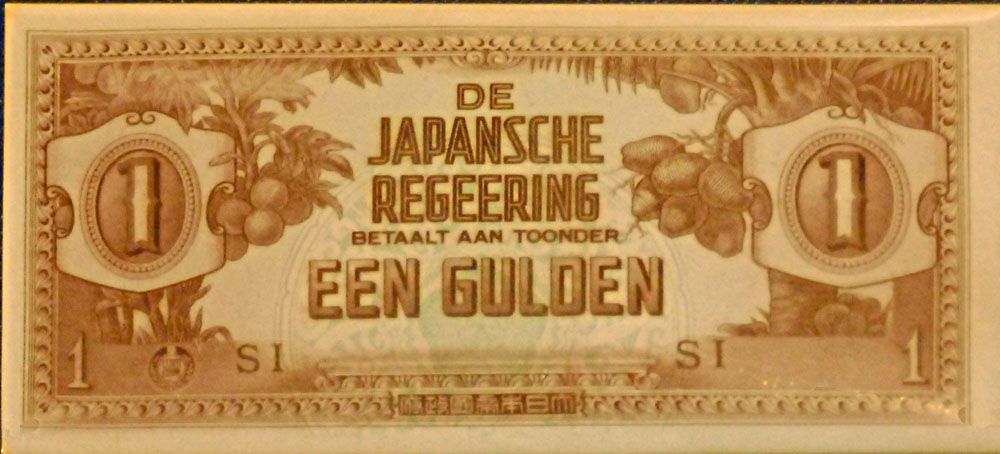
One Gulden note, Japanese occupation currency, Dutch East Indies

In December 1941 the Japanese invaded the Netherlands Indies and by March 1942 occupied most of the colony. On their invasion ships, they brought their own issue of the local money, the gulden. They liquidated the banks, including 'De Javasche Bank' and voided debt obligations. The notes issued by 'De Japansche Regeering' (the Japanese government) would be legal tender from March 1942 (although the existing notes remained valid), with notes printed from 1 cent to 10 gulden, by the new (as of April 1942) circulating bank Nanpo Kaihatsu Ginko.

The Japanese money was supposed to have the same value as the old Dutch money, with the old money to be recalled from use, but the invaders soon printed excessive quantities of money, and it was quickly apparent that hyperinflation was in progress, and hence people hoarded the Dutch money. By the end of the War, the Japanese had caused a massive increase in the paper money supply, which was 230 million gulden pre-war, to several billion post-war. This, plus the actions of the post-war Dutch administration, caused massive inflation and damage to the stability and economy of the country.

As their occupation continued, by 1944 the Japanese had determined that their long-term strategic interests were best furthered by encouraging Indonesian nationalism, and so it issued a second series of notes printed in Indonesian language, the Netherlands Indies roepiah.

Existing stocks of notes remained in use by the new Indonesian government until they had printed their own money in 1946, while the notes actually continued to be printed until early 1946 in parts of Eastern Indonesia (where the Nationalists did not have control), as a temporary measure until the Dutch had re-established their pre-war administration across the scattered islands.

=== Dutch/Allied re-occupation ===
The Dutch government, which was in exile in London, had been making preparations for the end of the war, whereupon it hoped to regain control over its colony. To do so, in recognition of the fundamentally altered financial conditions under which they would be issued, it was anticipated that a governmental issue would be needed, in view of the weakened position of the private De Javasche Bank, which had previously been issuing banknotes.

The notes were ordered in December 1942, printed in the US by the Security Bank Note Printing Company. The notes were dated 'March 1943' and labelled as 'Nederlandsch-Indische Gouvernementsgulden' printed in Dutch, along with the additional Indonesian text indicating the denomination of the notes and the word 'roepiah'. Denominations were 50 sen to 500 gulden.

At the end of the war, the Allies 'Netherlands Indies Civil Administration' (army), began to retake control of the old East Indies. It began issuing the 1943-dated money (the 'NICA gulden'), starting from 1944 in New Guinea, and subsequently in Maluku and Borneo, both of which were recaptured before the Japanese surrender on 14 August 1945. In areas under NICA control, pre-war Dutch notes were demonetised. Despite the fact that NICA had control over the outer parts of Indonesia, its authority to dictate the value of money was limited by the economic weakness of the administration and of The Netherlands itself. As a compromise NICA re-monetized the pre-war notes of 10 gulden and below, higher-valued notes were not re-issued to reduce the inflationary effect of having the pre-war currency as well as new NICA money in circulation.

After the Japanese surrender the administration was given official control of the institutions of the country by the Allies, and DJB, which had survived the war better than expected, was reincorporated on 10 October 1945.

Although the military action of the Allies in Eastern Indonesia and Kalimantan (Borneo) had introduced the NICA gulden into circulation in those areas, the transition back to Dutch control did not go smoothly in the main islands of Java and Sumatra and Allied military action gained control only over a few coastal enclaves, where Japanese money was used, large quantities of which were in storage by the Japanese.

The 'uang merah' ('red money' (the 10 rupiah note was red, and there may also be a reference to blood, as the money was unpopular with the Indonesian revolutionaries)) faced nationalist opposition to the principle of money issued by the Dutch, exacerbated by the fact that in spite of stated intentions to adopt a less colonial stance post-war, the notes had been printed in Dutch with a large picture of the Dutch Queen Wilhelmina.

When the first NICA money appeared in Java, Sukarno issued an immediate decree, of 2 October 1945, to declare that the NICA notes were illegal.

Lacking the control needed to issue money effectively, the Dutch determined that it would be inadvisable to issue NICA money in the towns of Java and Sumatra and prohibited their import.

With Japanese still acting as local government in Java and Sumatra, it was necessary for NICA to preserve the value of the Japanese money as much as possible, since it was the only means for them to pay the bills incurred in maintaining order. In many cases, the Japanese were instructed to simply print more money, and the amount of Japanese currency in circulation continued to increase rapidly: the Japanese-originated inflation continued with increased pace. By February 1946, 2 billion Japanese money out of 2.5 billion captured in the state printers, had been spent, a vast sum against the entire pre-war circulation of less than 500 million gulden.

Due to the dwindling supplies of money, destruction of the printing plates at the main printers for re-issue, and disquiet amongst European forces at payment in Japanese money, which was losing value constantly, it was finally decided to issue the NICA gulden in Java on 6 March 1946. Pre-war notes of 5 gulden and below only were to retain validity, and the Japanese money was to be exchanged at a rate of 33 to 1.

This action enraged the Indonesians, who imposed a 5-year prison sentence on its use. One army regiment even went as far as to execute people carrying the money, hoisting their bodies in public with the money pinned onto them.

Due to the difficulties associated with using the money, the supply of food and basic goods from the Republican interior was poor, and the NICA money by June 1946 had fallen to a black market value of just 10 of the Japanese money (which was still the preferred money throughout Java), despite Dutch attempts to enforce the rate.

=== The first Indonesian rupiah – in Java ===
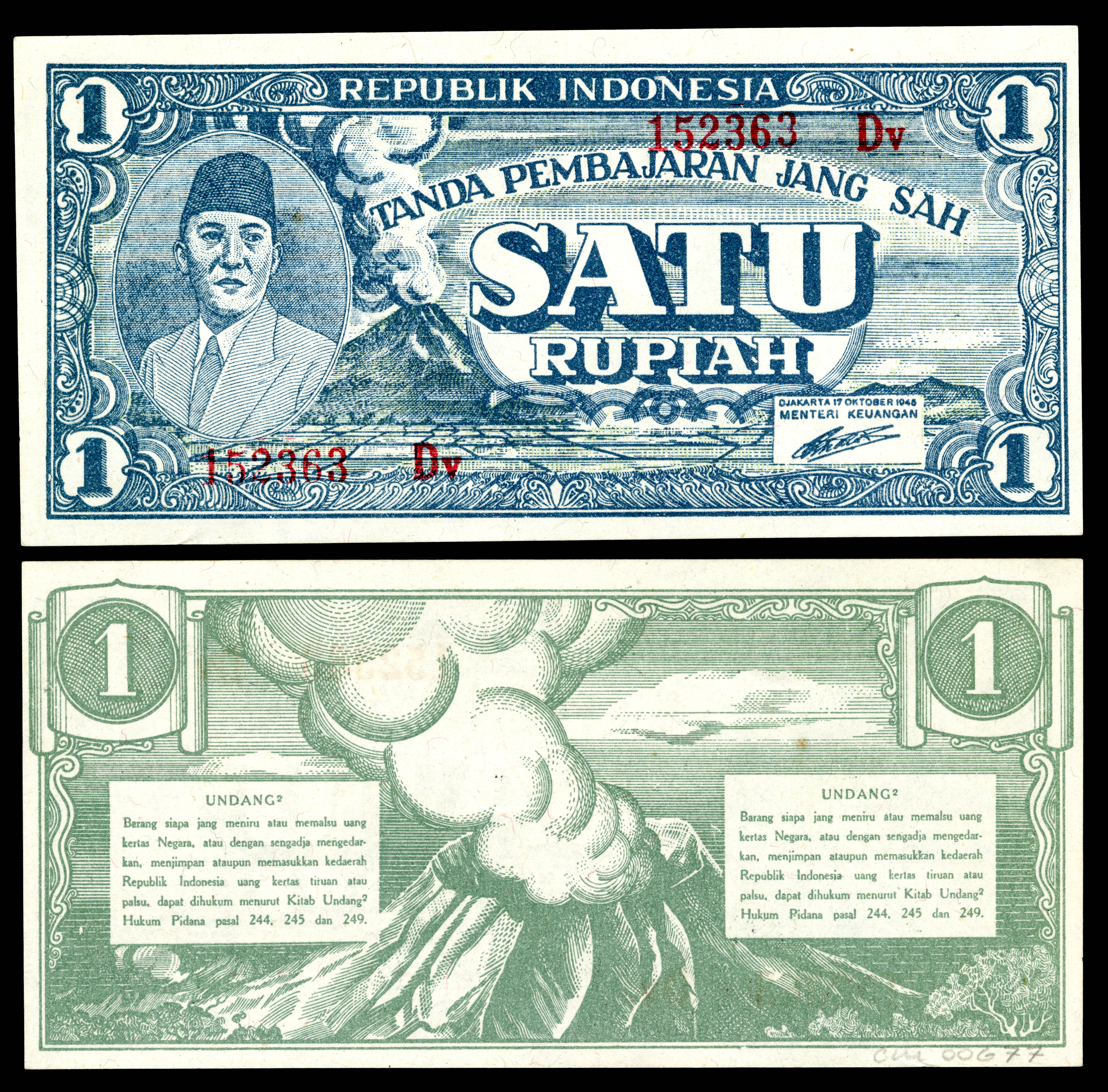
One rupiah from the first issue (1945) of Republic of Indonesia banknotes. Sukarno depicted on the face and a smoking volcano on the back.

Although the Republican government was firmly opposed to the use of the Dutch NICA money, seeing its exclusion as an important tool in the fight with the Dutch, the issue of its own money was slightly more considered.

After their 2 October proclamation on NICA money, it declared the next day that Japanese money as well as pre-NICA Dutch money would be legal tender in the Republic, with both holding the same value, despite the greatly inflated quantity of Japanese money circulating, reflecting in part the fact that the Dutch money was no longer backed by gold reserves, the gold having been evacuated in the early part of the war.

The Indonesians had been advised by the British that an issue of Indonesian money would be financial and political suicide, but their resolve was firm. Their first notes, dated 1945, were in preparation when the Indonesian printing works and all the money in it was seized by the Allies (which at this point included in the British, tasked with restoring order) in their successful assault on Jakarta in January 1946.

The printing plates survived the attack and with the Dutch decision to finally introduce the NICA gulden to Java in March 1946 seen as an offensive act the Indonesians pressed ahead with the reprinting, an act spurred, as with the Dutch, by the dwindling supplies of Japanese money from the vaults of the banks in the cities they controlled (approximately 600 million Japanese roepiah).

With Indonesian resources increasingly poorly matched against the Dutch, and only the small G. Kolff & Co Malang printers at their disposal to print the money, printing of the money took several months, to July 1946.

The Republican government declared that the new central bank of Indonesia would be Bank Negara Indonesia, established on 5 July 1946, occupying the offices of De Javasche Bank in Yogyakarta, the stronghold of the republic.

The Indonesian rupiah was first issued by proclamation of 3 October 1946. In the year or so prior, the Japanese money had been a vital conduit of Republican goods to the Dutch enclaves, but the decree brought this to an end: all Japanese money was to be deposited with Republic banks by 30 October 1946. Providing the depositors could account for how the money was obtained, they would be entitled to new 'Oeang Republik Indonesia' (ORI) at the rate of 50 Japanese rupiah to 1 rp ORI. Outstanding debts were revalued according to their date of origin, with debts arising prior to 1943 (before the Japanese-induced inflation) converted at par, debts from 1943 to 1945 at 20 to 1, and those arising that year at the same 50 to 1 ratio.

This deflationary policy had been derived from the Dutch geldzuivering of Dutch Minister of Finance Pieter Lieftinck (later executive director of the World Bank and International Monetary Fund (IMF)), who had trained Sumitro Djojohadikusumo (who had returned to Indonesia along with many other educated Indonesians after the War) in economics at university in The Netherlands. As in The Netherlands, each citizen was to be issued with 1 rp to kick-start the circulation of new money. Undeposited money after October was declared worthless.

One rupiah of the new money was said to be worth 0.5 grams of gold, a similar rate to the pre-war Dutch currency (which contained 3 grams of fine gold in the 5 gulden and 6 in the 10 gulden coin), although this was not backed by metal reserves, merely a proclamation of purchasing power.

Due to a fear that the deposited money would not be returned, there was panic buying of goods in the days following the decree, and prices of food (in Japanese money) soared by up to 30 times, with the black market exchange rate to the NICA gulden rising to 120 to 1.

With the end of Japanese money in the main Republican stronghold in Java as a conduit between the Republican interior and Dutch enclaves, the Dutch were forced to act, ending the exchange of Japanese money on 30 October 1946, to avoid a flood of unexchanged Japanese money being brought for exchange with NICA gulden. Thus in Java at this point two currencies circulated, the 1943-dated Dutch NICA gulden, in Dutch-controlled areas, and the 1945-dated ORI in the Indonesian enclaves.

The Indonesian resistance was highly fragmented, strongest in rural villages, and lacking the ability to supply money across its extent, the Japanese money continued to be used in Banten, West Java, as well as all of republican Sumatra.

There was never an official exchange rate between NICA gulden and Indonesian rupiah, but with popular support for the rupiah strong, 1 ORI rupiah was initially valued at 5 NICA gulden. The currency, however, depreciated fast, falling to 2 gulden within 1 week, as the market gauged fair value, and by the end of 1946 to par. By March 1947, it was worth half a gulden, and by July 0.3 gulden. This inflation was caused by the Republican government, which was printing money to meet its obligations in the face of limited income of its own. By January 1947, 310 million rupiah had been printed in republican Java alone, half the entire pre-war gulden money supply.

Due to the limited printing capacity of the government, it focused printing on 100 rupiah notes. Limited supply of smaller notes meant that the 100 rupiah notes were worth less than a combination of smaller notes. Rampant forgery only served to exacerbate the inflation of the Indonesian money.

Despite laws put in place to stop hoarding of goods, confidence in the currency could not be maintained. In Jakarta, the Indonesian money was worth even less than elsewhere, as a consequence of the demand for NICA-denominated imported goods. Republican attempts to maintain the value of Indonesian money (which was largely backed by the supply of rice from inner Java) could only slow, rather than stop, its decline.

Over the years of the Indonesian revolution, three further issues of banknotes followed, all printed in Yogyakarta, two in 1947 alone, with a fourth, much more limited in number, being issued in 1948.

=== Dutch money of 1947–1949 ===
New money was issued by the Dutch from July 1947, in the form of fully Dutch/Indonesian bilingual gulden/roepiah notes from 'De Javasche Bank'. These notes were dated 1946, and consisted of 5 (violet), 10 (violet), 25 (red) gulden notes.

The supply of these soon exhausted, and the administration remonetised all of the pre-War DJB and government money as well, circulating unissued paper still stored in the vaults. This caused a 50% increase in the amount of money in circulation from 1947 to 1949. The administration also issued bronze and silver coins in the original pre-war denominations, minted from 1943 to 1945 in the US, but due to inflation, the coins were worth more as scrap, and many were melted into household goods and silver artefacts. As a result, it issued treasury notes instead, from 1 December 1947, in 10 and 25 sen denominations. These notes were successful as they were in Indonesian (with Dutch and Indonesian on the reverse) and stated to have been issued by 'Indonesia' (being NICA), and continued to be utilised by the Indonesian government even after independence, until 1951, when Indonesia acquired its first coins.

=== Local banknotes of Republic of Indonesia, 1947–1949 ===
As the Republican government never had effective control of Indonesia beyond Java, from 1947 it legislated on 26 August 1947 that regional outposts in Sumatra and Java could issue their own money to replace the Japanese money, with exchange for true ORI envisaged when peacetime eventually enabled it, in part to inhibit the circulation of NICA gulden. At least thirty different towns and districts in Sumatra issued their own money, with around a dozen towns in Java doing so, starting with Banten in December 1947.

The notes were marked with the place of issue and were in different designs from the national money.

== 1949–1958: Recognition of independence, and the new 'Indonesian Rupiah' ==
=== 1950–1952 Indonesian independence recognised ===
In November 1949, the Dutch-Indonesian Round Table Conference held in The Hague, brokered peace and recognition independence for the Indonesian state, as the Republik Indonesia Serikat (United States of Indonesia), a federation of states consisting of the Republic of Indonesia (republican Java and Sumatra), along with fifteen other states.

The accord provided that The Netherlands was to retain economic influence over the republic until Indonesia had paid the debt run up by NICA in fighting the war with Indonesia. It was agreed that private Dutch-owned De Javasche Bank was to be restored as the central bank of Indonesia, despite resentment among Indonesian nationalists, the Indonesian-established BNI becoming a development bank.

A brief issue of notes was issued by the "Republic Indonesia Serikat", from June 1950, consisting of 5 and 10 rupiah notes, but with the merger of the separate states into the Republic of Indonesia in March and April 1950, with the formal declaration of the unitary Republic of Indonesia confirmed on 17 August 1950, this money was short-lived.

==== The Sjafruddin cut ====
The new "Republik Indonesia Serikat" decided to address the amount of money circulating (due to the treaty the government was required to accept the NICA gulden as legal tender as well), which had reached 3.9 billion rupiah. A bewildering variety of money was in circulation, including local and national rupiah, Japanese, pre-war, and NICA Dutch moneys.

Due to the large amount of currency, the minister of finance, Sjafruddin Prawiranegara, sought to reduce the money supply by one half. This reform was decreed from 19 March 1950. People were to cut all of their notes of 5 gulden and up in half, with the left half to be replaced with new banknotes, and the right half for a government bond with a 3% coupon. In addition, half of all bank deposits over 400 rupiah were also to be forcibly used to buy the government bonds.

As part of the exchange, local and Republik Indonesia money was also demonetised, with all old Republik Indonesia notes no longer valid after 1 May 1950. 125 Rp of the first "Republik Indonesia" rupiah (issued in Java) was exchanged for 1 Rp of new DJB notes. Higher exchange rates were in place for local currencies, some of which had been heavily devalued by the over-printing of money by the army. The recently devalued Rupiah Baru of Aceh were exchangeable at 1.75 to 1.

=== 1951: Nationalisation of De Javasche Bank – transformation to Bank Indonesia ===
Due to the desire to remove the influence of the DJB, which was dominated by Dutch and felt to be an unwanted foreign influence on the country, and to inflamed tensions caused by the refusal of the Dutch to transfer the territory of Dutch New Guinea to the Republic, the government moved to nationalise the Dutch bank. This action, announced on 30 April 1951, involved the repeal of the old Java Bank Law of 1922, preventing non-Dutch citizens from owning shares in the bank, and negotiations with the Amsterdam Stock Exchange. The purchase was agreed at 120% of the value of the bank (which was valued at 9 million Dutch gulden), with Dutch opinion holding that the bank was properly an Indonesian asset, and hence nationalisation was a valid action. The nationalisation was completed on 15 December 1951, with DJB becoming a government institution of Indonesia.

In addition to this act of nationalisation, on 3 October 1951, the Republic passed an Emergency Act on valid currency, to repeal the Indische Muntwet Act of 1912, which still governed valid currency in Indonesia. The consequence of the new Act was that old Dutch coins would be void for payment, and Indonesian rupiah coins would be issued with values of 1, 5, 10, 25, and 50 sen under the remit of the Indonesian government. Low-denomination Dutch banknotes were to be withdrawn in due course. This Act saw the first Republik Indonesia money being issued, of 1 and 2 1/2 rupiah denominations, continuing the split between denominations of under 5 gulden and 5 and above between state and central bank initiated by the Dutch.

=== 1953–1958: The Birth of Bank Indonesia ===
In order that it could discontinue the issue of the resented 'De Javasche Bank' money, the government completed the Indonesianisation of DJB, with the bank becoming Bank Indonesia on 1 July 1953 via the Principal Act on Bank Indonesia 1953. The bank had responsibility for the issue of banknotes of 5 rupiah and above (as had DJB), and the first Bank Indonesia money appeared from 1953.

== 1959–1965: currency devaluation and spiralling inflation ==
The economy was ravaged by inflation, prices had tripled from 1953 to 1959, and Sukarno wanted to devalue the currency. Disagreement over this policy led to the end of Loekman Hakim as Governor of Bank Indonesia on 31 July 1959: He was replaced by Soetikno Slamet.

With the unwilling ex-governor replaced, the official exchange rate was devalued on 1 August 1959 by 75% from 11.4 to 45 to the US$ (the unofficial rate was around half of that, and it had been 3.8 to the dollar in 1949). In addition, the 500 Rp and 1000 Rp notes were devalued 90% on 24 August 1959 to 50 and 100 Rp. The actual notes affected were the '1946' 500 gulden, and the '1952' culture and the 'animal' notes of 500 and 1000rp notes.

Thus, as of September 1959, the largest note in circulation Indonesia was of 100 rupiah.

== 1965–1991: the 1000 to 1 revaluation of the rupiah ==
Rampant inflation, which was 27% in 1961, but jumped to 174% in 1962, by 1965 was 600%, had seen the largest denomination banknote increase 100-fold, from 100 rupiah in September 1959, to 1000 rupiah in May 1960, to 5,000 in October 1963 and finally 10,000 rupiah in August 1964. As a result, during the Indonesian political turmoil of 1965, the 'new rupiah' was introduced on 13 December 1965, at a rate of 1000 of the old unit. The price index at the end of 1965 had been calculated at 363 times higher than in 1958, and prices had risen approximately seven times over the previous 12 months. In real terms (i.e. with inflation taken into account), a labourer in Jakarta was estimated to have earned 40 per cent of his earnings in 1958. Although the devaluation in notes was 1,000 to 1, prices were reckoned to fall by only 10 times.

This devaluation had the side-effect of unifying the Indonesian Rupiah with the Riau rupiah ( the West Irian rupiah lasted until 1971 ). Denominations of the new rupiah ranged from 1 sen (worthless even at issue) up to 100 rupiah, with 500 and 1000 rupiah added soon after.

By 1968 the Suharto New Order had been established, and Bank Indonesia, as of 1968 was given sole right to issue banknotes (including notes below 5 rupiah) as well as coins (which had previously been the issue of the central government), which it did in a range from 1 to 1000 rupiah. In 1970, Indonesia added 5000 and 10,000 rupiah banknotes to the range in 1970, while, with inflation finally under control, coinage was re-introduced, starting at 1 rupiah, and ranging up to 100 rupiah. September 1975 saw sub-100 rupiah notes permanently withdrawn from circulation.

== 1992–1999: before and after the Asian financial crisis ==
By 1992, the rupiah was worth less than one fifth of what it had been worth when the 10,000 rupiah note had been introduced in 1970, and so a 20,000 rupiah note was produced, then the largest note ever seen in Indonesia.

The 1997 Asian financial crisis reduced the rupiah's value by over 80% in a few months and was a major factor in the overthrow of President Suharto's government. The rupiah had traded at about 2000–3000 rupiah per 1 USD, but reached a low of 16,800 rupiah per dollar in June 1998. The currency, which had been relatively stable in prior years, had its value destroyed. The government did not take any action to demonetise or revalue the banknotes, "Direksi 1998" merely redesigned the 10,000 and 20,000 rupiah notes.

"Direksi 1999" saw a new Soepratman design for the 50,000 rupiah, replacing the commemorative note of Suharto, who had resigned after more than 30 years as Indonesia's president in the wake of the crisis.

The banknote line-up was extended with a new denomination of 100,000 rupiah in 1999, by then worth about US$12.

500 million notes of the 100,000 rupiah polymer note were printed, to all be issued within a month of November 1999. This was part of Indonesia's millennium bug preparations, lest there should be a great demand for cash after the new year. Polymer was chosen because, according to Bank Indonesia, plastic would be harder to counterfeit and would last longer. However, the notes were not popular in banks as counting machines were unable to count them accurately and there have been issues with the money sticking to one another due to the heat of the machine, and Indonesia has reverted to the use of paper notes.

== 2000–2005: redesigns to all of Indonesia's denominations of banknotes ==
"Direksi 2000" brought a new 1,000 rupiah note, with the 100 and 500 rupiah notes having been discontinued due to the dramatic devaluation of Indonesia's currency.

"Direksi 2001" redesigned the 5,000 rupiah, while "Direksi 2004" brought an end to the polymer 100,000 rupiah notes, replacing with a paper design, as well the issue of a new more secure 20,000 rupiah note.

"Direksi 2005" re-designed the 10,000 and 50,000 rupiah note.

== 2016: all new Indonesia's denominations of banknotes and coins ==
On 19 December 2016, Bank Indonesia launched the all new design of rupiah banknotes and coins. They started to place the text Negara Kesatuan Republik Indonesia on their banknotes, rather than Bank Indonesia on the previous design. This practice was started earlier on the 2014 100,000 banknote based on the 2004 design.

== 2022: Rupiah redesign ==
On 18 August 2022, the governor of Bank Indonesia, Perry Warjiyo, and the Minister of Finance of Indonesia, Sri Mulyani Indrawati, introduced a new design of the 2016 banknotes. It still kept the imagery of the 2016 banknotes, however, they've improved the color contrast between banknotes, added magnetic ink as a safety feature, and much more.

== Plans to redenominate the Rupiah ==
In August 2010 Bank Indonesia proposed to redenominate the rupiah by truncating the last three zero digits (dividing by 1000). The redenomination is meant to simplify daily transactions, which often run into millions of rupiah. The plan under consideration would be completed by 2015 at the soonest, but more likely by 2020. It would reduce the exchange rate with the US dollar from about Rp14,600 (old) to Rp14.6 (New). The plan has raised public concern that the monetary policy may devalue the currency. Bank Indonesia Governor Darmin Nasution immediately announced that the planned redenomination of the national currency would not inflict any financial losses as the measure would only strike a few zeros from the current denominations.

In 2023, Bank Indonesia governor Perry Warjiyo reiterated that the central bank had considered redenomination for a long time; however, in order to ensure its success, stable macroeconomic, political, and monetary conditions must be achieved, and therefore the timing must be right. He also stated that the process is listed in BI's plans for 2020-2024; however, due to the coronavirus pandemic, it has not come into fruition.
