= Alice Springs Friends of East Timor =

The Alice Springs Friends of East Timor (ASFOET) was an organisation based in Alice Springs, Australia, which opposed the Indonesian occupation of East Timor. ASFOET remained active throughout the 1990s, lobbying and protesting in favor of the independence of East Timor.

It was created in 1991 in the aftermath of the Santa Cruz massacre. Its founding members came primarily from the Uniting Church in Australia and the Alice Springs Peace Group (ASPG). According to Green Left, ASFOET setup funding to support the families of people killed by the Indonesian military.

ASFOET attempted to send activists clandestinely into East Timor with mixed success. Notable members of ASFOET included the nun Veronica Brady and the Aboriginal activist Marcia Langton. ASFOET was once presided over by indigenous activist John Breen, who later went onto be awarded an Order of Australia for his work serving pacific indigenous communities.
