= Tuku-Osan =

Traditional coin-working and metalworking practice of Timor-Leste

Tuku Osan Masikana, also recorded as Tuku-Osan, is a traditional metalworking practice in Timor-Leste. Artisans reshape coins and combine coin metal with gold, bronze, or silver to make jewellery, including belak chest discs, kaibauk head ornaments, earrings, necklaces, and rings. For example, the aldeia of Tunu Bibi in Tapó Memo suco, Maliana Administrative Post, Bobonaro Municipality is a place where the knowledge remained in use.

Historian Ivo Carneiro de Sousa wrote that old Spanish silver reales, including eight-real coins, were melted and worked by hand into jewellery, and that some kaibauk retained whole coins as decoration. He also observed the continued use of nineteenth- and early twentieth-century Mexican pesos as a source of silver.

This practice is used as a craft skill of coin-working in Bobonaro, as a wider rural blacksmithing tradition that makes ritual accessories, knives, and tools from scrap metal.

== Terminology and scope ==
This tradition appears as Tuku-Osan or Tuku Osan Masikana in Timor-Leste National Commission List for UNESCO heritage. Tuku-Osan means "iron striking" and its practitioners are called tukun-besi, or blacksmiths. It includes the forging of scrap iron into practical implements as well as ceremonial metalwork.

== Historical background ==
Metal discs and crescent-shaped head ornaments were documented in Timorese ceremonial dress. A collection by Portugal's Assembly of the Republic quotes a seventeenth-century description of Timorese chiefs wearing a large round gold plate at the neck and a gold half-moon ornament on the forehead, identifying these forms with the belak and kaibauk. Kaibauk is a composite crescent diadem and the largest examples were reserved for a liurai, a traditional ruler. The belak is one or more metal discs suspended from the neck.

Imported currency supplied both metal and visible ornament. Carneiro de Sousa reported that collections formerly held by the Dili Museum included Spanish silver reales from the sixteenth and seventeenth centuries. He connected their presence in Timor with the movement of American silver through the Philippines, China, Macau, and other Southeast Asian trading centres. Timorese jewellers melted and hand-worked reales, while some kaibauk displayed the coins without fully concealing their original form.

By the nineteenth century, Mexican silver currency was also circulating in Portuguese Timor. Carneiro de Sousa noted that later jewellers sought large Mexican pesos for their silver content.

Timorese metal ornaments were also held as inherited property. Carneiro de Sousa grouped kaibauk and belak with swords, textiles, drums, ceramics, and ancestor figures kept in sacred houses and associated with the standing of a lineage.

== Materials and working process ==
The worker uses specialised hand tools and moulds, heats the metal in a fire, and supplies air to the flame through a tube. The heated piece is held with a handling tool, hammered or struck into shape, and cooled in water.

The equipment of a forge used for the wider form of Tuku-Osan includes a small wood-fired furnace, bellows made from bamboo or wood, hammers, anvils, and chisels. Pieces of scrap iron are heated until malleable and then repeatedly struck on an anvil.

== Products ==
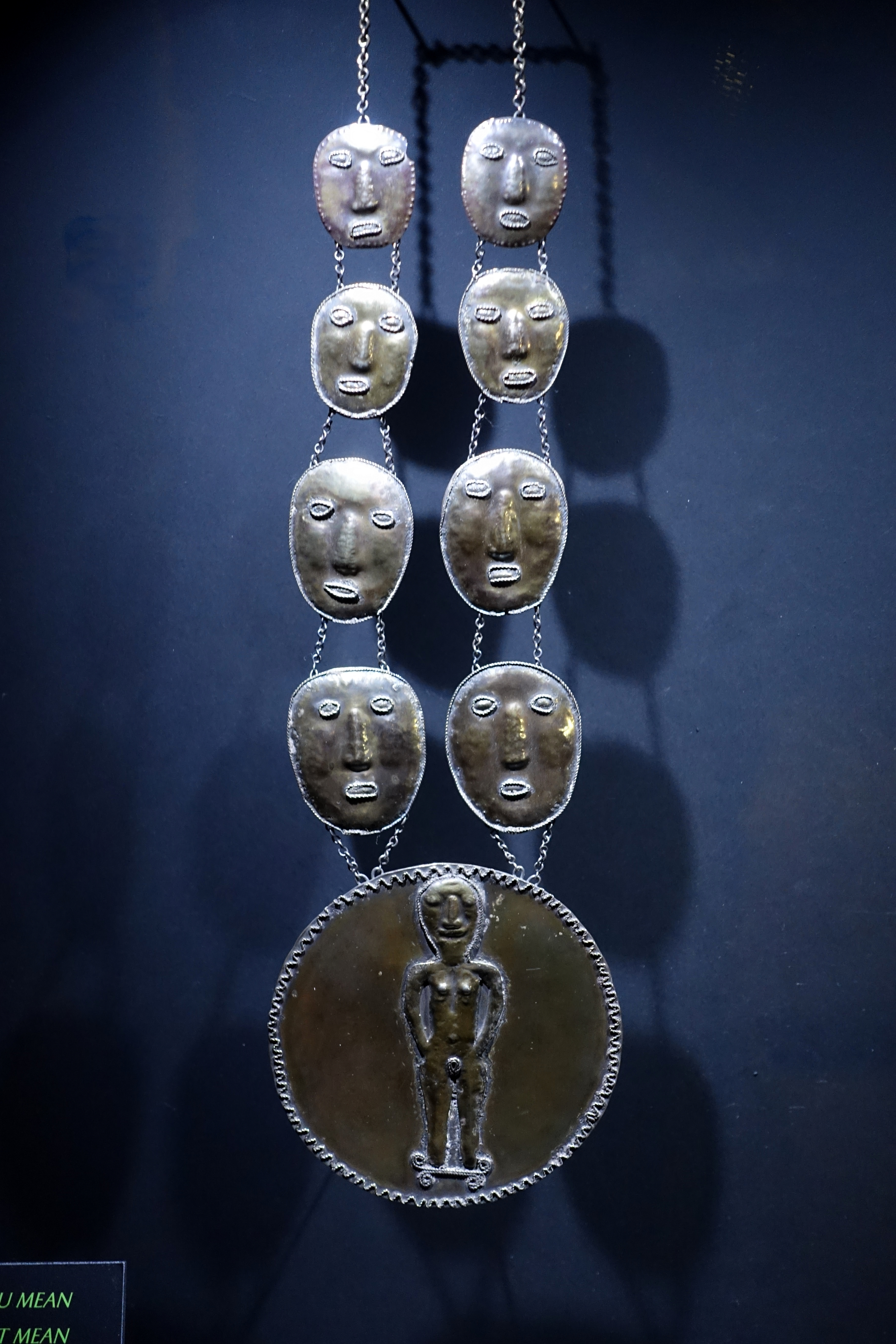
A gold belak from Atsabe, Ermera, dated to about 1930 and held by the Museu do Oriente.

The best documented product is the belak, a round disc worn on the chest or suspended from the neck. The Tetum meaning of the word is "disc" and bronze as the usual material, with gold and silver alternatives. Historical examples may be plain in outline or decorated on the visible face. Carneiro de Sousa described silver and brass belak with a central raised element and noted that several discs could be worn together.

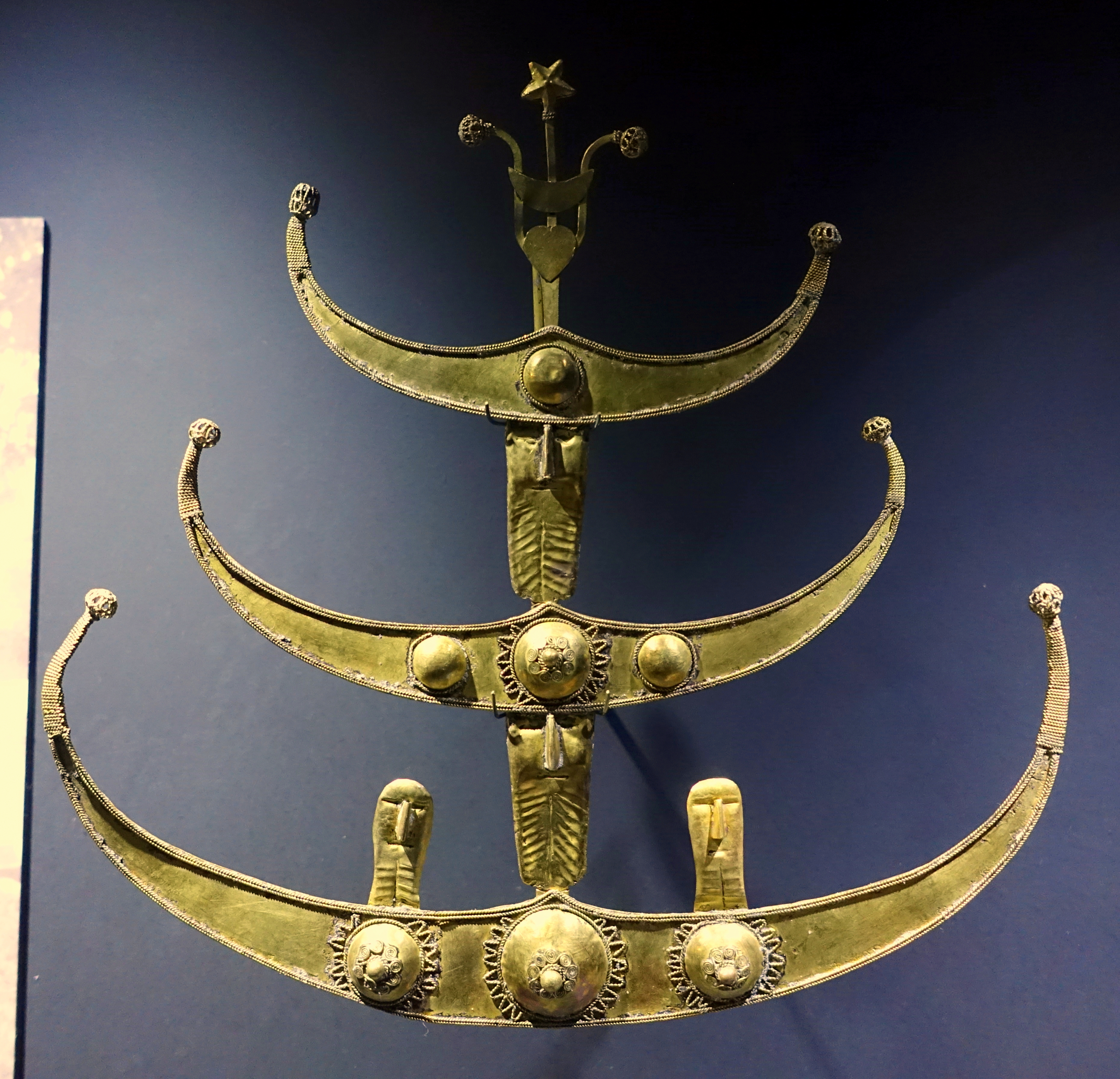
A Timorese kaibauk in the Museu do Oriente.

The kaibauk is a crescent-shaped head ornament. Sources differ in the details they stress. The Portuguese parliamentary collection treats it as an ornament of rank and says that the largest type was worn by a liurai. Carneiro de Sousa records both silver and brass examples, describes the crescent as resembling buffalo horns, and notes use in civic festivals and marriage alliances. Some historical kaibauk were decorated with imported silver coins.

Earrings, necklaces, and rings, as smaller objects are placed Tuku Osan Masikana within jewellery production as well as the making of large ceremonial ornaments, extending the product range to decorative arm rings called li'uli'u, ritual knives, other symbolic accessories, and functional tools.

== Dress, ceremony, and social use ==
Jewellery made through the practice is used in customary ceremonies among several ethnic groups. Belak and kaibauk may form part of ceremonial dress, be displayed as inherited property, or be transferred in family and ceremonial exchanges.

Historical descriptions associate the larger ornaments with social distinction. Kaibauk and belak are linked with the Timorese aristocracy. Carneiro de Sousa also observes that patterns of use changed and that ornaments formerly restricted by status came to be worn more widely at public gatherings.

Metal accessories are also used at weddings, funerals, and traditional dances. Some blades and tools are believed by their users to have protective or spiritual properties, especially when used in sacred rites or by lia-nain, custodians of customary knowledge.

== Transmission and continuity ==
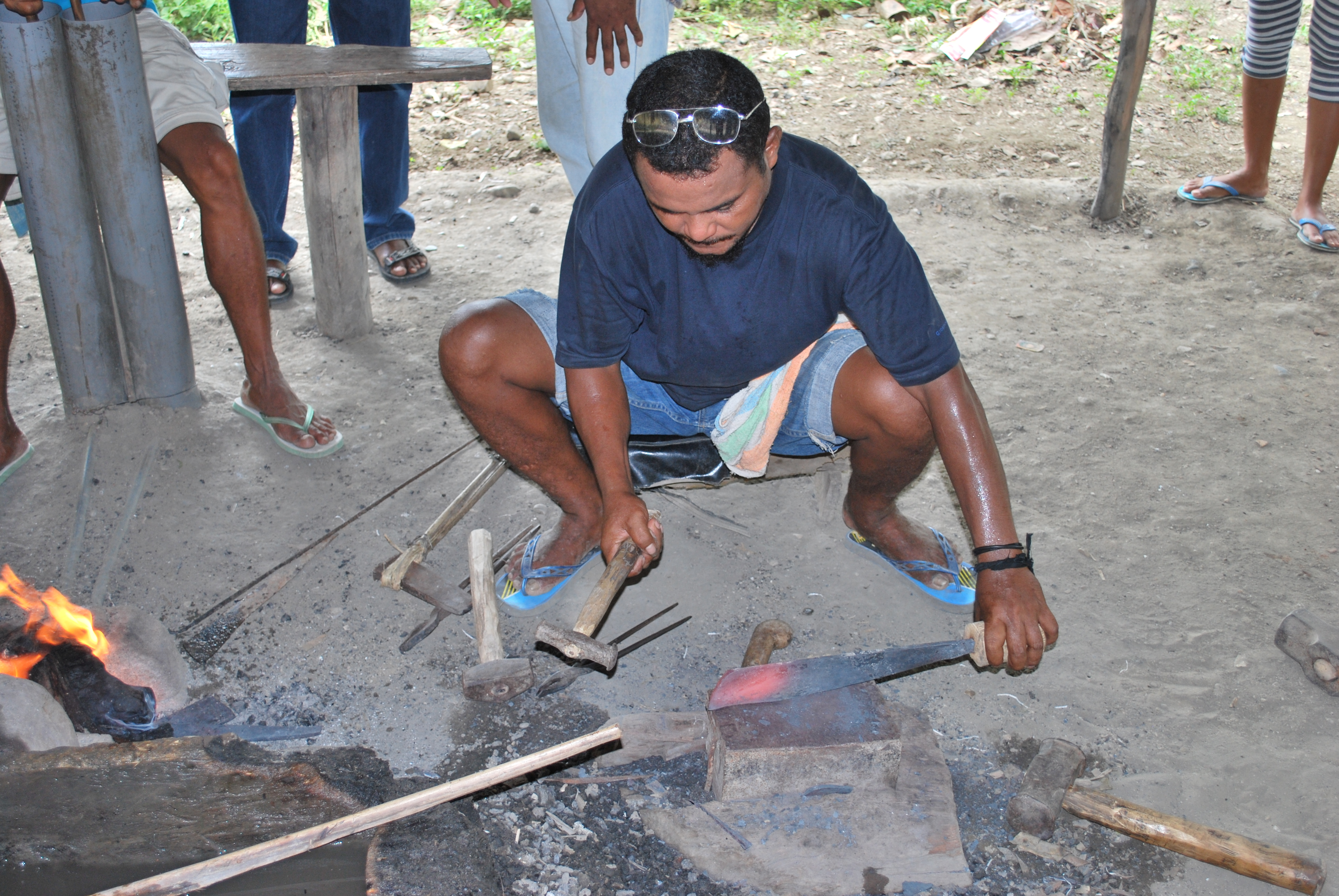
A blacksmith at work in Buanurac, Loi-Huno, in 2010.

The most precise location of practicing this tradition is Tapó Memo in Bobonaro Municipality. Boys begin by watching and assisting fathers or uncles, then learn control of the fire, use of tools, shaping of metal, and the customary meanings attached to particular objects.

However, there is a reduced demand for handmade ironwork after the spread of factory-made tools and modern materials. Rural communities continue to commission blacksmiths for ceremonial requirements.

== Museum collections ==
Timorese jewellery and metal ornaments have also appeared in museum exhibitions. The 2008–2009 exhibition Husi Bei Ala Timor Sira Nia Liman / From the Hands of Our Ancestors, organised by the Museum and Art Gallery of the Northern Territory, brought together historic and contemporary art and craft.

== See also ==
- Culture of Timor-Leste
- Blacksmithing
- Jewellery making
- Tais
- Surik
