= Motael Church =

Roman Catholic church in Timor-Leste

Coordinates: 8°33′03″S 125°34′14″E

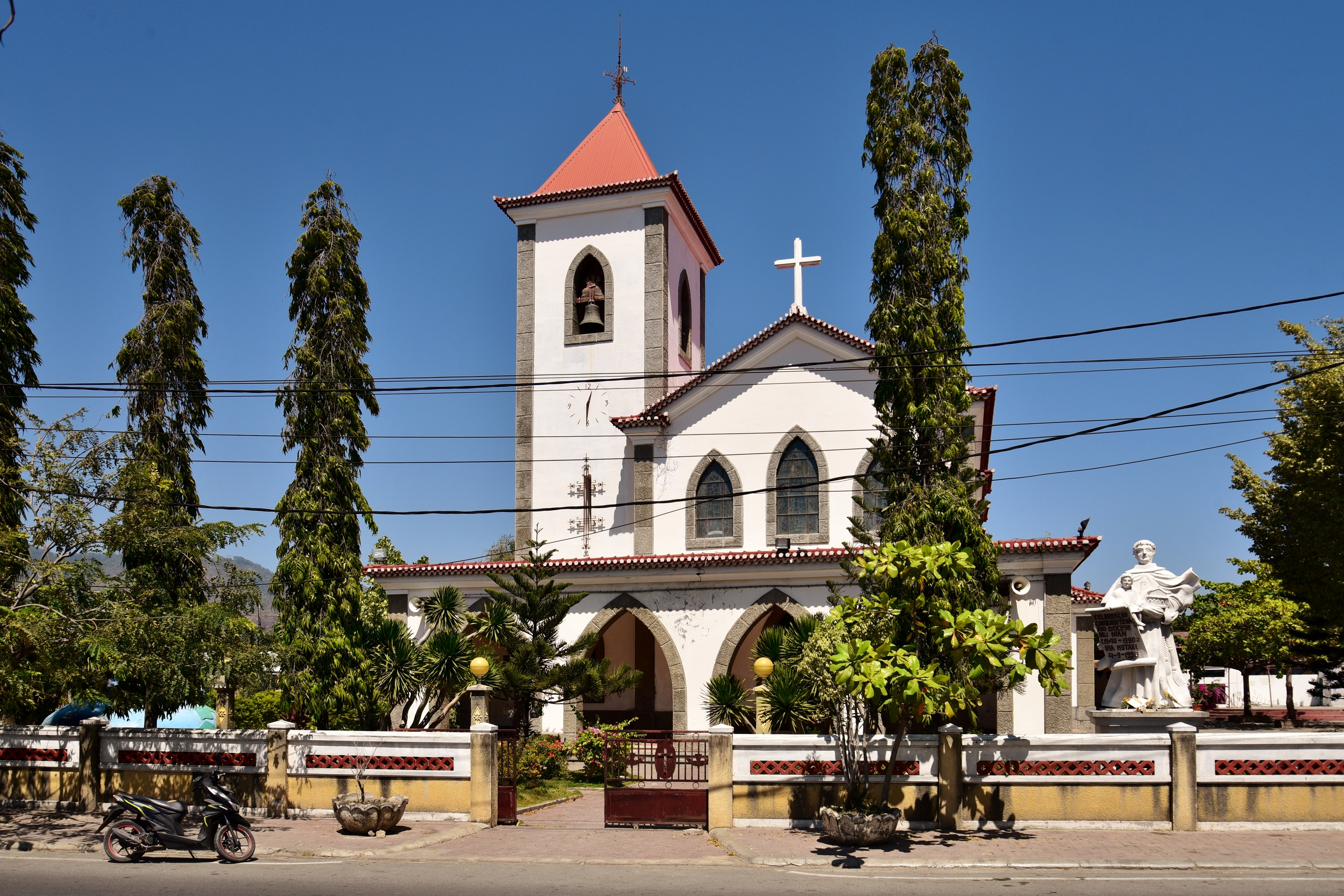
The church in 2023

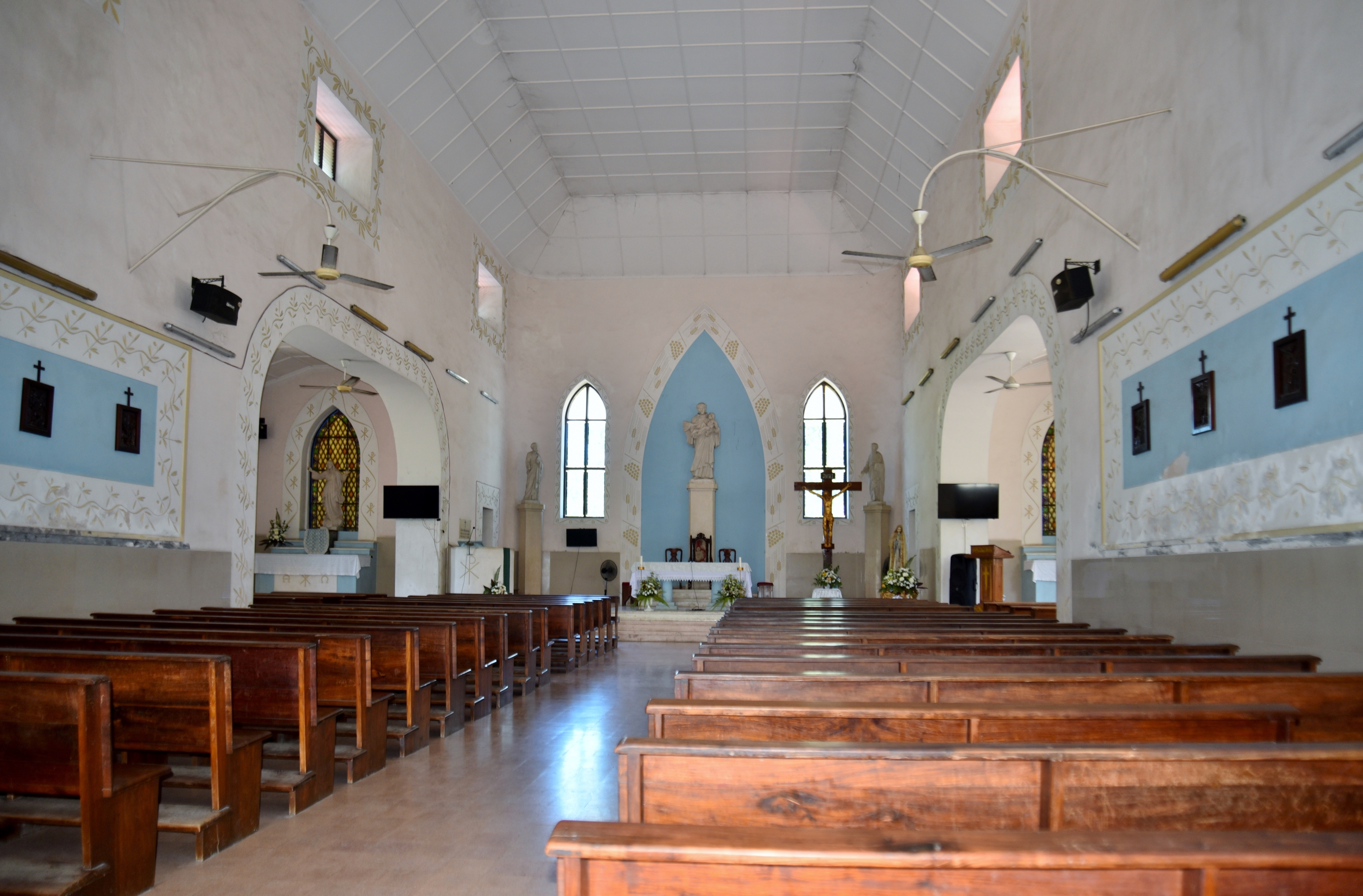
Interior of the church in 2023

The Church of Santo António de Motael (Portuguese: Igreja de Santo António de Motael) is the oldest Roman Catholic church in Timor-Leste and is located in Dili, the country's capital city. It is dedicated to Anthony of Padua (Santo António de Lisboa in Portuguese). While the first church at this location was built around 1800, the current building dates back to 1955.

== History ==
Some of this section is translated from the existing German Wikipedia article at de:Santo António de Motael; see its history for attribution.

During the Portuguese colonial era, the district of Motael was the centre of Portuguese life in Dili. A church was first built at the present location around the year 1800, on land gifted by the liurai of "Mota-a in".

A reconstruction of the church was started around 1901. The completion date is unknown, but there are records of a completed church dating back to 1937. However, at that time the building did not have the bell tower and portico that it has today.

The building was partially destroyed by Japanese air raids during the Second World War. It was rebuilt in 1955, and served as the de facto cathedral for the diocese of Dili until the inauguration of the Immaculate Conception Cathedral in 1989.

In 1975, in the turmoil of the withdrawal of the Portuguese from Timor, some Fretilin members decided to go occupy the church, perceiving it as an icon of colonialism. However, just before they reached the building, their leader fell from the truck and broke his clavicle. The group interpreted this event as a divine intervention, and aborted the operation.

The church played an important role in the independence struggle. On 27 October 1991, young independence activists tried to demonstrate against the Indonesian occupation. While the Indonesian security forces ran after them, pastor Alberto Ricardo da Silva offered them protection in the church. At night, the Indonesians stormed the church and shot activist Sebastião Gomes, who then bled to death. On 12 November 1991, after the memorial service for Gomes, a demonstration started in front of the church and led to the Santa Cruz massacre, in which at least 271 people were killed by Indonesian security forces.

During the 2006 East Timorese crisis, as many as 500 people took refuge in the church.
