= Timorese Resistance Archive and Museum =

Museum in Dili, East Timor

- Resisência Timorense Arquivo e Museu
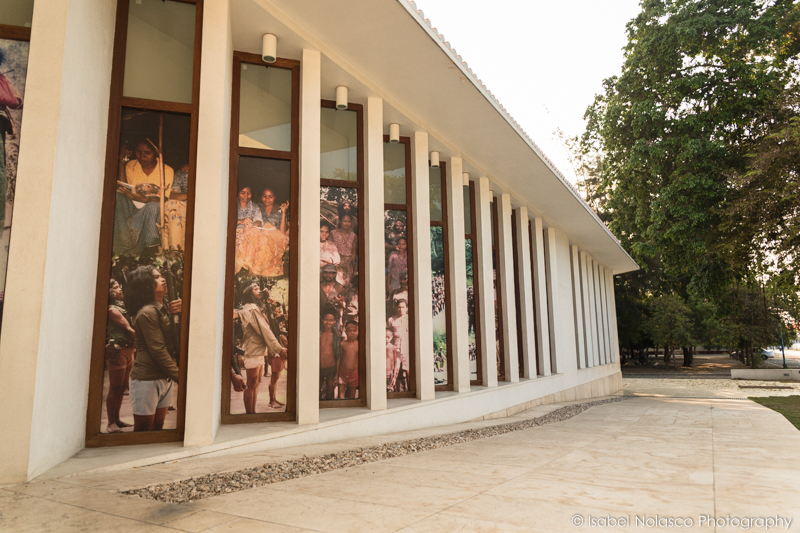
- Former name: Portuguese Timor Court of Justice
- Established: 7 December 2005
- Location: Dili, East Timor
- Coordinates: 8°33′20.1″S 125°34′39.2″E
- Type: museum
- Architect: Tânia Bettencourt Correia

The Timorese Resistance Archive and Museum (Portuguese: Arquivo e Museu da Resistência Timorense, Tetum: Arkivu & Muzeu Rezisténsia Timorense) is a museum in Dili, East Timor about the struggle for independence from Indonesia.

== History ==
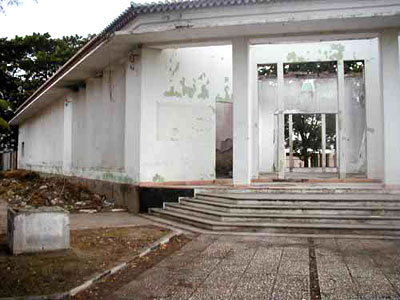
The former Portuguese court in Dili, destroyed in 1999, was restored and turned into the museum

The museum was opened on 7 December 2005. The inauguration ceremony was attended by Prime Minister Mari Alkatiri and President Xanana Gusmão.

== Architecture ==
The museum is housed in the former Portuguese Timor Court of Justice building which was burnt down during the 1999 East Timorese crisis. The building spans over an area of 1,325 m^{2} with a 1,165 m^{2} courtyard. The architect for the renovation of the building was Tânia Bettencourt Correia.

== Permanent exhibit ==
The main space of the AMRT is occupied by an exhibit entitled "To Resist is to Win," depicting the history of Timorese armed and clandestine resistance to Indonesian military rule. It aims to make the history of the resistance struggle better known, evoking its main moments and protagonists, using modern museological trends and, whenever possible, audio-visual sources. The exhibit is captioned in Tetum, Portuguese and English.

The museum also houses temporary exhibits on aspects of resistance movement history.

== Resistance archives ==
The AMRT stores a variety of textual, photographic and audio-visual materials on site. These holdings include the Max Stahl audiovisual collection which records the birth of the Nation of Timor Leste. In 2013, this collection of video tapes and photographs was inscribed by UNESCO on its Memory of the World international register, recognising its global importance.

In 2013, the Mario Soares Foundation developed an online portal sharing much of this archival material. As a result, the AMRT has the country's largest online archive.

== See also ==
- List of museums in East Timor
- National Archives of East Timor
