= Kamal Bamadhaj =

Malaysian human rights activist

Kamal Ahmed Bamadhaj
- Born: December 23, 1970; Kuala Lumpur, Malaysia
- Died: November 12, 1991 (aged 20); Dili, occupied East Timor, Indonesia
- Education: University of New South Wales
- Occupation: Human rights activist

Kamal Ahmed Bamadhaj (23 December 1970 – 12 November 1991) was a political science student and human rights activist, who was killed in the Dili Massacre in East Timor on November 12, 1991.

Of Malaysian and New Zealand parentage, he was the only foreign national to be killed when Indonesian troops opened fire on a funeral procession at the Santa Cruz cemetery in Dili. He attended the University of New South Wales in Sydney, Australia, and worked as an interpreter for Australian aid agencies working in East Timor.

== Killing ==
On 12 November 1991, Kamal was among those escorting the funeral procession of a teenager who had been killed by Indonesian police several days earlier. He stood at the front of the procession in an effort to shield other participants from potential attacks. The march was part of a broader demonstration in support of the Timorese population protesting against injustices. During the procession, the Indonesian military opened fire on the crowd. Human rights organizations later estimated that at least 250 people were killed, with many others wounded or reported missing. Kamal was shot multiple times in the attack. Although an International Red Cross ambulance attempted to transport him to a hospital, he was unable to receive medical treatment in time due to military roadblocks. Kamal eventually later died due to blood loss.

== Aftermath ==
The Indonesian military commander in East Timor, Sintong Panjaitan, who was removed from the post, later went to study in the United States. In 1994, Bamadhaj's mother, Helen Todd, sued Panjaitan for punitive damages in a US court. However, he dismissed the court's decision as 'a joke' and returned to Indonesia.

A 1999 film, called Punitive Damage, tells the story of Todd's legal battle.
