= List of museums in Timor-Leste =

Timor-Leste is home to a number of museums, including the Timorese Resistance Archive and Museum and Centro Nacional Chega! in Dili, the capital, and the Balibo Fort Veterans' Museum in Balibo, Bobonaro Municipality. Regional museums were established in four of Timor-Leste's municipalities in the early 2020s.

Plans for the creation of a national museum and cultural center have been in development since 2010. In 2022, Timor-Leste's parliament allocated US$2.2 million for the project.

== Museums ==
Institution	Location	Municipality	Opened	Ref.
Aileu Memorial Municipal Museum	Aileu	Aileu	2022	
Balibo Fort Veterans' Museum	Balibo	Bobonaro	2022	
Bobonaro Memorial Municipal Museum	Maliana	Bobonaro	2023	
Centro Nacional Chega!	Dili	Dili	2016	
Cova Lima Memorial Resistance Municipal Museum	Suai	Cova Lima	2021	
Dare Memorial Museum	Dare	Dili	2009	
Galeria Memória Viva	Dili	Dili	2022	
Timorese Resistance Archive and Museum	Dili	Dili	2005	
Xanana Gusmão Reading Room	Dili	Dili	2000	
Viqueque Memorial Municipal Museum	Kraras	Viqueque	2021	

== Defunct museums ==
- Provincial Museum of East Timor (1995–1999)

== See also ==
- Lists of museums
