= Tais =

Form of traditional weaving created by the women of East Timor

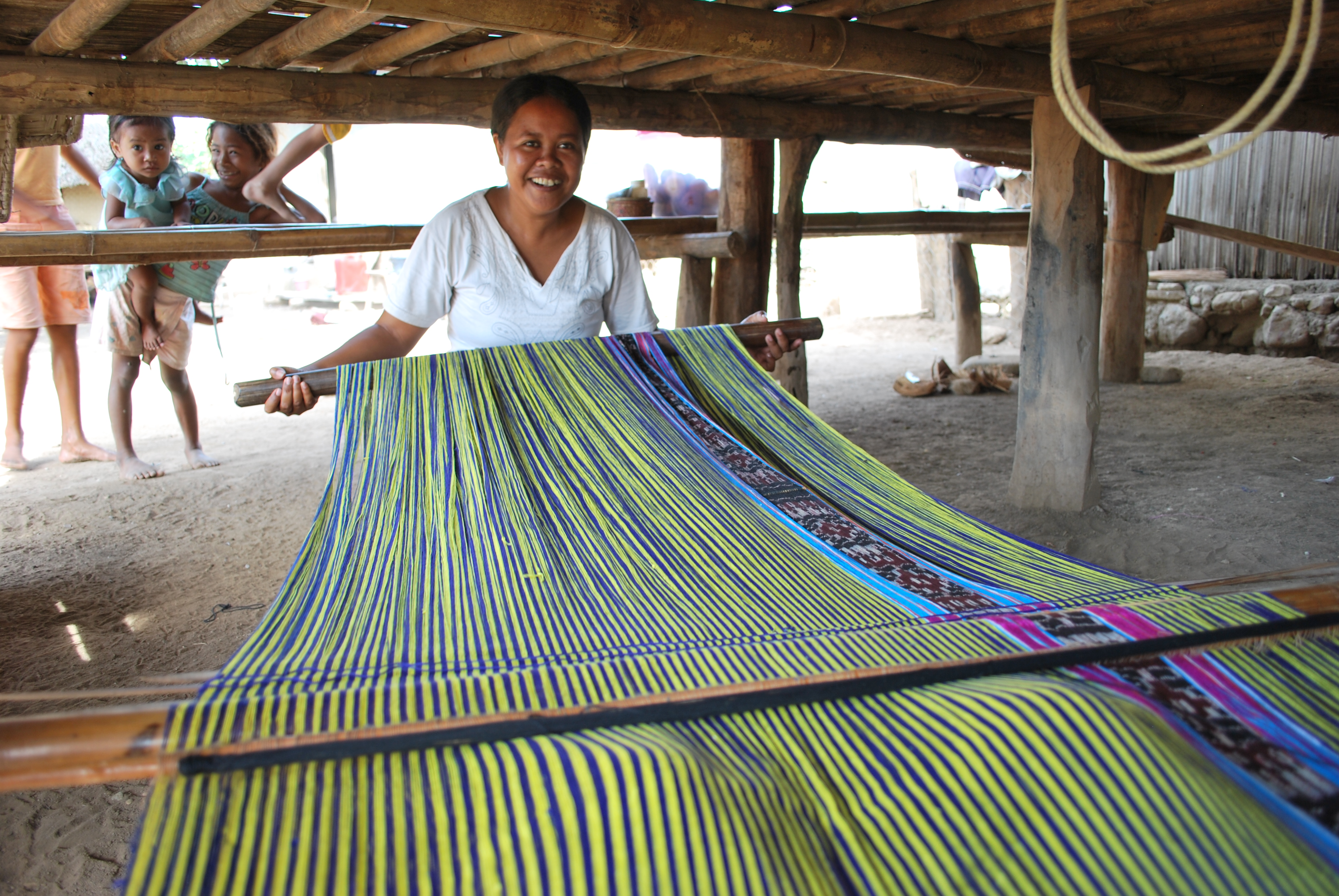
Woman in Cova Lima weaving tais in 2009

Tais cloth is a form of traditional weaving created by the women of East Timor. An essential part of the nation's cultural heritage, tais weavings are used for ceremonial adornment, sign of respect and appreciation towards guests, friends, relatives, home decor, and personal apparel. The Catholic Church of East Timor has also adopted the use of tais during its ceremonies. Because of the Indonesian occupation of East Timor, detailed study of the history and importance of the tais began only after 2000.

== History and social role ==
The tais has been used in East Timor as a unit of exchange, often for livestock or other valuables. In ceremonial use, the tais is usually worn along with feathers, coral, gold and/or silver. Still, the sale of tais has become common only in the last thirty years. Although small-scale commerce of tais is an important source of income for women, however, export is difficult and nearly all sales take place with foreigners. In recent years, the public textile market in the capital Dili has seen an influx of foreign-made weavings, which often look like tais and are sold (and made) more cheaply.

Weaving of tais is performed solely by women, with techniques passed down from generation to generation in an oral tradition. The activity often serves as a community gathering as much as a chore of productivity, and served as a rare form of self-expression in the restrictive environment of the 25-year Indonesian occupation.

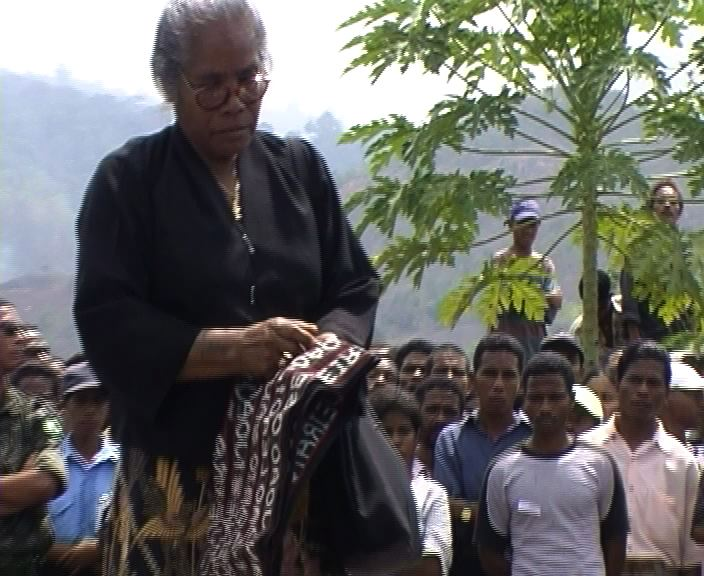
Tia Veronica Pereira weaves a special tais to commemorate the 1991 Santa Cruz Massacre

Tia Veronica Pereira created a black tais with the names of the 271 victims woven in red into it, to commemorate the victims of the 1991 Santa Cruz Massacre. The influence of textiles on the lives of women is reflected in the East Timorese expression "bringing a thread and bobbin" in reference to a newborn child.

During the occupation, Indonesian soldiers were a considerable market for tais weavers. In the 1970s, tais for the first time began to feature inscriptions, usually written in Indonesian. In the era of independence, tais artisans have begun specializing in customized weavings, as well as tais-like products such as handbags and scarves.

Since 1999 workers in NGO's and the UN bought tais to take home as gifts and mementos and new messages found their way into the tais in English and Portuguese as well as Tetun. A quite remarkable fact, given that most of the weavers are found in rural areas where they have not had the opportunity to learn how to read or write.

Many people wishing to assist East Timorese women develop income streams have imported tais for sale and assisted weavers and sewing groups to produce items such as purses, bags, cushion covers and baskets that are saleable in Australia and elsewhere. The selling of tais is rapidly moving off-shore as many of the people taking these initiatives belong to Local Government Friendship groups in Australia.

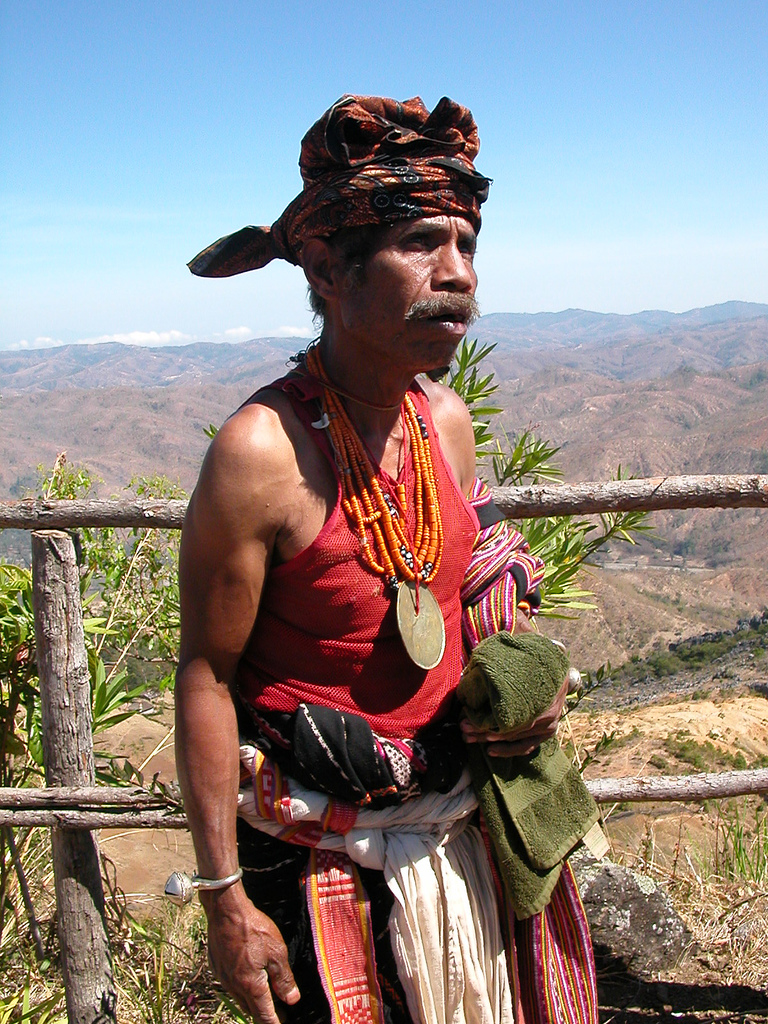
An East Timorese man in traditional attire, including tais mane

Traditional Timorese culture is supported by growing, cutting, tying, knotting, weaving, dying and sheathing a variety of fibres, grasses and leaves for ceremonial and practical purposes. The weaving of the tais plays an integral role in Timorese life and especially women's lives: shaping identity and attitudes towards them. Before the introduction of currency and after, the tais has been used as a valued object of exchange in gifting and ceremonies. Textiles are the art-form of the South-east Asian region and often the most beautiful tais are used to wrap around the bodies of loved ones for burial. Its role in wedding arrangements and the associated family ties, is attributed by some writers with contributing to the maintenance and strength of Timorese identity despite hundreds of years of colonial occupation. A Forum was recently held in Melbourne to stimulate and expand the debate and dialogue about the impact of commodifying the tais because it is a craft grounded in culture and sacred life.

== Designs ==
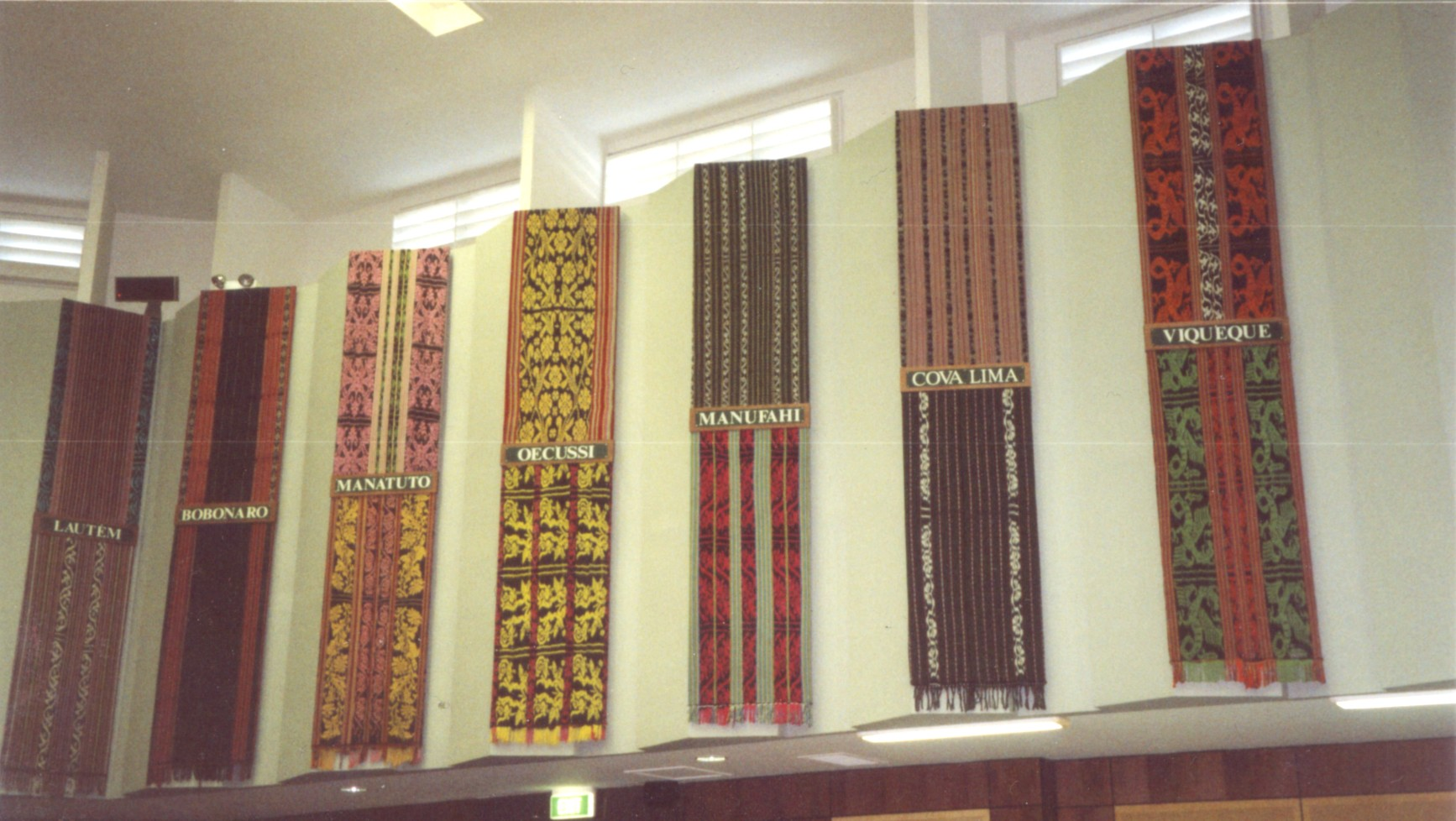
Tais in the National Parliament

The imagery and patterns of tais vary greatly from region to region, but they often include messages of locale and significant events. Imagery often includes animals such as the crocodile, upon which the creation legend of the island is based. Geometric patterns known as kaif are also employed in most tais.

Styles of tais worn on the body are differentiated by gender: men traditionally wear the tais mane (or "man's cloth"), a single large wrap around the waist usually finished with tassels. Women wear the tais feto ("women's cloth"), a form of strapless dress woven in the shape of a tube. A third type known as the selendang, a slender cloth worn around the neck, has become popular in recent years.

== Production ==
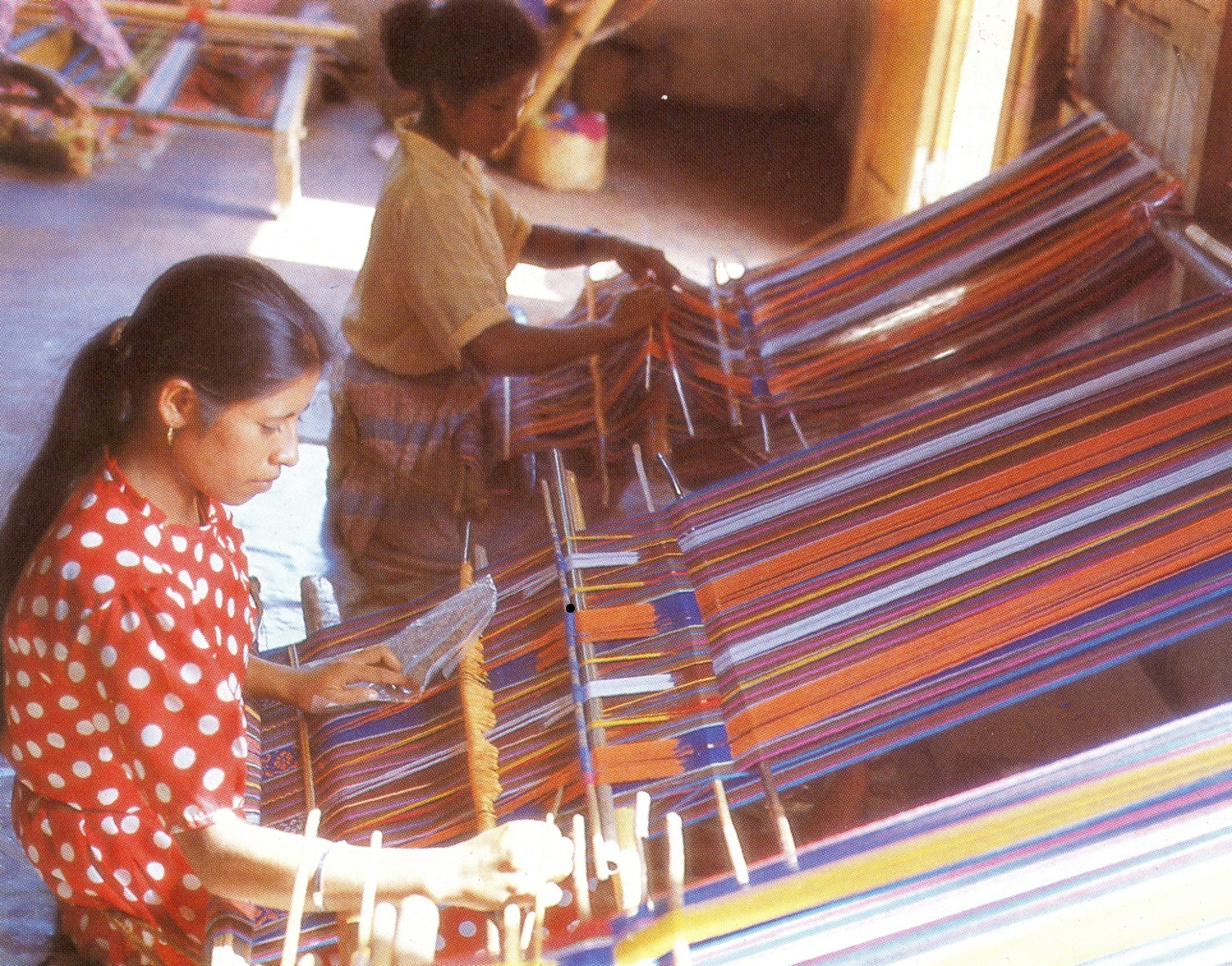
Women in Lospalos weaving tais in 1986

Using mostly cotton threads, the cloth is created during the island's dry season, almost entirely by hand. The use of cotton is a legacy of the Portuguese colonial era, when Timor was an important port for the trade in the material. Synthetic fibers like rayon, acrylic and polyester are becoming more common as they are imported more cheaply into East Timor. A single tais can take anywhere from several days to a year, depending on the complexity of design and variety of colors used.

Dyes are used to create bright colors in the tais; these are mixed from plants like taun, kinur, and teka. Other dyes are derived from mango skin, potato leaf, cactus flowers, and turmeric. Individuals skilled in mixing dyes are sometimes compared to alchemists, using traditional recipes for creating desired colors. Although colors carry different associations from village to village, red is often used predominantly, as it is connected to long life and courage, in addition to being the base of the East Timorese flag. When the United Nations became the administering power in East Timor from 1999–2002, tais markets increased production of blue fabrics to match that organization's trademark flag.

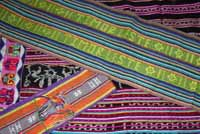
A collection of tais from around East Timor, 2003

One of the most common tools for tais weaving is the back-strap loom, which allows tension on the cloth while the warp is manipulated. The pressure from the strap and the time required for the intricate designs on many tais produce significant pain for many women. During the 1999 wave of violence known in East Timor as "Black September", many tais weavers saw their tools and equipment stolen or destroyed. Recent years have also seen a decline in the number of young women learning traditional methods of tais weaving.

== Regional variations ==
Designs, colors, and styles of tais production vary greatly in each of East Timor's thirteen districts. In the enclave of Oecussi-Ambeno, Portuguese influence is most apparent, with floral and religious imagery predominating alongside subdued shades of black, orange, and yellow. In the capital city Dili, by contrast, bright colors and solid panels reflect the focus on tais commerce.

In the district of Ermera, black-and-white designs are most common, reflecting the royalty of the traditional leaders, who often lived in the area. The village of Manufahi produces tais with certain common animal themes, specifically the lizard and pig.

== Bibliography ==
- Hamilton, Roy W; Barrkman, Joanna, eds. (2014). Textiles of Timor: Island in The Woven Sea. Fowler Museum textile series, 13. Los Angeles: Fowler Museum at UCLA. ISBN 9780984755080.
- Pride, Natali. "Weaving the Country Together: Identities and Traditions in East Timor". Dissertation, University of New South Wales: 2002. Online at East Timor Law Journal. Retrieved 7 February 2008.
