= Cuisine of Timor-Leste =

Culinary traditions of East Timor

The Cuisine of Timor-Leste consists of regional popular foods such as pork, fish, basil, tamarind, legumes, maize, rice, root vegetables, and tropical fruit. The Cuisine of Timor-Leste is highly influenced by the Malay and Portuguese from historic periods of colonization, immigration etc. Flavors and ingredients from other former Portuguese colonies can be found due to the presence of Portuguese soldiers from other colonies in Timor-Leste.

== East Timorese dishes ==
As agriculture is the main occupation in Timor-Leste, the primary food is rice, which is cultivated widely in this country. Apart from rice, other staple food items that are cultivated in Timor-Leste include sweet potatoes, maize, cassava, and taro. These primary staples are supplemented with beans, cabbage, spinach, onions and cowpeas.

The second category of food consists of poultry, pigs, and goats. Most homes in Timor-Leste domesticate their own animals. Fish is also a source of animal protein in this country as fishing is also an important occupation in Timor-Leste.

- Batar daan - A popular dish of corn, mung beans, and pumpkin.
- Budu - A sauce of tomato, mint, lime, and Spanish onion.
- Fuuntaul tong and gailong - A popular soup dish, red beans, beef, lettuce, and egg with rice.

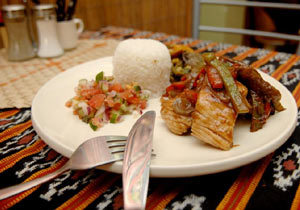
An East Timorese dish of ikan sabuko with batar daan, rice and budu.

- Ikan sabuko - A Spanish mackerel in tamarind marinade with basil and capsicum.
- Tapai - A fermented rice dish. It is sweet, sour, and slightly alcoholic.
- Caril - A mild chicken curry with a roasted capsicum and coconut paste.
- Feijoada – A common dish of former Portuguese colonies, it is made with pork, cannellini beans and chorizo.

== Hungry season ==
Timor-Leste's crops rely on the rains that come following the annual dry season. This leads to a period of poor food security called the "hungry season" from November to February due to the unpredictable climate. Many households depend on their own production of food because of the erratic climate conditions, such as droughts.

Many families subsist on akar, which is a widely available food source for the poor. It is dried palm tree bark, beaten into a powder, mixed with water to form a jelly and then cooked over fire. This leads to cases where nearly 58% of children under the age of five suffer from chronic malnutrition.

== Desserts ==
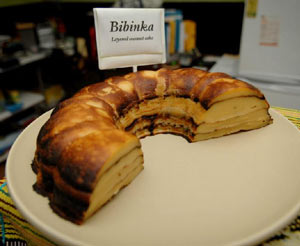
Bibinka - a grilled and layered coconut cake.

- Bibingka - A grilled and layered coconut cake
- Portuguese tart (pastel de nata) - an egg tart pastry

== Coffee ==
Coffee is a major cash crop for the island nation, accounting for 90 percent of its non-oil exports, while 46 percent of East Timorese households rely solely on coffee for their income.

The crop has grown in the country for centuries. It accounted for half of the country's trade when it was a Portuguese colony in the late 1800s, but during 24 years of Indonesian occupation the bumper business was neglected when the military took over – prices fluctuated and many coffee plantations were battlefields so the quality of beans worsened.

By the war's end, agricultural experts estimated two generation's worth of farming knowledge was lost and some plantations were abandoned. But because the trees got little attention the pesticide and fertiliser-free groves are popular for organic coffee lovers. Today, the coffee is known as the golden prince of Timor-Leste agriculture - worth $10 million a year, 46,000 coffee farms employ one-fifth of Timor-Leste's population but it is a major battle to encourage farmers to improve the quality of Timor-Leste's agriculture.

== See also ==
- Australian cuisine
- Indonesian cuisine
