= Fernando Sylvan =

East Timorese writer

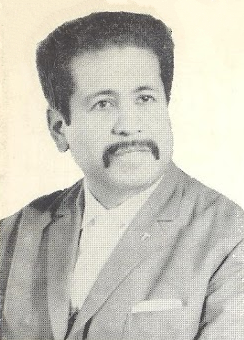
- Sylvan in 1965
- Born: 26 August 1917; Díli, Portuguese Timor
- Died: 25 December 1993 (aged 76); Cascais, Portugal
- Title: President of the Sociedade de Língua Portuguesa

Fernando Sylvan (26 August 1917—25 December 1993) was a Timorese-Portuguese poet and writer.

He was born in Díli, modern-day Timor-Leste—at the time a part of the Portuguese Timor colony—on 26 August 1917. He then spent almost all his life in Portugal, while writing about Timorese traditions and folklore. He is considered among the greatest writers in Portuguese and he was a member and the president of the Sociedade de Língua Portuguesa. He died in Cascais, Portugal, on 25 December 1993.
