= Santa Cruz massacre =

1991 massacre in Indonesian-occupied East Timor

- Part of the East Timor genocide during the Indonesian occupation of East Timor
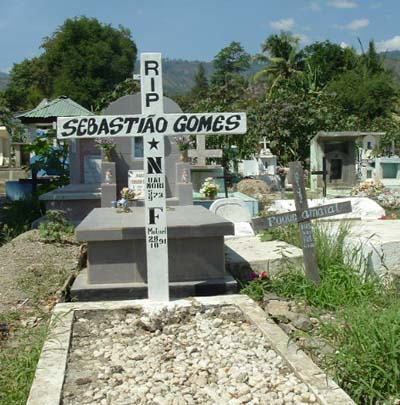
- The Santa Cruz massacre took place during a 1991 funeral procession to the grave of Sebastião Gomes.
- Location: 08°33′47″S 125°35′12″E; Santa Cruz cemetery, Dili
- Date: 12 November 1991; 35 years ago (UTC+9)
- Target: East Timorese
- Attack type: Massacre
- Deaths: ~250 or 271
- Perpetrator: Indonesian Army
- Motive: Political repression

The Santa Cruz massacre (also known as the Dili massacre) was the murder of at least 250 East Timorese pro-independence demonstrators in the Santa Cruz cemetery in the capital, Dili, on 12 November 1991, during the Indonesian occupation of East Timor and is part of the East Timor genocide.

== Background ==
In October 1991, a delegation to East Timor consisting of members of the Assembly of the Republic of Portugal and twelve journalists was planned during a visit from UN Special Rapporteur for Human Rights on Torture, Pieter Kooijmans. The Indonesian regime objected to the inclusion in the delegation of Jill Jolliffe, an Australian journalist who it regarded as supportive of the Fretilin independence movement, and Portugal subsequently cancelled the delegation. The cancellation demoralised independence activists in East Timor, who had hoped to use the visit to raise the international profile of their cause. Tension between Indonesian authorities and East Timorese youths rose in the days after Portugal's cancellation. On 28 October, Indonesian troops had located a group of resistance members in Dili's Motael Church. A confrontation ensued between pro-integration activists and those in the church; when it was over, one man on each side was dead. Sebastião Gomes, a supporter of independence for East Timor, was taken out of the church and shot by Indonesian troops, and integration activist Afonso Henriques was stabbed and killed during the fight.

Foreigners who had come to East Timor to observe the Portuguese delegation included independent US journalists Amy Goodman and Allan Nairn, and British cameraman Max Stahl. They attended a memorial service for Gomes on 12 November, during which several thousand men, women, and children walked from the Motael Church to the nearby Santa Cruz cemetery. Along the way, members of the group pulled out banners and East Timorese flags. Organizers of the protest maintained order during the protest; although it was loud, the crowd was peaceful and orderly, by most accounts. It was the largest and most visible demonstration against the Indonesian occupation since 1975.

== The massacre ==
During a brief confrontation between Indonesian troops and protesters, some protesters and a major, Geerhan Lantara were stabbed. Stahl claimed Lantara had attacked a group of protesters including a girl carrying the flag of East Timor, and Fretilin activist Constâncio Pinto reported witness accounts of beatings from Indonesian soldiers and police. When the procession entered the cemetery some continued their protests before the cemetery wall. Around 200 more Indonesian soldiers arrived and advanced on the gathering, weapons drawn. In the graveyard, they opened fire on hundreds of unarmed civilians. At least 250 East Timorese were killed in the massacre. One of the dead was a New Zealander, Kamal Bamadhaj, a political science student and human rights activist based in Australia.

The massacre was witnessed by the two American journalists—Amy Goodman and Allan Nairn—and caught on videotape by Max Stahl, who was filming undercover for Yorkshire Television. As Stahl filmed the massacre, Goodman and Nairn tried to "serve as a shield for the Timorese" by standing between them and the Indonesian soldiers. The soldiers began beating Goodman, and when Nairn moved to protect her, they beat him with their weapons, fracturing his skull. The camera crew managed to smuggle the video footage to Australia. They gave it to Saskia Kouwenberg, a Dutch journalist, to prevent it being seized and confiscated by Australian authorities, who subjected the camera crew to a strip-search when they arrived in Darwin, having been tipped off by Indonesia. The video footage was used in the First Tuesday documentary In Cold Blood: The Massacre of East Timor, shown on ITV in the UK in January 1992, as well as numerous other, more recent documentaries. Stahl's footage, combined with the testimony of Nairn and Goodman and others, caused outrage around the world. The program In Cold Blood: The Massacre of East Timor was the overall winner at the inaugural Amnesty International UK Media Awards in 1992.

Indonesian authorities described the incident as a spontaneous reaction to violence from the protesters or a "misunderstanding". Objectors cited two factors: the documented history of mass violence committed by Indonesian troops in places such as Quelicai, Lacluta, and Kraras, and a series of statements from politicians and officers in Indonesia, justifying the military's violence. Try Sutrisno, Commander-in-Chief of the Indonesian forces, said two days after the massacre: "The army cannot be underestimated. Finally we had to shoot them. Delinquents like these agitators must be shot, and they will be."

== Aftermath ==
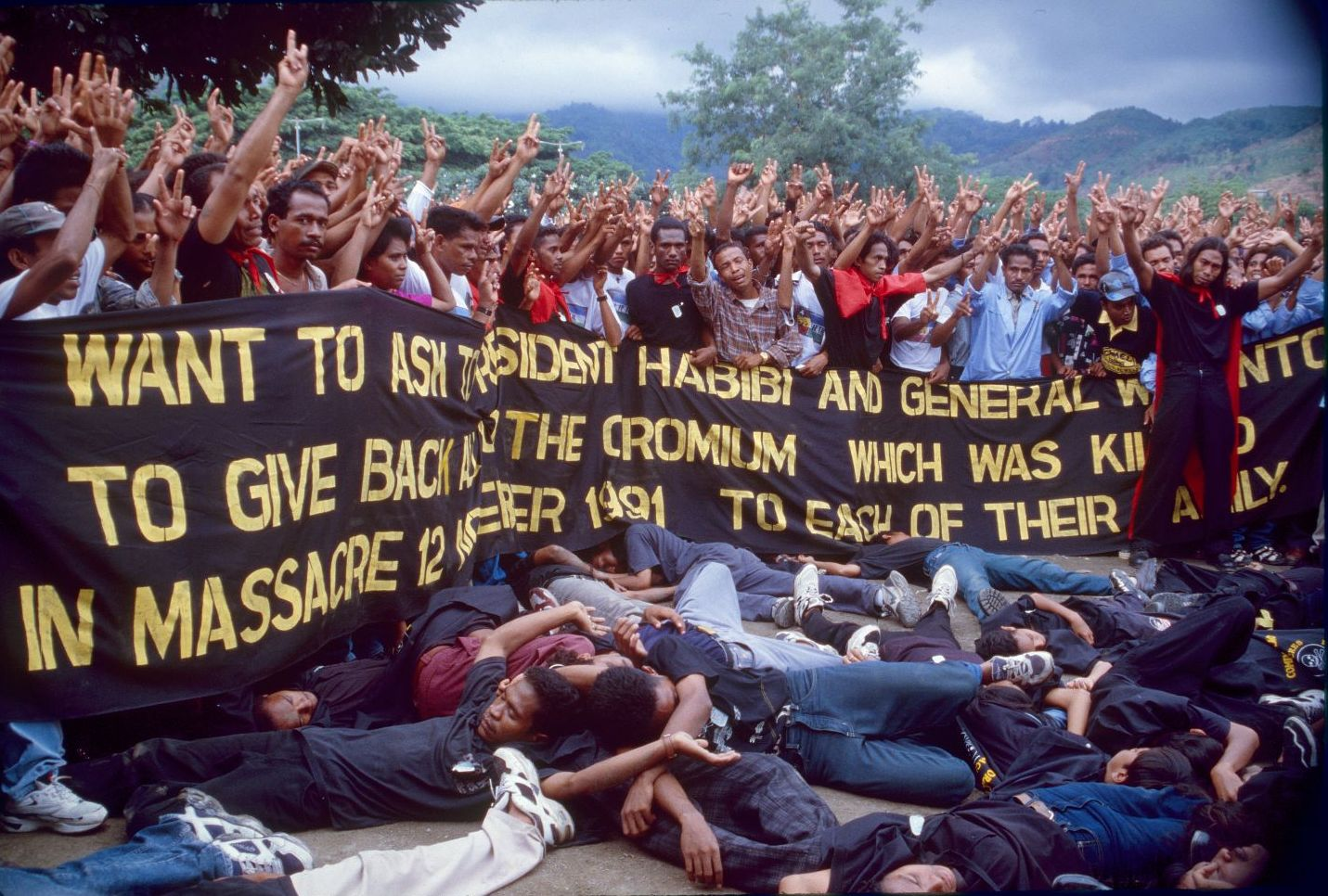
A re-enactment of the Santa Cruz massacre, November 1998.

In response to the massacre, activists around the world organised in solidarity with the East Timorese. Although a small network of individuals and groups had been working for human rights and self-determination in East Timor since the occupation began, their activity took on a new urgency after the 1991 massacre. TAPOL, a British organisation formed in 1973 to advocate for democracy in Indonesia, increased its work around East Timor. In the United States, the East Timor Action Network was founded and soon had chapters in ten cities around the country. Other solidarity groups appeared in Portugal, Australia, Japan, Germany, Malaysia, Ireland, and Brazil.

The television pictures of the massacre were shown worldwide, causing the Indonesian government considerable embarrassment. The coverage was a vivid example of how growth of new media in Indonesia was making it increasingly difficult for the "New Order" to control information flow in and out of Indonesia, and that in the post-Cold War 1990s, the government was coming under increasing international scrutiny. Copies of the Santa Cruz footage were distributed back into Indonesia allowing more Indonesians to see the actions of their government uncensored. A number of pro-democracy student groups and their magazines began to openly and critically discuss not just East Timor, but also the "New Order" and the broader history and future of Indonesia.

The US Congress voted to cut off funding for IMET training of Indonesian military personnel although arms sales continued from the US to the Indonesian National Armed Forces. President Clinton cut off all US military ties with the Indonesian military in 1999. By 2005, the US had resumed training and co-operation and by 2012 President Obama had increased military financial aid to US$1.56 billion and approved the resumption of direct US military training of Indonesian special forces.

The massacre prompted the Portuguese government to increase its diplomatic campaign. Portugal unsuccessfully tried to apply pressure by raising the issue with its fellow European Union members in their dealings with Indonesia. However, other EU countries such as the UK had close economic relations with Indonesia, including arms sales, and were reluctant to jeopardise these. An Australian organisation called the Alice Springs Friends of East Timor was established after the massacre.

In Australia, there was criticism of the federal government's recognition of Jakarta's sovereignty over East Timor. The government had been promoting increased ties with the Indonesian military at the time of the massacre, but in 1999 temporarily cut off military ties in response to the violence after that year's independence referendum. Australian foreign minister Gareth Evans described the killings as "an aberration, not an act of state policy".

The 12 November is now commemorated as a national youth day, a public holiday in Timor-Leste to honor contribution of the youth in their fight for independence.

== See also ==
- Biak massacre
- History of Timor-Leste
- List of massacres in Timor-Leste
- Pro-Indonesia militia
- 2025 Timor-Leste protests
