= Mutisalah =

Southeast Asian heirloom beads

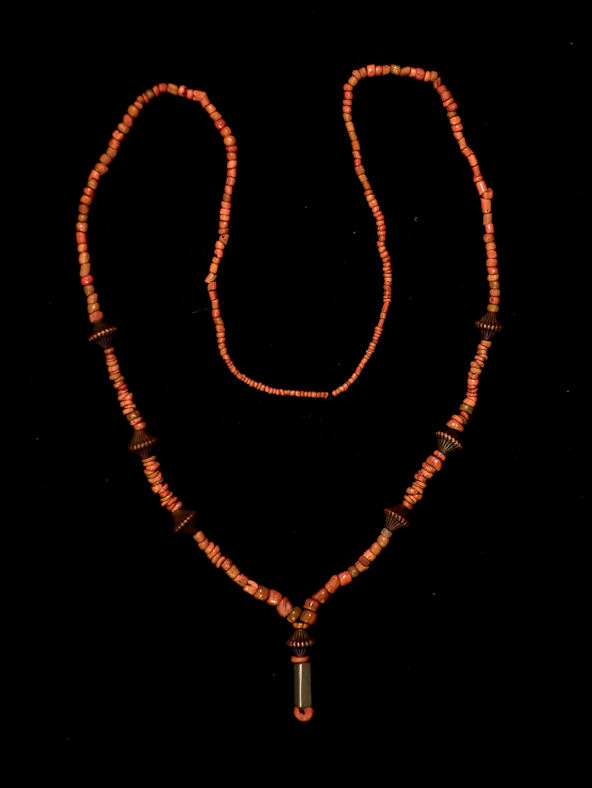
Mutisalah beaded necklace

The term mutisalah refers to heirloom beads in the Lesser Sunda Islands of Timor, Flores, Sumba and Savu. Mutisalah are also found in the Philippines and Borneo. Mutisalah were originally Indo-Pacific beads of orange and orange-red color. The earliest of these beads came from Southern India and have been dated as early as 200 BC. Their manufacture spread to other centers.

In the 9th-century Buddhist Sailendra dynasty, drawn Indo-Pacific beads, now called mutisalah, were produced by the Sumatran Srivijaya empire These beads were traded into Borneo, Java and to the eastern Indonesian islands until the 13th century. Nieuwenhuis, whose observations date from the turn of the century, reports that the reddish-brown beads, known in the Timor archipelago as mutisalah, and which also occur in South Sumatra, were brought from the Lampong Districts to Timor, where they yielded a high price. Likewise, inhabitants of Kroé in Benkulen travelled from Sumatra to the west coast of Borneo and traversed the island to sell their ancient beads profitably to the Bahau and other tribes. Archeological evidence from 1000 to 1200 AD shows that this type of bead predominated. From the 13th century they are much less common. Chinese-made beads came into use after the defeat of the Srivajaya Kingdom and it is postulated that the Chinese traders took advantage of the scarcity that was a consequence of the changed trade patterns. Chinese coil beads became common in Sumatra, Java and Borneo after the 12th century, but there is little evidence of Chinese trade with the Nusa Tenggara Timur until the Ming dynasty.

== Distribution ==
Mutisalah are found and still treasured as heirloom beads, or beads declaring status and wealth in Sumba, Flores and Timor. They are also in use in Borneo. Mutisalah are found in Sumatra, but there they do not seem to have the same heirloom status. In the Philippines, mutisalah have been found in grave sites from between 100 BC and 500 AD that are known to have been manufactured in Arikamedu, South India. There is little evidence that they came through direct trade, rather they probably changed hands several times before reaching the Philippines.

== Classification ==
There are two classes of mutisalah. One, the Mutiraja, is owned (and touched) only by royalty. They are reddish-brown or orange, shiny, and heavy in weight. That is, they are the lead-glass Chinese "coil" beads. The mutiraja used all over Nusa Tenggara Timur are usually quite small. There are larger mutiraja from 1.5–3 mm (0.059–0.118 in) in diameter which are found only on Sumba and are very rare. The other class is known as mutibatta (orange) or Mutitanah (red-brown). They are larger than Mutiraja, dull in luster, and not as heavy. These are drawn Indo-Pacific beads and are the beads of the commoners.

== Value ==
In the eastern islands today, mutisalah are saved as heirlooms. The beads are valued differently by cultures on the various islands. In Sumba, Mutiraja are owned (and touched) only by royalty. Mutiraja are worn as necklaces by young princesses, and after marriage, as bracelets, anklets, and rings (in the old days they were also sewn onto clothes). The bride's family gives them to the groom in exchange for 50 to 100 carabao (water buffalo) or horses and some gold. The bride, however, wears the beads and passes them on to her daughter.

In Timor, in 1965, a 12-inch long strand of mutisalah equaled the price of a water buffalo. In the 1970s, some mutisalah which originated from sites in Sumatra were being exchanged for precious textiles by Haji Baharudin who then sold the textiles to collectors in Japan and the US.

== Uses ==
In Sumba, mutiraja beads are worn by royalty on special occasions, but if the royal family does not wish to attend some ceremony, they send a servant bedecked with the beads. The servant wears either a Kahanga Hupu, a single strand around the neck and four long strands reaching to the ground terminated with gold coins, or a Papiarang which is similar but a double strand.

In Flores, mutisalah may be owned only by the chieftain and are displayed on ceremonial occasions. Common people are forbidden to wear them.

In Borneo, among the Maloh people, beads are tied to the wrists of a couple at marriage, and when a new communal house is built, beads are placed in the holes dug for the main posts of the structure. The Kelabit people call mutisalah "head of the ghost", affixing two of them to the end of a sharpened stick that was placed in the ground near a rice field to ensure a bountiful harvest.
