= Portuguese Timor =

1702–1975 Portuguese colony in Southeast Asia

Coordinates: 8°33′17″S 125°34′43″E

Portuguese Timor Timor Português
- 1702–1975
- Flag (1910–1942; 1945–1975) Coat of arms (1951–1975)
- Anthem: "Hymno Patriótico" (1808–26); Patriotic Anthem "Hino da Carta" (1826–1910); Hymn of the Charter "A Portuguesa" (1910–1975); The Portuguese [Song]
- Portuguese Timor with 1869-established boundaries.
- Status: Colony of the Portuguese Empire; Occupied by the Japanese Empire (1942–1945)
- Capital: Lifau (1702–69); Dili (1769–1942; 1945–75)
- Common languages: Tetum, Portuguese, Indonesian
- Religion: Catholicism
- Head of state
  - Monarch 1702–06: Peter II (first)
  - 1908–10: Manuel II (last)
  - President 1910–11: Teófilo Braga (first)
  - 1974–75/76: Francisco da Costa Gomes (last de facto)
- Governor
  - 1702–05: António Coelho Guerreiro (first)
  - 1974–75: Mário Lemos Pires (last)
- History
  - Establishment: 1702
  - Japanese occupation of Portuguese Timor: 1942–45
  - Unilateral declaration of independence by Fretilin: 28 November 1975
  - Invasion by Indonesia: 7 December 1975
  - Independence achieved from Indonesia: 20 May 2002

Area
  - Total: 14,874 km^{2} (5,743 sq mi)
- Currency: Timorese pataca (PTP); Timorese escudo (PTE)
- ISO 3166 code: TP
Preceded by	Succeeded by
Pre-colonial Timor	East Timor (1975–1976); Indonesian occupied East Timor
- Today part of: Timor-Leste

Portuguese Timor (Portuguese: Timor Português) was a Portuguese colony on the territory of present-day Timor-Leste from 1702 until 1975. During most of this period, Portugal shared the island of Timor with the Dutch East Indies (now Indonesia).

The first Europeans to arrive in the region were the Portuguese in 1515. Dominican friars established a presence on the island in 1556, and the territory was declared a Portuguese colony in 1702. Following the beginning of the Carnation Revolution (a Lisbon-instigated decolonisation process) in 1975, a civil war broke out and then East Timor was invaded by Indonesia. However, the invasion was not recognised as legal by the United Nations (UN), which continued to regard Portugal as the legal Administering Power of East Timor. The independence of East Timor was finally achieved in 2002 following a UN-administered transition period.

== History ==
=== Early Europeans ===
Prior to the arrival of European colonial powers, the island of Timor was part of the trading networks that stretched between India and China and incorporating Maritime Southeast Asia. The island's large stands of fragrant sandalwood were its main commodity. It was sandalwood that attracted European explorers to the island in the early sixteenth century, and early European presence was limited to trade. The first European powers to arrive in the area were the Portuguese in the early sixteenth century followed by the Dutch in the late sixteenth century. Both came in search of the fabled Spice Islands of Maluku. In 1515, the Portuguese first landed near modern Pante Macassar. Dutch and Portuguese sources relate that the island was divided into two collections of kingdoms. Around sixteen kingdoms were grouped into Servião in the west, while in the east around fifty kingdoms were part of Belos.

In 1556 a group of Dominican friars established the village of Lifau. Trade was controlled by Portuguese settlements on other Lesser Sunda Islands. The first Portuguese settlement in the area was set up on the nearby island of Solor in the 1560s. Due to the lack of direct Portuguese control in the area, with limited support from both Malacca and Goa, the sandalwood trade fell under the control of the Dominican missionaries. These exports were crucial for the prosperity of Macau. Despite the early presence of Dominican missionaries, the missionaries struggled to convert the native inhabitants. Even after the local rulers declared themselves as Christians, adoption of Christianity by the masses was not widespread, and conversions were mostly superficial. As late as 1941, Christians were still few in number.

In 1613, the Dutch took control of the western part of the island. Over the following three centuries, the Dutch would come to dominate the Indonesian archipelago with the exception of the eastern half of Timor, which would become Portuguese Timor. In 1605 Ambon and Tidore passed to Dutch control, and the following year Ternate was ceded to Spain (before later coming under Dutch control in 1663). Solor was also lost in 1613, leading the Portuguese capital to move to Flores. In 1621 the Banda Islands fell to the Dutch, before Malacca fell in 1641, and Solor shortly afterwards in 1646. The fall of Solor led the Portuguese capital to be moved to Kupang on Timor's west, before that was lost again to the Dutch in 1652. Only then did the Portuguese move to Lifau in what is now East Timor's Oecusse exclave. The Portuguese had engaged with Lifau recently, having sent forces in 1641 to aid the Queen of Lifau/Ambeno.

The Portuguese introduced maize as a food crop and coffee as an export crop. Timorese systems of tax and labour control were preserved, through which taxes were paid through their labour and a portion of the coffee and sandalwood crop. The Portuguese introduced mercenaries into Timorese communities and Timorese chiefs hired Portuguese soldiers for wars against neighbouring tribes. With the use of the Portuguese musket, Timorese men became deer hunters and suppliers of deer horn and hide for export.

The Portuguese introduced Catholicism to Portuguese Timor, as well as the Latin writing system, the printing press, and formal schooling. Two groups of people were introduced to East Timor: Portuguese men, and Topasses (Larantuqueiros). The Portuguese language was introduced into church and state business, and Portuguese Asians used Malay in addition to Portuguese. Under colonial policy, Portuguese citizenship was available to men who assimilated the Portuguese language, literacy, and religion; by 1970, 1,200 East Timorese, largely drawn from the aristocracy, Dili residents, or larger towns, had obtained Portuguese citizenship. By the end of the colonial administration in 1974, 30 percent of Timorese were practising Catholics while the majority continued to worship spirits of the land and sky.

=== Establishment of Portuguese Timor ===
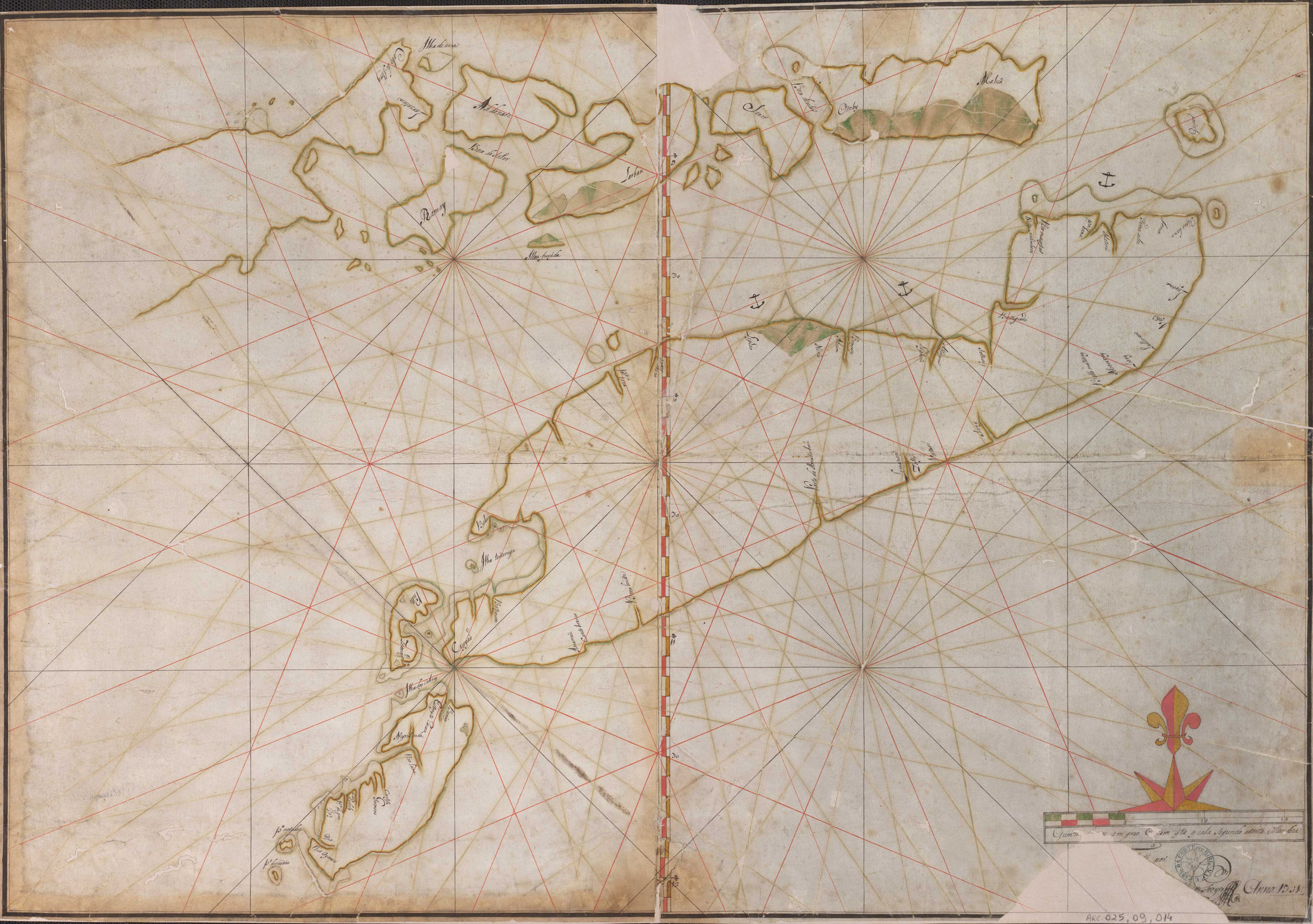
1731 Portuguese map of Timor.

In 1702, António Coelho Guerreiro was appointed Governor and Captain General of the islands of Timor and Solor and other regions in the South by Caetano de Melo e Castro, the Viceroy of Goa, ending the autonomy of the Dominican missions. He was sent to Lifau, which became the capital of all Portuguese dependencies in the Lesser Sunda Islands. (The former capitals were Solor and Larantuka.) Portuguese control over the territory was tenuous, particularly in the mountainous interior. Dominican friars, the occasional Dutch raid, and the Timorese themselves, competed with Portuguese merchants. Other disruptions came from the local Topasses, restive vassal kingdoms, and the south Sulawesi-based Gowa and Talloq sultanates. The control of colonial administrators was largely restricted to the Dili area, and they had to rely on traditional tribal chieftains for control and influence. Direct European presence was limited to a handful of individuals, and only one or two ships made the trip between Lifau and Macau each year. This weakness allowed the Dutch East India Company (VOC) to establish influence in the area despite Portugal's claims.

In 1716 the Viceroy of Macau, César de meneses, banned the sale of Timorese sandalwood to non-Portuguese areas, creating tension with the Topasses. In 1718 governor Francisco de Melo e Castro was excommunicated by bishop Manuel de Santo António, leading the governor to flee, the bishop to take over. This buildup of tension following more direct rule led to the leaders of some local kingdoms meeting in the kingdom of Camenassa on the southern coast, coming to an agreement to throw off Portuguese authority. A renewal of this rebellion in 1725 led to a campaign by Portuguese forces and allies from the north coast. The rebellion included 15 kingdoms, including Oecusse and Ermera. This culminated in the October 1726 Battle of Cailaco, in which the Portuguese laid siege to a Timorese stronghold for six weeks. The Portuguese destroyed the fort, although they did not entirely suppress the revolt until 1728.

In 1732 the Kingdom of Maubara asked the VOC for protection, although it is unclear if an agreement was reached, and the kingdom continued to pay tribute to Portugal. In 1755 the Dutch began a concerted effort to increase their influence in Solor and Timor, and in June 1756 nobles from 77 polities signed contracts with the VOC representative in Kupang, including Maubara. A permanent fort, Fort Maubara, established with VOC support, created friction with the Portuguese. Portuguese allies in the east of the island attacked Maubara at Portuguese behest in 1760, but were repulsed with aid from the VOC.

A power struggle in Lifau at this time involving Portuguese officials and Topasse leaders also saw attempted interference by the VOC representative in Kupang, who travelled to Lifau but was killed there. The new VOC Governor shifted focus back to the western parts of Timor.

=== Establishment of Dili as capital of Portuguese Timor ===
Flag and coat of arms of Portuguese Dili (1952–1975). The inscription reads: "That Which the Sun Sees First Upon Rising".

Continuing struggles led to the killing of Portuguese Governor Dionísio Gonçalves Rebelo Galvão in Lifau in 1766. Shortly after, Portuguese administration shifted East, when Governor António José Teles de Meneses moved to the Kingdom of Motael due to the Topasse threat. This 1769 founding of the city of Dili was the first effective European occupation in the east of the island. This shift was accompanied by renewed relations between Portugal and more Eastern kingdoms, and control in Maubara became again contested.

The sandalwood trade proved highly profitable, although Portugal was unable to establish a desired monopoly. Instead, the harvesting and trade of sandalwood was uncontrolled. The lack of Portuguese authority outside of Dili left harvesting under the control of local rulers, and no cooperation was sought by Portugal from these local rulers. There was also little cooperation from the local population, many of whom believed sandalwood trees were home to spirits. Nonetheless, the wood became so important to the colony that it could be used to pay taxes. The lack of control meant that sandalwood forests were not maintained, and as they disappeared throughout the 18th century the sandalwood trade declined. Imports at Macau become mixed in with sandalwood from other export markets, such as Hawaii, Fiji, and the Marquesas Islands. António de Mendonça Côrte-Real, Governor from 1807 to 1810, blamed a failure to harvest on local conflicts and the seizure of trading ships by the English.

The Napoleonic Wars in the early 1800s saw Dutch and Portuguese influence weaken again, as Portugal saw its shipping interrupted and Dutch territories in the area were occupied by the British forces. However, local authorities for both continued to contest control on Timor. This period saw Dutch claims to Maubara win out. When the Dutch regained control of their territories in 1816, cash crops such as coffee and tea were spread, including to Maubara, where coffee grew well. Direct control however remained limited to non-existent.

A fire in Dili destroyed the existing records of the colony in 1799. New instructions were issued by the Viceroy in Goa on 5 April 1811, to deal with the "decadent and abandoned state of the island of Timor". In 1815, a new Governor, José Pinto Alcoforado de Azevedo e Sousa, began to promote the cultivation of coffee, and to a lesser extent sugar cane and cotton.

=== Detachment of Portuguese Timor from Portuguese India ===
In 1844 Timor, along with Macau, become administratively separated from Goa. In 1866 Timor was placed under the control of Macau, and officially divided into 11 districts. Effective control however remained with local rulers throughout this period, and development remained limited to Dili. Coffee production continued to expand, becoming especially prominent in the north coast near Dili, such as in Liquiçá, Motael, and Hatulia.

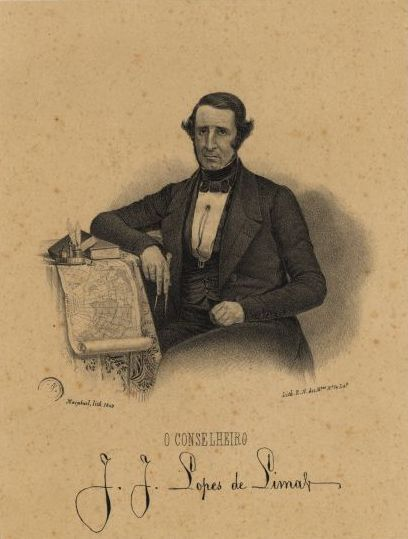
Portuguese Governor José Joaquim Lopes de Lima, who without authorisation agreed on new borders with Dutch authorities.

Conflicts with the Dutch continued throughout this period, entwined with shifting loyalties of local rulers. This led to three treaties being signed to define the border, in 1851, 1854, and 1859. Through these, Portugal ceded its remaining territory and claims on Flores and the Solor islands, while the Netherlands ceded Maubara and Citrana to Portugal, and dropped its claim on Atauro. The 1851 treaty which included these territorial arrangements was initiated by Portuguese Governor José Joaquim Lopes de Lima, who sought negotiations with officials in Kupang and Batavia shortly after his arrival to Timor in 1851. This was done without consulting authorities in Portugal, who upon hearing about the deal thought it too favourable to the Dutch. Lisbon revoked Timor's autonomy, and Lopes de Lima fled to Batavia rather than return to Portugal. The 1854 border treaty was rejected by the Dutch House of Representatives, who felt it did not protect religious liberty. The final 1859 Treaty of Lisbon stood in place until 1913, when the Portuguese and Dutch formally agreed to split the island between them. The definitive border was established by the Permanent Court of Arbitration in 1914 and ratified in 1916; it remains the international boundary between East Timor and Indonesia.

The 1859 border treaty was not implemented all at once, with local transfers out of sync with the official ratification in August 1860. Rebellions against Portuguese rule broke out to the east and west of Dili in 1861. This revolt saw forces from Laclo and Ulmera lay siege to Dili. The Portuguese sought assistance from other kingdoms, and managed to suppress the revolt. Further military battles occurred over succeeding years, until 1888 when the thirteen kingdoms of the island's east swore fealty to Portugal. This did not however secure Portuguese control over the whole territory, as kingdoms in other areas remained effectively autonomous.

Coffee soon became the territory's primary export, to the point where some sandalwood forest recovered. There was a small renaissance in the sandalwood trade in the 1850s, including wood smuggled across the border in order to obtain valuable Dutch currency. This collapsed in the 1860s, as new sources elsewhere depressed prices. Then Governor Afonso de Castro shifted the focus of exports to coffee. Efforts began to regrow sandalwood forests at the same time, a four decade process. However, success was hindered by insufficient knowledge of the trees' biology, which require other tree species to obtain nutrients.

For the Portuguese, their colony of Portuguese Timor remained little more than a neglected trading post until the late nineteenth century. Investment in infrastructure, health, and education was minimal. Sandalwood remained the main export crop with coffee exports becoming significant in the mid-nineteenth century. In places where Portuguese rule was asserted, it tended to be brutal and exploitative.

José Celestino da Silva became Governor in 1894 and sought to establish "full and effective control" in the colony in line with international norms arising from the Berlin Conference. The autonomy and persistent rebellions of many kingdoms was viewed as an embarrassment, a view influenced by rebellions in Africa and the humiliation of the 1890 British Ultimatum. While at first proposing to sell the colony due to its underdevelopment, da Silva quickly shifted towards reforms, and sought complete autonomy from Macau. The first military campaign in 1895 headed west to Obulo and Marobo. Those rebelling held off this force with the support of their allies, leading to 6,000 reinforcements being sent in April. After quashing the revolt in Obulo, the commander marched the troops further without permission from Dili, and his forces were defeated and he was killed. This killing increased the desire of Portugal to properly control the territory, and to da Silva began further brutal campaigns alongside local allies. Some kingdoms were completely wiped out, with leaders and populations either dead or displaced to Dutch-controlled territory.

Da Silva's campaign continued west to east, assisted by local allies. A new administrative structure was imposed in some areas alongside direct taxation of residents, bypassing traditional rulers. New restrictions were placed on the Hakka Chinese, with greater government control over economic activities and taxes. Basic infrastructure such as roads were created, as well as some funding for schools, although it remained very limited. In the north, land was prepared for coffee cultivation. Such land was often directly seized or purchased under duress, with land rights often going to Portuguese. Locals were required to work on these plantations. Traditional cultural practices were discouraged, as was identification with specific local kingdoms, both of which weakened traditional rulers. In 1897 Timor was separated from Macau. The military campaigns meant that Portugal had established effective control even of the island's interior.

Portuguese authorities created an administrative structure based on the existing kingdoms, while also creating a new level of administration under them, the suco. This new level was created around villages, or groups of villages linked by kinship. These new administrative boundaries thus reflected family ties, and strengthened family power as villages gained administrative power. This created a permanent shift of powers from the level of the kingdom to that of the villages. Da reduced the power of local kings, and even eliminated smaller and more disloyal kingdoms. Implementation of the head tax required a census, and depended on the loyalty of the local leaders who would be responsible for collection. He also sought to impose a head tax which collected tax from each household, necessitating a census of the territory to count these households. The head tax was imposed by Silva's successor, Eduardo Augusto Marques, once the census was complete. The needs of the census meant power at this time also flowed to leaders of aldeias, a smaller unit that sucos whose leaders were responsible for some tax collection and were given formal military ranks.

=== Early twentieth century ===
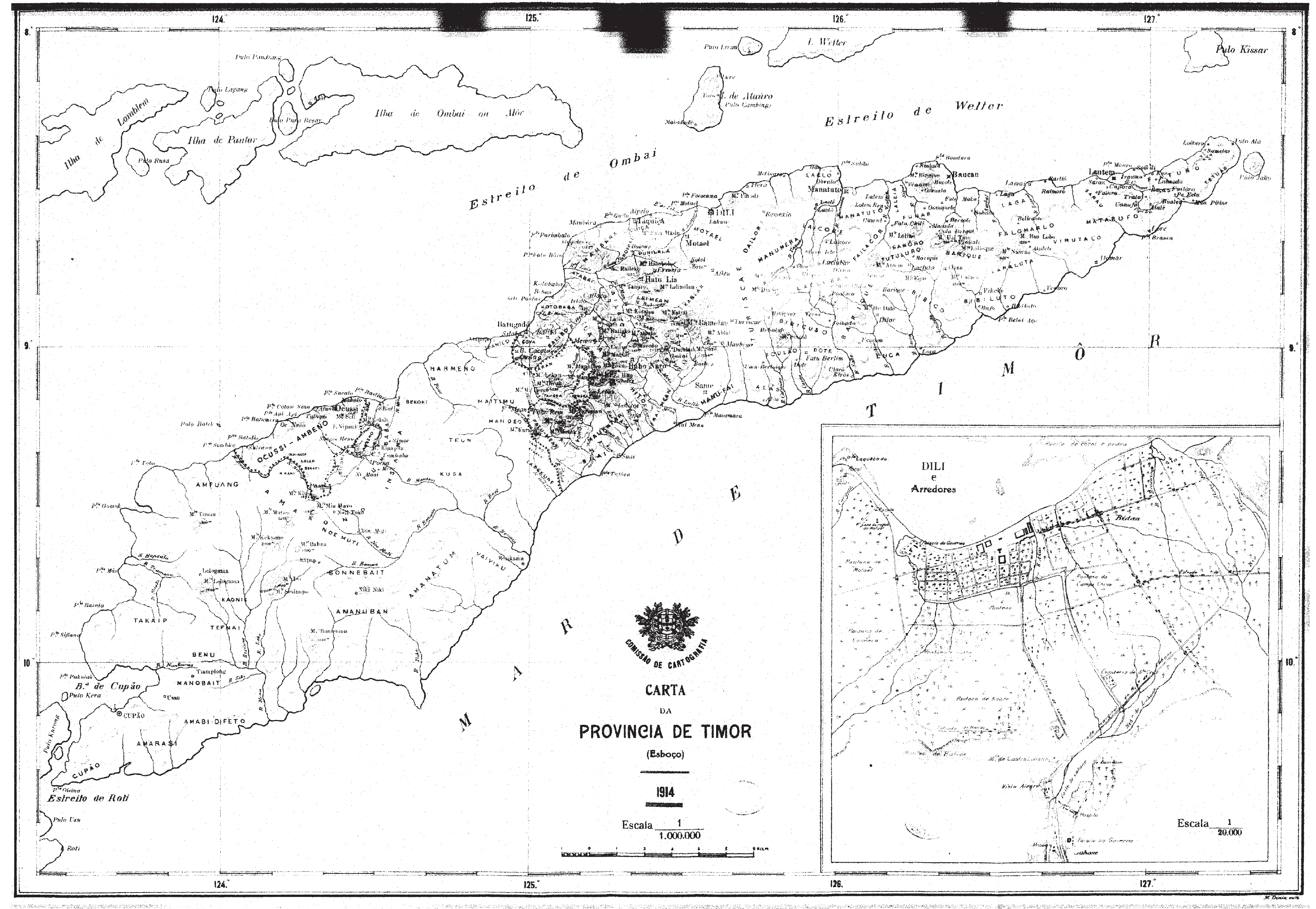
1914 Portuguese map of Portuguese Timor and Dili.

At the beginning of the twentieth century, a faltering home economy prompted the Portuguese to extract greater wealth from its colonies, resulting in increased resistance to Portuguese rule in Portuguese Timor. A 1904 treaty with the Dutch removed some enclaves, with Maucatar being ceded to Portugal and Noimuti being ceded to the Netherlands.

José Celestino da Silva returned to Portugal in 1908. Governor Filomeno da Câmara de Melo Cabral, who arrived in 1910, increased the head tax to 2.5 patacas, instead of just 1, prompting some to leave to Dutch-controlled territory. Failure to pay the tax often led individuals to indentured labour on coffee plantations, or service to richer individuals who paid the tax on their behalf. A census was begun annually to facilitate tax collection, initially counting just men of taxable age, and later collecting age and sex data. The 1910 overthrowing of the Portuguese Monarchy was announced in Dili three weeks after the event. This republicanism concerned local rulers, adding to existing tensions over new and higher taxes. Separate uprisings began throughout the island, which were eventually defeated by colonial forces and local allies. To defeat this revolt Portugal brought in troops from the Portuguese colonies of Mozambique and Macau, and the war saw the deaths of 3,000 Portuguese Timorese. The remaining power of the kings further diminished after the 5 October 1910 revolution, especially as many Timorese kings were monarchist sympathisers. The kings were reduced to operating Administrative posts on behalf of the Portuguese.

Colonial policy shifted back towards using indigenous rulers as figureheads, sometimes installing new more cooperative rulers. Efforts to repress local customs were reversed, with the intention of coopting such practices instead. Coffee plantations continued to expand, and taxes were increased. Many Portuguese males who gained control of coffee plantations married local women, leading to a growing mestiço population. Immigration also increased the Chinese population in some areas.

On 16 September 1901 sandalwood harvesting was banned along much of the north coast, as was slash-and-burn agriculture. Despite the ban on harvesting, sandalwood exports continued to rise until 1913. A drop in the years afterwards led to Governor Raimundo Enes Meira banning all sandalwood harvesting and export on 15 February 1925. In 1929 a localised easing of this ban was issued by Governor Teófilo Duarte for Oecusse, a response to slightly better existing stock, smuggling to Dutch Timor, and a lack of control of the exclave. New replanting efforts begun in 1946 by Governor Óscar Freire de Vasconcelos Ruas also failed, and by 1975 sandalwood trees were found only in Oecusse, Cova Lima, Bobonaro, and pockets of the northern coast. No restoration efforts took place under Indonesian rule.

Proposed flag for Portuguese Timor (1932).

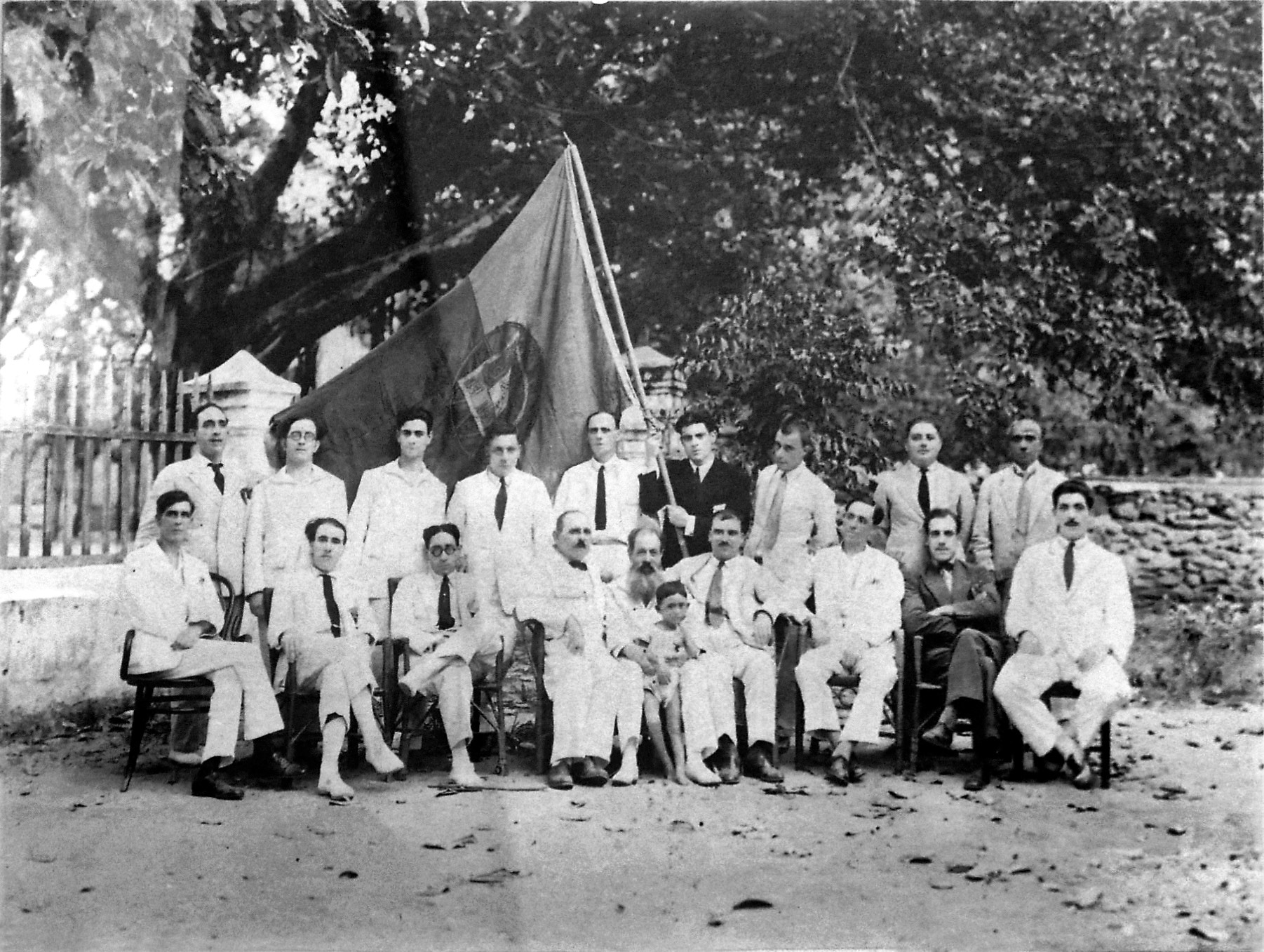
Group of political deportees in Timor, 1932.

A military coup in Portugal and the subsequent rise of dictator António de Oliveira Salazar saw racial categories becoming fully codified, separating the bulk of the native population, who were designated as uncivilised, from the white settlers, mestiços, and the assimilados (natives considered to have become civilised and assimilated). The colony was seen as an economic burden during the Great Depression, and received little support or management from Portugal.

In the 1930s, the Japanese semi-governmental Nan'yō Kōhatsu development company, with the secret sponsorship of the Imperial Japanese Navy (IJN), invested heavily in a joint-venture with the primary plantation company of Portuguese Timor, SAPT. The joint-venture effectively controlled imports and exports into the island by the mid-1930s and the extension of Japanese interests greatly concerned the British, Dutch and Australian authorities.

=== World War II ===
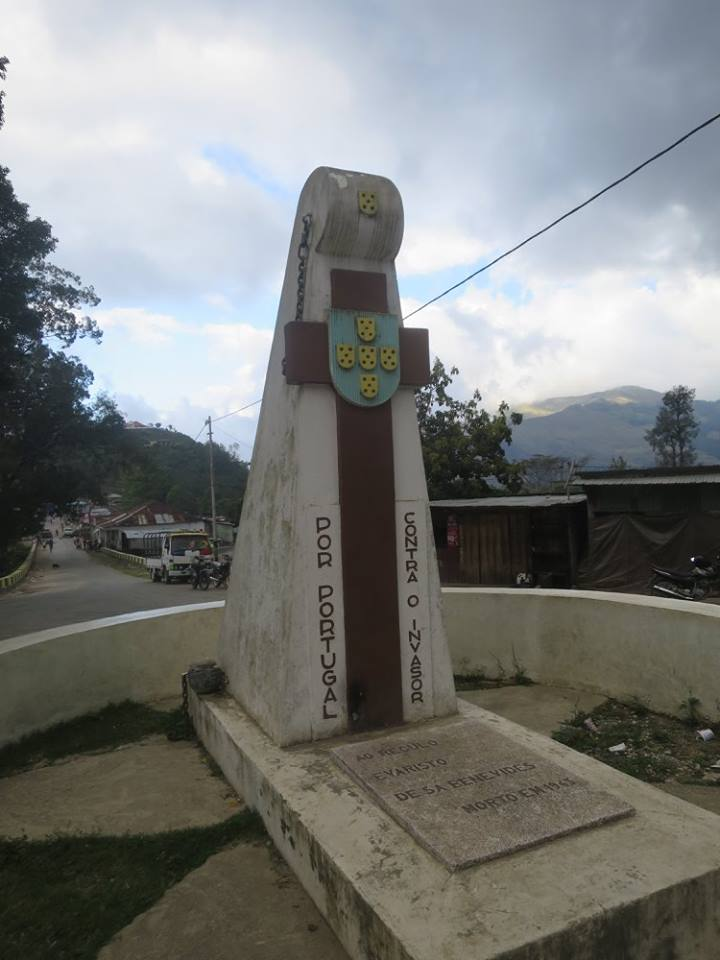
Memorial to chief Evaristo de Sá Benevides.

Although Portugal was neutral during World War II, in December 1941, Portuguese Timor was occupied by a small British, Australian and Dutch force, to preempt a Japanese invasion. However, the Japanese did invade in the Battle of Timor in February 1942. Under Japanese occupation, the borders of the Dutch and Portuguese were ignored with Timor island being made a single Imperial Japanese Army (IJA) administration zone. Because of Portugal's neutrality, the Japanese left the Portuguese governor in place and in formal control of Liquiçá. 400 Australian and Dutch commandos trapped on the island by the Japanese invasion waged a guerrilla campaign in the mountainous interior, the Battle of Timor, which tied up Japanese troops and inflicted over 1,000 casualties. Timorese and the Portuguese helped the guerrillas but following the Allies' eventual evacuation, Japanese retribution from their soldiers and Timorese militia (the Black Columns) raised in Dutch Timor was severe. By the end of the War, an estimated 40–60,000 Timorese had died, the economy was in ruins, and famine widespread.

Under Japanese rule, there were changes to the administrative structures that created larger districts (the former kingdoms) and a reduced number of suco.

=== Post-WWII ===
Portuguese Timor Arms (1935–1975)

Following World War II, the Portuguese promptly returned to reclaim their colony, while Dutch Timor became part of Indonesia as Indonesian Timor, when it secured its independence in 1949.

Keen to maintain its colonies under the ideology of Lusotropicalism, Portugal formally declared Timor as an Overseas province. A small increase in education, infrastructure, and health development was coupled with increased repression. The international pressure for decolonisation and unrest in Portuguese Africa had little impact internally in Portuguese Timor, where identities remained linked to local kingdoms.

The 1959 Viqueque rebellion saw the only post-WWII violent resistance to Portuguese rule.

To rebuild the economy, colonial administrators forced local chiefs to supply labourers which further damaged the agricultural sector. Coffee exports were promoted by the government. However, the economy did not improve substantially, and infrastructure improvements were limited. Growth rates remained low, near 2%. The role of the Catholic Church in Portuguese Timor grew following the Portuguese government handing over the education of the Timorese to the Church in 1941. In post-war Portuguese Timor, primary and secondary school education levels significantly increased, albeit on a very low base.

Although illiteracy in 1973 was estimated at 93 percent of the population, the small educated elite of Portuguese Timorese produced by the Church in the 1960s and 1970s became the independence leaders during the Indonesian occupation. Towards the end of their rule, Portugal provided around US$5 million per year to East Timor.

=== End of Portuguese rule ===
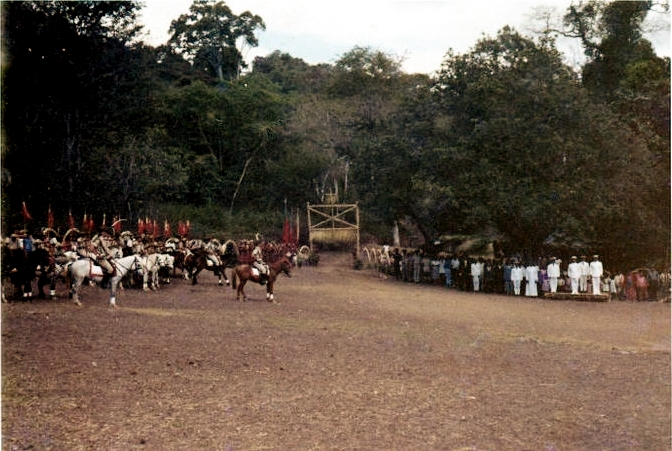
Portuguese ceremony in Atabae (1970)

Proposed flag for Portuguese Timor (1965).

Following a 1974 coup (the "Carnation Revolution"), the new Government of Portugal favoured the immediate decolonisation process for Portuguese territories in Asia and Africa. When Portuguese Timorese political parties were first legalised in April 1974, three major players emerged. The Timorese Democratic Union (UDT) was dedicated to preserving Portuguese Timor as a protectorate of Portugal, and in September announced its support for independence. It was formed by members of the existing National Action Party and plantation owners. Fretilin, formed by trade unionists and anti-colonialists, endorsed "the universal doctrines of socialism", as well as "the right to independence", and later declared itself "the only legitimate representative of the people". A third party, APODETI, emerged advocating Portuguese Timor's integration with Indonesia expressing concerns that an independent East Timor would be economically weak and vulnerable. Other minor political parties emerged as well: the monarchist Association of Timorese Heroes, a small party advocating union with Australia, and the Timorese Labour Party. The rapid political changes fed down to the local level, where political allegiance was affected by existing internal divisions and intra-suco divisions. Apodeti gained little support outside of Atsabe Administrative Post.

On 14 November 1974, Mário Lemos Pires - an Army officer - was appointed by the new Portuguese Government as Governor and Commander-in-Chief of Portuguese Timor.

Meanwhile, the political dispute between the Portuguese Timorese parties soon gave rise to an armed conflict, that included the participation of members of the Colonial Police and Timorese soldiers of the Portuguese Army.

In August, a UDT faction seized control of government buildings in Dili and began to arrest members of Fretilin. While hundreds were arrested, most of the Fretilin leadership escaped south to Aileu. While there were some similar actions in other towns, UDT was unable to build upon its initial surprise action. Fretilin, with the support of much of the former colonial armed forces, began a counter-attack on 20 August.

Unable to control the conflict with the few Portuguese troops that he had at his disposal, Lemos Pires decided to leave Dili with his staff and transfer the seat of the administration to Atauro Island (located 25 km off Dili) in late August 1975. At the same time, he requested Lisbon to send military reinforcements, the request being responded with the sending of a warship, the NRP Afonso Cerqueira, which arrived in Portuguese Timorese waters in early October.

On 28 November 1975, Fretilin unilaterally declared the colony's independence, as the Democratic Republic of East Timor (República Democrática de Timor-Leste).

Representatives of UDT and APODETI, encouraged by Indonesian intelligence, declared that the territory should become part of Indonesia.

On 7 December 1975, the Indonesian Armed Forces launched an invasion of East Timor. At 3:00 a.m., the two Portuguese corvettes, the NRP João Roby and NRP Afonso Cerqueira, anchored near Atauro, detected on the radar a high number of unidentified air and naval targets approaching. They soon identified the targets as Indonesian military aircraft and warships, which initiated an assault against Dili. Lemos Pires and his staff then left Atauro, embarked on the Portuguese warships, and headed to Darwin in the Northern Territory of Australia.

The João Roby and Afonso Cerqueira were ordered to continue patrolling the waters around the former Portuguese Timor, in preparation of possible military action to respond to the Indonesian invasion, constituting the naval task force UO 20.1.2 (latter renamed FORNAVTIMOR). Portugal sent a third warship to the region, the NRP Oliveira e Carmo, which arrived on 31 January 1976 and replaced the NRP Afonso Cerqueira. The Portuguese warships would continue in the region until May 1976, when the remaining NRP Oliveira e Carmo left, going back to Lisbon, at a time when a military action to expel the Indonesian forces was clearly seen as unviable.

On 17 July 1976, Indonesia formally annexed East Timor, declaring it as its 27th province and renaming it Timor Timur. The United Nations, however, did not recognise the annexation, continuing to consider Portugal as the legal Administering Power of what under international law was still Portuguese Timor.

Following the end of Indonesian occupation in 1999, and a United Nations administered transition period, East Timor became formally independent 20 May 2002 as Timor-Leste.

== Currency ==
The first Timorese currency was the Portuguese Timorese pataca, introduced in 1894.

From 1959, the Portuguese Timorese escudo – linked to the Portuguese escudo – was used.

In 1975, the currency ceased to exist as East Timor was annexed by Indonesia and began using the Indonesian rupiah.

== Gallery ==
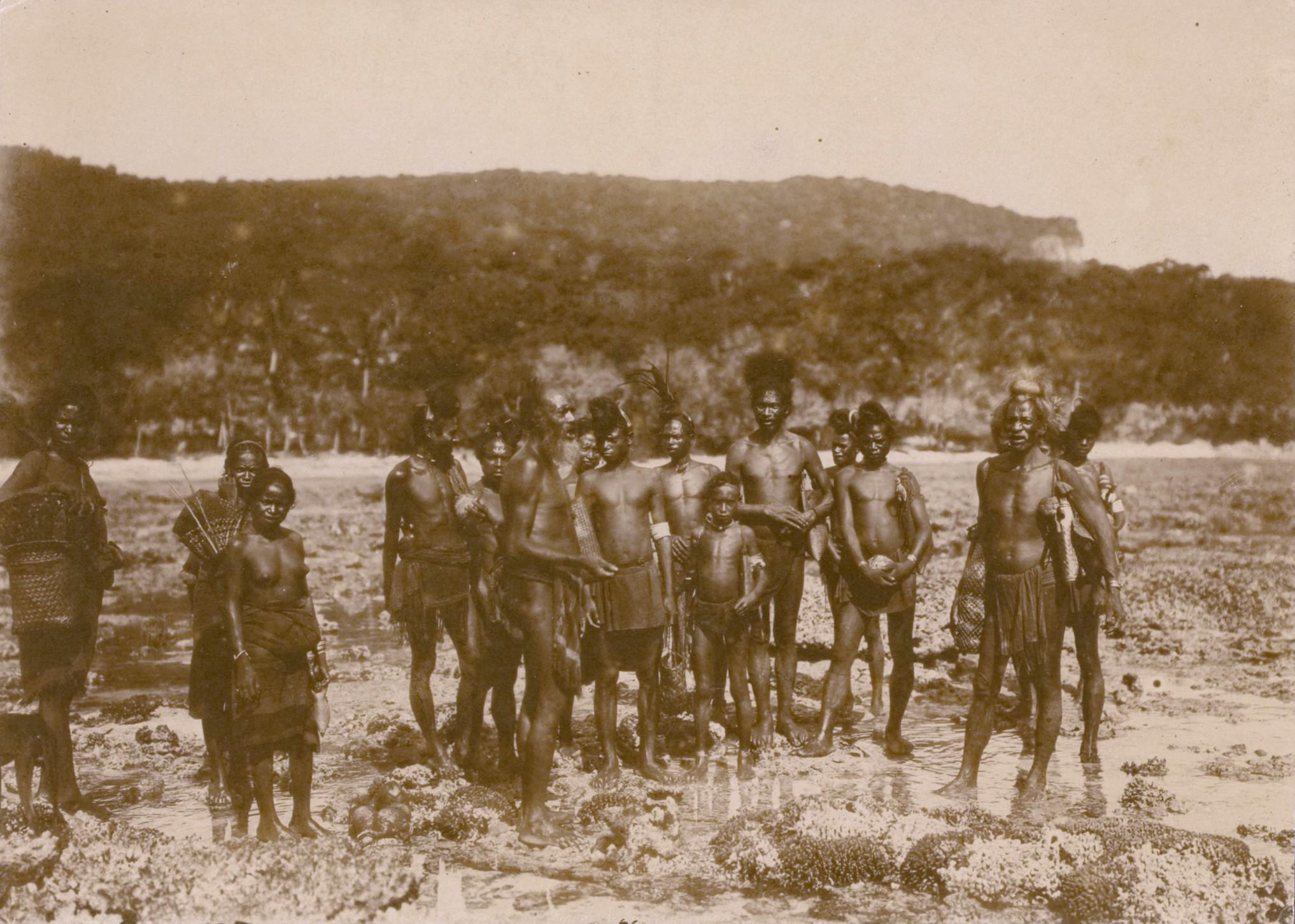
Inhabitants of Portuguese Timor in 1900.

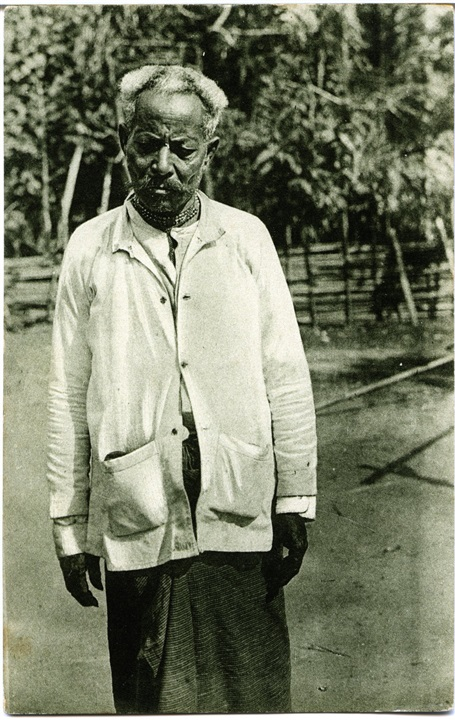
Timorese dato in 1900.

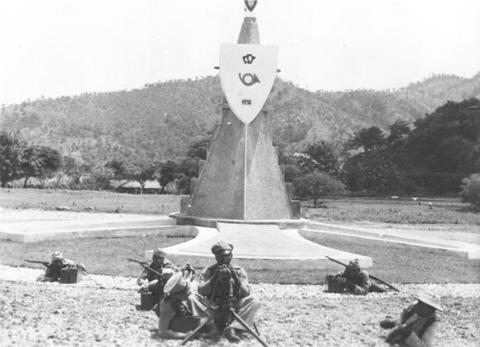
Monument on the road to the military camp at Tai Bessi in 1938.

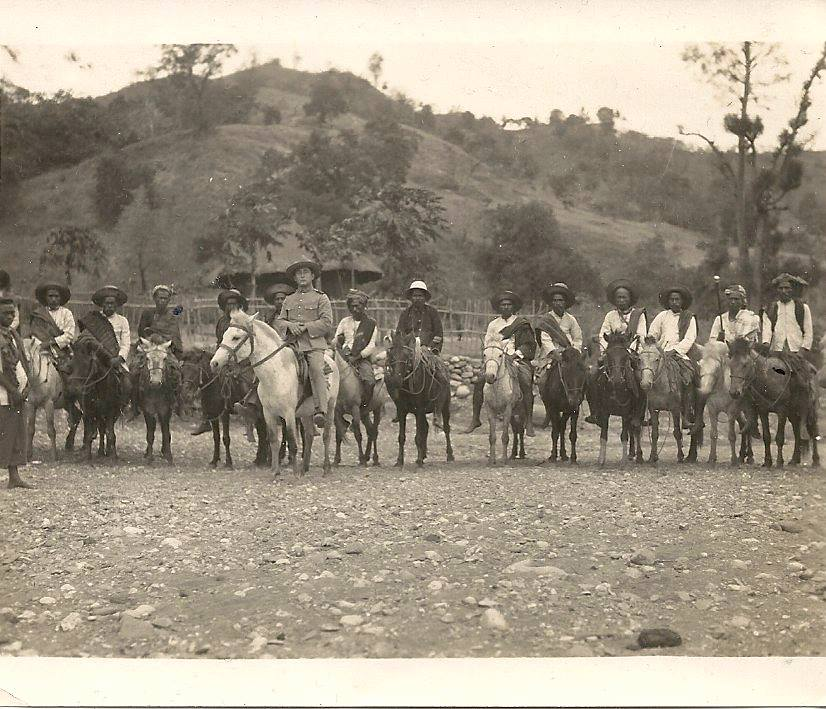
Portuguese commander with local troops in Balibo (1930s)

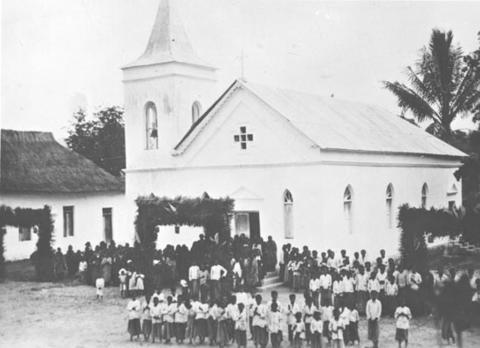
Catholic ceremony in Timor in 1940.

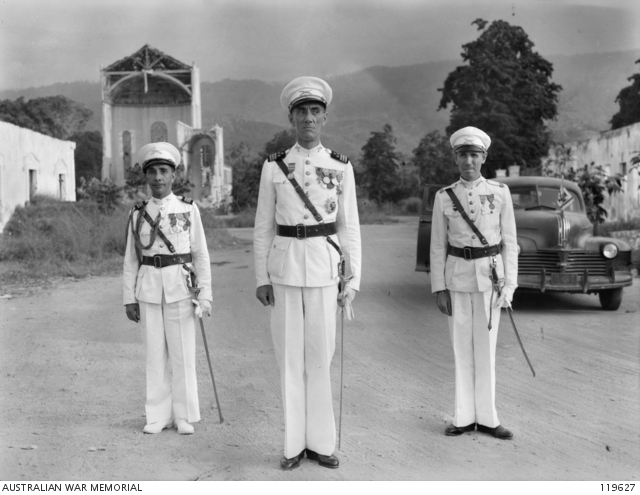
Portuguese governor Senhor Manuel Ferreira de Carvalho welcomes the Australians in 1945.

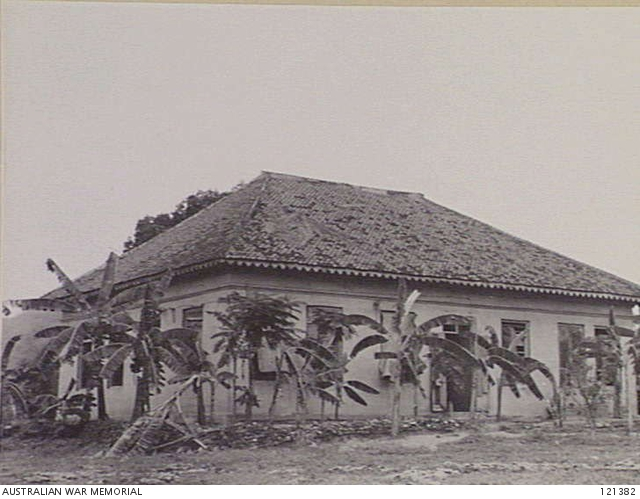
House where Australian soldiers and Portuguese nationals met during the Japanese occupation at Tai Bessi.

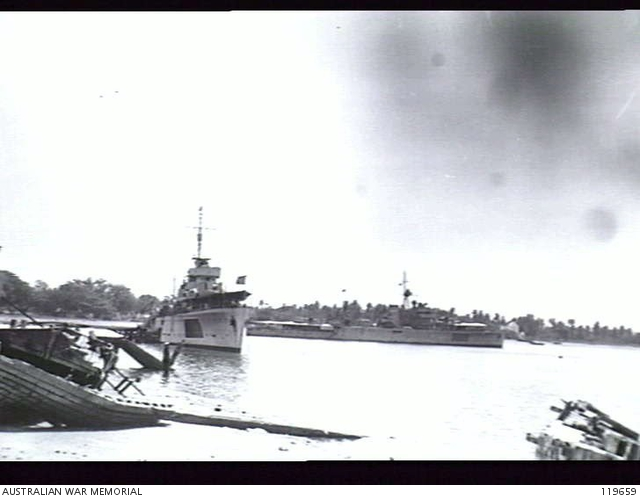
Portuguese sloop Gonçalves Zarco and Bartolomeu Dias at anchor in Dili in 1945.

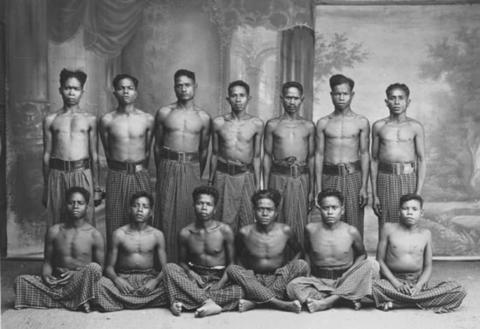
Timorese in the service of the "Timor Geographical Mission".

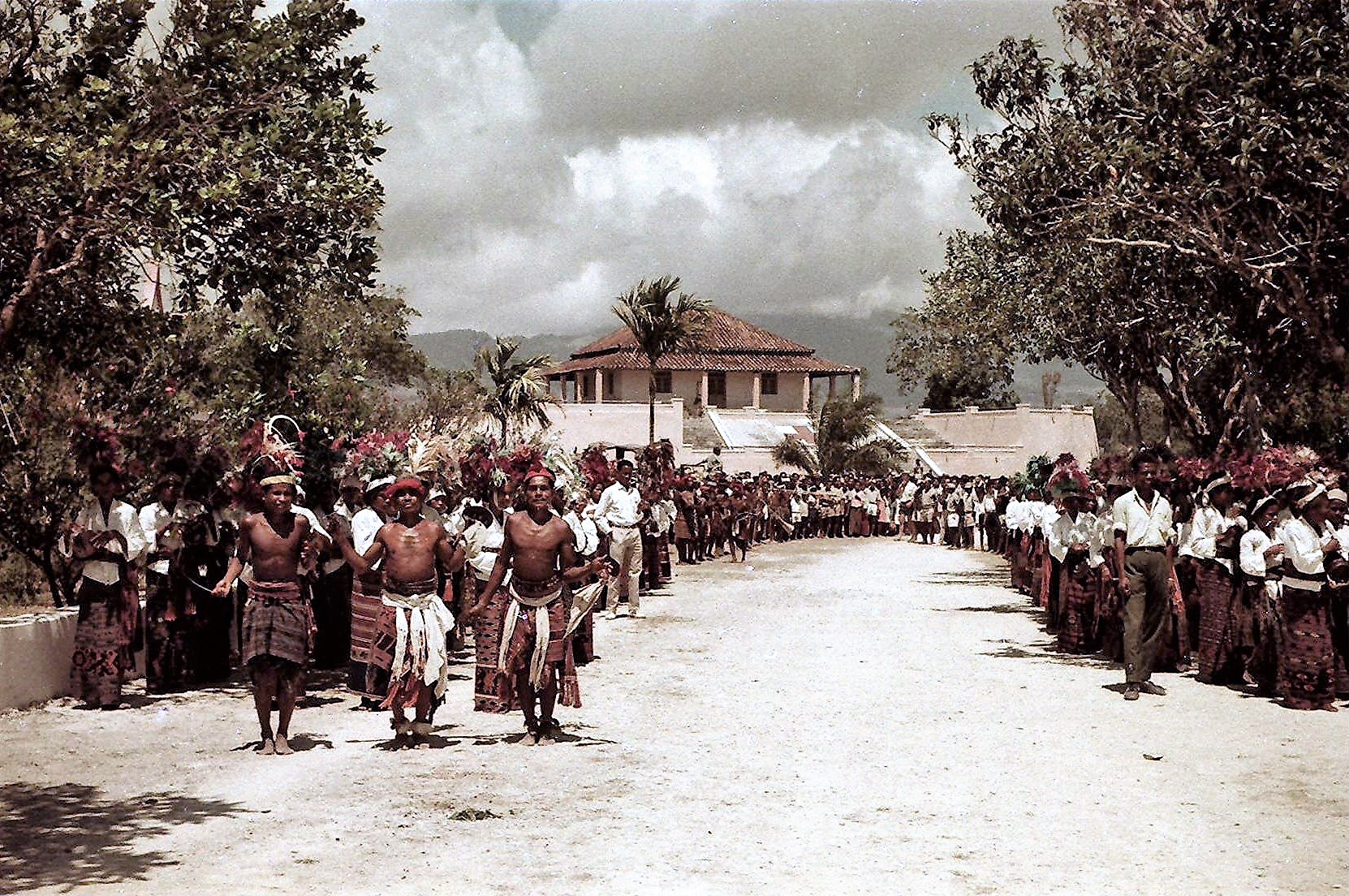
Timorese dancers in 1966.

=== Architecture ===
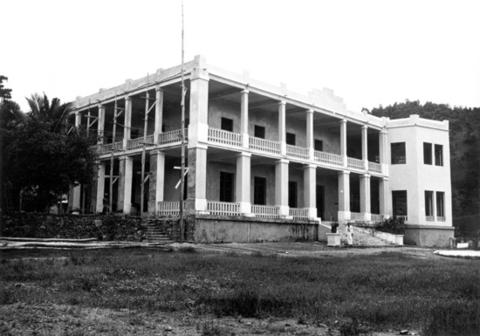
Assembly house of employees of Timor.

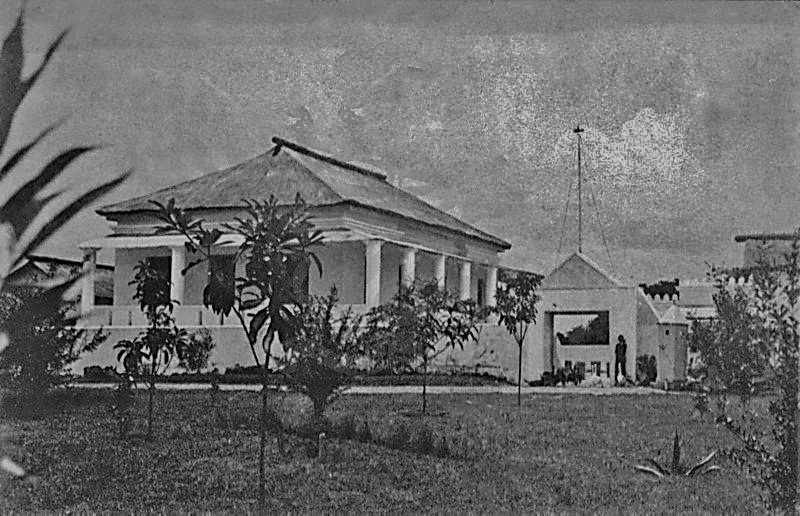
Military command house at Manu-Fahi in 1908.

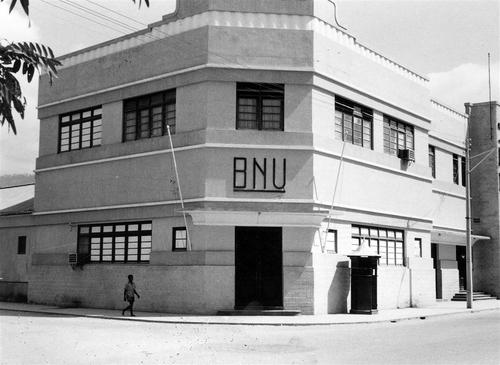
Building of the Banco Nacional Ultramarino in 1950.

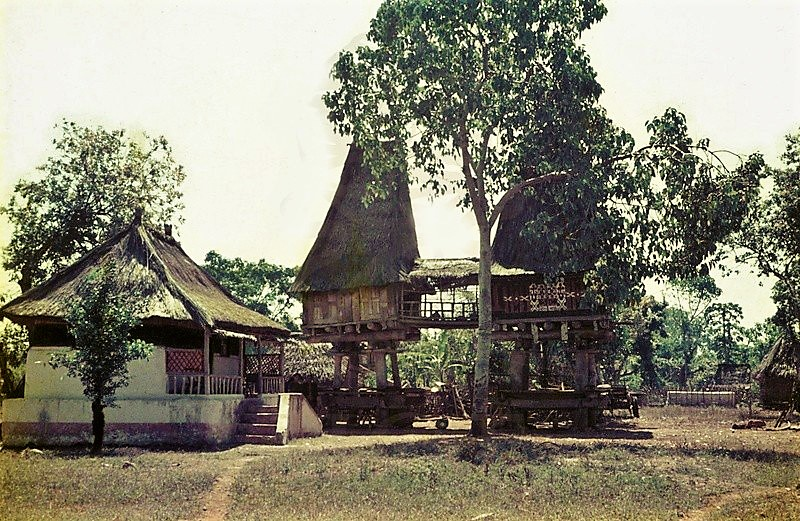
Timorese houses at Tutuala in 1966.

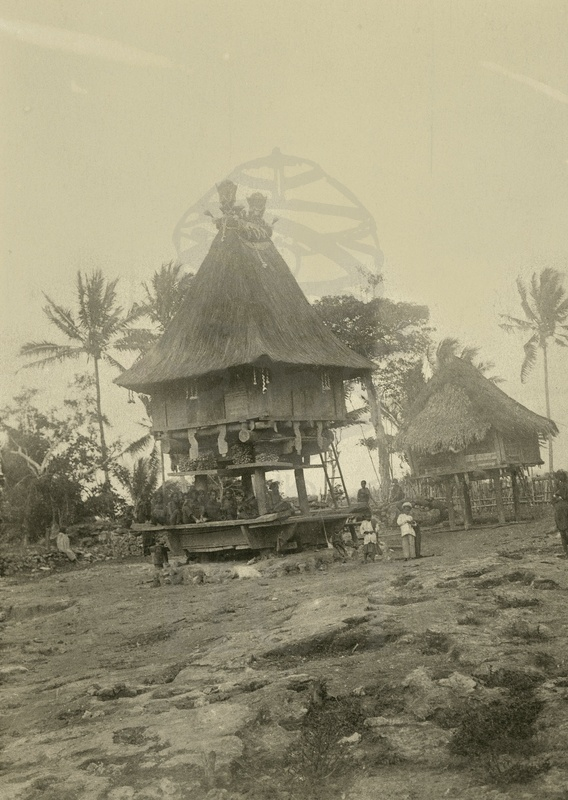
Fortified Timorese residence in Maluro.

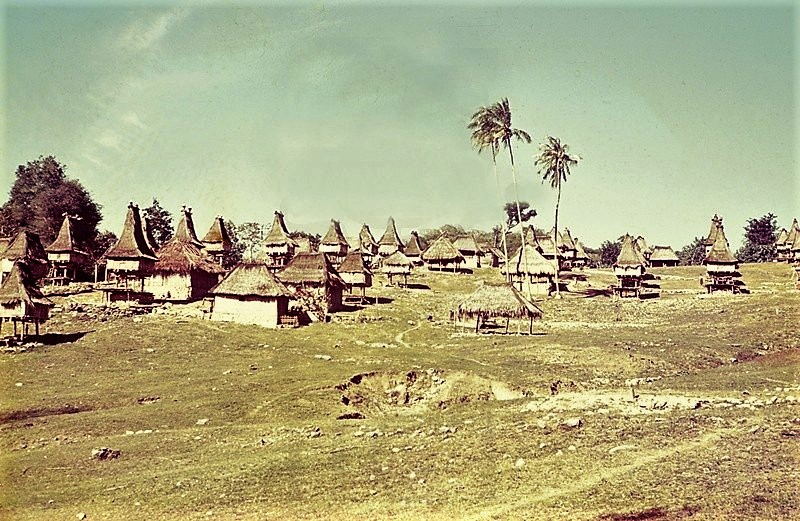
Tutuala village in 1966.

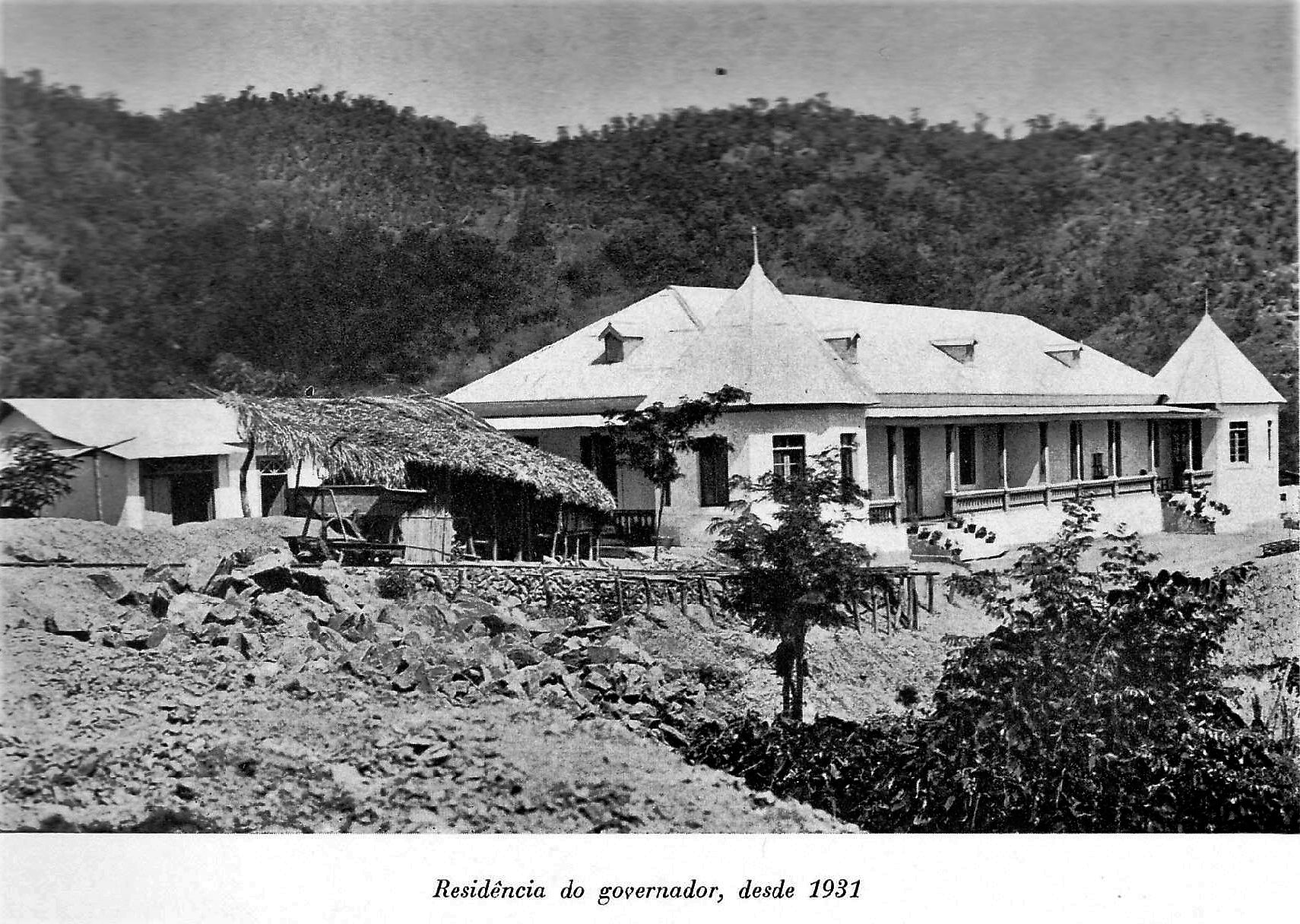
Lahane Palace, governor's residence in 1931.

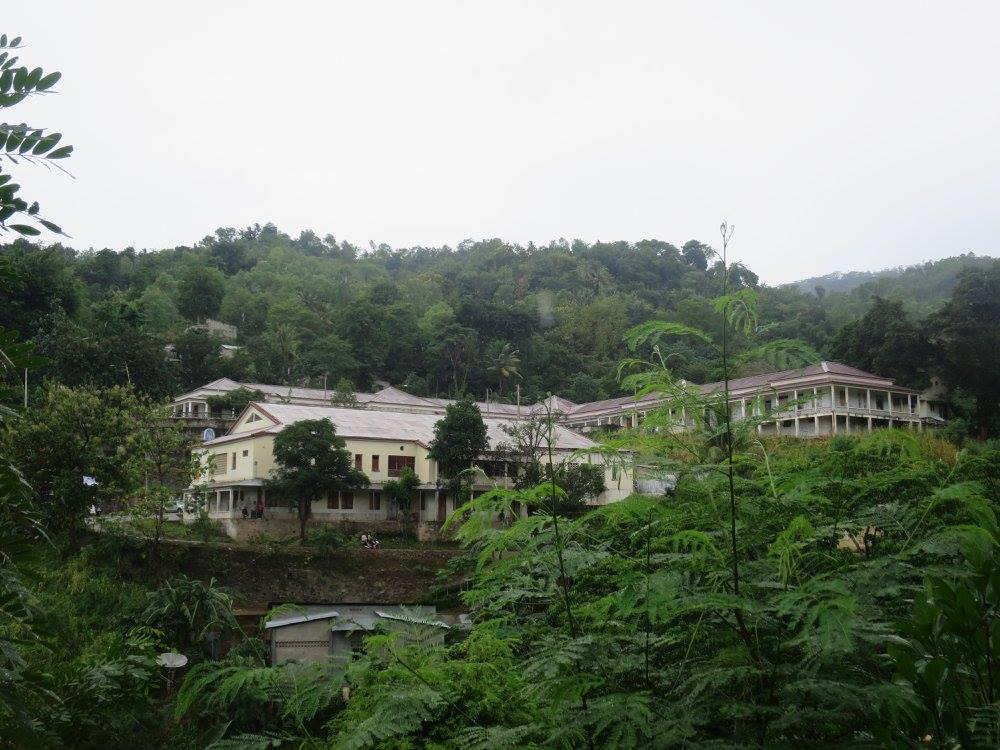
Former Portuguese hospital at Lahane.

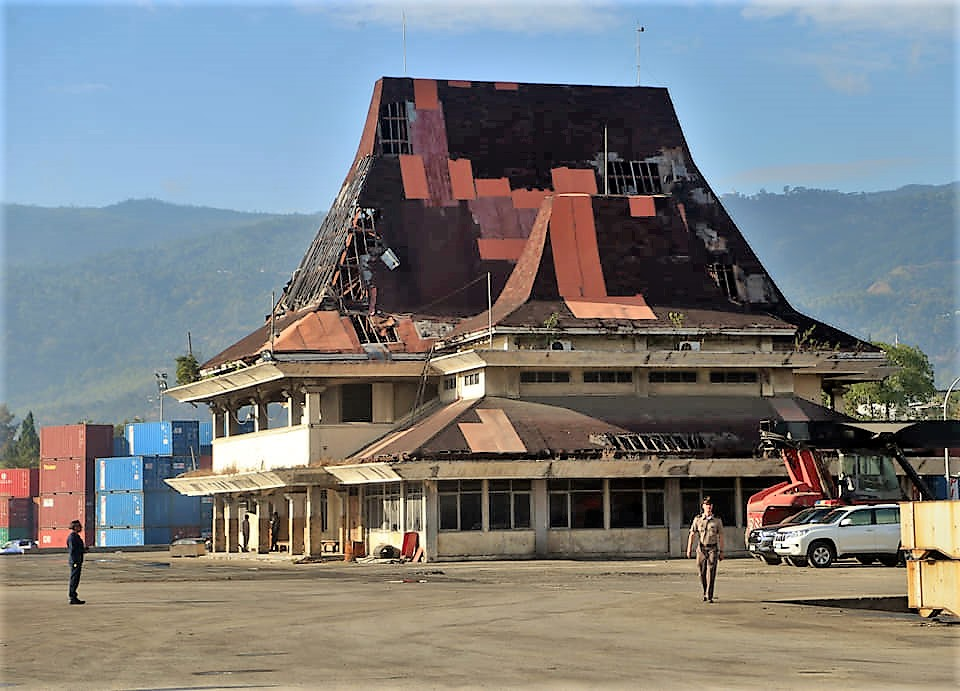
Portuguese-built harbour installations at Dili.

=== Currency ===
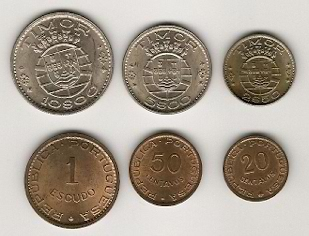
Portuguese Timor 20 Escudos 1967

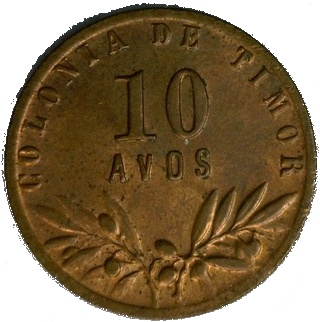
10 avos of Portuguese Timor.

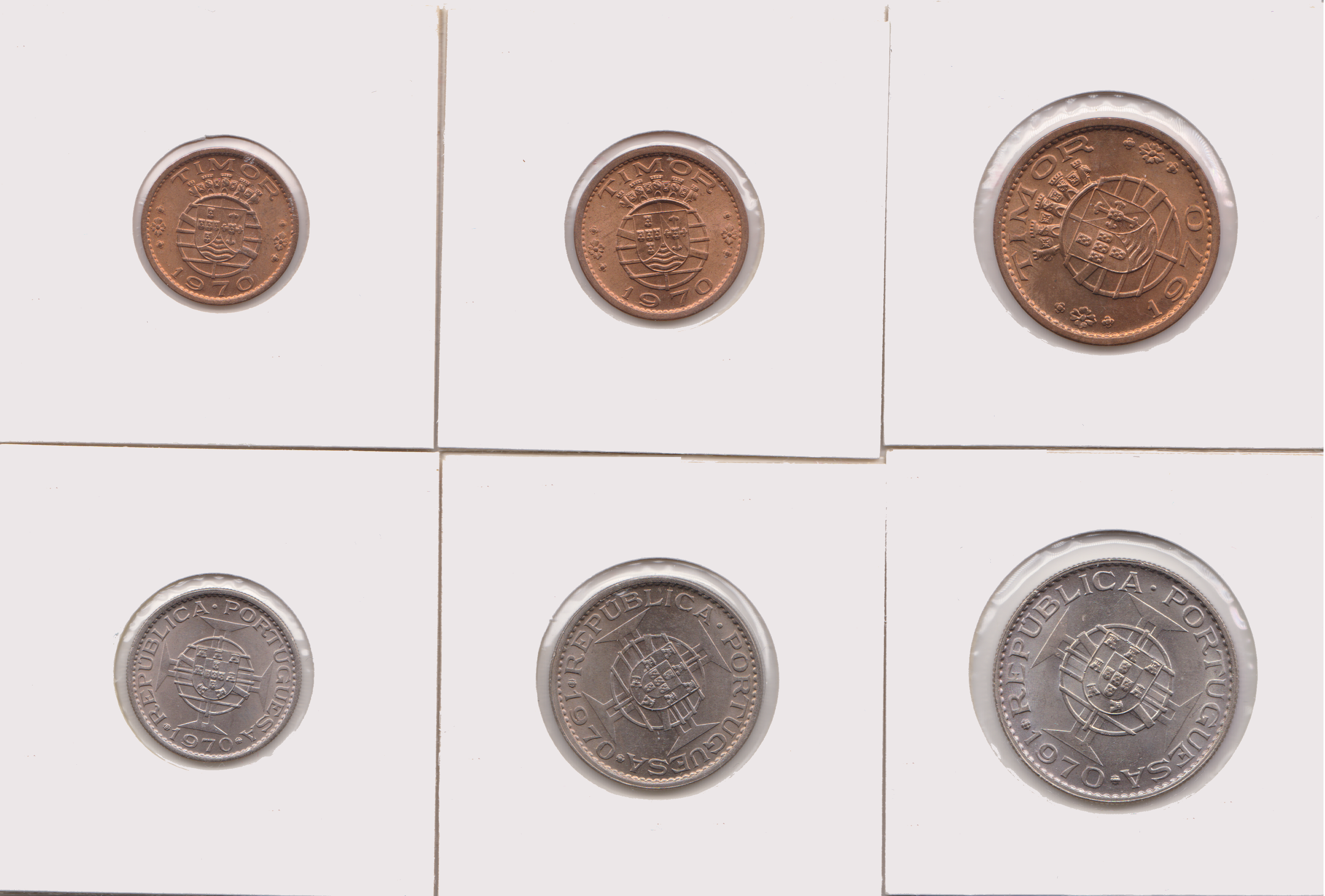
1970 Portuguese Timor escudos.

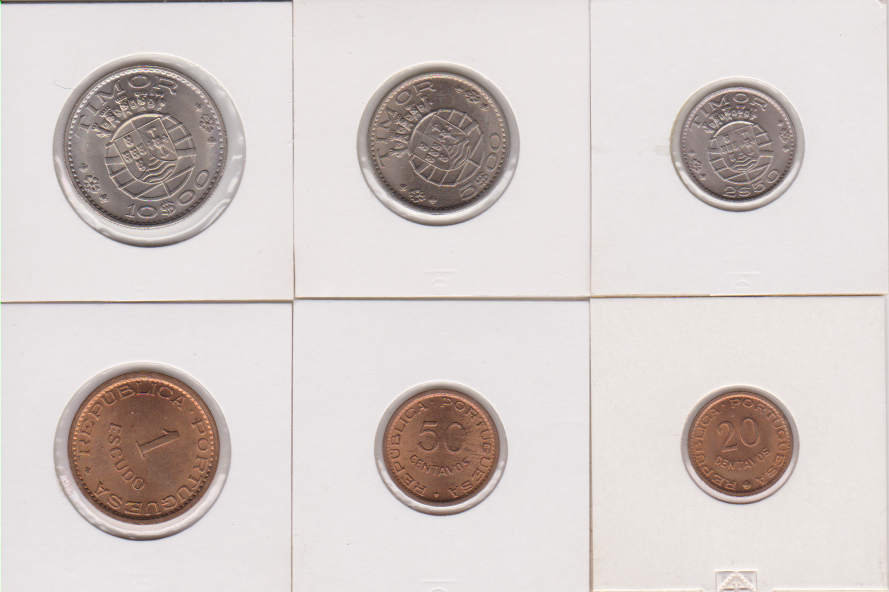
1970 Portuguese Timor escudos reverse.

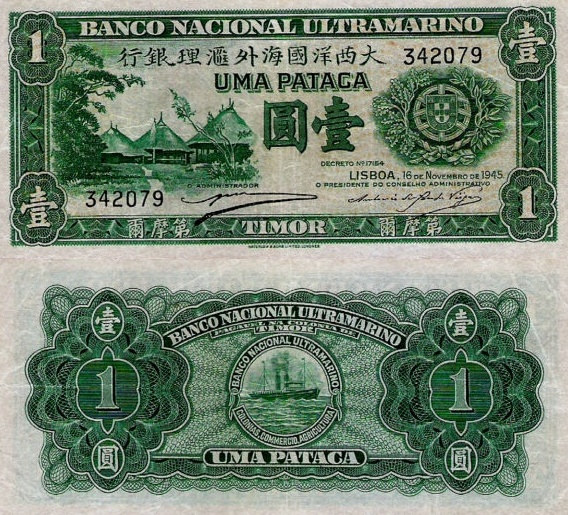
Portuguese Timor 1 pataca banknote.

=== Stamps ===
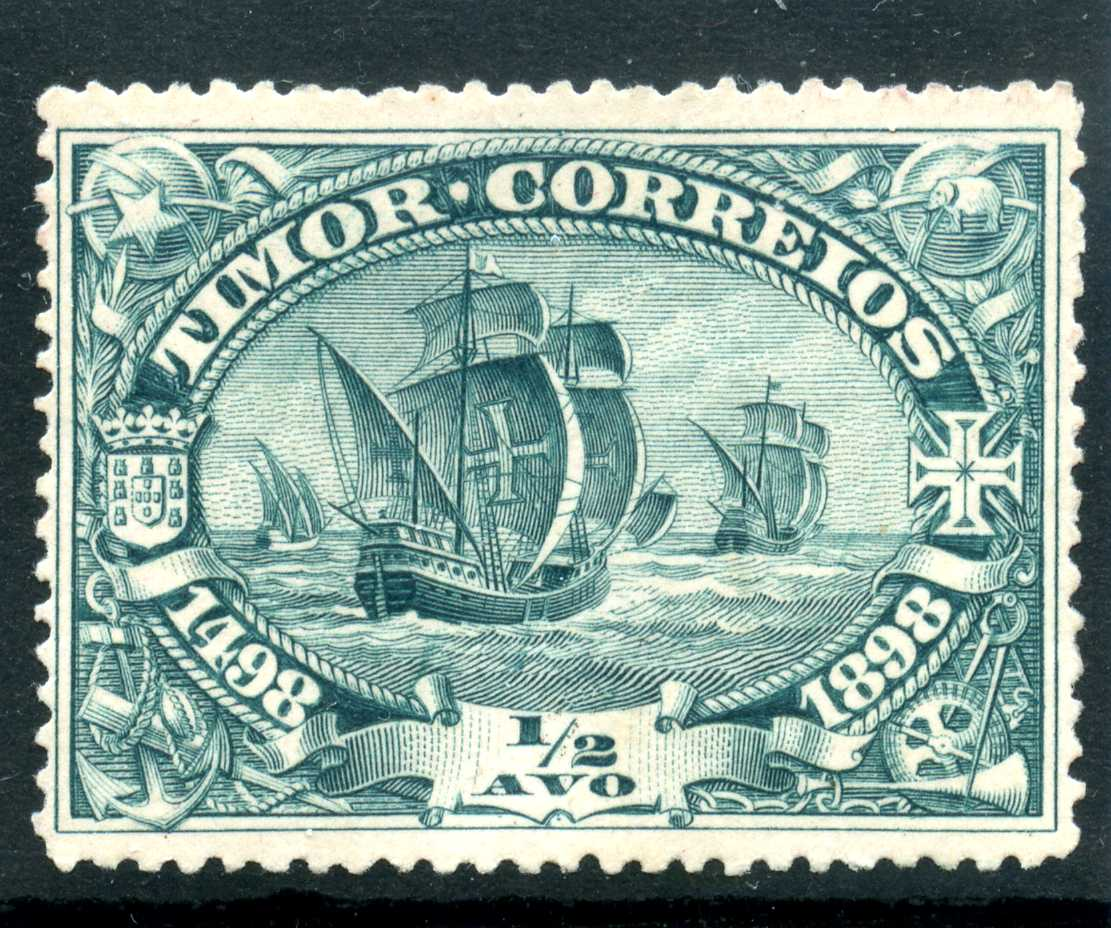
Portuguese Timor 1/2 avo 1898 stamp.

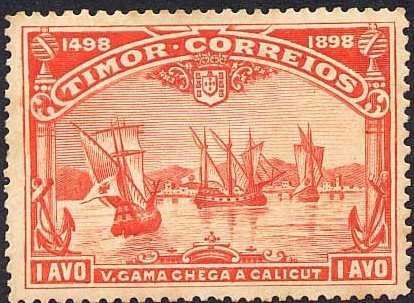
1898 1 avo stamp.

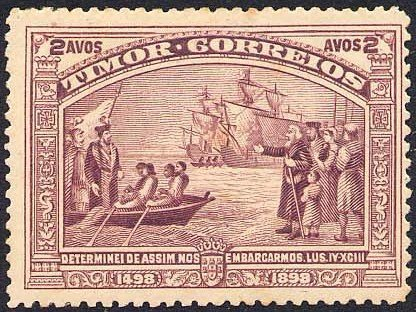
1898 2 avos stamp.

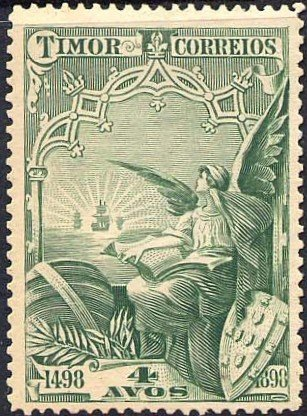
1898 4 avos stamp.

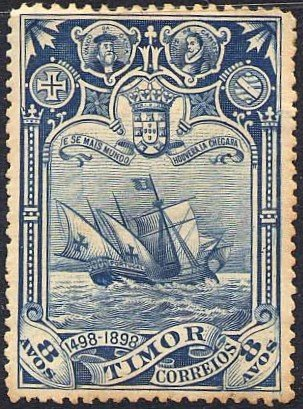
1898 8 avos stamp.

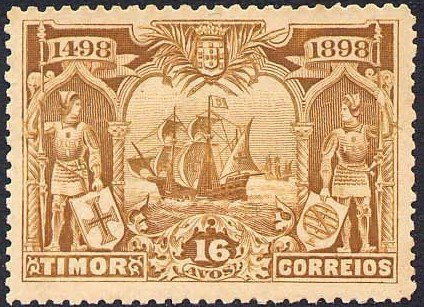
1898 16 avos stamp.

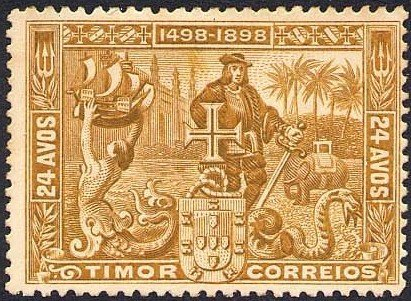
1898 24 avos stamp.

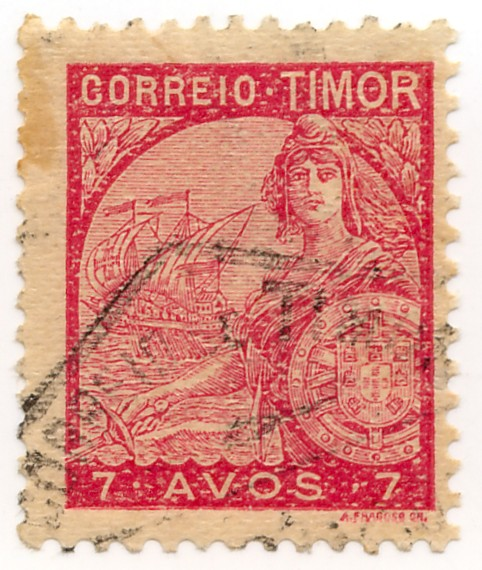
Portuguese Timor 7 avos stamp.

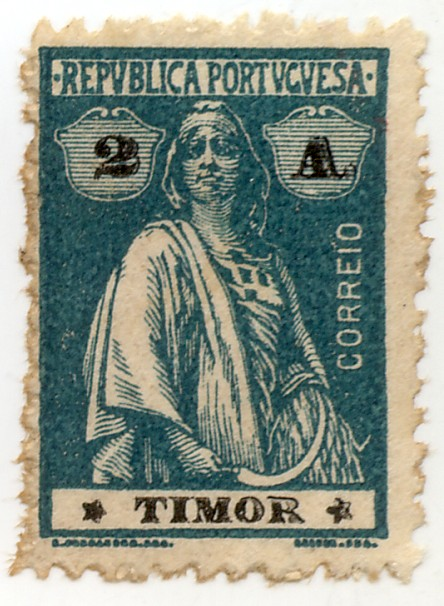
Portuguese Timor 2 avos stamp.

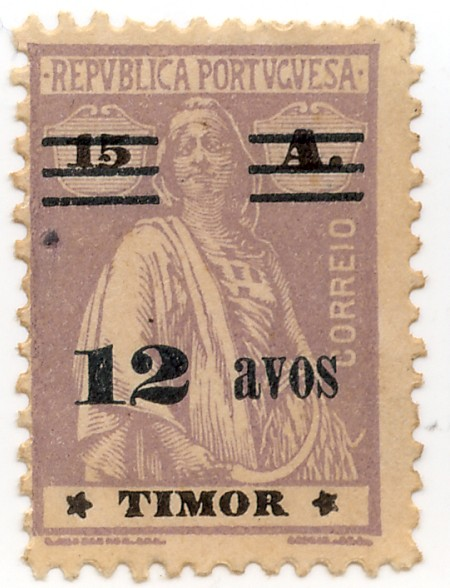
Stamp of Portuguese Timor.

== See also ==
- History of Timor-Leste
- List of colonial governors of Portuguese Timor
- Armorial of Portuguese colonies
- Campaigns of Pacification and Occupation

== References and further reading ==
- Boxer, C. R. "Portuguese Timor: A Rough Island Story, 1515–1960." History Today (May 1960) 19#5) pp. 349–355.
- Corfield, Justin (2015). 'The Entrance Door to Australia': Australia and East Timor Before the Second World War. Lara, Vic: Gentext Publications. ISBN 978-1876586270.
- Dunn, James (1996). Timor: A People Betrayed. Sydney: Australian Broadcasting Corporation. ISBN 0733305377.
- Durand, Frédéric B (2017). History of Timor-Leste. Chiang Mai: Silkworm Books. ISBN 978-6162151248.
- Goto, Kenichi. "Japan and Portuguese Timor in the 1930s and early 1940s" (PDF). Archived from the original (PDF) on 29 June 2011.
- Gunn, Geoffrey C (2011). Historical Dictionary of East Timor. Lanham, Maryland: Scarecrow Press. ISBN 9780810867543.
- Indonesia. Department of Foreign Affairs. Decolonization in East Timor. Jakarta: Department of Information, Republic of Indonesia, 1977. OCLC 4458152.
- Schwarz, A. (1994). A Nation in Waiting: Indonesia in the 1990s. Westview Press. ISBN 1863736352.
- Taylor, Jean Gelman (2003). Indonesia: Peoples and Histories. New Haven and London: Yale University Press. ISBN 0300105185.
- West, Barbara A. (2009). Encyclopedia of the Peoples of Asia and Oceania. Infobase Publishing. ISBN 978-0816071098.
