= Fort Maubara =

Dutch fortress in Maubara, East Timor

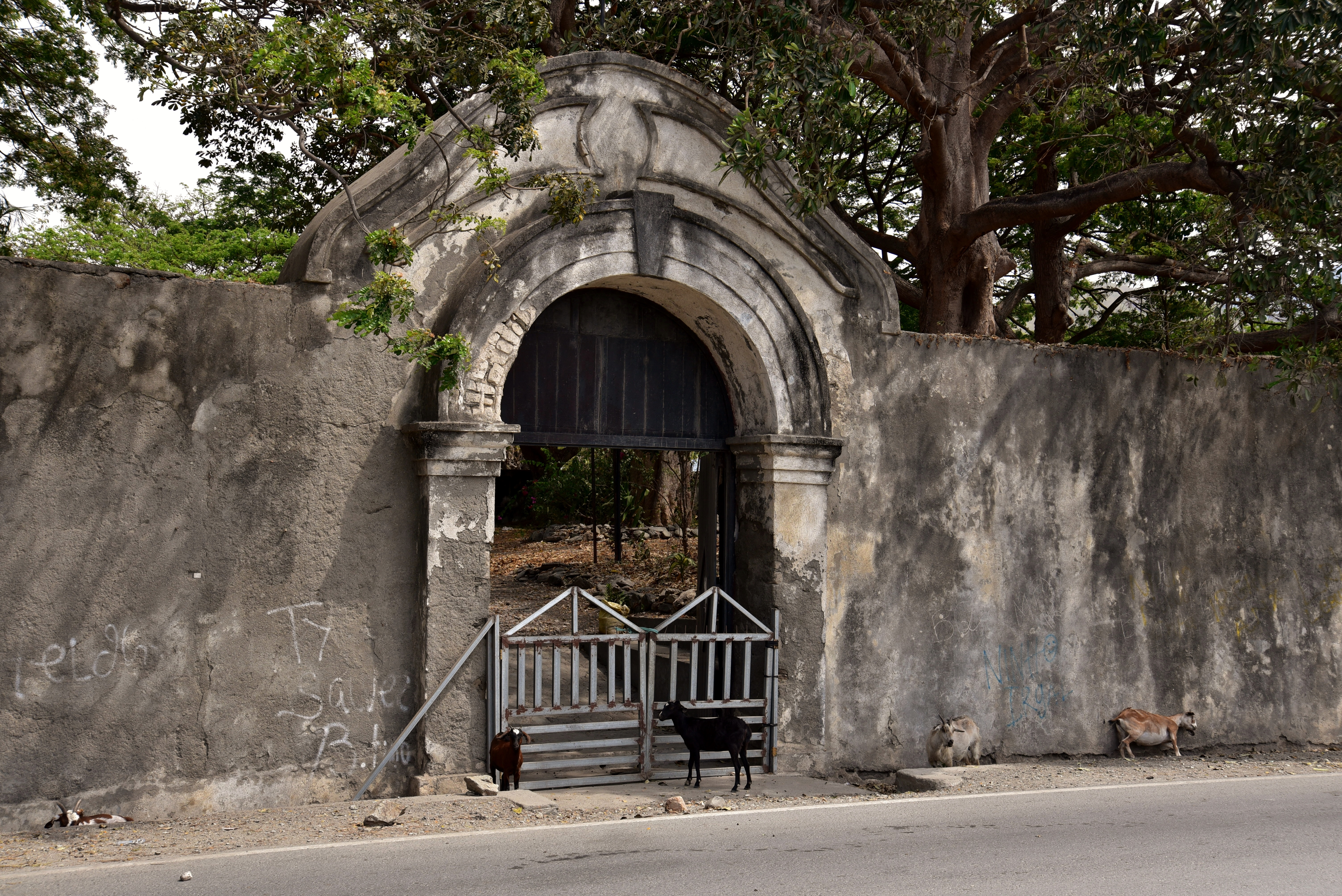
- Front gate of Fort Maubara, East Timor

- Location within East Timor

General information
- Architectural style: 18th century colonial
- Location: Maubara, East Timor
- Coordinates: 8°36′37.4″S 125°12′16.0″E
- Completed: 1758

Technical details
- Structural system: Stone built barracks fort

Fort Maubara is a small Dutch colonial fortress located in the East Timorese town of Maubara, Suco Vaviquinia, Maubara administrative post, Liquiçá municipality. The rectangular fort, on whose wall two cannons still stand, is the most striking building in the town. It is located directly at the entrance to Maubara, on the well-developed thoroughfare, from where visitors could see the entire bay from the beach. The fort is owned by the state, but is managed by the Maubara Association Mós Bele.

== History ==
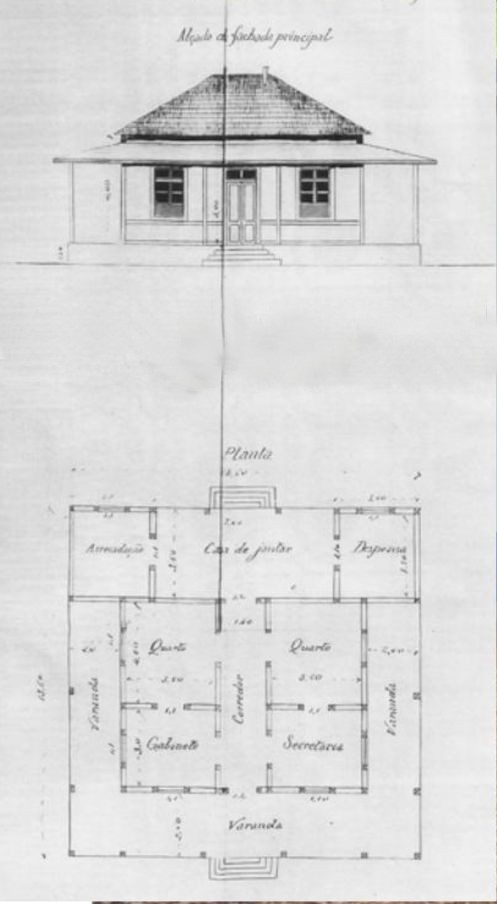
Historical plan of the fort

In 1756, Maubara allied itself with the Dutch. Maubara became a Dutch enclave in Portuguese Timor. In 1758, two ships from Sikka, which was allied with Portugal, attacked Maubara. The Dutch East India Company (VOC) responded by sending two ships from Kupang to support Maubara's ruler José Xavier Doutel. After the successful defense, a unit of one hundred European and Balinese soldiers, under the command of Jacob Pietersz, was sent to Maubara to build the fort. The enclosure now had a diameter of 80 feet and the walls were six feet thick. However, this was not enough of a deterrent. When Pietersz returned to Maubara with fresh soldiers in 1759, he once again had to defend the kingdom against unnamed attackers. The next Portuguese attack took place in 1760. A VOC ship with Mardijkers came to Maubara's aid. That year, the German VOC commander Hans Albrecht von Plüskow lost his life. As a result, almost the entire crew of Fort Maubara was ordered back to Kupang in 1761. Only twelve European soldiers remained behind. Doutel therefore asked for reinforcements in Kupang and Batavia. To emphasize his request, he sent large quantities of sandalwood and beeswax as a gift. The following years remained turbulent. In 1790, the Topasse ruler Pedro da Hornay attacked Maubara on behalf of Portugal. The attack was repulsed. All the Topaz achieved with this action was that Maubara renewed its alliance with the Netherlands and planted the Dutch flag. From 1796 to 1799, Maubara, together with Great Sonba'i, was again at war with the Portuguese.

However, in the Treaty of Lisbon in 1859, the Dutch agreed to cede Maubara to the Portuguese as part of a larger territorial exchange. The handover took place in April 1861. In 1869, the captain of the Portuguese corvette Sa de Bandeira described the fort as being built of loose stones, close to the sea shore, which at this point was only equipped with a single, rusty cannon. Maubara revolted against the Portuguese several times until 1893. A customs station was built in Maubara in 1889. The customs house is still located opposite the fort today.

The building inside the fort dates from the second half of the 20th century and once served as the seat of the local administration of Maubara. Today it houses a restaurant.

== Gallery ==
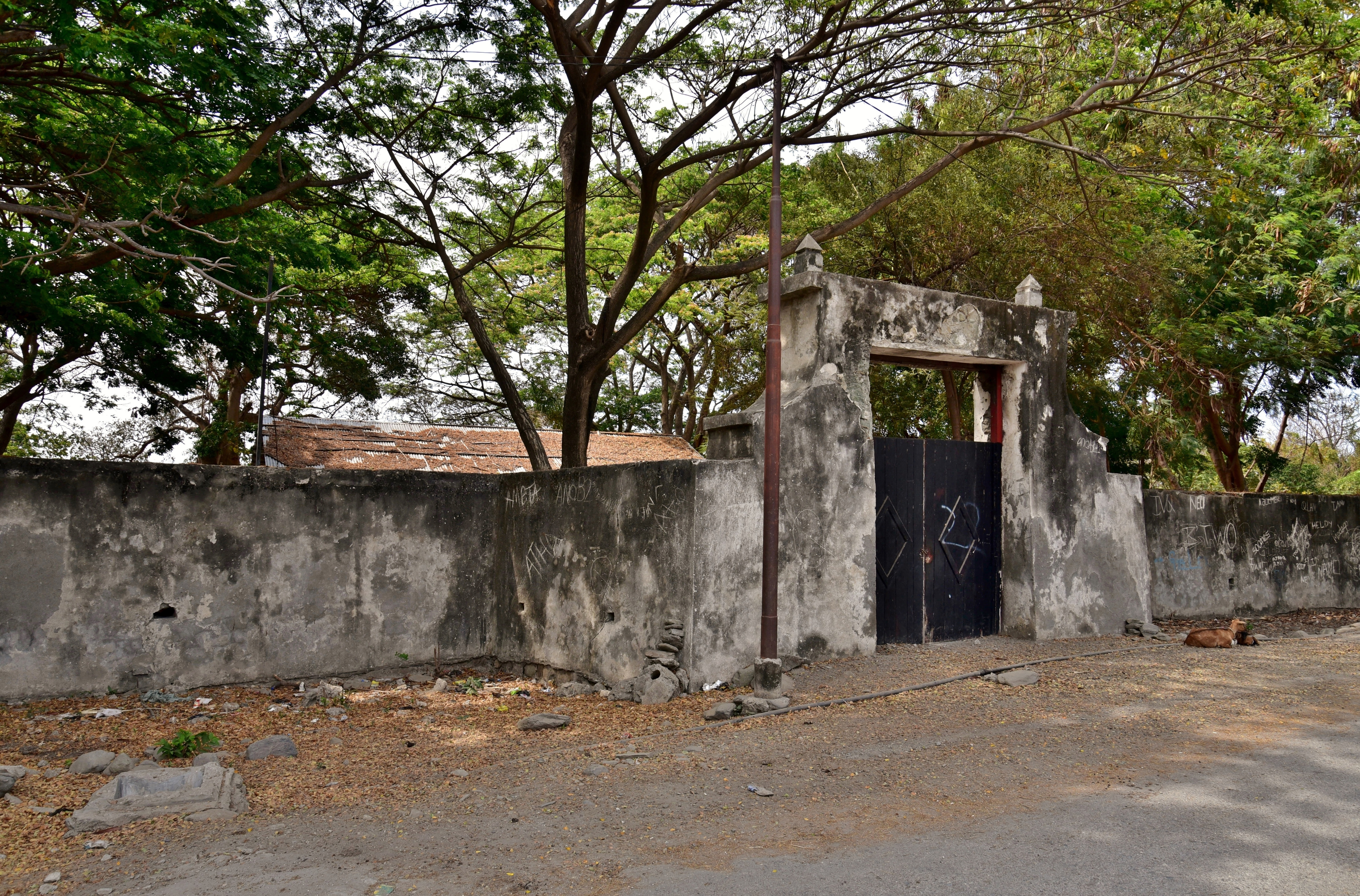
Second gate at the backside

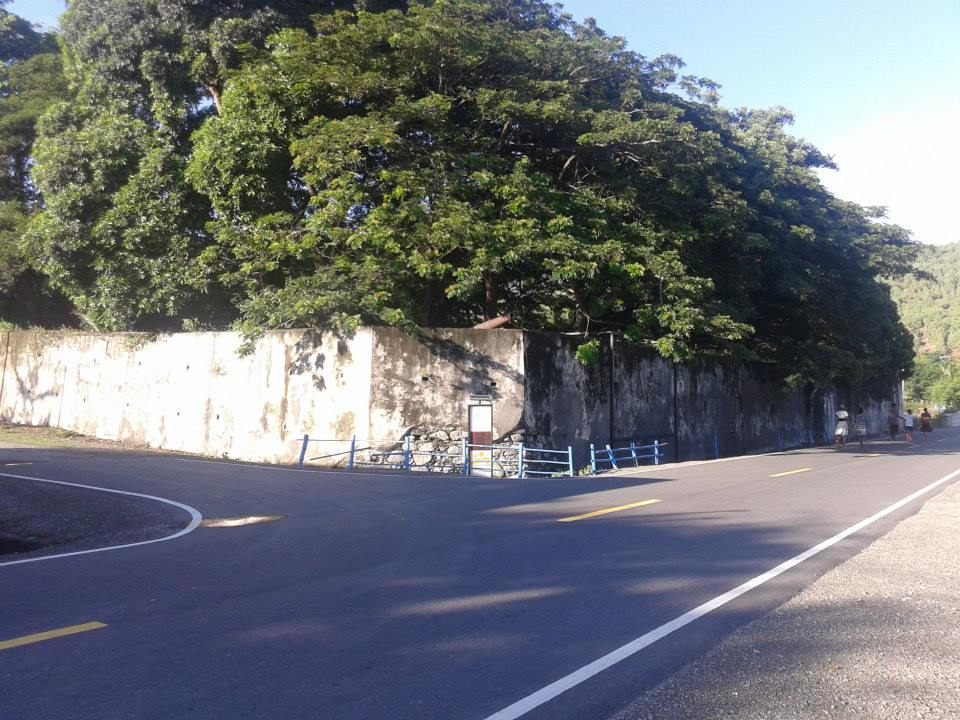
Fort corner by the roadside

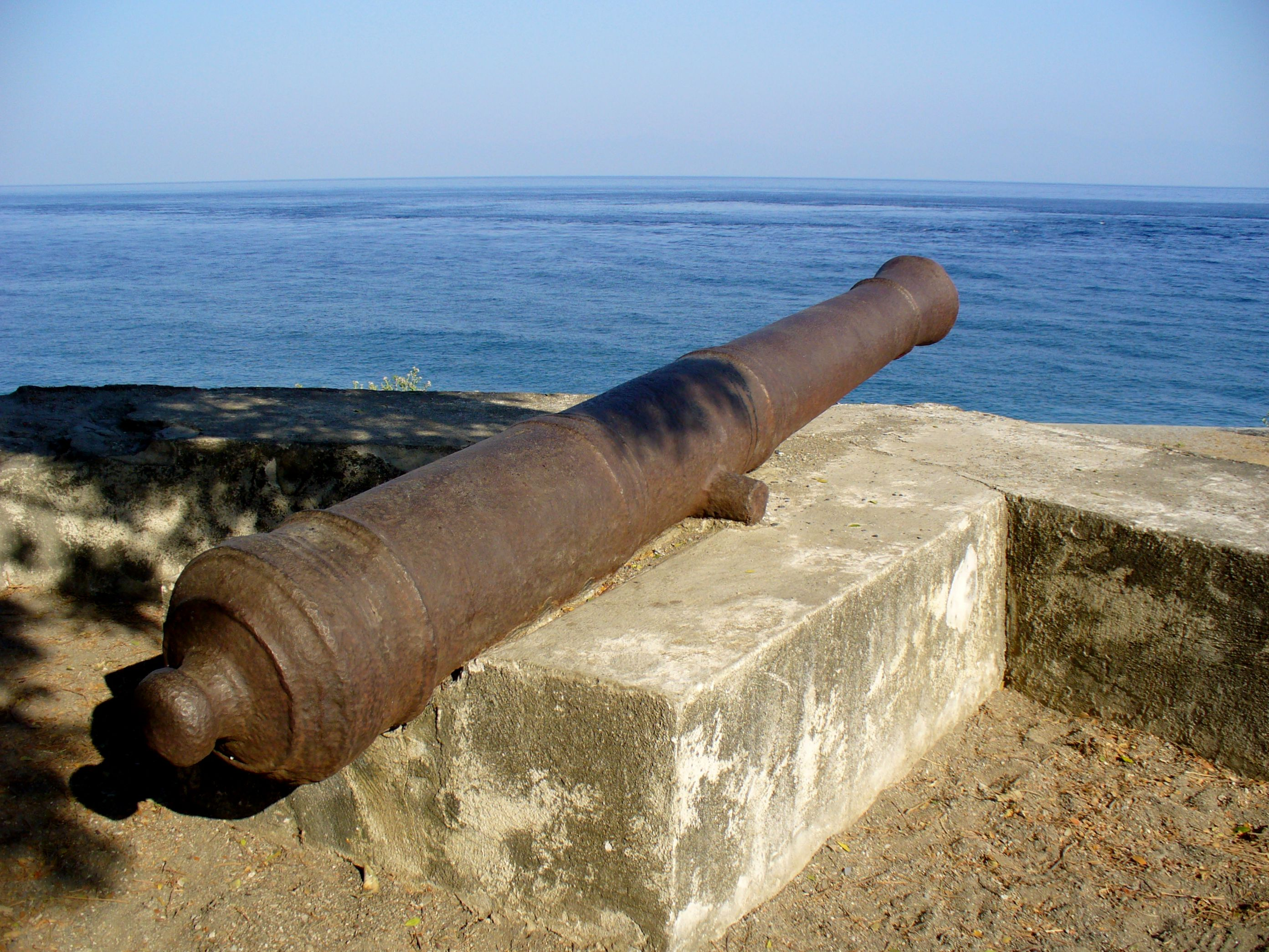
Fort cannon aiming at the sea

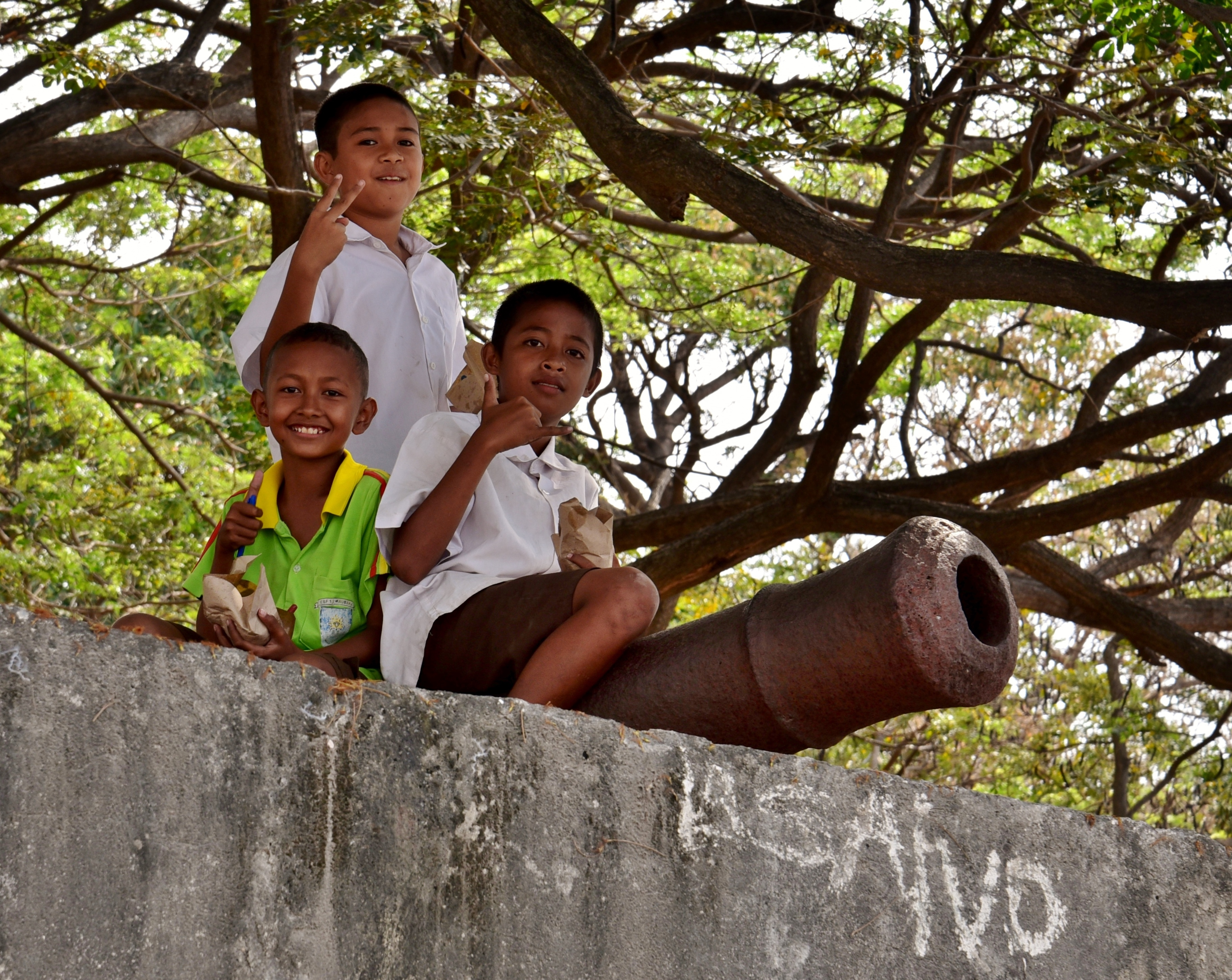
Second cannon

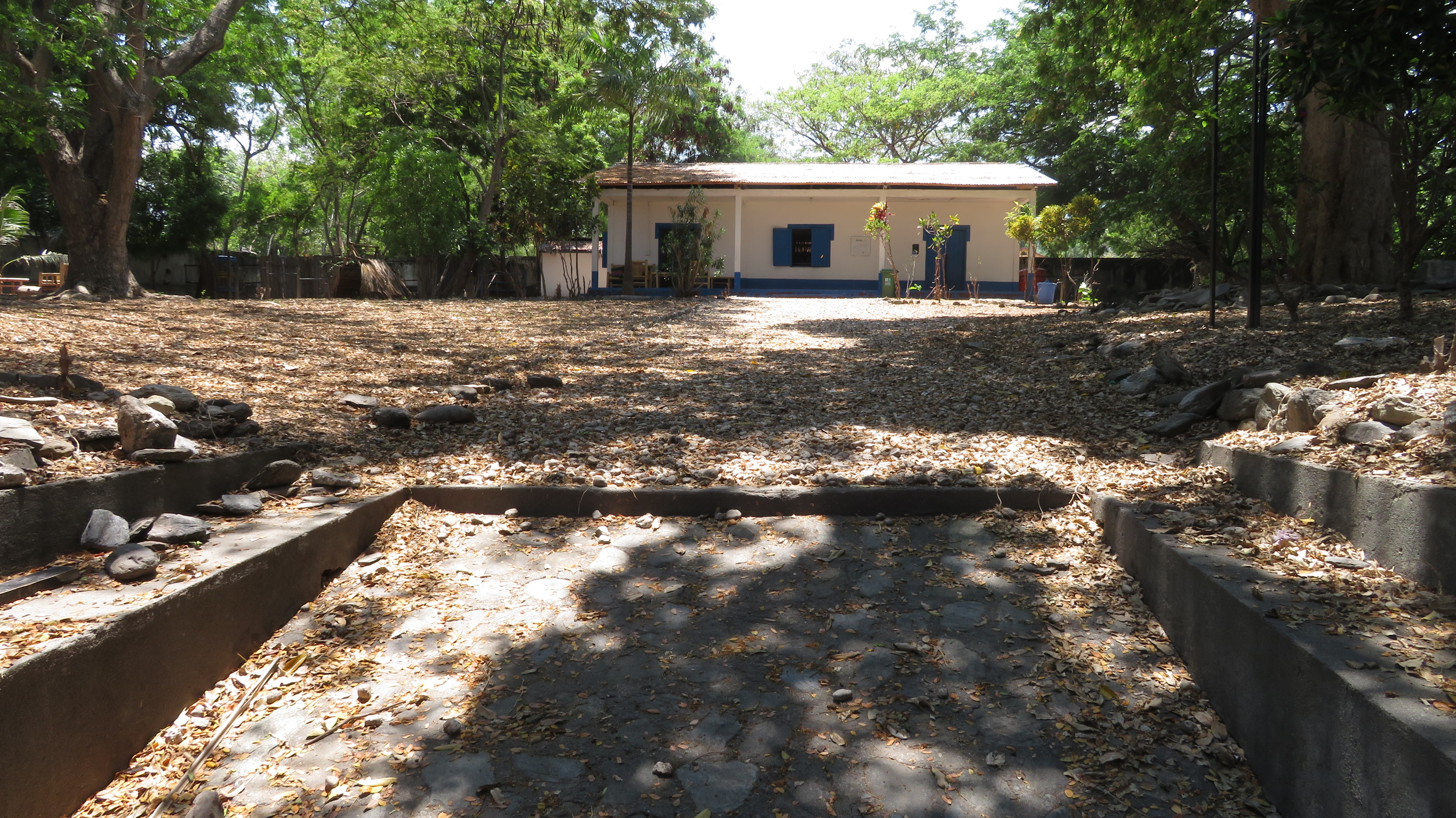
Inside the fortress from the entrance

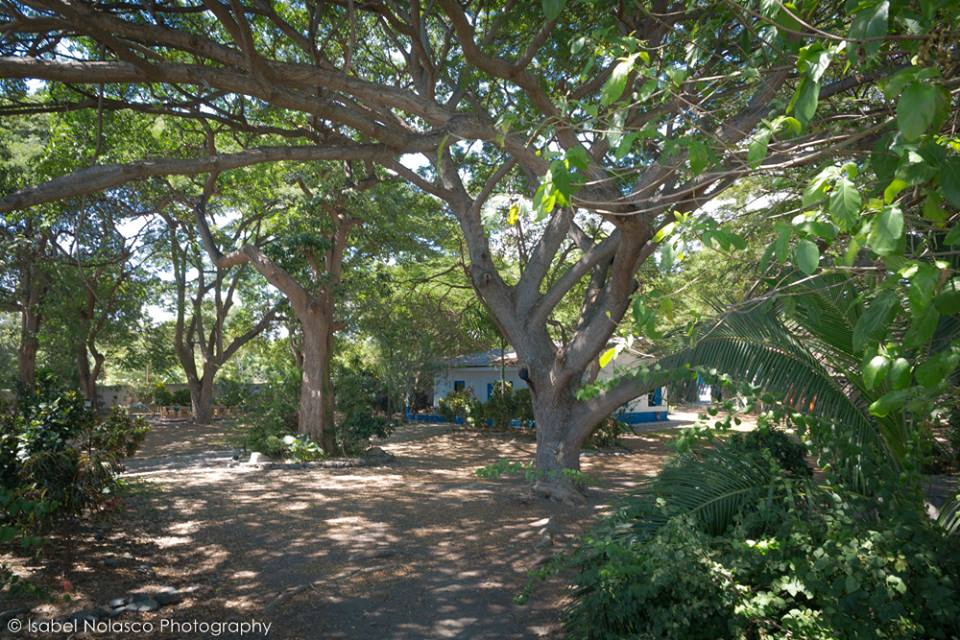
Vegetation inside the fortress
