= Maubara =

Village in East Timor

Maubara Maubere
- Town
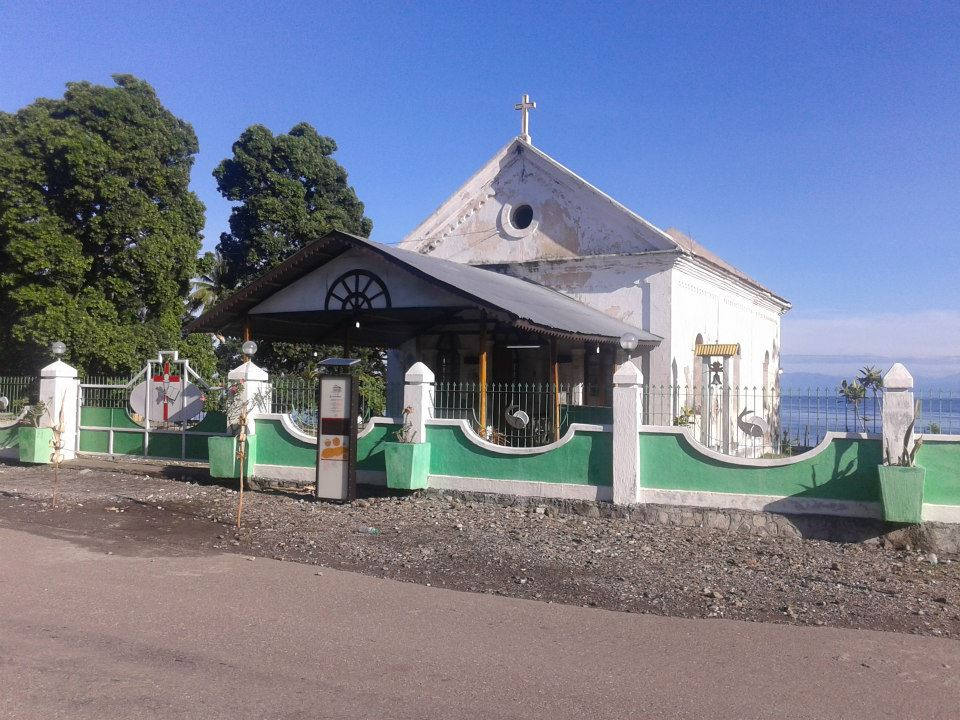
- Maubara Church

- Location in Timor-Leste
- Coordinates: 8°37′S 125°12′E
- Country: Timor-Leste
- Municipality: Liquiçá District
- Elevation: 15 m (49 ft)
- Time zone: UTC+09:00 (TLT)

Maubara is a village in Maubara Administrative Post (Liquiçá Municipality, Timor-Leste), just west of the city of Liquiçá. Most of the inhabitants speak Tocodede. It lies near the Maubara Important Bird Area, encompassing the small coastal Lake Maubara.

== History ==
During the beginning of the Portuguese occupation, it was taken by the Netherlands. There is a historic Dutch fort, Fort Maubara, located at the entrance to the village on the seaside overlooking the bay. Later, Portugal negotiated with Holland and regained the site in a trade for Flores in 1851, which was occupied by the Portuguese at that time.

The village is also the location in which the infamous Besi Merah Putih militia was created. In 2000, on the western outskirts of the village, the UNTAET Crime Scene Detachment conducted sixteen exhumations in two days, most being victims of the Manuel Carrascalão House Massacre in Dili.

== Infrastructure ==
Maubara is linked to Dili by a good road. It has a market place with a small market hall and a health centre. Maubara is the administrative centre of suco de Vaviquinia.

== Buildings ==
Maubara is famous for its fort which was built by the Dutch around 1756. The fort with its two gates still contains the original cannon and is quite well-preserved. The building inside the fort was built in the second half of the 20th century.

The Parish Church of Maubara is a small rectangular building built in a neoclassic style. The construction was organized by Padre Medeiros, the leading priest of the Timor Mission from 1877 to 1897.

The Customs' house (Posto de Alfândega) was built in 1920 opposite the fort on the main road. Today it is used as a cultural centre with a library and a tourist information.

Escola de Padre Medeiros, a former school built in the first half of the 19th century, was torn down by the Diocese of Maliana and rebuilt in the original style as a residential building.

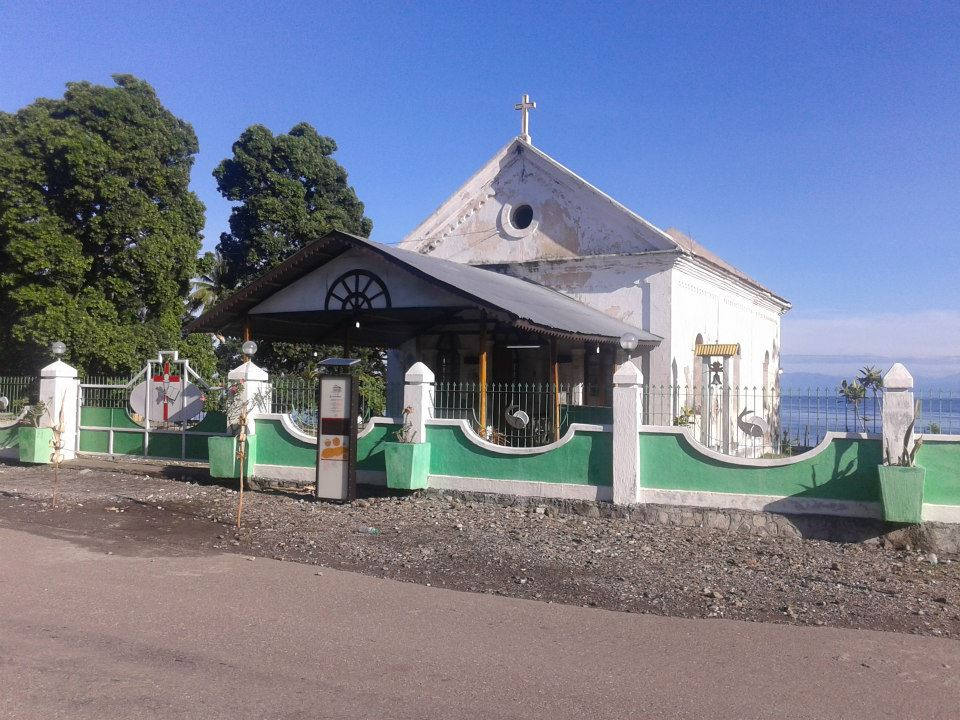
Parish Church of Maubara

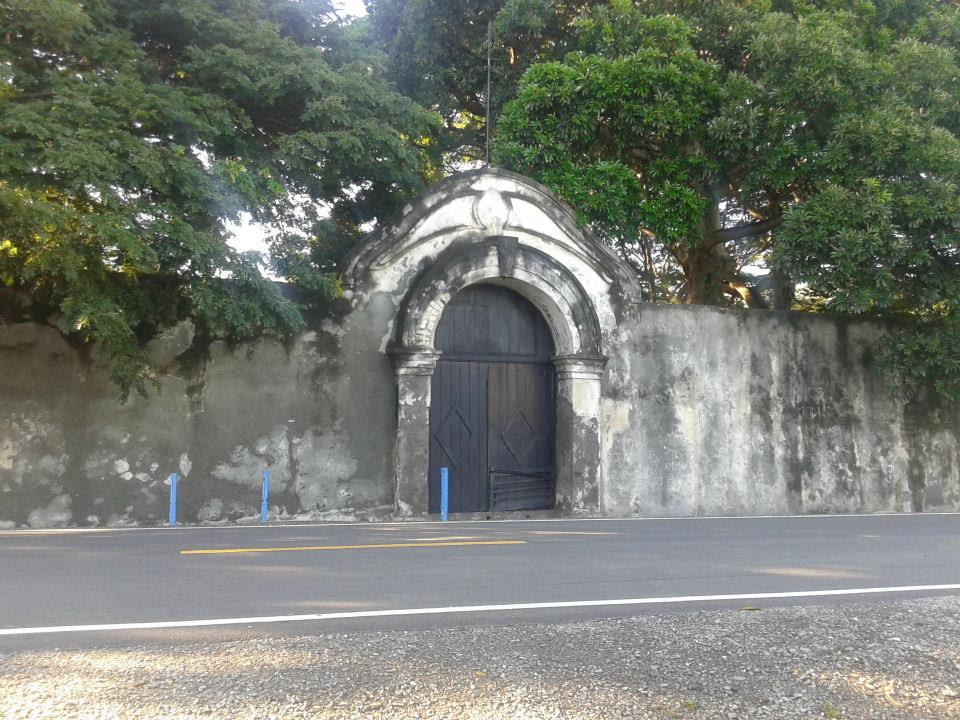
Maubara Fort

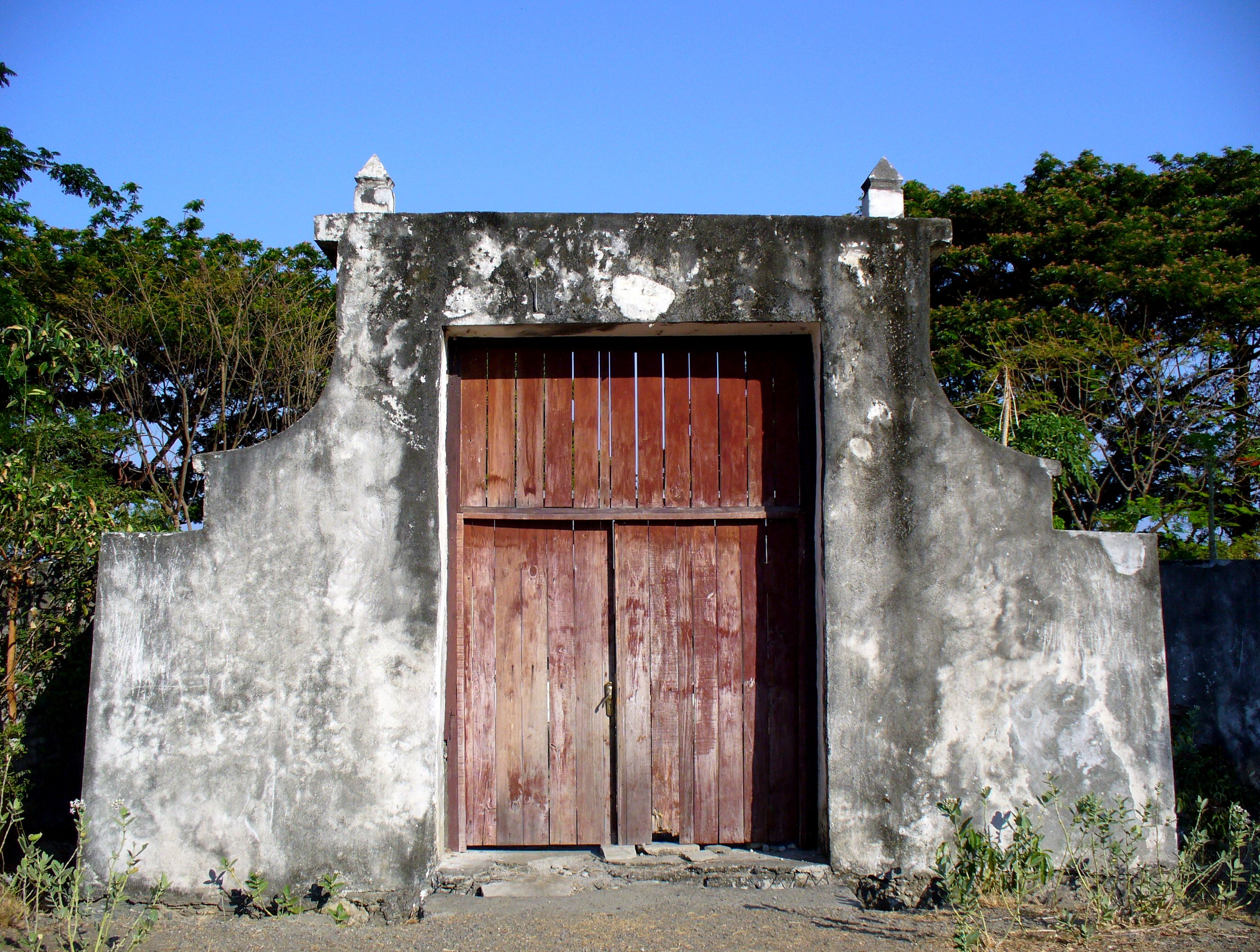
Maubara Fort

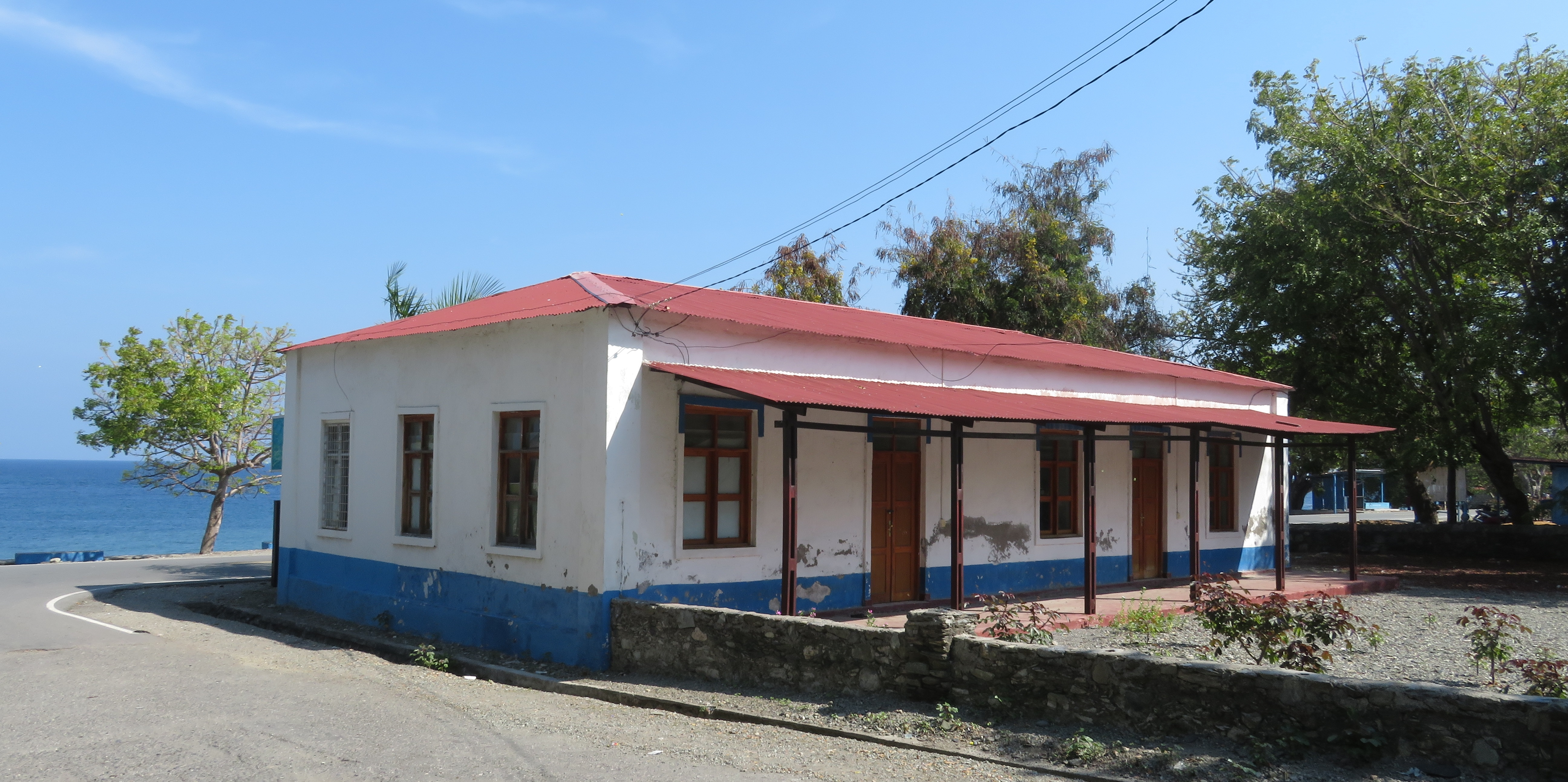
Customs' House

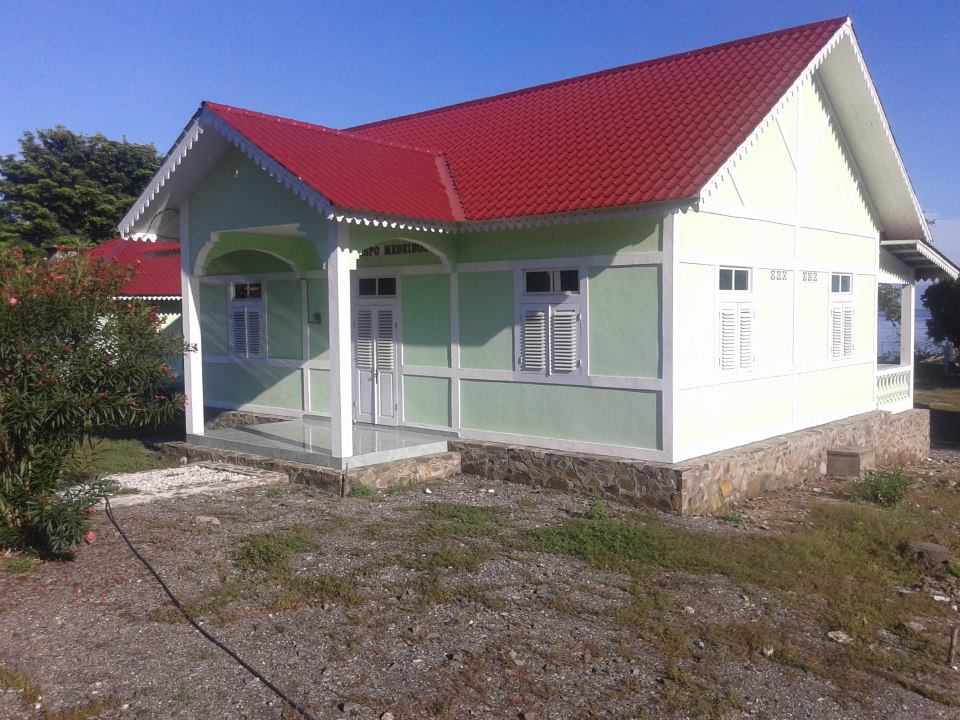
Former School Escola de Padre Medeiros

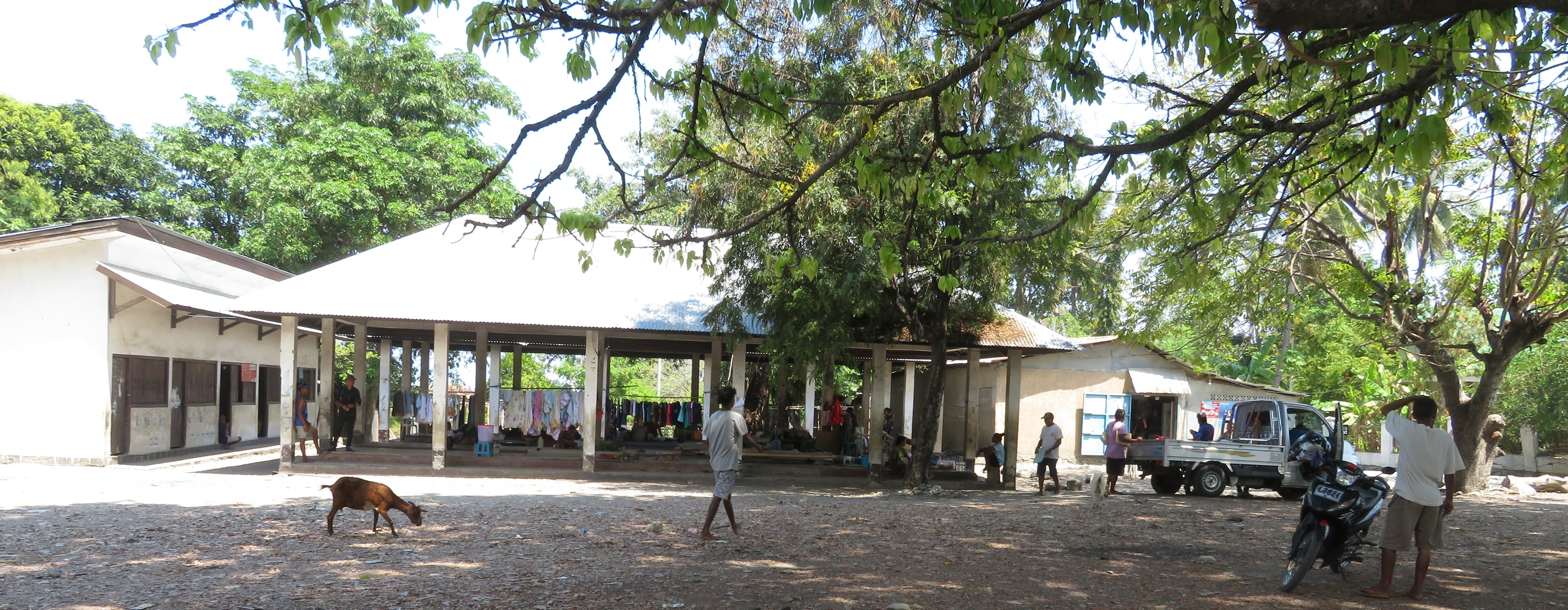
Market Place

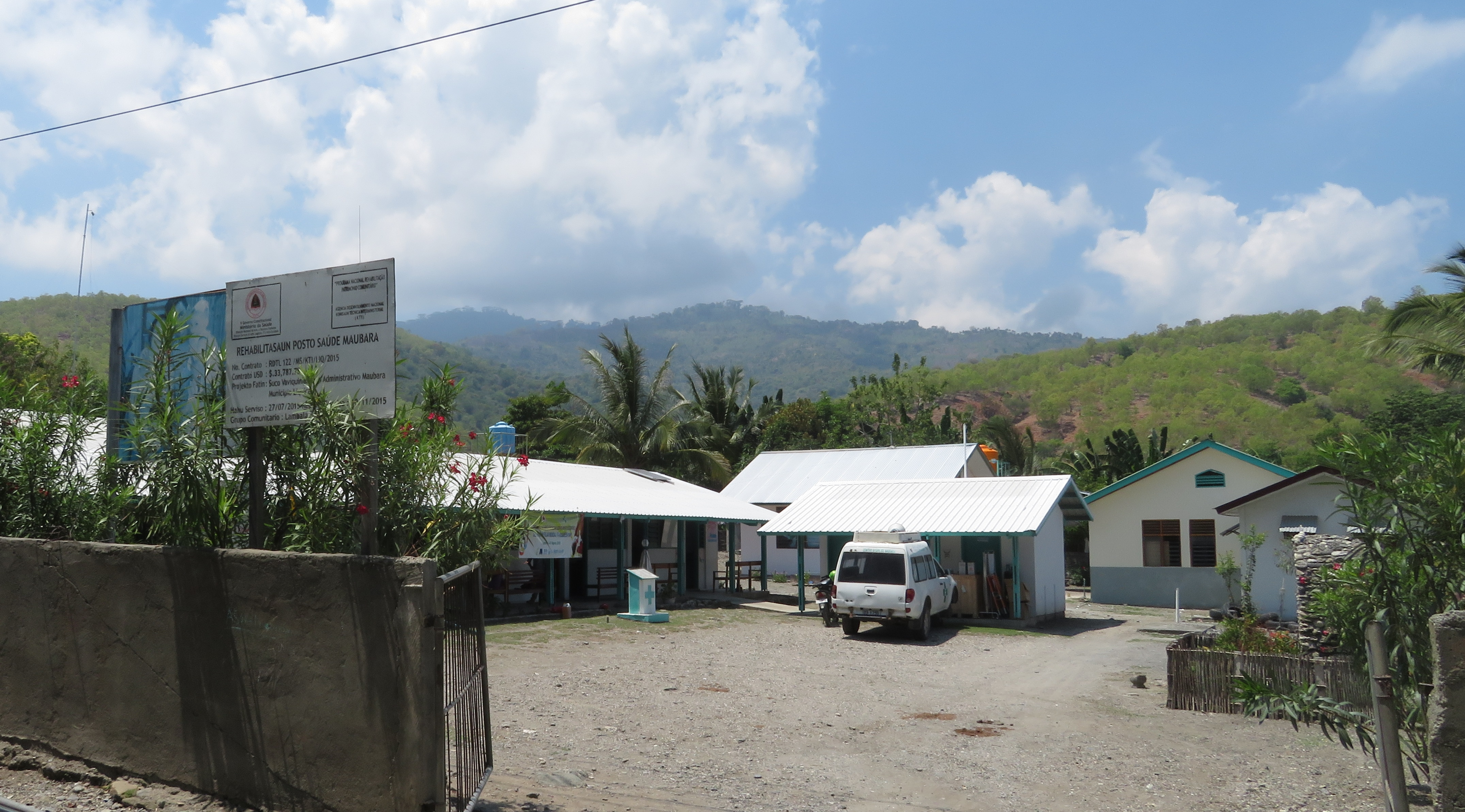
Health Centre

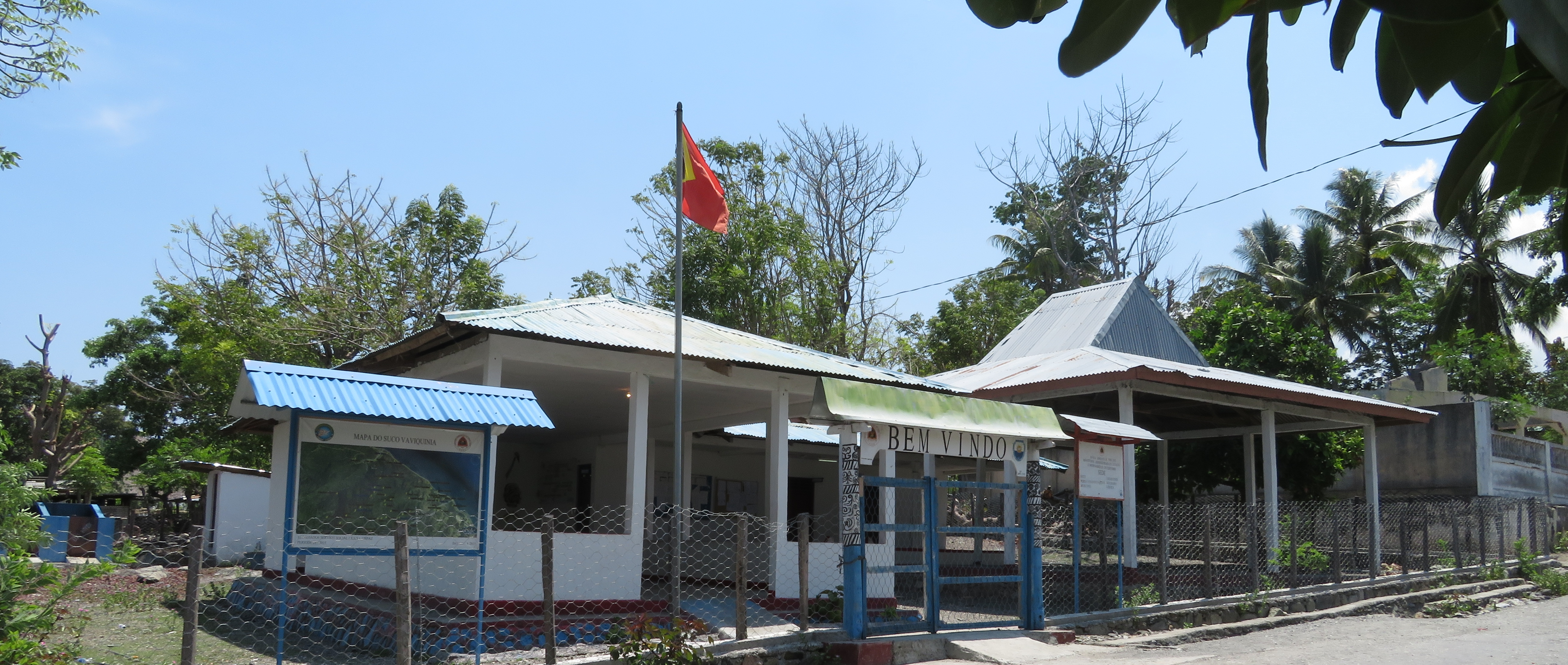
Administration building of the Suco de Vaviquinia
