= List of members of the parliament of Timor-Leste, 2001–07 =

This is a list of members of the National Parliament of East Timor as elected at the 2001 election. They initially sat as the Constituent Assembly before the nation was granted independence in 2002, but reformed themselves into the National Assembly that year.

== District members ==
Thirteen members of the Constituent Assembly were elected by uninominal majority vote to represent the thirteen districts.

District	Name	Party	Notes
Aileu	Alfredo da Silva	Fretilin	
Ainaro	Mário Ferreira	Fretilin	Died on 22 July 2003.
Baucau	Elias Freitas	Fretilin	
Bobonaro	José Andrade da Cruz	Fretilin	
Cova Lima	Gervásio Cardoso de Jesus da Silva	Fretilin	
Dili	Cipriana da Costa Pereira	Fretilin	
Ermera	José Soares	Fretilin	
Lautém	Armindo da Conceição Silva Freitas	Fretilin	
Liquiçá	Joaquim Barros Soares	Fretilin	
Manatuto	Flávio Maria Guterres da Silva	Fretilin	
Manufahi	Arão Noé Amaral	Fretilin	
Oecusse	António da Costa Lelan	Independent	
Viqueque	Januario Soares	Fretilin	

== Party list members ==
Seventy-five members of the Constituent Assembly were elected from party lists by proportional representation.

Name	Party	Notes
Mari Alkatiri	Fretilin	
Lourdes Alves Araújo	Fretilin	
Augusto da Conceição Amaral	Fretilin	
Clementino dos Reis Amaral	Klibur Oan Timor Asuwain	
Francisco Xavier do Amaral	Timorese Social Democratic Association	Resigned 14 March 2005.
Joaquim Amaral	Fretilin	
Jacinto de Andrade	Timorese Social Democratic Association	
Aliança de Araújo	Timorese Nationalist Party	
Fernando de Araújo	Democratic Party	
Paulo Assis Belo	Democratic Party	
Antoninho Bianco	Fretilin	
Francisco Miranda Branco	Fretilin	
Aires Francisco Cabral	Timorese Nationalist Party	
João Viegas Carrascalão	Timorese Democratic Union	
Mário Viegas Carrascalão	Social Democratic Party	
António Tilman Cepeda	Fretilin	
Maria Teresa Hono Lay Correia	Fretilin	
Rosária Corte-Real	Fretilin	
Luisa da Costa	Fretilin	
Maria José da Costa	Fretilin	
Rui António da Cruz	Fretilin	
Vicente Soares Faria	Fretilin	
Feliciano Fátima	Timorese Social Democratic Association	
Jacob Fernandes	Fretilin	
Maria Solana da Conceição Soares Fernandes	Fretilin	
Isabel da Costa Ferreira	Timorese Democratic Union	Resigned 8 October 2001; replaced by Quitéria da Costa.
Osório Florindo	Fretilin	
Ananias do Carmo Fuka	People's Party of Timor	
Pedro Gomes	Timorese Social Democratic Association	
José Maria Barreto Lobato Gonçalves	Fretilin	
Aquilino Fraga Guterres	Democratic Party	
Eusébio Guterres	Democratic Party	
Francisco Guterres	Fretilin	
Vicente da Silva Guterres	Christian Democratic Party	
Leandro Isaac	Social Democratic Party	
Francisco Jerónimo	Fretilin	
Constância de Jesus	Fretilin	
Vidal de Jesus	Social Democratic Party	
Francisco Kalbuadi Lay	Fretilin	
Lúcia Lobato	Social Democratic Party	
Maria Avalziza Lourdes	Fretilin	
Ma'huno Bulerek Karathayano	Fretilin	
António Cardoso Machado	Fretilin	
Adaljiza Magno	Fretilin	
Jacinto Maia	Fretilin	
Arlindo Marçal	Christian Democratic Party	
Maria Genoveva da Costa Martins	Fretilin	
César Vital Moreira	Fretilin	
Afonso Noronha	Timorese Social Democratic Association	
José da Silva Panão	Democratic Party	
Ana Pessoa Pinto	Fretilin	
Milena Pires	Social Democratic Party	Resigned 30 August 2002; replaced by Maria Paixão da Costa from 9 September 2002.
Mariano Sabino Lopes	Democratic Party	
Gregório Saldanha	Fretilin	
Armandina Maria Gusmão Santos	Social Democratic Party	
Joaquim dos Santos	Fretilin	
Manuel Sarmento	Fretilin	
Paulo Alves Sarmento	Democratic Party	
Ana Seixas	Socialist Party of Timor	Resigned 15 September 2001; replaced by Pedro Mártires da Costa.
Armando Jose Dourado da Silva	Liberal Party	
Estanislau da Silva	Fretilin	
Jerónimo da Silva	Fretilin	
Madalena da Silva	Fretilin	
Adérito de Jesus Soares	Fretilin	
Francisco Carlos Soares	Fretilin	
Josefa Álvares Pereira Soares	Fretilin	
Miguel Soares	Fretilin	
Manuel Tilman	Klibur Oan Timor Asuwain	
Jorge Teme	Fretilin	
Maria Valadares	Timorese Social Democratic Association	
Maria Terezinha Viegas	Fretilin	
Jacob Xavier	People's Party of Timor	
Adalgisa Ximenes	Fretilin	
António Ximenes	Christian Democratic Party	
Judite Dias Ximenes	Fretilin	
