= Constitution of Timor-Leste =

Constitution of the Democratic Republic of Timor-Leste Portuguese: Constituição da República Democrática de Timor-Leste Tetum: Konstituisaun Repúblika Demokrátika Timor-Leste
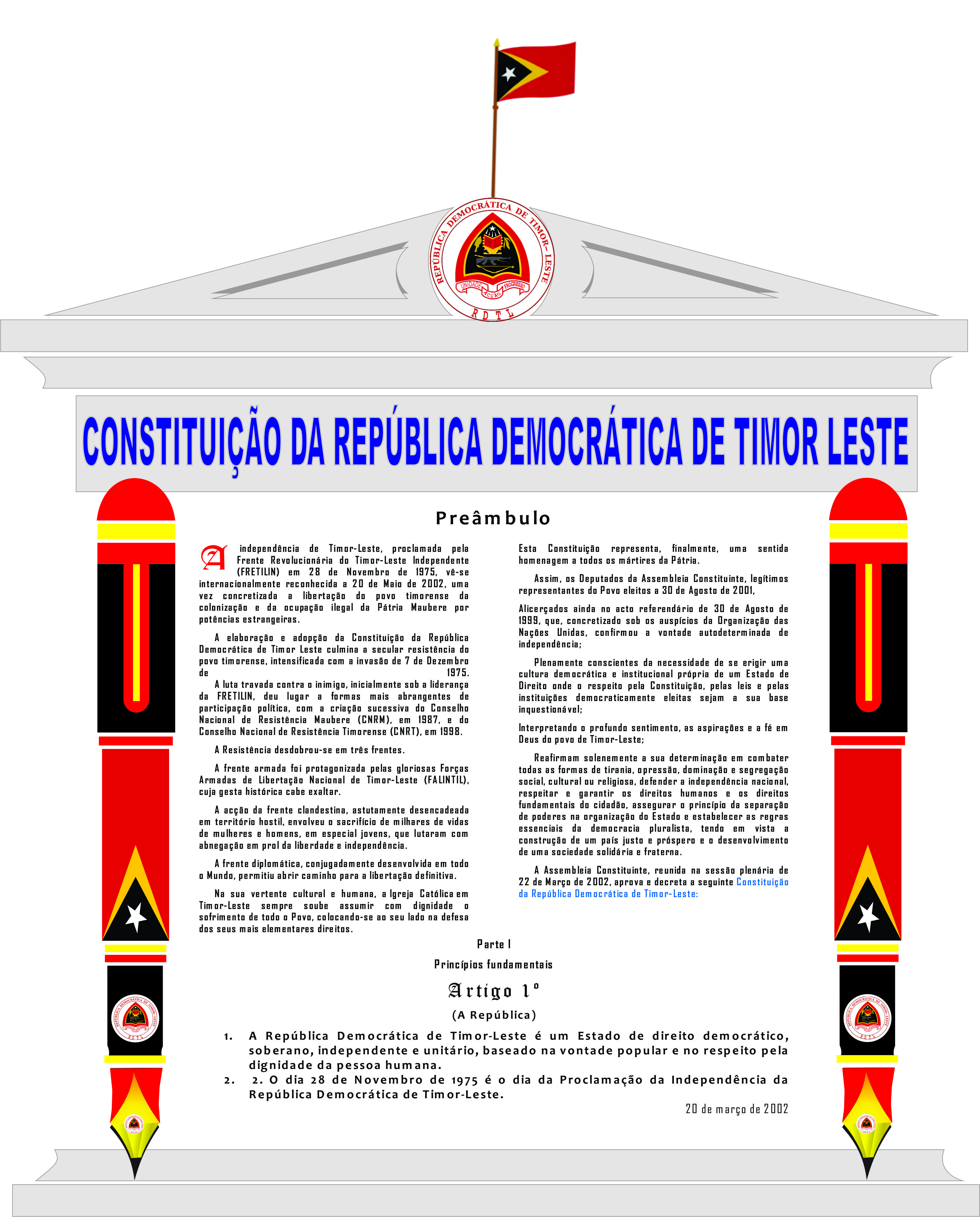
- Preamble and article 1.
- Created: 2002
- Ratified: 20 May 2002
- Author: Constituent Assembly of Timor-Leste
- Signatories: Constituent Assembly
- Purpose: National constitution

The Constitution of Timor-Leste entered into force on 20 May 2002, and was the country's first constitution after it gained independence from Portugal in 1975 and from Indonesia, which invaded East Timor on 7 December 1975 and left in 1999 following a UN-sponsored referendum.

== History ==
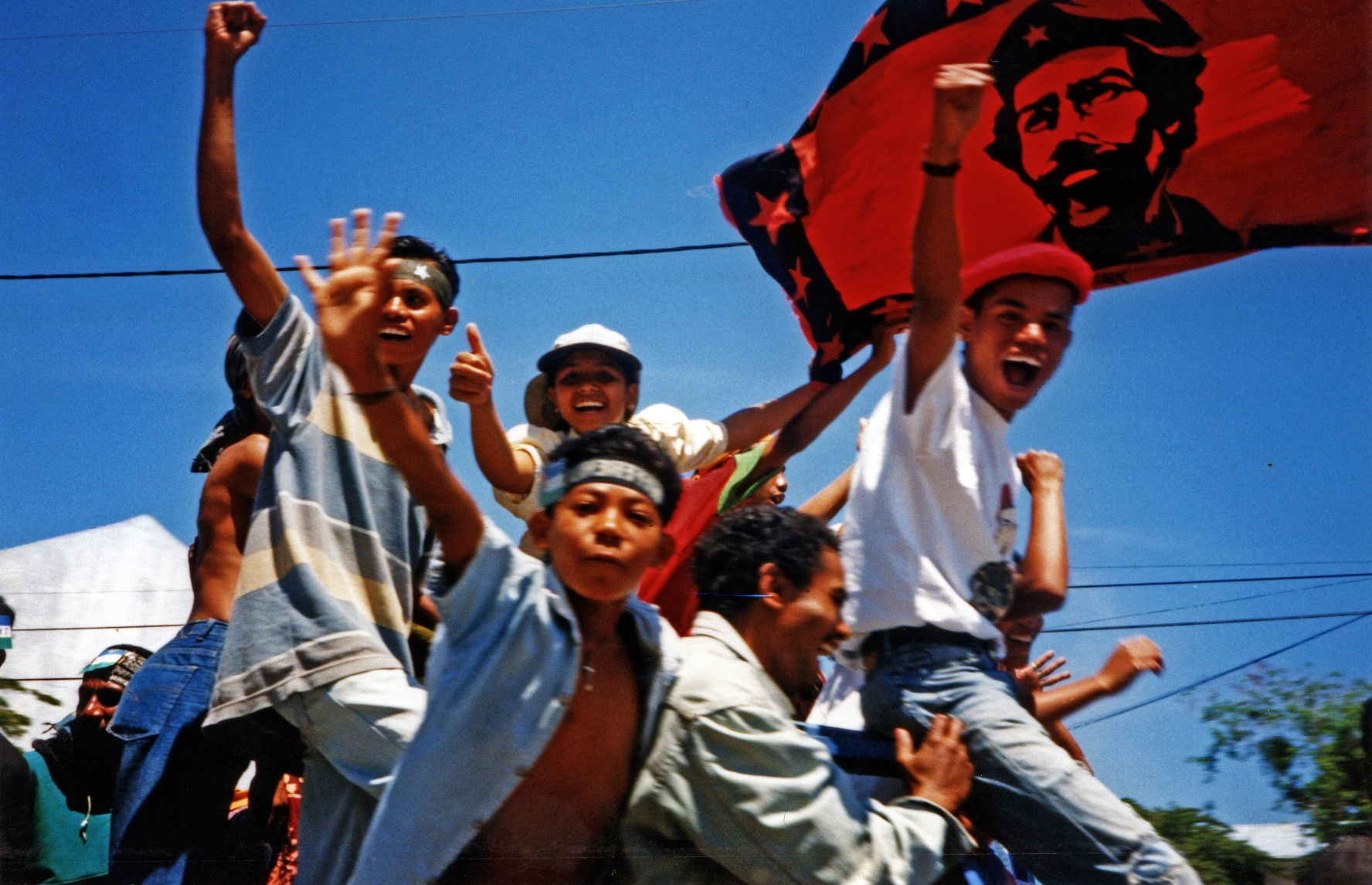
Pro-independence activists during the 1999 independence referendum

After the Carnation Revolution in Portugal in 1974, the colony of Portuguese Timor was to be prepared for independence. In 1975, however, civil war broke out between the two major parties in the country, from which Fretilin emerged victorious. Since the Portuguese administration had withdrawn and Indonesia began to occupy the border area of East Timor, the Fretilin unilaterally proclaimed independence on 28 November 1975. A first constitution was also drafted. But on 7 December, Indonesia began an open invasion. Troops landed in the capital Dili and the Fretilin began guerrilla warfare against the occupiers. In 1976, Indonesia annexed East Timor in violation of international law. Only after 24 years of guerrilla war, a referendum held under the supervision of the United Nations, in which the majority of the population spoke out against autonomy within Indonesia and in favour of East Timor's independence. Once again, there was a wave of violence by Indonesian security forces and pro-Indonesian militias. The international intervention force INTERFET under Australian leadership restored peace and order and East Timor came under UN administration until it was granted independence on 20 May 2002.

The constitution differs from the 1975 constitution, the new version being modelled on the Portuguese one. The Constitution was drafted by the Constituent Assembly elected for this purpose in 2001. Pursuant to an UNTAET regulation, the constitution did not need support in a referendum, but entered into force on the day of independence of Timor-Leste after it was approved by the assembly. Fretilin won an absolute majority of seats. With the transition to independence, the Assembly became the National Parliament of Timor-Leste. There was no separate referendum for the constitution. It was only approved by the Assembly on 22 March 2002 by 65 votes to 14. The Fretilin and ASDT MPs voted in favour of the draft constitution, while the Democratic Party (PD), Social Democratic Party (PSD), and one Timorese Democratic Union (UDT) MP voted against it. Many MPs also did not turn up for the vote.

Pedro Bacelar de Vasconcelos, one of the authors of the constitution, together with a team of authors, published an annotated version of the constitution in 2011 at the Law Faculty of the University of Minho, taking into account the rulings issued up to that time.

== The Constitution ==
The official text of the Constitution is in Portuguese. There are at least four different translations into Tetum, the other official language, published by State institutions. Some of the Tetum translations have gross mistakes.

=== Preamble ===
The preamble looks back on the history of the "Maubere homeland" and names the creation and adoption of the constitution as the culmination of the "historic resistance of the Timorese people" after the invasion of December 7, 1975. The role of Fretilin is mentioned in the preamble, National Council of Maubere Resistance (CNRT) and Timor Leste Defence Force (FALINTIL) in the liberation struggle and its thousands of victims, but also the diplomatic front where East Timorese campaigned for the independence of their country with the international community, and the Catholic Church. Finally follows a commitment to democracy, multi-party system, human rights, fundamental rights and the struggle against tyranny and for national independence.

After which, the Constitution consists of seven parts, namely:

=== Part I: Basic Principles ===
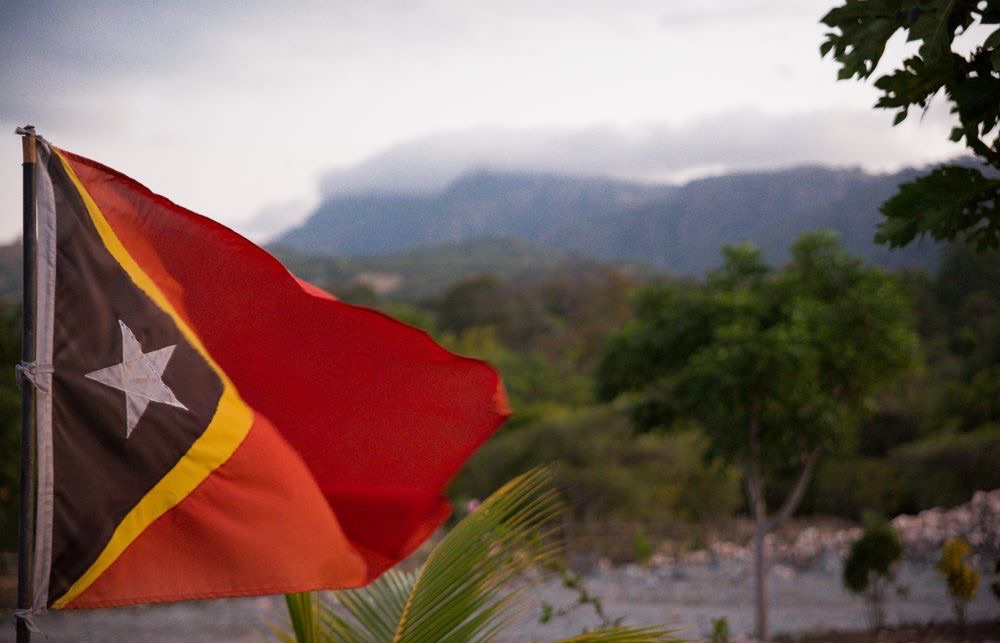
Set out in Section 15: The National Flag of Timor-Leste

  - Section 1: The Republic
  - Section 2: Sovereignty and Constitutionality
  - Section 3: Citizenship
  - Section 4: Territory
  - Section 5: Decentralization
  - Section 6: Principles of the State
  - Section 7: Universal Suffrage and Multiparty System
  - Section 8: International Relations
  - Section 9: International Law
  - Section 10: Solidarity
  - Section 11: Promotion of the Resistance Movement
  - Section 12: State and Religious Beliefs
  - Section 13: Official and National Languages
  - Section 14: National Symbols
  - Section 15: National Flag

=== Part II: Fundamental Rights, Duties, Freedoms and Guarantees ===
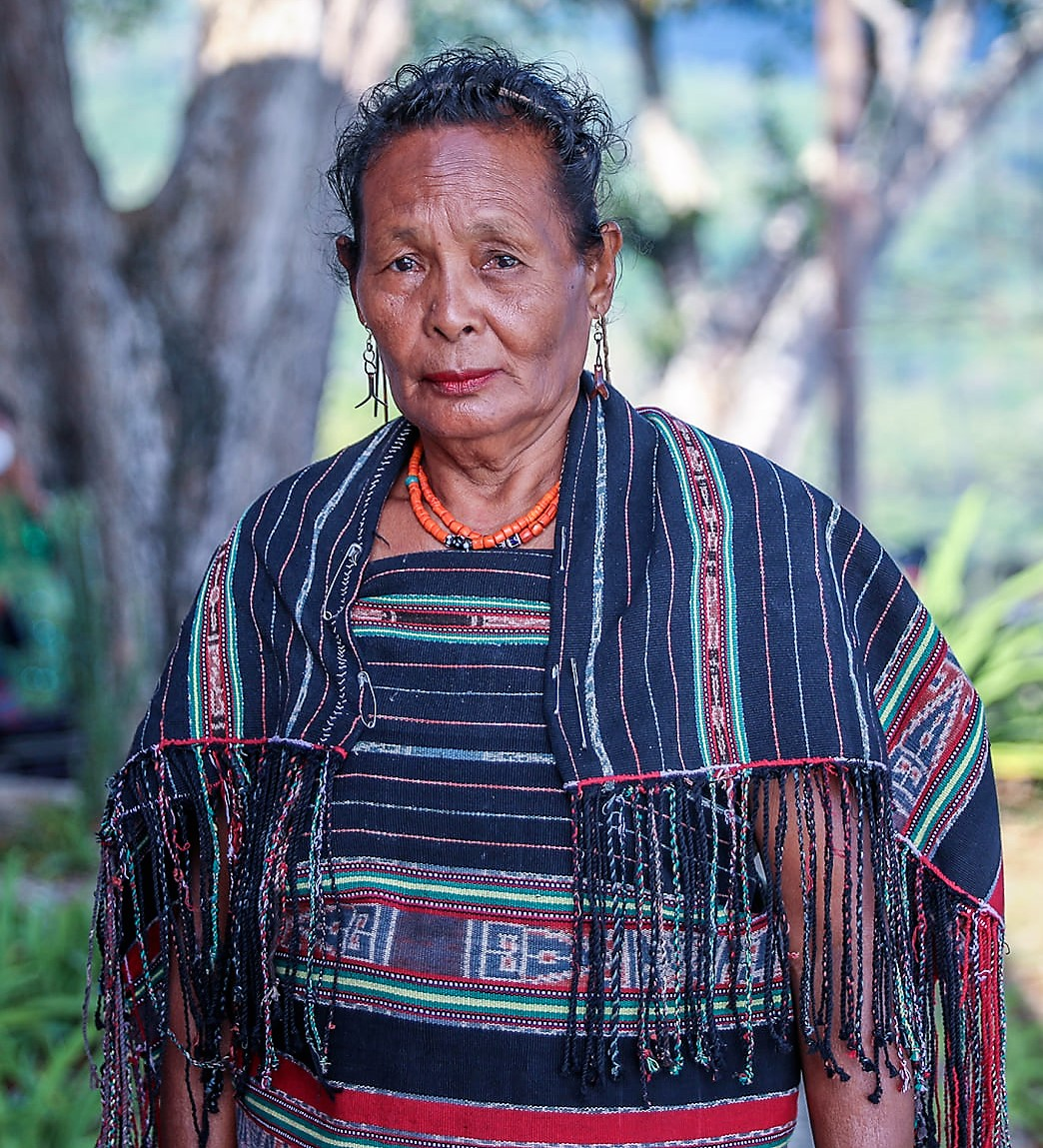
According to the constitution in Timor-Leste, women are equal to men

- Title I: Basic Principles
  - Section 16: Universality and Equivalency
  - Section 17: Equality between women and men
  - Section 18: Child Protection
  - Section 19: Youth
  - Section 20: Seniors
  - Section 21: Disabled Citizens
  - Section 22: Overseas Citizens of Timor-Leste
  - Section 23: Interpretation of Fundamental Rights
  - Section 24: Restrictive Laws
  - Section 25: State of Emergency
  - Section 26: Access to Court
  - Section 27: Ombudsman Board
  - Section 28: Right to Resistance and Self-Defense
- Title II: Personal rights, liberties and guarantees
  - Section 29: Right to Life
  - Section 30: Right to Personal Liberties, Security and Integrity
  - Section 31: Application of Criminal Law
  - Section 32: Sentential Limits and Safeguards
  - Section 33: Habeas Corpus
  - Section 34: Safeguards in Criminal Prosecution
  - Section 35: Extradition and Expulsion
  - Section 36: Right to honor and privacy
  - Section 37: Inviolability of the home and correspondence
  - Section 38: Protection of Personal Information
  - Section 39: Family, Marriage and Maternity
  - Section 40: Freedom of Speech and Information
  - Section 41: Freedom of the Press and Mass Media
  - Section 42: Freedom of assembly and right to demonstrate
  - Section 43: Freedom of Association
  - Section 44: Freedom of Movement
  - Section 45: Freedom of conscience, belief and religion
  - Section 46: Right to Political Participation
  - Section 47: Right to Suffrage
  - Section 48: Right of Petition
  - Section 49: Defense of Sovereignty
- Title III: Economic, Social and Cultural Rights and Obligations
  - Section 50: Right to work
  - Section 51: Right to Strike and Ban on Lockouts
  - Section 52: Freedom of trade unions
  - Section 53: Consumer Rights
  - Section 54: Right to Private Property
  - Section 55: Taxpayer's Obligations
  - Section 56: Social Security and Assistance
  - Section 57: Health
  - Section 58: Housing
  - Section 59: Education and Culture
  - Section 60: Intellectual Property
  - Section 61: Environment

=== Part III: Organization of Political Forces ===
- Title I: General Principles
  - Section 62: Source and exercise of power
  - Section 63: Civic Participation in Political Life
  - Section 64: Principle of Renewal
  - Section 65: Elections
  - Section 66: Referendum
  - Section 67: Organs of State Sovereignty
  - Section 68: Incompatibilities
  - Section 69: Principle of Separation of Powers
  - Section 70: Political parties and right of opposition
  - Section 71: Organization of Administration
  - Section 72: Local Government
  - Section 73: Publication of Legislation and Decisions

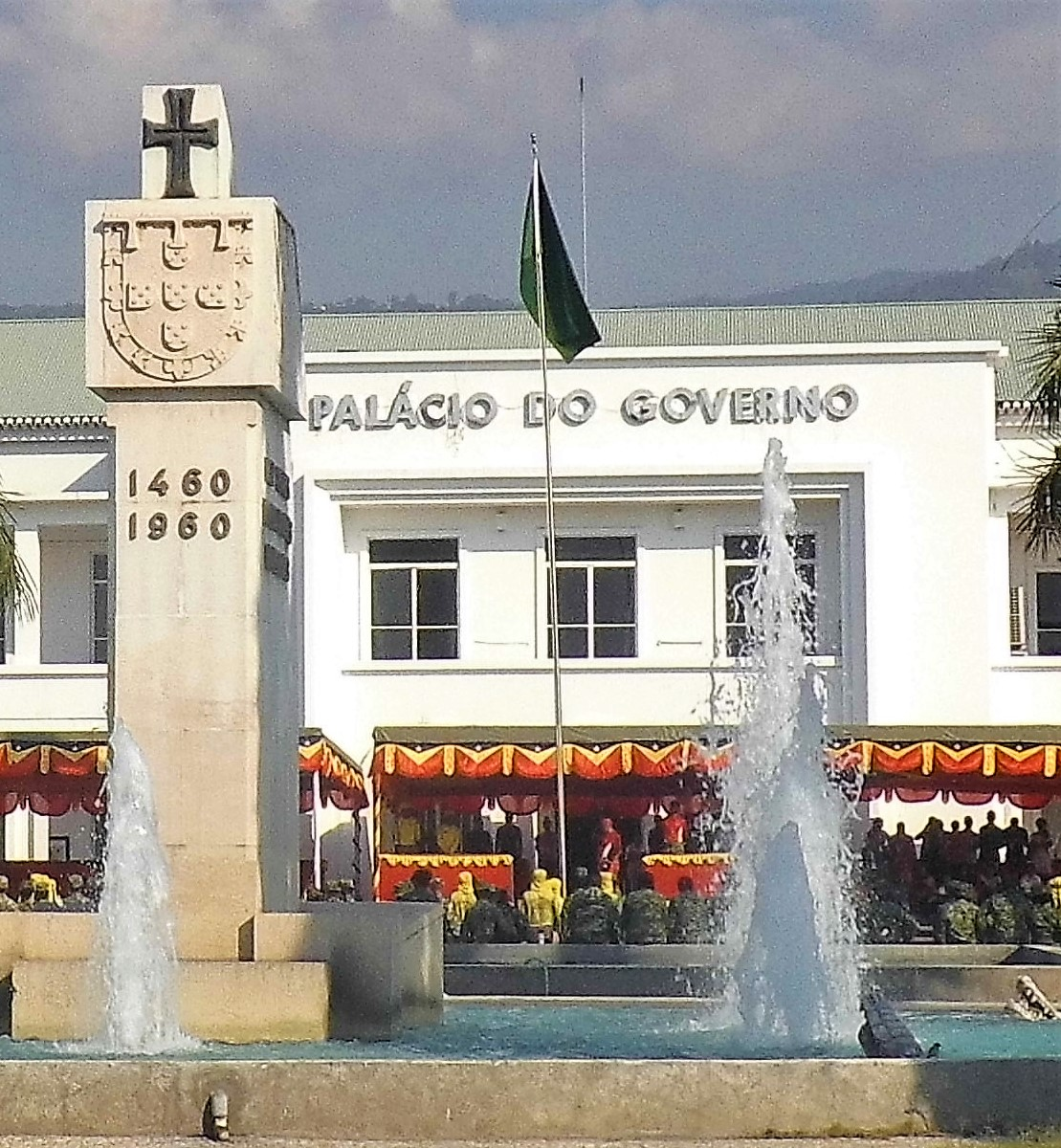
Nicolau Lobato Presidential Palace

- Title II: President of the Republic
  - Chapter I: Status, Election and Appointment
    - Section 74: Definition
    - Section 75: Eligibility
    - Section 76: Election
    - Section 77: Inauguration and Swearing-In
    - Section 78: Incompatibilities
    - Section 79: Criminal liability and constitutional obligations
    - Section 80: Absence
    - Section 81: Resignation from Office
    - Section 82: Death, Resignation or Permanent Disability
    - Section 83: Exceptional Cases
    - Section 84: Exchange and Representation in Office
  - Chapter II: Competences
    - Section 85: Competences
    - Section 86: Competences in relation to other constitutional bodies
    - Section 87: International Relations Competences
    - Section 88: Notices and Veto
    - Section 89: Powers of the Interim President of the Republic
  - Chapter III: Council of State
    - Section 90: Council of State
    - Section 91: Powers, Organization and Function of the State Council

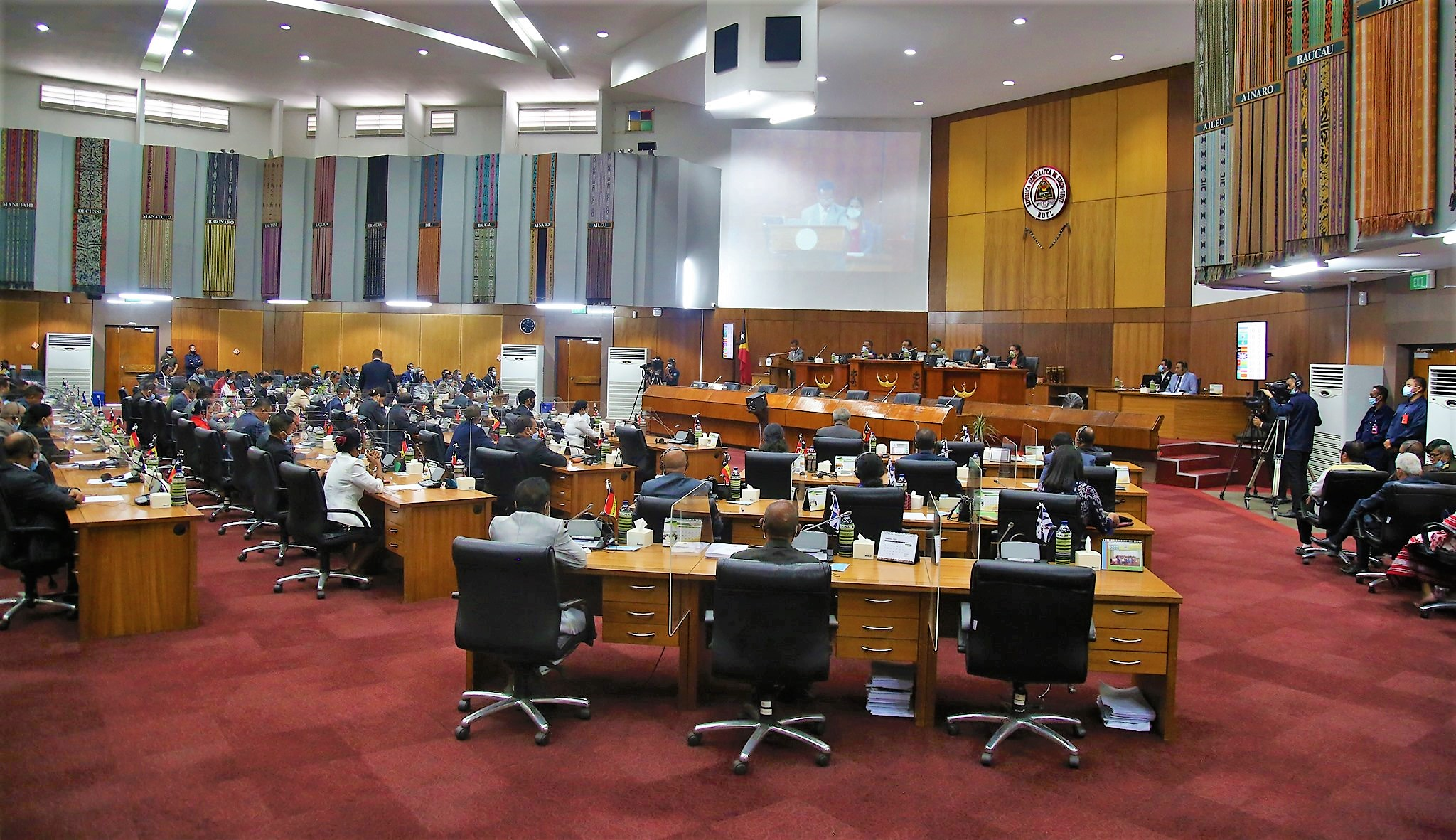
National Parliament of Timor-Leste (2002)

- Title III: National Parliament
  - Chapter I: Status and Choice
    - Section 92: Definition
    - Section 93: Election and Composition
    - Section 94: Immunity
  - Chapter II: Competences
    - Section 95: Powers of the National Parliament
    - Section 96: Legislative Power
    - Section 97: Legislative Initiative
    - Section 98: Parliamentary Evaluation of Laws
  - Chapter III: Organization and function
    - Section 99: Legislature
    - Section 100: Resolution
    - Section 101: Presence of Members of Government

Attendance by members of the Government

  - Chapter IV: Standing Committee
    - Section 102: Standing Committee

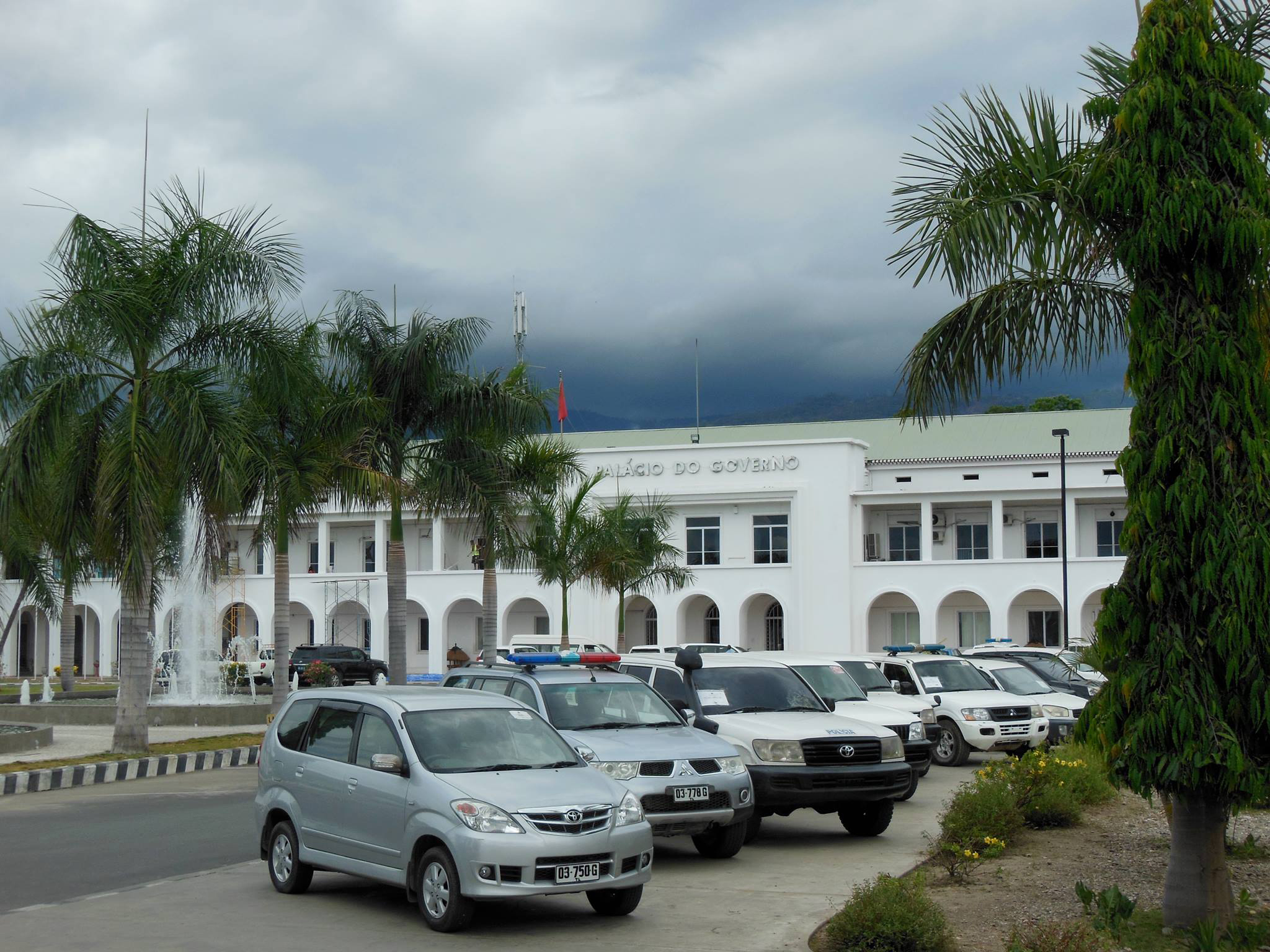
Timor-Leste Government Palace

- Title IV: Government
  - Chapter I: Definition and Structure
    - Section 103: Definition
    - Section 104: Composition
    - Section 105: Council of Ministers
  - Chapter II: Education and Responsibilities
    - Section 106: Appointment
    - Section 107: Responsibilities of Government
    - Section 108: Government Program
    - Section 109: Audit of Government Program
    - Section 110: Call for a vote of confidence
    - Section 111: Vote of No Confidence
    - Section 112: Government Dismissal
    - Section 113: Criminal liability of members of the government
    - Section 114: Immunities of Government Members
  - Chapter III: Competences
    - Section 115: Powers of Government
    - Section 116: Competences of the Council of Ministers
    - Section 117: Powers of Government Members

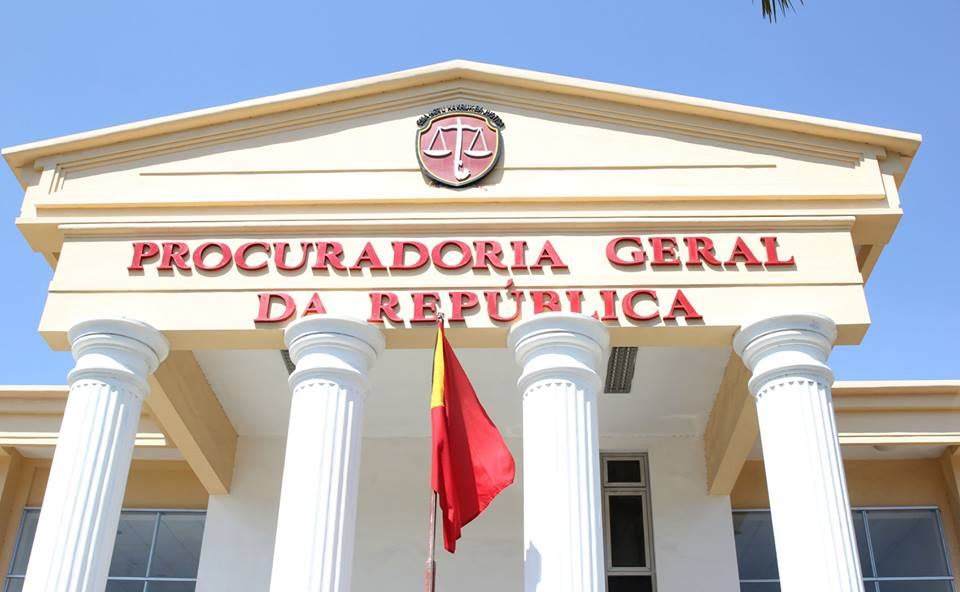
Attorney General's Office

- Title V: Courts
  - Chapter I: Courts, prosecutors and attorneys
    - Section 118: Jurisdiction
    - Section 119: Independence
    - Section 120: Testing for Unconstitutionality
    - Section 121: Judges
    - Section 122: Exclusivity
    - Section 123: Categories of Courts
    - Section 124: Supreme Court
    - Section 125: Function and Composition
    - Section 126: Electoral and constitutional powers
    - Section 127: Qualification
    - Section 128: Supreme Judicial Council
    - Section 129: Supreme Administrative Court, Finance Court and Audit Court
    - Section 130: Military Court
    - Section 131: Legal Proceedings
  - Chapter II: Public Prosecutor's Office
    - Section 132: Function and Status
    - Section 133: Attorney General's Office
    - Section 134: Supreme Council of Attorneys General
  - Chapter III: Lawyers
    - Section 135: Solicitors
    - Section 136: Guarantees for Legal Practice
- Title VI: Public Administration
- Section 137: General Principles for Public Administration

=== Part IV: Organization of Economics and Finance ===
- Title I: General Principles
  - Section 138: Organization of the Economy
  - Section 139: Natural Resources
  - Section 140: Investments
  - Section 141: Land
- Title II: Financial and tax system
  - Section 142: Financial System
  - Section 143: Central Bank
  - Section 144: Control System
  - Section 145: State Budget

=== Part V: National Defense and Security ===
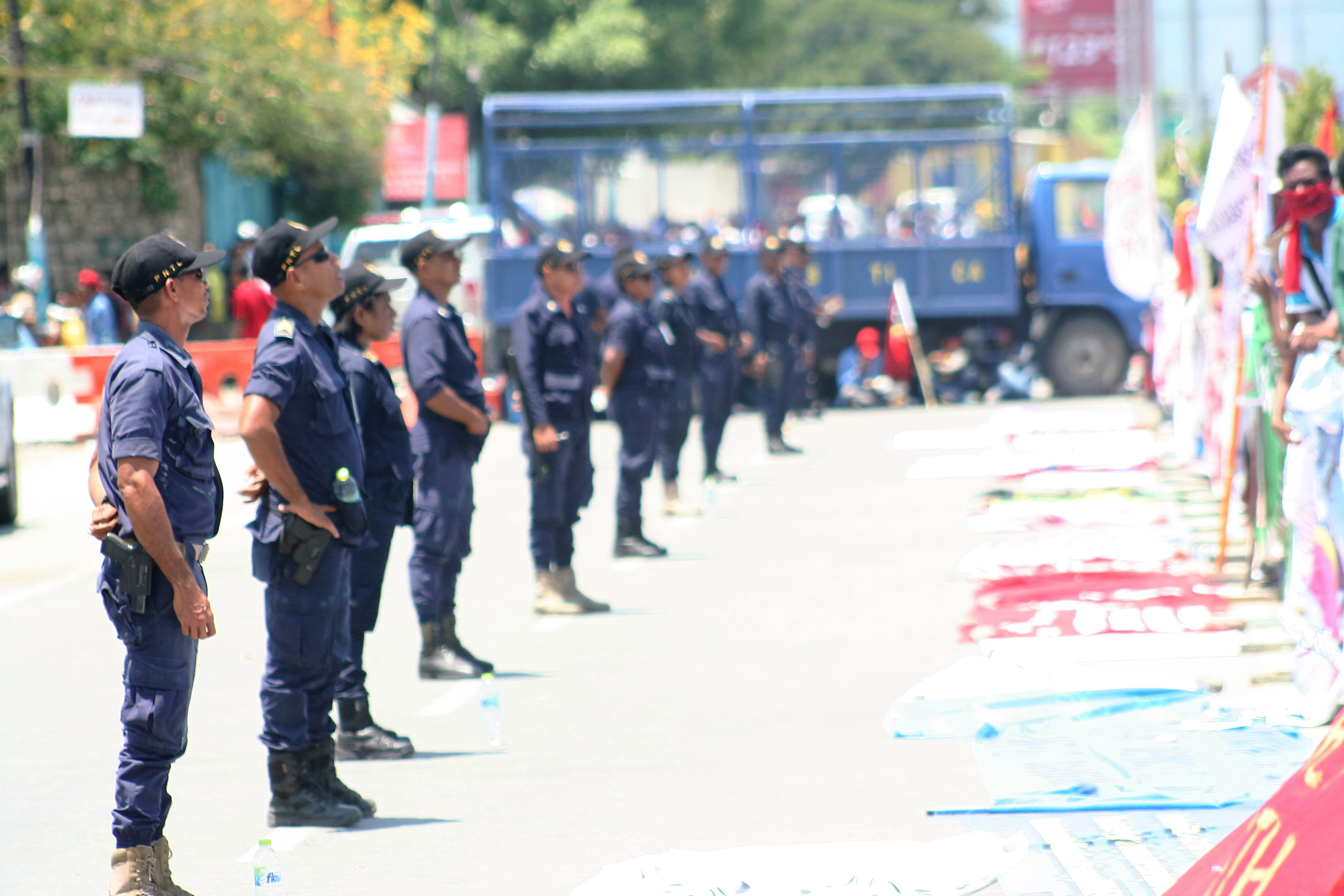
National Police of Timor-Leste at a demonstration

- Section 146: Defense Forces
- Section 147: Police and Security Forces
- Section 148: Supreme Council for Defense and Security

=== Part VI: Guarantee and Revision of the Constitution ===
- Title I: Guarantee of the Constitution
  - Section 149: Anticipatory Constitutional Testing
  - Section 150: Theoretical testing for constitutionality
  - Section 151: Unconstitutional by Omission
  - Section 152: Revision for Constitutionality
  - Section 153: Supreme Court Decisions
- Title II: Examination of the Constitution
  - Section 154: Initiative and Duration of Revision
  - Section 155: Approval and Notice
  - Section 156: Limitation of the Subjects of Revision
  - Section 157: Limitation of the term of the revision

=== Part VII: Final and Transitional Provisions ===
- Section 158: Treaties, Agreements and Alliances
- Section 159: Working Languages
- Section 160: Major Crimes
- Section 161: Illegal Possession of Property
- Section 162: Reconciliation
- Section 163: Transitional Legal Organization
- Section 164: Transitional Jurisdiction of the Supreme Court
- Section 165: Previous Legislation
- Section 166: National Anthem
- Section 167: Conversion of the Constituent Assembly
- Section 168: II. Transitional Government
- Section 169: 2002 Presidential Election
- Section 170: Entry into Force of the Constitution
- I. Fundamental principles
- II. Fundamental rights, duties, liberties and guarantees
- III. Organisation of political power (including the provisions about the three branches of government)
- IV. Economic and financial organisation
- V. National defence and security
- VI. Guarantee and revision of the Constitution
- VII. Final and transitional provisions

== See also ==
- Constitutionalism

== Literature ==
The Constitution in Portuguese and Tetum (PDF)

The Constitution in English (PDF)

Annemarie Devereux: Timor-Leste's Bill of Rights – A Preliminary History, Australian National University, 2015.
