= 2001 East Timorese parliamentary election =

- 30 August 2001
- All 88 seats in the Constituent Assembly
- Turnout: 86.03%
Party	Leader	Vote %	Seats
Fretilin	Mari Alkatiri	57.37	55
Democratic	Fernando de Araújo	8.72	7
PSD	Mário Viegas Carrascalão	8.18	6
ASDT	Francisco Xavier do Amaral	7.84	6
UDT	João Viegas Carrascalão	2.36	2
PNT	Aliança de Araújo	2.21	2
KOTA	Leão Pedro dos Reis Amaral	2.13	2
PPT	Jacob Xavier	2.01	2
PDC	António Ximenes	1.98	2
PST	Pedro dos Mártires da Costa	1.78	1
Liberal	Armando da Silva	1.10	1
UDC	Vicente Guterres	0.66	1
Independents	António da Costa Lelan	1.47	1
This lists parties that won seats. See the complete results below.
Most voted-for party by district and results by constituency
Prime Minister-designate
Mari Alkatiri; Fretilin

Constituent Assembly elections were held in East Timor on 30 August 2001, the second anniversary of the independence referendum. One member was elected from each of the country's thirteen districts, whilst a further 75 were elected by proportional representation. The result was a victory for Fretilin, which won 55 of the 88 seats. Voter turnout was 93%. Following the election the Constituent Assembly nominated a transitional Council of Ministers with Mari Alkatiri as Chief Minister.

== Background ==
The elections were held to elect 88 members of a constituent assembly (the precursor of the National Parliament), which would be in charge of drafting the first constitution of the Asian country. These were the first free and fair elections to take place on Timorese territory in its entire history after the end of the Portuguese colonial period and the occupation by Indonesia (1975-1999). The elections were managed by the United Nations Transitional Administration in East Timor (UNTAET) to begin the second phase of the transition to full independence, after most of the Timorese infrastructure was destroyed by pro-Indonesian militias following the August 1999 independence referendum.

Of the 88 seats in the Constituent Assembly, 13 would be elected by uninominal majority vote in representation of the thirteen districts that make up the country, while the remaining 75 would be elected by proportional representation by lists. Seventeen parties presented lists for the election.

== Results ==
Party	Votes	%	Seats
Fretilin	208,531	57.37	55
Democratic Party	31,680	8.72	7
Social Democratic Party	29,726	8.18	6
Timorese Social Democratic Association	28,495	7.84	6
Timorese Democratic Union	8,581	2.36	2
Timorese Nationalist Party	8,035	2.21	2
Association of Timorese Heroes	7,735	2.13	2
People's Party of Timor	7,322	2.01	2
Christian Democratic Party	7,181	1.98	2
Socialist Party of Timor	6,483	1.78	1
Liberal Party	4,013	1.10	1
Christian Democratic Union of Timor	2,413	0.66	1
Timorese Popular Democratic Association	2,181	0.60	0
Timorese Labor Party	2,026	0.56	0
National Republic Party of East Timor	1,970	0.54	0
Maubere Democratic Party	1,788	0.49	0
Independents	5,341	1.47	1
Total	363,501	100.00	88
Valid votes	363,501	94.60	
Invalid/blank votes	20,747	5.40	
Total votes	384,248	100.00	
Registered voters/turnout	446,666	86.03	
Source: Ying, Elections Today, IDEA

== Aftermath ==
The Constituent Assembly was installed and invested a local autonomous government on 20 September led by a Council of Ministers, the first elected government in the country's history. Fretilin's Secretary General, Mari Alkatiri, took over as President of the Council of Ministers in coalition with the PD, with a two-thirds majority. On 20 May 2002 the United Nations protectorate came to an end and the territory became independent as the Democratic Republic of East Timor. The Constituent Assembly was reconstituted as the National Parliament, and the government of Alkatiri (who changed his position to Prime Minister) became the first constitutional government.

The Assembly had the mandate of preparing a constitution. It had to be approved by at least 60 of the 88 members within 90 days of the Assembly's first sitting. The new constitution was promulgated in March 2002, and following independence on 20 May, served as its first Parliament. Presidential elections were held in April 2002 in which Xanana Gusmão was victorious.

== See also ==
- List of members of the parliament of East Timor, 2001–07
