= 2007 East Timorese presidential election =

- 9 April 2007 (first round); 9 May 2007 (second round)
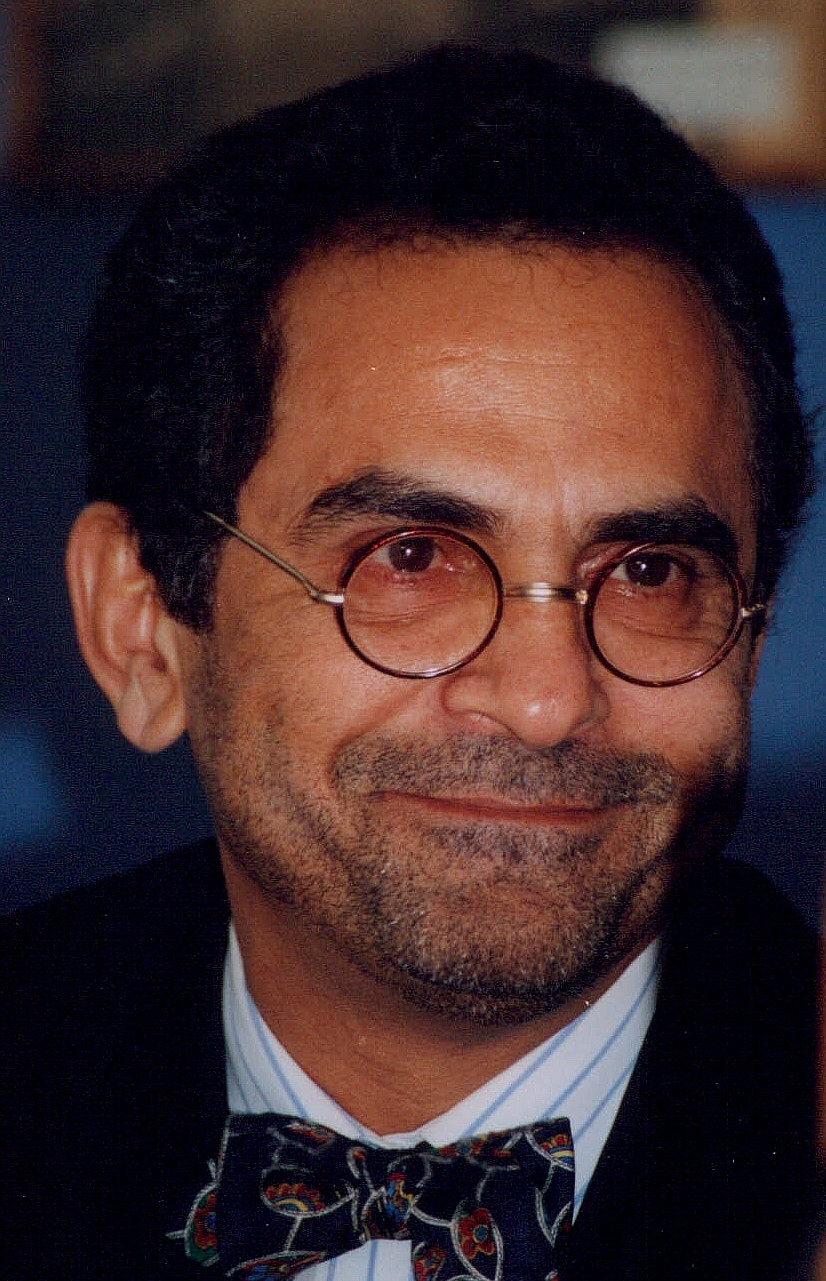

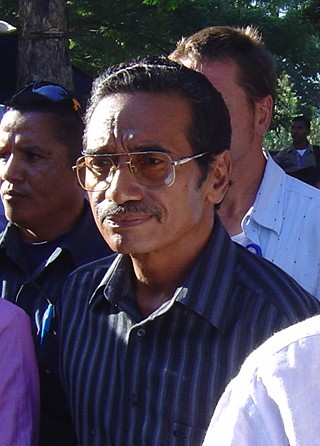
Candidate	José Ramos-Horta	Francisco Guterres
Party	Independent	Fretilin
Popular vote	285,835	127,342
Percentage	69.18%	30.82%
President before election
Xanana Gusmão
CNRT
Elected President
José Ramos-Horta
Independent

Presidential elections were held in East Timor in 2007. The first round on 9 April 2007 saw six of the eight candidates eliminated. The remaining two candidates, incumbent Prime Minister José Ramos-Horta and FRETILIN President Francisco Guterres, faced each other in a runoff election on 9 May 2007. Ramos-Horta won the second round with 69% of the vote.

== Candidates ==
Prime Minister José Ramos-Horta announced in February 2007 that he would be a presidential candidate, receiving the support of incumbent president Xanana Gusmão, who chose not to run for another term. Ramos-Horta's main opponent among the seven other candidates was parliamentary speaker Francisco Guterres, though also running were Francisco Xavier do Amaral (also a candidate in the 2002 election), Avelino Coelho da Silva of the Socialist Party, Fernando de Araújo of the Democratic Party, Lúcia Lobato of the Social Democratic Party (the sole female candidate), João Viegas Carrascalão of the Timorese Democratic Union, and Manuel Tilman of the Association of Timorese Heroes.

== Campaign ==
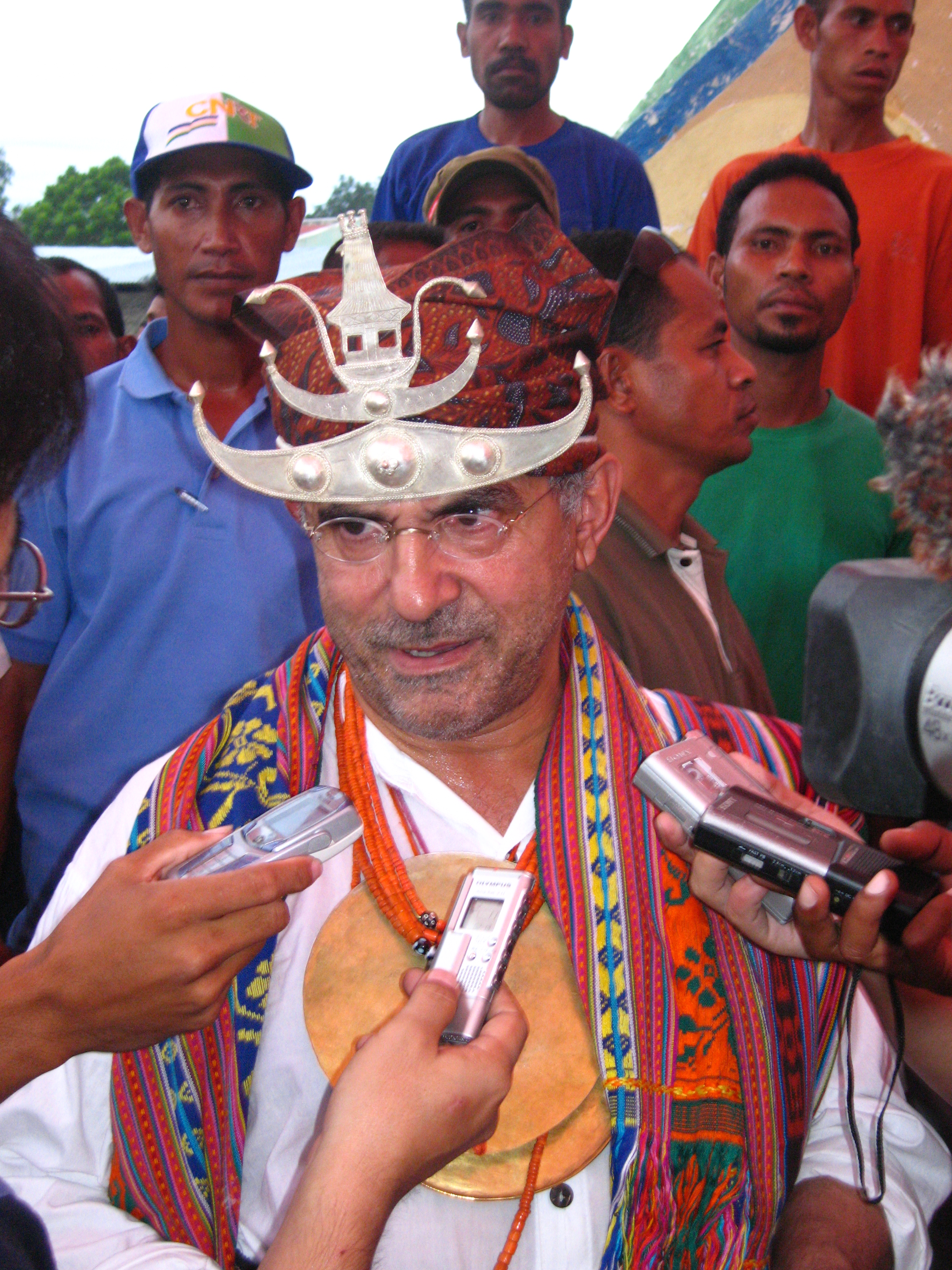
José Ramos-Horta at election campaign with traditional clothing

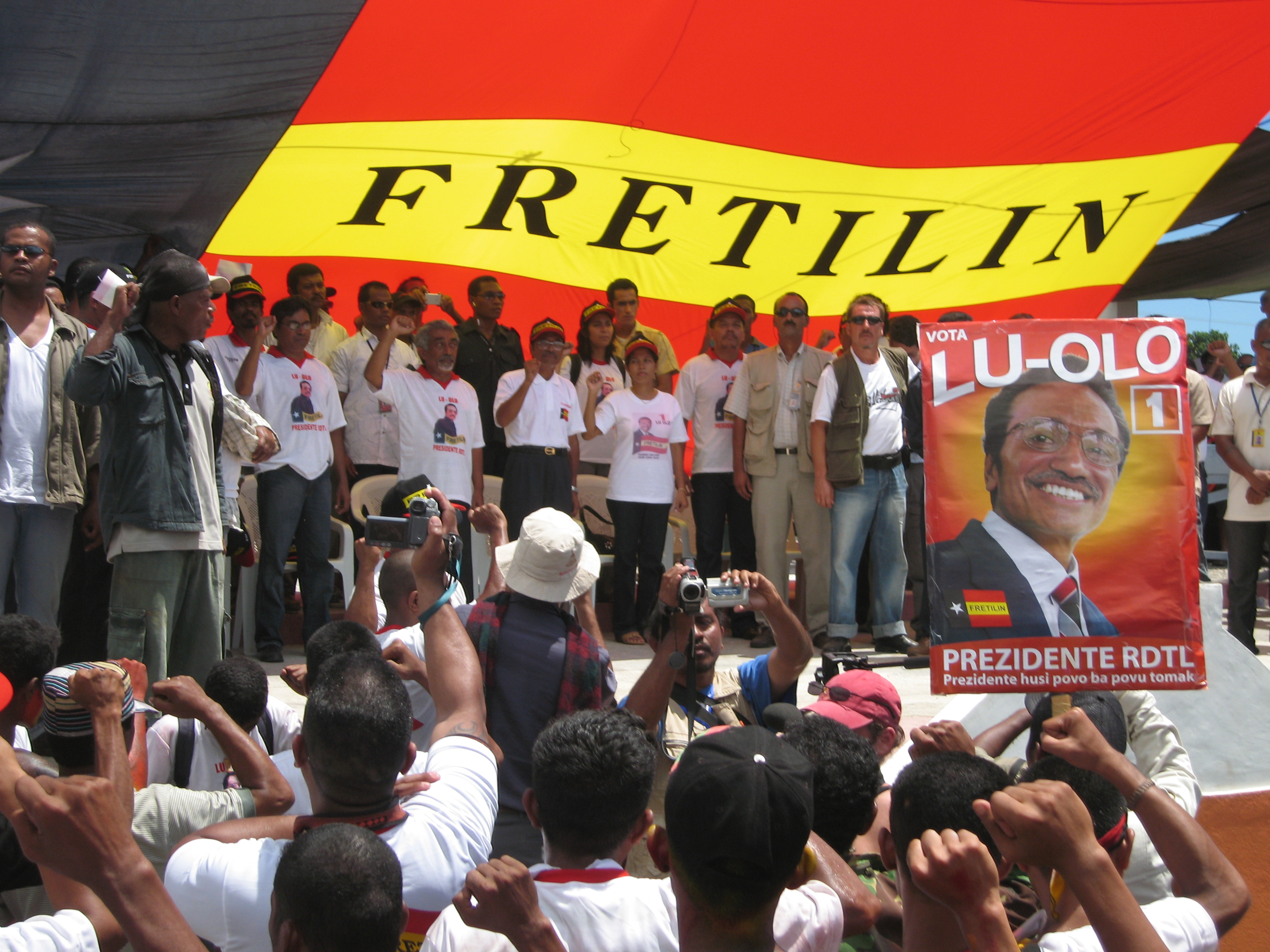
Election campaign with Francisco Guterres and Marí Alkatiri

Campaigning began on 23 March, the day after two people were killed in gun battles with police in the capital Dili, though Ramos-Horta did not mention this in his opening campaign speech, instead focusing on poverty.

Following the announcement of the first round results, on 26 April Araújo announced his party's support for Ramos-Horta in the second round; Ramos-Horta also received the support of four out of the five other candidates: Amaral, Lobato, Coelho da Silva, and Carrascalão. Manuel Tilman endorsed Guterres.

Between the first and second rounds, Guterres alleged that Australian soldiers in East Timor as part of Operation Astute were interfering with the election process and Fretilin campaign rallies. The Fretilin party executive José Teixeira said:

The ISF (International Stabilisation Force) should not be frightening and intimidating an entirely peaceful election gathering... We are not convinced that there is no connection between the troops' behaviour and the Australian Government's apparent support for José Ramos-Horta.

Both Ramos-Horta and the United Nations rejected the Fretilin's claims. On 8 May, the day before the second round, Ramos-Horta rebutted, saying:

Why are they so afraid, so upset that the international security forces go to the east? Because they wanted to operate, put pressure, threaten people with absolute impunity, without a neutral force standing by. That's why they're so upset.

Prior to polling day, both candidates agreed they would accept the result no matter the outcome, with outgoing President Xanana Gusmão also urging all sides to vote peacefully and accept the result.

== Conduct ==
The logistics of providing the entire East Timorese population with access to voting stations proved difficult through both elections. Across the country there were 700 polling stations. Some locations were so isolated that helicopters and donkeys were needed to distribute ballot papers to them.

Amid tight security from the Australian forces present, the election was peaceful and orderly, with no violence related to the election reported. However within a day of votes being counted, irregularities began to appear. These include 87 marked voting papers found at a booth before polls opened as well as children under 17 with their own registration cards attempting to vote.

== Results ==
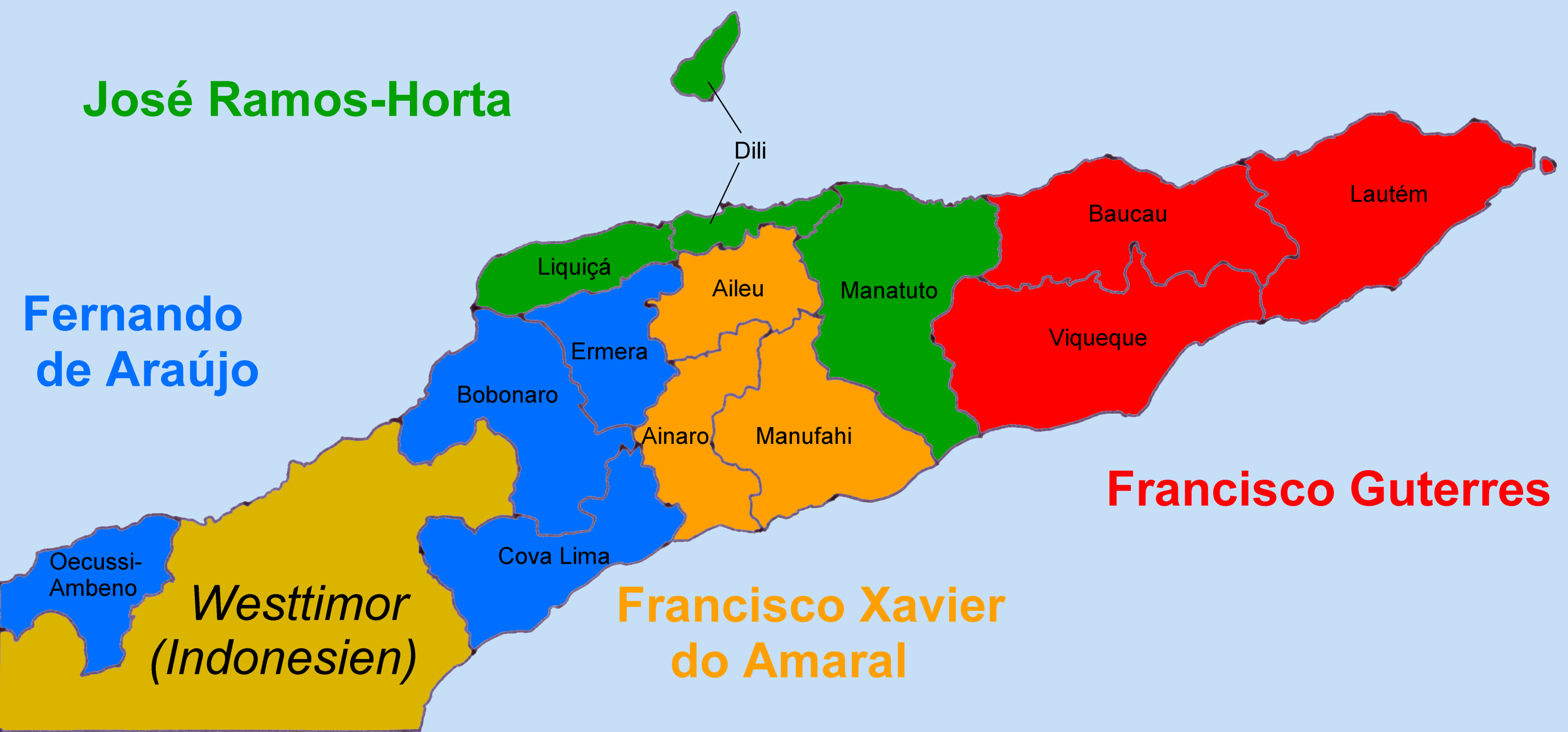
Candidates' majority in districts

Early results of the first round were announced by a spokesman for the national elections commission, Martinho Gusmão, who said that results from the capital Dili showed Ramos-Horta with about 30%, Araújo with about 25%, and Amaral and Guterres with about 20% each. On 11 April, the president of the commission said that Guterres was in first place with 28.8% and would participate in a second round to be held in May, while Ramos-Horta had 22.5% and Araújo had 18.6%. Five of the candidates — Araújo, Amaral, Lobato, Coelho, and Tilman — demanded that vote counting cease, alleging major problems in the election, and said that counting should only be conducted with all the candidates present to observe; they said that they would legally challenge the outcome. Soon afterward, Ramos-Horta joined the calls for a recount, and also called for a UN investigation regarding the absence of votes from 150,000 citizens. Commission spokesman Martinho Gusmão subsequently said on 12 April that there would not be a recount, but on 13 April he said that there were inconsistencies in the vote count and that it was possible that a re-vote might be necessary in some parts of the country. According to final results released by the electoral commission on 18 April, Guterres had 27.89% of the vote (112,666 votes) and Ramos-Horta had 21.81% (88,102 votes), which meant that the two would face each other in a second round. Araújo followed in third place with 19.18% (77,459 votes). Voter turn-out was placed at 81.79%. Following the release of the results, candidates had 24 hours to appeal, and three of the losing candidates, Araújo, Amaral, and Lobato did so, but the results were confirmed by an appeals court.

Following the second round, initial reports predicted a large majority for Ramos-Horta. Ramos-Horta said that he thought that he "could have 70-80%" of the vote, and a spokesman for the election commission said that he was in the lead in most districts. With 90% of votes counted, Ramos-Horta had 73%. However, he declined to declare victory until the results were verified and final. Subsequently, on 11 May, provisional results showed Ramos-Horta with 69% of the vote against 31% for Guterres, and Guterres accepted defeat and congratulated Ramos-Horta. Voter turnout in the second round was placed at 81%. Ramos-Horta took office on 20 May.

Candidate	Party	First round		Second round	
Candidate	Party	Votes	%	Votes	%
Francisco Guterres	Fretilin	112,666	27.89	127,342	30.82
José Ramos-Horta	Independent	88,102	21.81	285,835	69.18
Fernando de Araújo	Democratic Party	77,459	19.18		
Francisco Xavier do Amaral	Timorese Social Democratic Association	58,125	14.39		
Lúcia Lobato	Social Democratic Party	35,789	8.86		
Manuel Tilman	Association of Timorese Heroes	16,534	4.09		
Avelino Coelho da Silva	Socialist Party of Timor	8,338	2.06		
João Viegas Carrascalão	Timorese Democratic Union	6,928	1.72		
Total		403,941	100.00	413,177	100.00
Valid votes		403,941	94.56	413,177	97.34
Invalid/blank votes		23,257	5.44	11,298	2.66
Total votes		427,198	100.00	424,475	100.00
Registered voters/turnout		522,933	81.69	524,073	81.00
Source: ANFREL, IFES

=== First round results by district ===
District	Guterres	Ramos-Horta	de Araújo	do Amaral	Lobato	Tilman	Coelho da Silva	Carrascalão
Aileu	873	1,592	1,492	11,767	817	1,089	288	217
Ainaro	2,453	901	4,623	6,103	1,603	5,555	377	714
Baucau	30,956	13,265	1,105	865	1,226	604	823	300
Bobonaro	4,803	5,562	13,930	2,325	6,678	1,250	635	815
Cova Lima	6,240	1,867	7,681	3,192	3,242	676	218	384
Dili	11,801	29,619	9,904	12,672	4,662	1,734	1,322	771
Ermera	7,187	3,843	18,516	5,946	1,769	1,712	657	1,057
Lautém	12,392	6,006	3,248	743	2,884	345	519	323
Liquiçá	1,979	7,446	3,168	4,089	3,855	1,001	571	791
Manatuto	2,673	6,015	2,133	2,686	485	539	702	681
Manufahi	4,953	1,745	3,116	6,554	1,497	870	281	261
Oecussi-Ambeno	5,661	4,791	7,643	630	5,651	491	254	410
Viqueque	20,695	5,450	900	553	1,420	668	1,691	204
Total	112,666	88,102	77,459	58,125	35,789	16,534	8,338	6,928

=== Second round results by district ===
District	Ramos-Horta	Guterres
Aileu	16,591	1,075
Ainaro	16,395	5,121
Baucau	16,987	33,745
Bobonaro	30,351	5,504
Cova Lima	17,246	5,343
Dili	63,010	15,787
Ermera	33,923	7,198
Lautém	12,919	13,547
Liquiçá	20,705	2,881
Manatuto	13,571	3,240
Manufahi	14,362	4,857
Oecussi-Ambeno	19,332	6,879
Viqueque	10,443	22,165
Total	285,835	127,342
