= Maria Alves =

Maria Alves may refer to:

- Maria José Alves (born 1977), Brazilian paralympian
- Maria Alves (footballer) (born 1993), Brazilian football (soccer) player
- Maria Alves (actress) (1947–2008), Brazilian actress
- Maria Alves (Portuguese actress) (1897–1926), Portuguese actress who was murdered
- Maria Domingas Alves (born 1959), women's rights activist and politician from East Timor
- Maria Fernanda Alves (born 1983), Brazilian tennis player
- Maria Clara Correia Alves (1869–1948), Portuguese feminist
- Maria Alves (Lourdes Maria Assunção Alves Araújo) (1956–2021), women's rights activist and politician from East Timor
