= Lúcia Lobato =

East Timorese politician

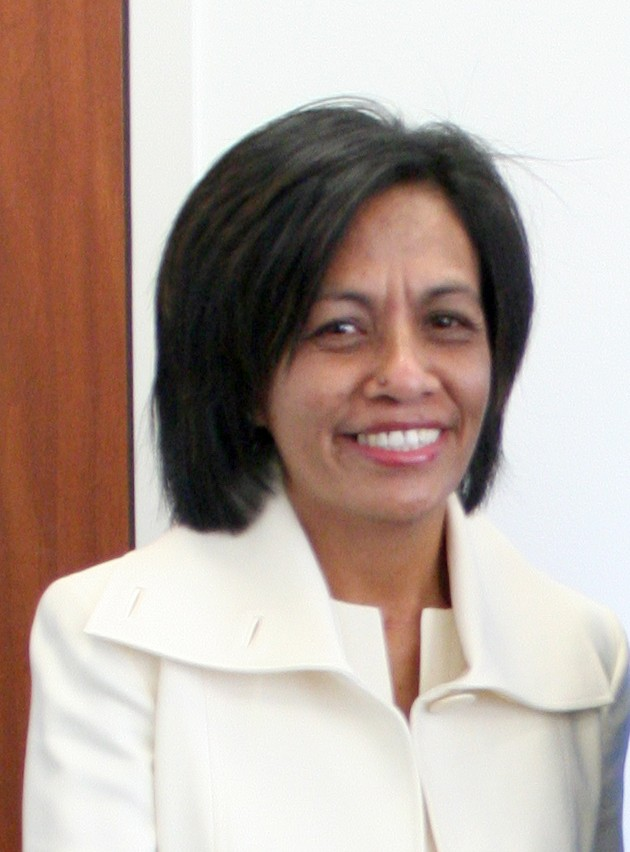
Lúcia Lobato in 2010

Lúcia Maria Brandão Freitas Lobato (born 7 November 1965) is an East Timorese politician and former Minister of Justice. She is a member of the National Parliament, representing the Social Democratic Party.

Lobato was born in Liquiçá, and is a lawyer.

She was elected to the Constituent Assembly (which was subsequently transformed into the National Parliament upon independence in 2002) in the August 2001 parliamentary election, taking her seat on September 15, 2001.

Lobato was a candidate in the April 2007 presidential election, and the only female candidate. She received fifth place and 8.86% of the vote.

In the June 2007 parliamentary election, Lobato was re-elected to Parliament as the third name on the joint candidate list of the PSD and the Timorese Social Democratic Association (ASDT). In the IV Constitutional Government of East Timor of Prime Minister Xanana Gusmão, sworn in on August 8, 2007, she was appointed Minister of Justice. In 2012, Lobato was convicted of corruption and abuse of power. She was found guilty of misappropriation of funds intended for prison construction projects as well as the manipulation of legal tender. The case was elevated to the Court of Appeals but the appeal against her conviction was dismissed. She was sentenced to 5 years imprisonment, which she started serving in January 2013. She is incarcerated in Gleno Prison.
