= ASDT =

ASDT may refer to:

- Associação Social-Democrata Timorense, a Timorese political party
- Average summer daily traffic, a traffic measure
