= Milena Pires =

East Timorese politician

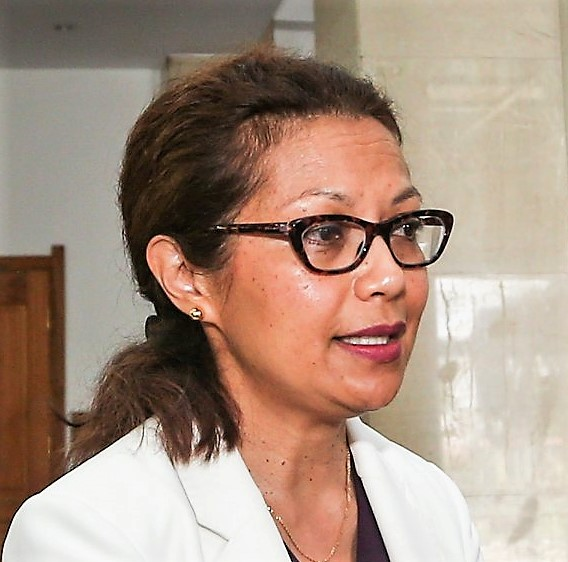
Pires in 2019

Milena Pires is an East Timorese politician and women's rights activist who served as director of the United Nations Development Fund for Women (UNIFEM) in East Timor. From 2016 to 2020, she was the Permanent Representative of East Timor to the United Nations.

== Early life and education ==
Pires was born on 19 June 1966 in Dili, Portuguese Timor. Her family went into exile in Australia when Pires was nine years old, during the Indonesian occupation of East Timor. She studied sociology and English literature, receiving a Bachelor of Arts from the University of New England.

== Career ==
Pires has been active in the East Timorese independence movement since 1989. She was Deputy Speaker of the National Council during the United Nations Transitional Administration in East Timor. She was a member of the Social Democratic Party. From 2001 to 2002 she was a member of the Constituent Assembly and helped to draft the Constitution of East Timor. She then became a member of the first National Parliament. In 2002, Pires was campaign director for President of East Timor, Xanana Gusmão. On 27 August 2007, she was elected a member of the National Council by the National Parliament.

Pires is a member of a number of national and international organisations advocating for women's rights and has worked with the UN to produce numerous reports on women's rights. She received funding from the Catholic Institute for International Relations to research domestic violence in East Timor. From 2002 to 2007 she was director of the UNIFEM offices in East Timor. In 2010, she was elected to the UN Committee on the Elimination of Discrimination against women, serving until 2014. She was a founding member of the Centre for Women and Gender. She has written articles on domestic violence and women's rights.

On 12 April 2016, Pires was appointed by President Taur Matan Ruak as East Timor's Permanent Representative to the United Nations. In 2023, she was nominated as CEO of the East Timor Trading Group.

== Personal life ==
Pires is married to former Foreign Minister and CPLP Executive Secretary Zacarias da Costa and they have one son. Her brother was killed by militia in the Suai Church massacre in 1999.

== Publications ==
- Milena Pires, "Working Towards Women’s Rights in Timor-Leste: The Launch of “Women, War and Peace” and the Visit to the Village of Mauxiga", in Viva Timor-Leste! Volume II, Public Information Office of UNMISET, Dili, 2005, pp. 76–77.
- Pires, Milena (19–22 January 2004). "Enhancing Women's Participation in Electoral Processes in Post Conflict Countries: Experiences from East Timor" (PDF). Glen Cove: United Nations Office of the Special Advisor on Gender Issues and Advancement of Women.
- Milena Pires, "East Timor and the Debate on Quotas" Presentation to Regional Workshop on the Implementation of Quotas, International IDEA, Jakarta, September 2002.
- Milena Pires, "An Overview of Women's Human Rights in East Timor pertaining to CEDAW", UNIFEM, East Timor, 2004
- Pires, Milena; Scott, Catherine (1998). "East Timorese Women: The feminine Face of Resistance". East Timor Occupation and Resistance: 141–151.
