= Christian Democratic Union of Timor =

Political party in East Timor

The Christian Democratic Union of Timor (União Democrata-Crista de Timor) UDC was a centre-right, Christian democratic political party in East Timor.

== History ==
On 14 March 1998, it split from the União Democrática Timorense (UDT) in Portugal.

From August 2000, the party performed with the Partido Democrata Cristão (PDC) under the joint leadership of Vicente da Silva Guterres and Arlindo Marçal, the former moderator of the East Timor Protestant Christian Church. The UDC was represented in the National Council (NC), the PDC was not. Guterres represented the UDC in the Conselho Nacional de Resistência Timorense (CNRT), the umbrella organization of the Timorese resistance, to which Guterres belonged since its inception in 1998. In the CNRT he held the post of secretary. On 5 August 2000, some members split off again as the PDC, while the UDC/PDC alliance continued to exist.

At the first legislative elections, 30 August 2001, the party won 0.7% of the popular vote and 1 out of 88 seats. After the Constituent Assembly elections in 2001, Guterres entered East Timor's National Parliament as leader and sole representative of the UDC/PDC. Guterres has belonged to the Congresso Nacional da Reconstrução Timorense (CNRT) since 2007, while his party wanted to merge with the PDC under its banner.

However, for the 2017 East Timorese parliamentary election, the UDC submitted its own electoral list to the East Timor Supreme Court of Justice.

== Ideology ==
The ideology of the UDC is based on Christian humanism and the social doctrine of the Catholic Church. The majority of the 1,500 members at times are Catholics. As a political system, they aimed for a multi-party system with a semi-presidential form of government based on the French model in the elections to the Constituent Assembly for independent East Timor, albeit with a strong limitation of the president's powers. She also advocated the market economy. The UDC had observer status with the International Christian Democratic Union.
