= Lamtiur Andaliah Panggabean =

Indonesian diplomat (1930–1993)

Her Excellency Lamtiur Andaliah Panggabean
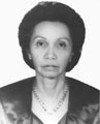

Indonesia Ambassador to Romania
- In office 28 May 1990 – 1993
- President: Suharto
- Preceded by: Homan Benny Mochtan
- Succeeded by: Mário Viegas Carrascalão

Assistant for Institutional Affairs to the State Minister of State Apparatus Utilization
- In office 1983 – 7 July 1990
- Preceded by: Kamarsyah
- Succeeded by: Waluyo Ratam

Personal details
- Born: 26 October 1930 Tanjungkarang, Lampung, Dutch East Indies
- Died: December 8, 1995 (aged 65) Rotterdam, Netherlands
- Resting place: Petamburan Public Cemetery, Jakarta
- Children: 2
- Parents: Johannes Panggabean (father); Milly Emma Siregar (mother)
- Education: Foreign Service Academy; University of Indonesia (S.H.); University of Pittsburgh Graduate School of Public and International Affairs (MPIA)

Lamtiur Andaliah Panggabean (26 October 1930 – 8 December 1995) was an Indonesian diplomat who served as her country's ambassador to Romania from 1990 until 1993.

== Early life and education ==
Lamtiur was born in Tanjungkarang, Lampung, on 26 October 1930 as the sixth of ten child of Johannes Panggabean and Milly Emma Siregar. Her father, Johannes Panggabean, left his birthplace in North Sumatra at a young age and work at a Dutch plantation in Lampung.

Johannes lost his job in Lampung following the Japanese occupation of the Dutch East Indies, and the family decided to leave Lampung for Jakarta. Lamtiur, who was in the fourth grade, had to leave her elementary school in Lampung and continue her education in Jakarta. Lamtiur finished her high school education at the Setiabudi High School in 1950. She initially wanted to become a physician and study medicine but cancelled after her father fell ill.

She decided to apply to enter the Foreign Service Academy, as the tuition was fully funded by the Ministry of Foreign Affairs. Although she was late to apply, one of the other applicants resigned, allowing her to enter the academy. She was the only woman in her cohort. Her classmates in the academy included Ali Alatas, who would later become foreign minister.

Lamtiur decided to study law at the University of Indonesia in 1951, as she felt that studying at the academy was not time consuming. In 1954, she graduated from both the academy and the University of Indonesia with a baccalaureate degree. During her time as a student, she joined the Indonesian University Women's Association.

She received a full bachelor's degree in law from the University of Indonesia in 1962, and a Master of Public and International Affairs degree from the University of Pittsburgh Graduate School of Public and International Affairs in 1974. She also attended a staff and leadership course held by the foreign department for a few months in 1972.

== Career ==
=== Early diplomatic career ===
Lamtiur began her career at the foreign ministry in 1954 as a junior diplomat seconded to the Department for Youth Diplomatic Affairs. A year later, she was attached to the office of the Secretary General of the Bandung Conference. She was sent to her first overseas assignment in 1956 as the third secretary in Indonesia's embassy in Switzerland. She was attached to the Office of the Secretary-General of the Colombo Plan Conference in Yogyakarta in 1959.

In 1962, Lamtiur was assigned to the Indonesian representative office in Western New Guinea. After the territory's administration was handed over to the United Nations as the United Nations Temporary Executive Authority, Lamtiur worked as an Indonesian employee in the authority. Her official position in the Foreign Department from 1960 to 1967 was as an employee at the Steering Committee of the International Organization for Legal Affairs, then as Head of the Immunities, Tax Shields and Facilities Subsection at the Protocol Office of the Ministry of Foreign Affairs.

She was sent to another overseas assignment in 1967 as the second secretary, and later first secretary, at the Indonesian Embassy in Manila. She completed her diplomatic assignment in the Philippines in 1970 and was appointed as the chief of personnel bureau in the foreign ministry in 1971. She served in this position for only a year, as from 1972 to 1974 she had to pursue her master's studies in the United States. Upon returning to Indonesia in 1974, she served as the Head of the Administration Development Department within the Organizational Bureau of the Foreign Ministry.

Lamtiur was also active in women's organization. She joined the Indonesian Christian Women's Association in 1970 and became the organization's secretary general for two terms, as well as becoming the organization's representative in the Indonesian Women's Congress. She also became a two-term member of the National Commission on the Status of Women, and from 1988 until 1993 she became an expert staff to the commission.

=== Minister-assistant ===
While working in the foreign ministry, she met her old friend, who informed her about a vacancy for a high-ranking position in the office of the State Minister for State Apparatus Order. She successfully applied for the position, and from 1975 to 1983 she served as the deputy to the assistant for the State Minister of State Apparatus Order, which at that time was held by Johannes Baptista Sumarlin. After Sumarlin was replaced from the position by Saleh Afiff in 1983, the office was renamed to State Minister of State Apparatus Utilization. She was promoted to become the first assistant to the State Minister of State Apparatus Utilization with responsibility for institutional affairs. Unlike inaugurations of high-ranking officials at that time, her inauguration as first assistant was not broadcast by the national television. During this period, she was also member of the National Committee for Education. At the end of his tenure as first assistant in 1990, Lamtiur became part of team tasked with studying the formation of autonomous agencies for various functions within the framework of cooperation between the British government and the Indonesian government.

Alongside her assignment in the State Minister of State Apparatus Order, Lamtiur continued to be sent abroad. She participated in the 1978 International Law Seminar held by the International Court of Justice and led a group of Indonesian delegates for benchmarking to Philippines, Malaysia and Singapore in 1982. In 1983 and 1984, she was a member of the Indonesian delegation to the first and second preparatory sessions of the International Conference on Women, which was held in Nairobi in 1985. In the 1980s she participated in the IASIA Conferences in Berlin, New York, Bloomington, Tunis and Minneapolis, and in two Eastern Regional Organizations of Public Administration (EROPA), held in Jakarta and Manila. Around the same time, in 1980 she visited the United States as part of a delegation that conducted a fact-finding visit to American universities.

=== Ambassador ===
On 28 May 1990, Lamtiur was installed by President Suharto as ambassador to Romania, making her the fifth woman in Indonesia to serve as an ambassador. Her old position as minister assistant was handed over to Waluyo Ratam on 7 July 1990. She was later accredited as Indonesia's ambassador to Moldova in 1993.

As ambassador, Lamtiur oversaw the establishment of the Indonesian-Romania Friendship Association in 1991. The embassy also cooperated and assisted a team led by Dumitru Murariu from the Grigore Antipa National Museum of Natural History on a four-month expedition to Java, Bali, Sulawesi, and Sumatra. One of the expedition team members, Modest Guțu, discovered a new crustacean species on the shores of Bali. The new species, in the genus Pagurapseudes, was given the species epithet of pangtiruthuli, a portmanteau of Lamtiur's name and those of her two children, Ruth Hadassah and Irianto Rouli Sukaton.

Lamtiur attended the Golgotha Baptist Christian Church in Bucharest and was well-acquainted with the church's choir. She invited the choir to the Indonesian embassy twice, on 17 and 25 December 1992.

Lamtiur retired in 1993, and died in Rotterdam on 8 December 1995 due to cancer.

== Personal life ==
Lamtiur was a Baptist Protestant Christian.
