= Adalgisa Ximenes =

Diplomat and politician in East Timor

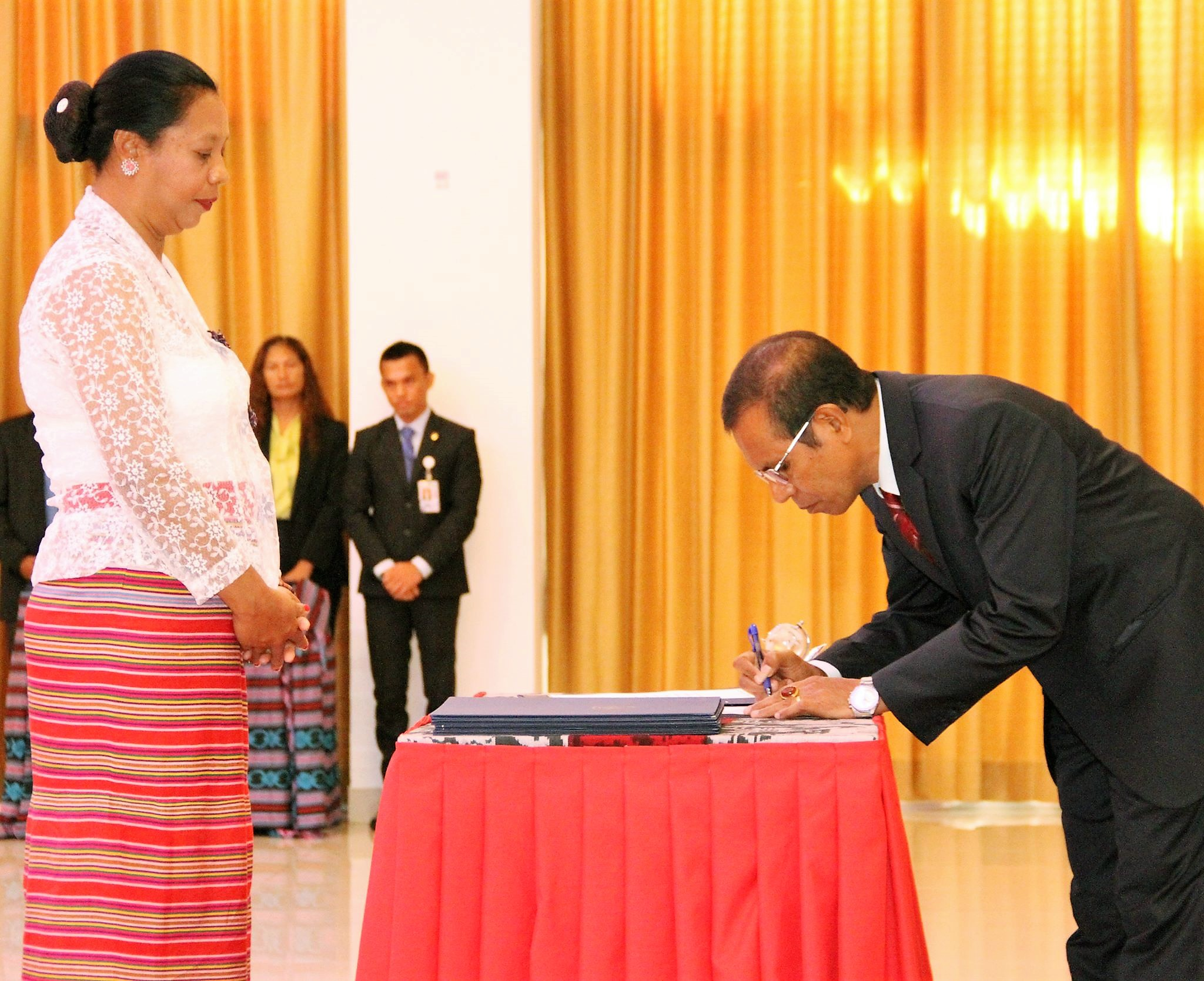
- Ximenes receiving her accreditation from Taur Matan Ruak on 11 February 2016

Ambassador of East Timor to South Korea
- Prime Minister: Taur Matan Ruak

Personal details
- Born: 13 March 1968 (age 58) Dili, Portuguese Timor
- Party: Revolutionary Front for an Independent East Timor (FRETLIN)
- Education: Brawijaya University; Universidade Nacional Timor Lorosa'e

Adalgisa Maria Soares Ximenes (born 13 March 1968) is a diplomat and former politician in East Timor.

== Biography ==
Ximenes was born in Dili, Portuguese Timor, and received her primary and secondary education in Viqueque. She went on to earn a bachelor's degree from the Brawijaya University in Malang, Indonesia and to pursue post-graduate studies in education at the Universidade Nacional Timor Lorosa'e.

Ximenes was elected to the National Parliament of East Timor in 2001 as a member of the Revolutionary Front for an Independent East Timor (FRETLIN) and served until 2007. Before being elected to the assembly, Ximenes served as an administrator and then project officer for CARE International. During her time in the assembly, she served as president of the Permanent Commission for Health and Labor.

From 2009 to 2010, Ximenes served as head of the National Commission for Child Rights in East Timor.

In 2016, Ximenes was named Ambassador of East Timor to South Korea. She presented her credentials to President Park Geun-hye.
