= Timorese Nationalist Party =

Timorese Nationalist Party Partido Nacionalista Timorense
- Abbreviation: PNT
- Founder: Abílio Araújo
- Founded: 15 June 1999
- Dissolved: 14 May 2012
- Ideology: Nationalism; Pre-independence: Autonomism; Pro-Indonesia
- National Parliament: 0 / 65

Party flag

The Timorese Nationalist Party (Indonesian: Partai Nasionalis Timor; Portuguese: Partido Nacionalista Timorense; PNT) was a political party in East Timor. Founder and President was Abílio Araújo, who was FRETILIN representative overseas during the Indonesian occupation until his dismissal in 1993.

Prior to the 1999 East Timorese independence referendum, the PNT advocated an autonomy solution rather than independence from Indonesia. In terms of orientation, it was referred to as progressive national. Indonesian was to remain the official language and the Indonesian rupiah as the currency. Araújo criticized the then President Xanana Gusmão's decision to make Portuguese the official language and in this context repeatedly referred to Gusmão's and José Ramos-Horta's Portuguese roots. An important point in the policy of the PNT was the close friendly relationship with Indonesia. Here it worked with the Indonesian party PDI-P.

== Performance in Elections ==
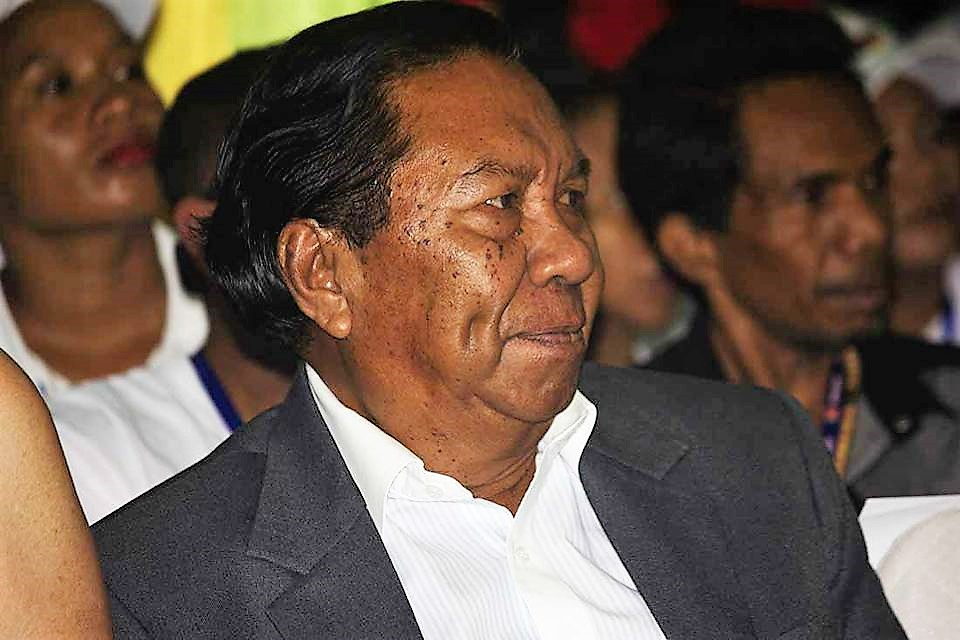
Abílio Araújo (2017)

In the parliamentary election held on 30 August 2001, the party won 2.2% of the popular vote and 2 out of 88 seats. Deputies were Aires Francisco Cabral and the sister of PNT President Aliança Araújo.

In the parliamentary election held on 30 June 2007, the PNT received only 10,057 votes, which corresponds to 2.42% of the valid votes and did not win any seats in parliament, as it did not reach the 3% threshold to win seats. The party found the greatest support in the Baucau district, where she received 1,273 votes (2.46%). The PNT received more than 1000 votes only in the Viqueque district with 1183 votes (3.57%).

In July 2007, the PNT joined five other parties that had also failed at the three percent hurdle in the parliamentary elections to form the Liga Democrática Progressiva LDP. The LDP was intended to serve as a political platform outside of parliament for the parties, which were very different in terms of ideology and programme.

The PNT was not admitted to the 2012 parliamentary elections because it did not submit its electoral list to the electoral authorities by the deadline. Aliança Araújo competed with her Partido Timorense Democrático (PTD), founded in 2008, but failed to clear the three percent hurdle.
