= Maria Paixão da Costa =

East Timorese politician

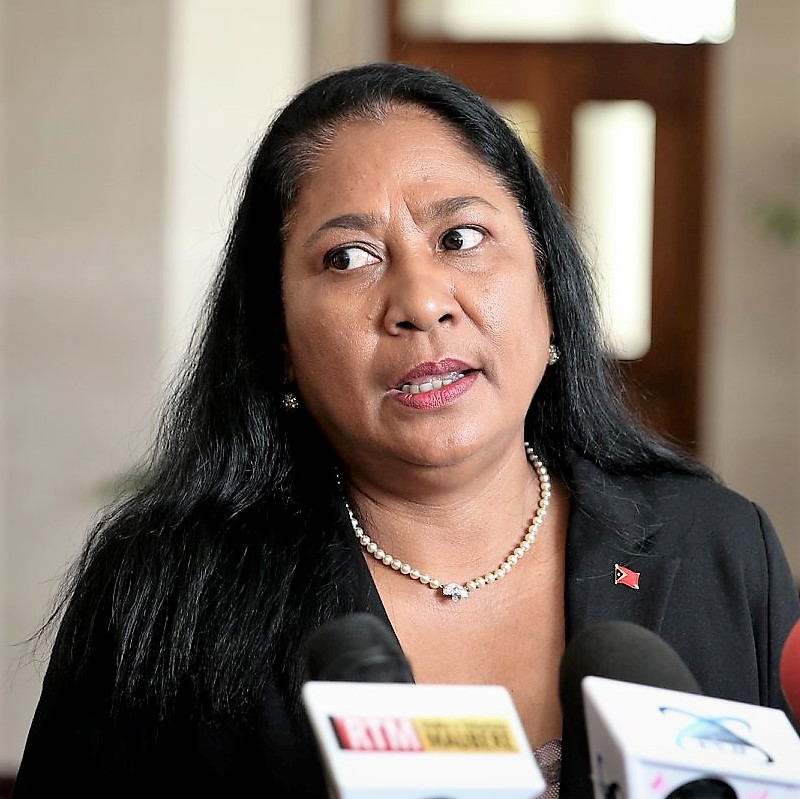
- Maria da Paixão da Costa in 2019

East Timor Ambassador to Portugal
- In office 2014–2020
- Preceded by: Natália Carrascalão
- Succeeded by: Isabel Amaral Guterres

Deputy in the National Parliament
- In office 2002–2012
- Constituency: Aileu Municipality

Personal details
- Born: April 2, 1960 (age 66) Remexio, Aileu Municipality, East Timor
- Party: Social Democratic Party

Maria da Paixão de Jesus da Costa (born April 2, 1960) is a politician and diplomat from East Timor. She is a member of the Partido Social Democrata (PSD) and was vice president of the party.

== Biography ==
Costa was born in Remexio in Aileu Municipality in 1960. She completed a degree in political science at the National University of East Timor.

During the United Nations administration of East Timor (1999–2002), Costa was district administrator for her home district of Aileu. She then served as a deputy in the National Parliament in the first and second legislatures, from 2002 to 2012. She was also president of the Women's Parliamentary Group of East Timor (GMPTL).

From 2014 to 2020, Costa was Ambassador of East Timor to Portugal. She has promoted the learning of the Portuguese language in East Timor, visiting the University of Porto during her term as Ambassador. From 21 March 2015 Costa was also accredited as Ambassador of East Timor to Cape Verde.
