= Lourdes Alves Araújo =

East Timorese feminist, separatist activist and politician

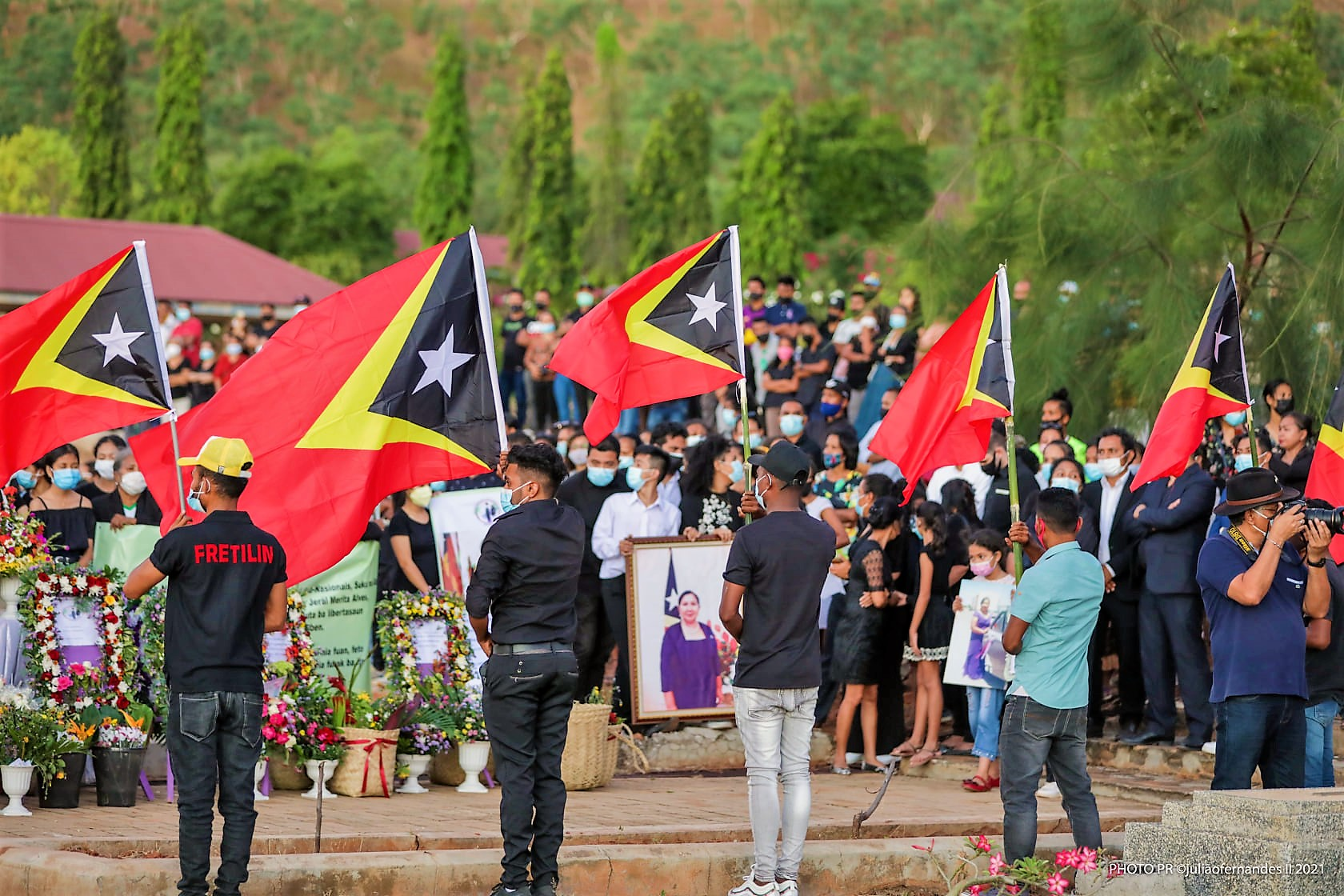
Alves' funeral on 27 May 2021

Lourdes Maria Assunção Alves Araújo or Lourdes Maria Assunção de Jesus Mascarenhas Alves, also known as Merita Alves, (15 August 1956 – 24 May 2021) was an East Timorese activist and politician.

Born in Hatólia, Ermera, she was the eldest daughter in the family, and had ten brothers.

In 1975, during the Indonesian invasion of East Timor, she fled with her parents and brothers into the forests of Lacló and fought against the invasion. In 1976 she became deputy secretary of the People's Organization of Women Timor (OPMT), in the Lacló Zone. She was arrested and imprisoned in 1978. While in prison she met fellow prisoner Octávio Jordão de Araújo, one of the founders of Fretilin. They were married on 29 March 1978, and later had four children. They were both imprisoned again from 1980 to 1984.

In 2007 she was a member of the National Parliament of East Timor for Fretilin, the Frente Revolucionária de Timor-Leste Independente or "Revolutionary Front for an Independent East Timor".

She died from cancer on 24 May 2021 at her home in Dili.
