= Social Democratic Party (Timor-Leste) =

Social Democratic Party Partido Social Democrata
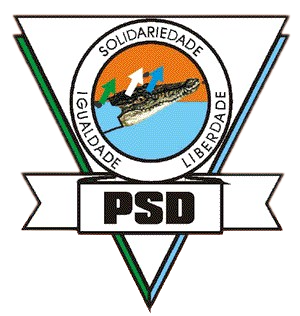
- Leader: Zacarias da Costa
- Founded: 20 September 2000
- Headquarters: Dili
- Ideology: Liberalism; Social conservatism
- Political position: Centre
- Colours: Orange
- National Parliament: 0 / 65

Party flag
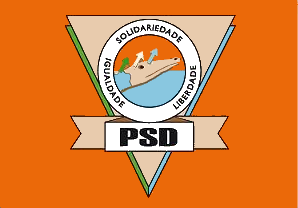

The Social Democratic Party (Partido Social Democrata) is an East Timorese party founded on 20 September 2000. Despite its name, the party, like its Portuguese model, is usually categorised as centre-right in the political spectrum (conservative, Christian democratic). It describes itself as being in the middle between left and right (centrist). The aim of the party's founders was to offer voters a moderate alternative to Fretilin and UDT. In 2002, the party had 8,000 members. Since then, the PSD has lost its importance. The PSD did not contest the 2023 parliamentary elections in Timor-Leste.

The PSD was one of five parties in the Alliance of the Parliamentary Majority (AMP) coalition in Timor-Leste's national parliament, which formed the government between 2007 and 2012.

== General ==
When the party was founded at the headquarters of the National Council of Maubere Resistance (CNRT), Xanana Gusmão was the speaker, which is why the party was said to be close to the first president of Timor-Leste. From its foundation, the party was a member of the CNRT, the umbrella organisation of East Timorese parties and organisations, until its dissolution in 2001. The party's symbol is the crocodile, which plays a role in Timor's creation story. The party colour is orange, following the example of the Portuguese PSD, and the party motto is "Solidariedade, Igualdade, Liberdade" (Solidarity, Equality, Freedom). There is a separate youth and workers' section. There are also working groups on labour, the political system, the economy, foreign policy and other political areas.

== Programme ==
The PSD advocates respect for human rights, pluralism, participation, social justice, the rule of law, setting a minimum wage, the rights of women, children and minorities, and individual equality and rights. The PSD rejects politics according to ideology. It emphasises the role of government in the economy and environmental protection. Its efforts focus on education, culture, housing and health. The death penalty and abortion are rejected. Social benefits are intended primarily for those most affected by the war of independence, namely veterans, widows and orphans. The PSD supported the introduction of Portuguese as an official language and a further development of Tetum.

== History ==
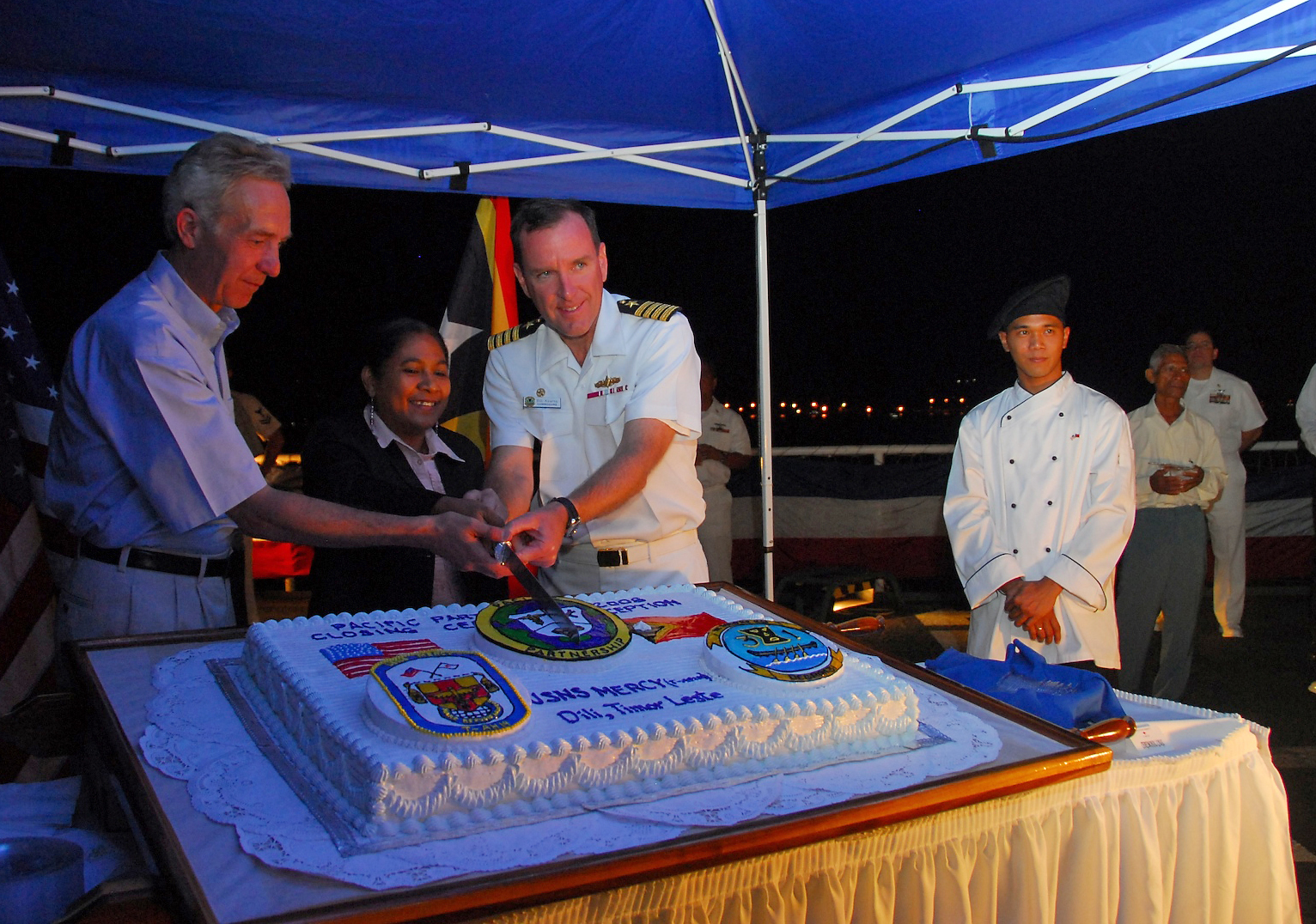
Vice-president of Parliament Maria da Paixão on board the USNS Mercy

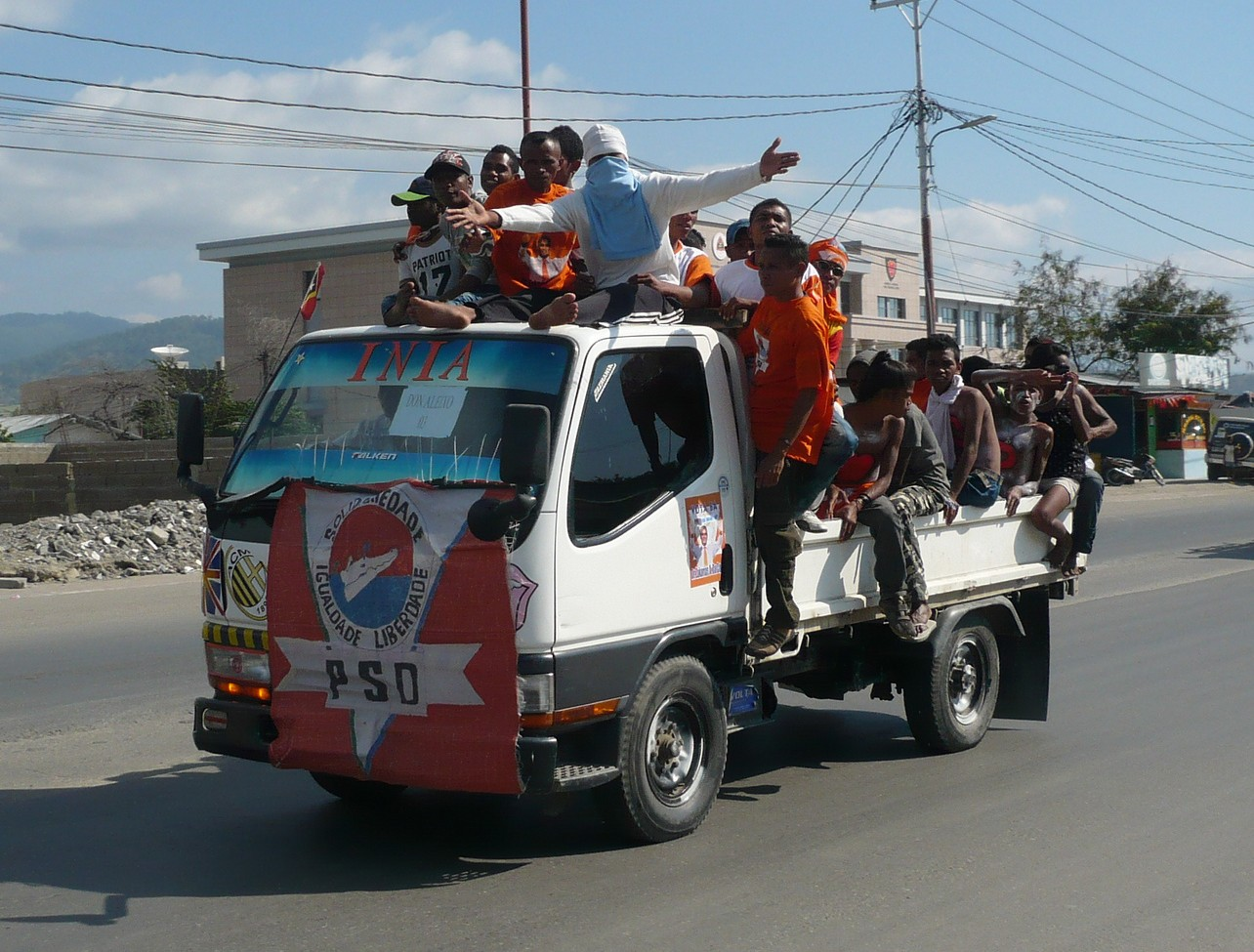
PSD campaign for the 2012 parliamentary election

The Party (PSD) was established by Mario Viegas Carrascalao, Zacarias Albano da Costa, and Leandro Isaac, amongst other prominent figures of the timorese political elite on 20 September 2000. The Social Democratic Party is currently led by Zacarias Albano da Costa, who is also Minister for Foreign Affairs since 8 August 2007.

In the first parliamentary elections on 30 August 2001, the PSD received 8.2% of the vote, giving it six of the 88 seats in the East Timorese parliament. The PSD members of parliament were Fernando Dias Gusmão, Leandro Isaac, Lúcia Lobato, and Vidal de Jesus (Comandante Riak Leman, former member of Falintil). Milena Pires (former campaign manager of Xanana Gusmão, gave up her mandate to become head of UNIFEM Timor-Leste) and Mário Viegas Carrascalão were replaced during the legislature by João Mendes Gonçalves and Maria da Paixão da Costa, the vice-president of Parliament. Isaac, until then deputy leader of the party, was expelled from the PSD in 2003, but kept his seat in parliament.

At the beginning of March, Isaac joined the rebels trapped in Same, led by Alfredo Reinado, to protest against their imminent arrest. He was unhurt when Australian soldiers stormed the town. Four rebels died, some were captured, but Reinado managed to escape. Before these incidents, the PSD had called on Reinado to run as its candidate in the 2007 presidential elections. Later, party leader Mário Viegas Carrascalão announced his candidacy, but then Lúcia Lobato stood as the only female candidate in the elections. She was eliminated after the first round with 8.86% of the vote.

In the parliamentary elections on 30 June 2007, the PSD ran in a joint list with the Timorese Social Democratic Association (ASDT). The list was called Coligação ASDT/PSD (Coalition ASDT/PSD, or C-ASDT/PSD). It received 15.73% of the vote and 11 of the 65 seats in parliament. It thus became the third strongest force after Fretilin and the National Congress for Timorese Reconstruction (CNRT). In the then districts of Manufahi, Aileu and Ainaro, the ASDT/PSD even won the most votes. Fretilin, which became the strongest party with 21 seats, laid claim to leadership in a future government, either as a minority government or in a coalition, but C-ASDT/PSD, CNRT and Democratic Party (PD) joined forces in a coalition called the Alliance of Parliamentary Majority, or AMP. With 37 seats, the AMP had a slim majority in parliament. After unsuccessful negotiations with Fretilin and mediation attempts by President Ramos-Horta, CNRT leader Xanana Gusmão was finally appointed to form a government and presided over an AMP government as prime minister. In the government, the PSD provided three ministers. In which, the President of the Social Democratic Party is currently led by Zacarias Albano da Costa, who is also Minister for Foreign Affairs since 8 August 2007.

At the beginning of May, the ASDT signed a declaration of alliance with the Fretilin. However, it did not leave the governing coalition, but plans to work with the Fretilin in the next elections. Both parties therefore called for new elections in spring 2009. However, the PSD remained in the coalition with the CNRT despite dissatisfaction within its own ranks.

In the 2012 parliamentary elections, the PSD failed to clear the three-percent hurdle with 10,158 votes (2.15%). The PSD received over 3% in the districts of Bobonaro (3.17%), Manufahi (5.70%) and Oecusse (5.87%).

In the 2017 general elections, the PSD received 0.83% of the vote, failing to clear the four-percent threshold. The PSD then joined the Fórum Demokrátiku Nasionál (FDN), but in 2018, before the early new elections on 12 May, it separated from the alliance to become part of the Movimento Social Democrata (MSD). In the 2018 early general elections in Timor-Leste, the MSD failed significantly to clear the four percent hurdle with only 3,188 votes (share: 0.5%).

== Notable members ==
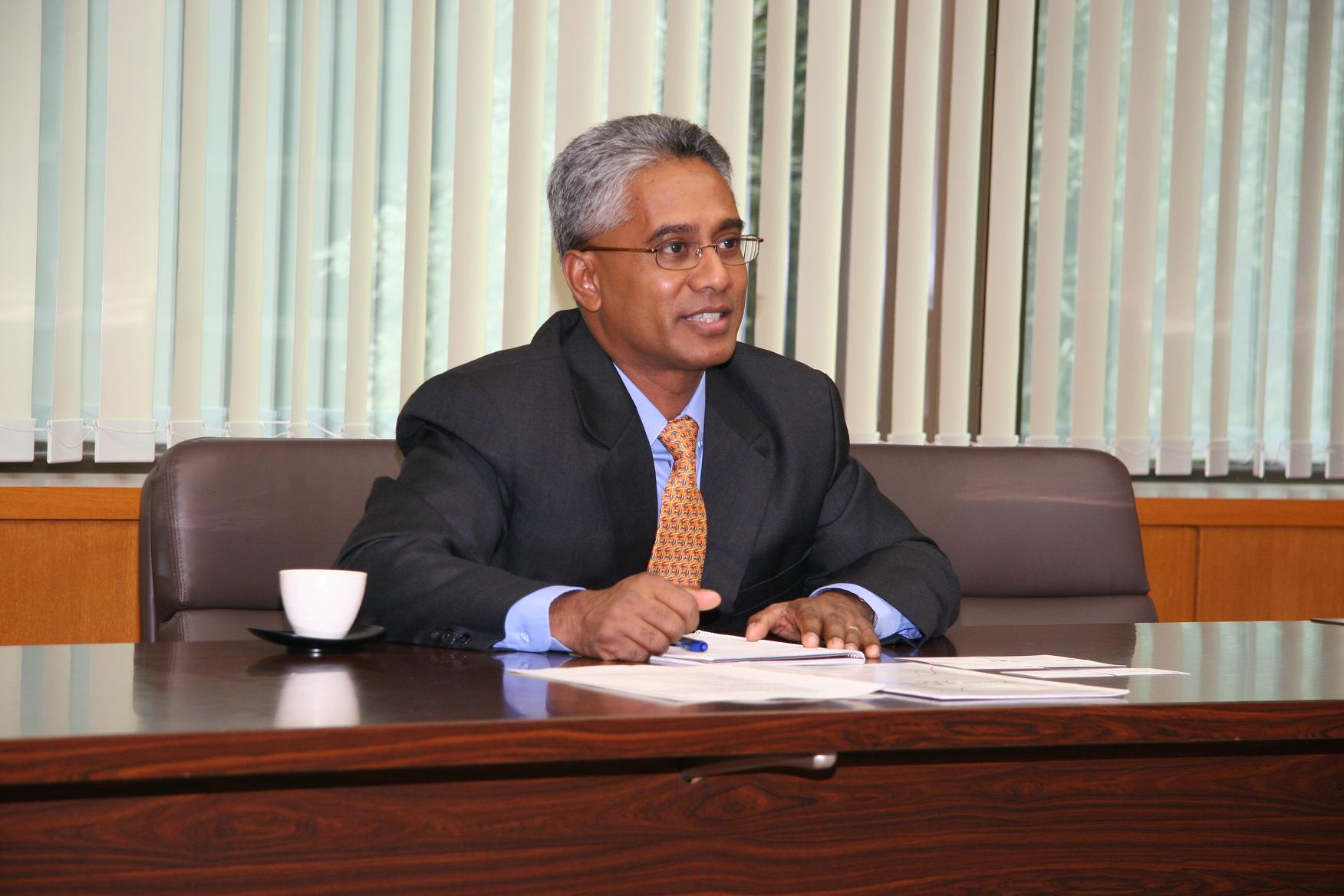
Former party leader, Zacarias da Costa

The co-founder and first president of the PSD was Mário Viegas Carrascalão, who had already been governor of the then Timor Timur province during the Indonesian occupation, exposing human rights violations by the Indonesians. He was highly respected in East Timor and throughout Southeast Asia.

His successor as party president was Zacarias Albano da Costa on 7 December 2008. He prevailed over General Secretary, Fernando Dias Gusmão, in a fightback vote. Costa was Timor-Leste's foreign minister between 2007 and 2012, formerly an adviser to the US Department of Development USAID and a former deputy chair of the UDT (1993–2000). For a time, Costa was secretary-general of the PSD. Fernando Gusmão eventually left the PSD and founded the Party of National Development (PDN). Marito Magno now became General Secretary of the PSD.

Lúcia Lobato was deputy chairperson and sat in the National Parliament for the PSD from 2001 to 2007. She was a presidential candidate in 2007 and Minister of Justice in Timor-Leste's IV government from 2007 to 2012. In 2012, Lobato was sentenced to five years in prison for fund mismanagement and removed from office. Another vice-chairman is Vidal Riak Leman de Jesus.

João Mendes Gonçalves was also vice-chairman and party spokesman. He held the post of Minister of Economy and Development in the IV government. He unsuccessfully led the party into the 2017 and 2018 general elections as the new leader.

Papito Monteiro was Secretary of State for Rural Development from August 2007 to September 2008, but resigned from his post for health reasons. In 2017, he was vice-president of the PSD.

Other former Fretilin and UDT leadership members are also among the founders. Even the later president of Timor-Leste, the non-party José Ramos-Horta, is said to have played a role in the foundation, but Ramos-Horta denies this. Other prominent members are Germano Jesus da Silva (formerly Fretilin), Carlos Alberto and Ágio Pereira (formerly Fretilin, now CNRT).
