= Francisco Xavier do Amaral =

East Timorese politician (1937–2012)

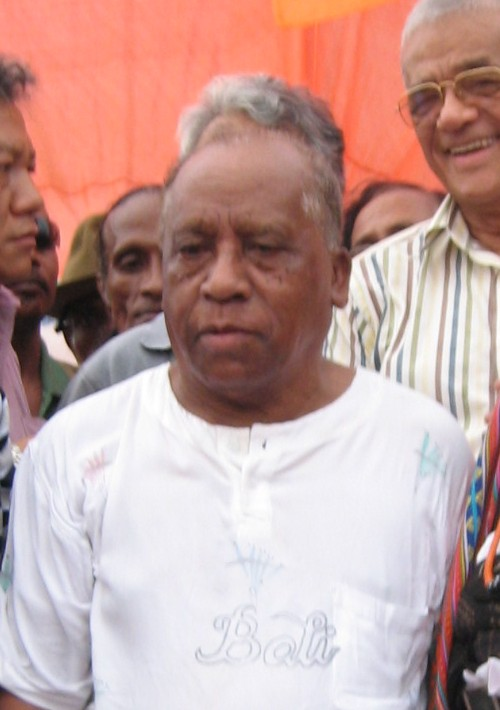
- Amaral in 2007

1st President of East Timor
- In office 28 November 1975 – 7 December 1975
- Prime Minister: Nicolau dos Reis Lobato
- Preceded by: Office established (Note: Although the first President of East Timor, its head of state and/or government prior to Amaral's ascension was Mário Lemos Pires as Colonial Governor of Portuguese Timor.)
- Succeeded by: Nicolau dos Reis Lobato

Personal details
- Born: 3 December 1937 Turiscai, Portuguese Timor
- Died: 6 March 2012 (aged 74) Dili, East Timor
- Party: ASDT
- Other political affiliations: Fretilin
- Spouse: Lucia Osorio Soares
- Occupation: Politician

Francisco Xavier do Amaral (3 December 1937 – 6 March 2012) was an East Timorese politician. A founder of the Frente Revolucionária de Timor Leste Independente (Fretilin), Amaral was sworn in as the first President of East Timor when the country, then a Portuguese colony, made a unilateral declaration of independence on 28 November 1975. He was a member of the National Parliament for the Timorese Social Democratic Association from 2001 until his death in 2012. Amaral was also known as "Abo (Grandfather) Xavier", a term of endearment, by East Timorese.

== Biography ==
=== Early life ===
A member of the Mambai ethnic group, Amaral was a descendant of kings who ruled what is now the south-central Manufahi District of East Timor. He married Lucia Osorio Soares in 1974, but they separated soon after. The pair had no children, and Amaral never remarried.

=== President of East Timor ===
Amaral founded the Timorese Social Democratic Association in the early 1970s. The party, which is considered a forerunner of the Fretilin, advocated for independence from Portugal.

Amaral was sworn in as the country's first President on 28 November 1975, when the Democratic Republic of East Timor declared independence from Portugal. His tenure in the presidency last only 10 days before he was forced to flee into the mountainous interior with the Fretilin due to the Indonesian invasion of the country on 7 December 1975. Though most world governments refused to recognise East Timor's independence or Amaral's authority during his ten-day rule in 1975, the East Timorese people regarded Amaral as the country's first president, according to Damien Kingsbury, a political science professor at Deakin University and a leading expert on East Timor.

=== Imprisonment and exile ===
Amaral was ousted from Fretilin and imprisoned by the party's Marxist faction in 1977 amid disagreements over strategy for opposing the Indonesian occupation. The Fretilin faction held and moved him frequently as they battled the Indonesian military forces. He was abandoned in August 1978 when his Fretilin captors were ambushed, and was promptly arrested by the Indonesian Army.

From the late 1980s until 1999, Amaral was co-chairman of the Indonesian-Portugal Friendship Association (PPIP), an NGO established in Jakarta to establish dialogue with Portuguese community leaders in attempts to find a non-political people-initiated solution for East Timor.

The Indonesian government used Amaral as a propaganda tool to divide the East Timorese independence movement following his capture. He was exiled to Bali, where he was forced to work as a house servant for General Dading Kalbuadi, a leader of the Indonesian invasion of East Timor. He was moved to Jakarta in 1983, where he befriended another Timorese exiled prisoner, Xanana Gusmão. Amaral and Gusmão became close friends during their imprisonment in Jakarta.

Amaral attempted to negotiate several peace agreements with the Indonesian government while in exile in Jakarta. His negotiations with Indonesia proved highly controversial with other East Timorese separatists. He was released from General Kalbuadi's house in Jakarta, but lived in poverty for the remainder of his exile. Amaral remained in Jakarta from 1983 until Indonesia's withdrawal from East Timor in 1999.

=== Return to East Timor (2000–2012) ===
Amaral relaunched his Timorese Social Democratic Association once he returned from exile. He was a candidate for President of East Timor in three presidential elections in 2002, 2007, and 2012.

In late 2001, his Timorese Social Democratic Association nominated him as a presidential candidate in the first post-occupation election, held in April 2002. His opponent in the 2002 election was his friend, Xanana Gusmão. Amaral publicly stated that he expected to lose to Gusmão, but believed that East Timor's young democracy deserved to have a real competition in the race. Gusmão won the election in a landslide.

Amaral ran for president for a second time in the April 2007 presidential election, taking fourth place with 14.39% of the vote in the first round. Another of Amaral's friends, Jose Ramos Horta, won the second round and was elected president.

Amaral received a cancer diagnosis in 2011. Amaral was one of thirteen candidates nominated for the 2012 presidential election, which was held on 17 March 2012. However, Amaral proved too seriously ill to appear at the official launch of the presidential campaign on 29 February 2012, which jeopardised his candidacy and the election. The National Parliament of East Timor met in a plenary session in early March 2012, specifically to amend the presidential election law so that Amaral's absence from the launch would not negate the entire election.

Francisco Xavier do Amaral died of cancer at Guido Valadares National Hospital in Dili at 8:44 a.m. on 6 March 2012, at the age of 74. Following a three day period of national mourning, he was given a state funeral and buried at the Metinaro Heroes Cemetery in Dili.

== Legacy ==
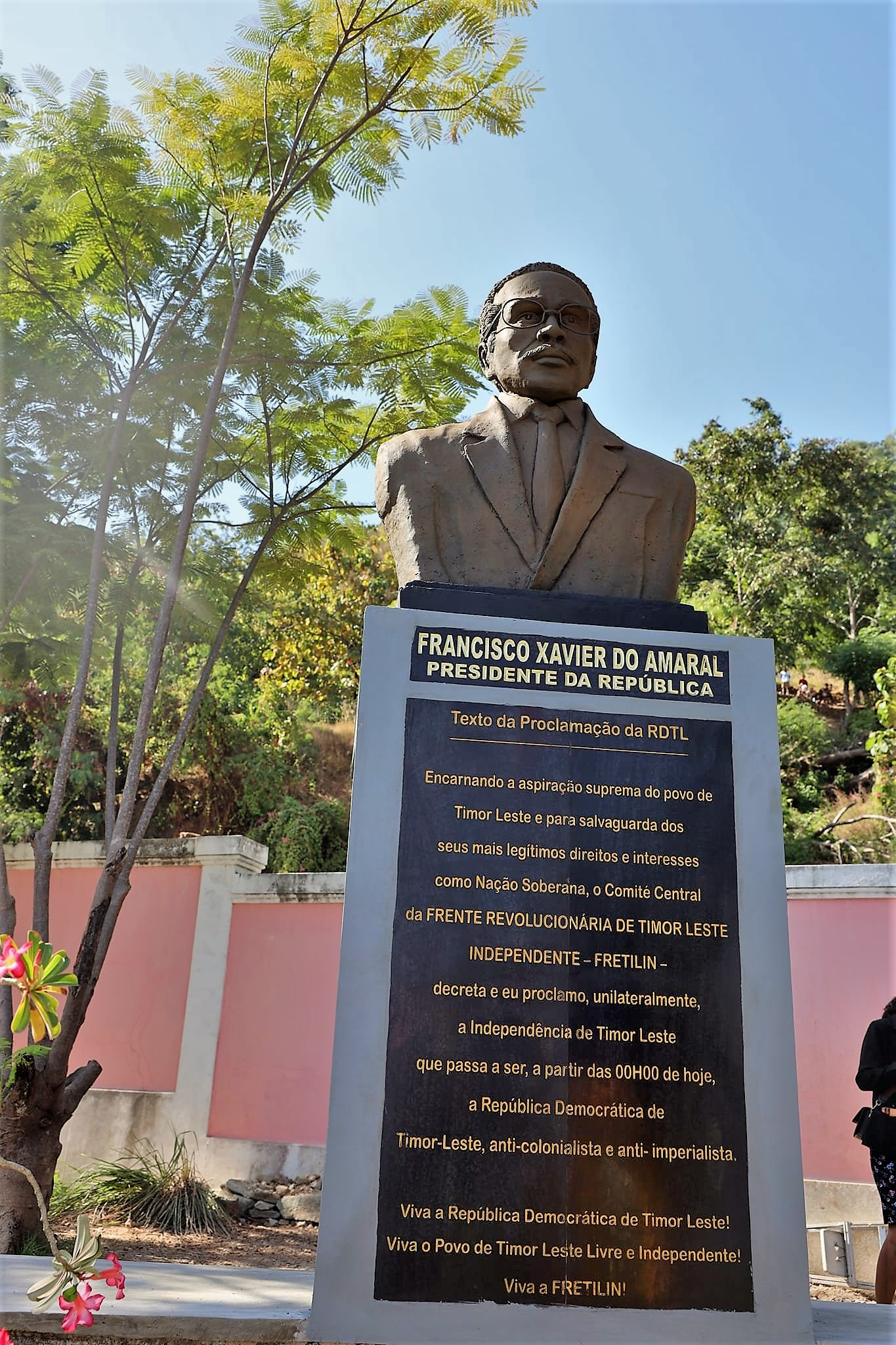
Xavier do Amaral monument

On 20 May 2017, for the 15th anniversary of the restoration of East Timor's independence, a statue of Francisco Amaral was inaugurated in Dili, at the roundabout near the Convention Center.

== Notes ==
Political offices
| Preceded by Mário Lemos Pires as Governor of Portuguese Timor | President of East Timor; 1975 | Succeeded by Nicolau dos Reis Lobato (titular) |
