= Aliança de Araújo =

East Timorese politician

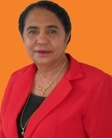
Aliança Araújo

Aliança da Conceição de Araújo (born 1952) is an East Timorese politician, and party leader of the Partido Timorense Democrático (Timorese Democratic Party) (PTD).

Araújo's husband Augusto Pereira was a senior police officer in the Indonesian police in occupied East Timor, and also a member of the resistance. In 1992 she hid the FALINTIL leader Xanana Gusmão from the occupiers in a bunker beneath her house in Dili. When Gusmão was discovered and arrested on 20 November 1992, the entire Araujo family was sent to prison. Aliança was tortured. She took over the sole responsibility for hiding the resistance fighters and thus relieved her husband.

Araújo sat for the Partido Nasionalista Timorense (Timorese Nationalist Party) (PNT) in the National Consultative Council, during the United Nations Transitional Administration in East Timor, and in the National Parliament of East Timor between 2001 and 2007. Her brother Abílio de Araújo is the head of PNT, and Aliança was vice-president of the party. Abílio and another brother, Afonso Redentor Araújo, who was captured and executed by the Indonesians in 1979, were co-composers of Pátria, the national anthem of East Timor.

In 2008, Aliança de Araújo founded the PTD.
