= 2002 East Timorese presidential election =

- 14 April 2002
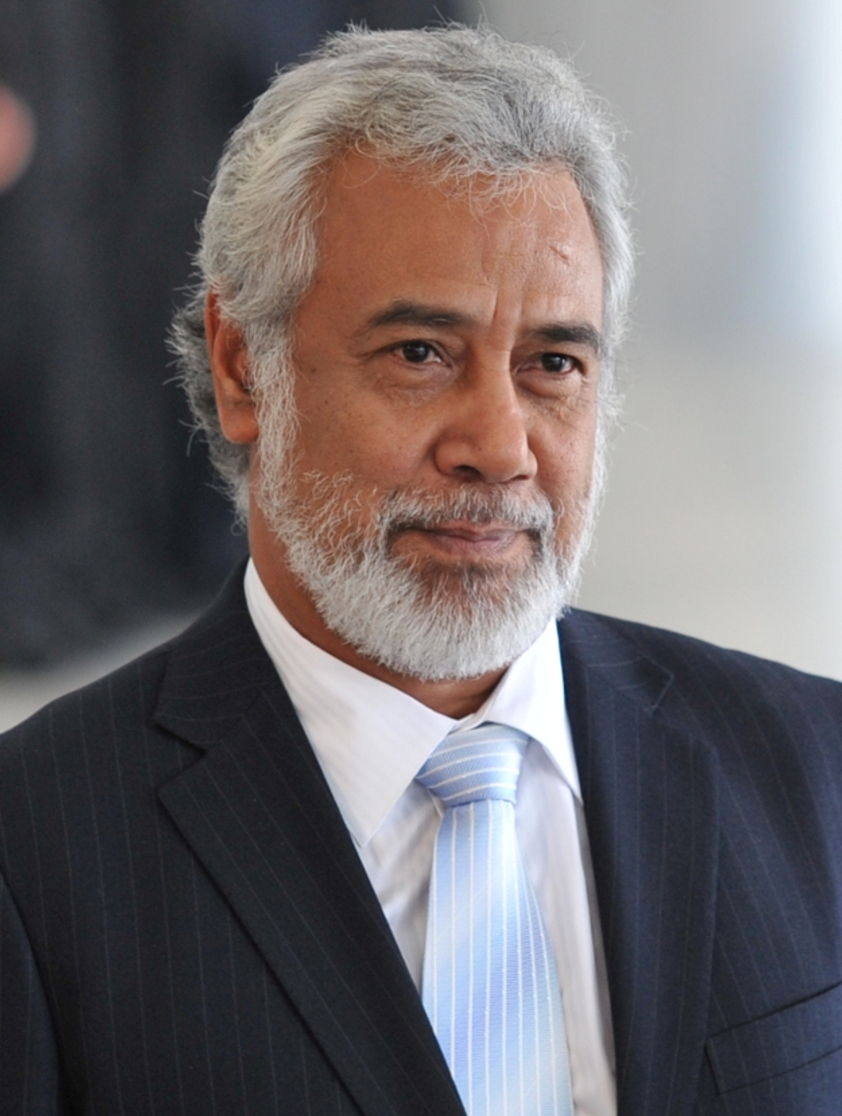

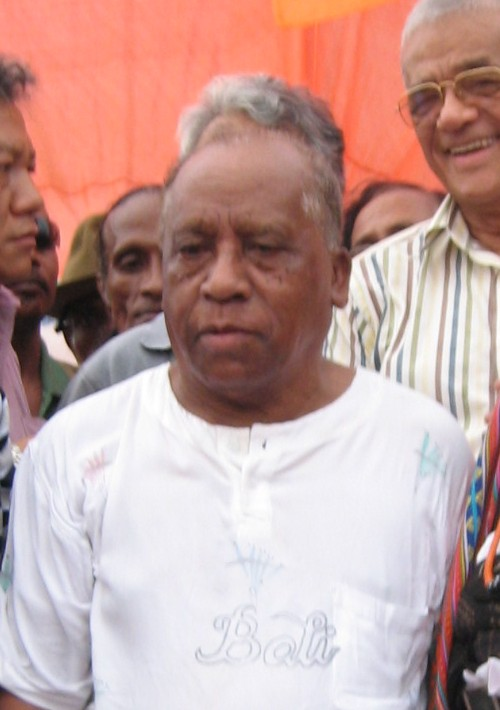
Candidate	Xanana Gusmão	Francisco Xavier do Amaral
Party	Independent	ASDT
Popular vote	301,634	63,146
Percentage	82.69%	17.31%
- Results by municipality
President before election
Sérgio Vieira de Mello
(As East Timor UN Transitional Administrator)
Independent
Elected President
Xanana Gusmão
Independent

Presidential elections were held in East Timor for the first time on 14 April 2002 under UN administration. As expected, the former president of the East Timorese resistance movement, Conselho Nacional da Resistencia Timorense, Xanana Gusmão, running as an independent candidate but with the unofficial support of small opposition parties like the Democratic Party, won a large majority. International monitors declared the election to be free and fair.

Gusmão only had one challenger, former FRETILIN president Francisco Xavier do Amaral, who had been sworn in as president when East Timor declared independence on 28 November 1975, though his term was short-lived as Indonesia invaded on 5 December. Do Amaral, now head of a new party, the ASDT, had admitted that he fully expected to lose to Gusmão, but felt that running was symbolically important, demonstrating the strength of East Timor's democracy by ensuring that Gusmão had competition in the race.

== Results ==
Candidate	Party	Votes	%
Xanana Gusmão	Independent	301,634	82.69
Francisco Xavier do Amaral	Timorese Social Democratic Association	63,146	17.31
Total		364,780	100.00
Valid votes		364,780	96.36
Invalid/blank votes		13,768	3.64
Total votes		378,548	100.00
Registered voters/turnout		446,256	84.83
Source: IFES
