= Mário Carrascalão =

East Timorese-Indonesian politician (1937–2017)

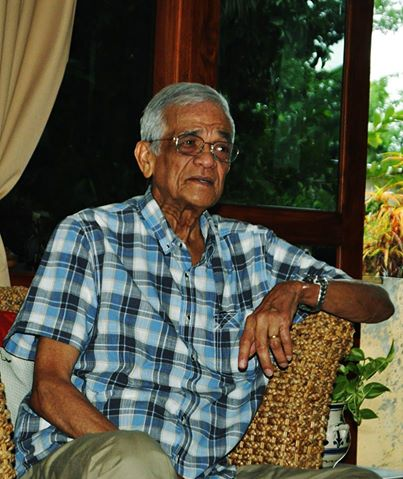
- Carrascalão in 2017

Deputy Prime Minister of East Timor IV Constitutional Government of East Timor
- In office March 5, 2009 – September 8, 2010
- President: José Ramos-Horta
- Prime Minister: Xanana Gusmão

Member of Supreme Advisory Council
- In office 1998–1999
- President: B. J. Habibie

Indonesian Ambassador to Romania
- In office 1994–1997
- President: Soeharto
- Preceded by: Lamtiur Andaliah Panggabean
- Succeeded by: Tjahjani Sukadi

Governor of East Timor under Indonesian occupation
- In office September 18, 1981 – September 18, 1992
- President: Soeharto
- Preceded by: Guilherme Maria Gonçalves
- Succeeded by: José Abílio Osório Soares

Personal details
- Born: Mário Viegas Carrascalão; May 12, 1937 Venilale, Portuguese Timor
- Died: May 19, 2017 (aged 80) Dili, East Timor
- Party: Social Democratic Party (since 2000); Golkar (until 1999)
- Parents: Manuel Viegas Carrascalão (father); Marcelina Guterres (mother)

Mário Viegas Carrascalão (May 12, 1937 – May 19, 2017) was an East Timorese politician and diplomat. Carrascalão, a founder of the Timorese Democratic Union (UDT) in 1974 and the Social Democratic Party (SDP) in 2000, served as the governor of East Timor from 1981 to 1992 during the Indonesian occupation of the country. However, he re-joined the East Timorese government following the 1999 independence referendum and the transition to independence. He later served as a deputy prime minister within the IV Constitutional Government of then-Prime Minister Xanana Gusmão from 2009 to 2010.

== Biography ==
=== Early life and education ===
Carrascalão was born in Venilale, Baucau District, Portuguese Timor, on May 12, 1937. He attended elementary school and Colegio-Liceu Dr. Vieira Machado in Dili. He then went to Portugal to finish high school at Liceu Camões in Lisbon and attend college. He graduated from the Instituto Superior de Agronomia in Lisbon in 1967 and the Technical University of Lisbon (now part of the University of Lisbon) in 1968.

He returned to Portuguese Timor after university, where he headed the territory's Forestry and Agriculture Department.

=== Indonesian occupation ===
In 1974, Carrascalão founded the Timorese Democratic Union (UDT) with Domingos Oliveira, César Mouzinho, António Nascimento, Francisco Lopes da Cruz, and Jacinto dos Reis in the aftermath of the Carnation Revolution in Portugal.

He and his brother, João Viegas Carrascalão, another member of the UDT, split following the Indonesian invasion of East Timor in 1975 and subsequent occupation of the country. João Carrascalão went into exile in Australia and Portugal, while Mário Viegas Carrascalão favored dialogue with the new Indonesian authorities.

Following violence by Fretilin, Carrascalão initially fled to Atambua and then Jakarta. He joined the Indonesian Ministry of Foreign Affairs' diplomatic corp in 1978 as a diplomat.

The Indonesian government, under Soeharto, appointed Carrascalão as the third governor of the new "province" from September 18, 1981 until September 18, 1992, when he was succeeded by the territory's last governor, José Abílio Osório Soares. During his tenure as Governor, Carrascalão denounced violence against the East Timorese people and has been credited with saving lives. He arranged agreements to allow East Timorese students to attend Indonesian universities.

Carrascalão held the first meetings between East Timorese provincial authorities and East Timorese rebels representing the Revolutionary Front for an Independent East Timor, or Fretilin. He personally met with Xanana Gusmão in Lariguto in 1983 and in Ariana in 1990, which marked the beginning of dialogue between the resistance and Indonesian authorities.

In November 2015 interview, Carrascalão explained his position of neutrality during the Indonesian occupation and conflict. Carrascalão explained that he had to remain neutral, because if he was seen as pro-independence, the Indonesian authorities would remove him from office. Meanwhile, he pursued policies which opened East Timor up to the rest of the world. He personally asked Soeharto to allow the British journalist Max Stahl to visit East Timor, something that he believed would not have occurred if he did not have a good working relationship with President Soeharto.

Carrascalão was appointed as Indonesia's Ambassador to Romania from 1993 to 1997. He then became an advisor to Indonesian President B. J. Habibie, especially on East Timorese affairs, following the Fall of Suharto in 1998 and the reform period under Habibie. President Habibie and the United Nations held the East Timorese independence referendum on August 30, 1999, in which voters overwhelmingly supported independence.

=== East Timorese independence ===
Carrascalão emerged as a key political figure in East Timor's transition from Indonesian occupation to full independence. He served as the Speaker of the National Council within the transitional government, as well as the Vice President of the National Council of Timorese Resistance.

In 2000, Carrascalão founded the new Social Democratic Party (SDP) and became the fledgling party's leader. He entered government after East Timor's full independence in 2002.

On March 5, 2009, Prime Minister Xanana Gusmão appointed Carrascalão as deputy prime minister of management and state administration within the IV Constitutional Government as part of a cabinet reshuffle. Carrascalão's Social Democratic Party (SDP), which he headed, was a member of Gusmão's governing coalition. The partnership between Prime Minister Gusmão and Deputy Prime Minister Carrascalão lasted until September 8, 2009, when Carrascalão resigned as deputy prime minister. In his resignation letter to Gusmão, Carrascalão lambasted the coalition government for failing to purchase construction supplies from a supplier he had recommended. Gusmão's government retorted that Carrascalão's preferred company would not have been able to fulfill the order and asked Carrascalão to retract his accusation. Carrascalão refused, writing, "At the age of 73, this is the first time anyone has ever called me stupid or a liar...My response is to resign from my position of deputy prime minister."

Carrascalão published an autobiography, "Timor – Before the Future", in 2006. President Taur Matan Ruak awarded him the Collar of the Order of Timor-Leste, the nation's highest honor, in recognition of his service on May 18, 2017.

=== Death ===
Carrascalão died a day later at the Hospital Nacional Guido Valadares in Dili, East Timor, on May 19, 2017, a week after his 80th birthday. His death was believed to be caused by a heart attack he suffered while driving alone through the Farol neighborhood of Dili. His car struck a pole and the sidewalk. He was taken to Hospital Nacional Guido Valadares where he died.
