= Timorese Social Democratic Association =

Timorese Social Democratic Association Associação Social-Democrata Timorense
- Leader: Francisco Xavier do Amaral
- Founded: 20 May 1974 (51 years, 323 days)
- Dissolved: 28 March 2018 (8 years, 11 days)
- Headquarters: Avenida do Direitos Humanos, Lecidere, Dili
- Ideology: Social democracy Third Way
- Political position: Centre to centre-left
- Colours: Yellow, Green, Blue, White, Red

Party flag

The Timorese Social Democratic Association (Portuguese: Associação Social-Democrata Timorense; abbreviated ASDT) was a political party in East Timor. Both the original ASDT of the 1970s (which became Fretilin) and the current party of the same name are founded by the late ex-Timorese President Francisco Xavier do Amaral.

In the parliamentary election held on 30 August 2001, the party won 7.8% of the popular vote and 6 out of 88 seats.

In the June 2007 parliamentary election, ASDT which was then led by Secretary General Gil Alves formed an alliance with the Social Democratic Party (PSD) which he stated that the coalition aims to establish a good collaboration, creating a system based on history, culture, experience and ability to govern. The program of the two related parties is based on a clear strategy that will bring progress in all sectors. Together they won 15.73% of the vote and 11 seats.

In 2012 party President Francisco Xavier do Amaral died, due to this and the previous problems made ASDT split into two, namely the Gil Alves camp as Secretary General and the interim President of the party and the João Correia camp which carried Ramos-Horta as honorary president. In the end the decision of the Court of Appeals of Timor-Leste in favor of João Correia's version of ASDT. In 2017 the same thing happened again, in the internal stronghold of the ASDT party there has been a power struggle between two camps, namely the Francisco da Silva camp as president and João Correia's camp as its leader. And because there are two versions of the ASDT party, the Court of Appeal stated that the ASDT party could not contest in the July 2017 parliamentary election. And since 2018 the party have not attended elections for five years either at the local and national level with their own program. The ASDT party must declare the loss of it status as a political party in accordance with the law and the decision made by Court of Appeal from the consequence for not submitting their candidate list for the May 2018 early parliamentary election. ASDT party appealed against the decision and was rejected. In 2021 the Court of Appeal again declared seven political parties that were declared dead since 2018 could no longer take part in general elections including ASDT.
