= List of political parties in Timor-Leste =

This article lists the current and former political parties in Timor-Leste. Timor-Leste is a democratic, multi-party state. The Indonesian parties that were represented in the country during the occupation period (1975-1999) are not listed. Official registration and admission of a party takes place at the Timor-Leste Supreme Court of Justice. This requires the signatures of 20,000 supporters, with 1000 signatures from each municipalities.

== Parties ==
=== Parliamentary parties ===
Five parties currently hold seats in the National Parliament:

Party	Abbr.	Founded	Ideology	Political position	MPs	Flag
National Congress for Timorese Reconstruction; Congresso Nacional de Reconstrução de Timor	CNRT	2007	Social democracy	Centre-left	31 / 65	
Revolutionary Front for an Independent East Timor; Frente Revolucionária de Timor-Leste Independente	Fretilin	1974	Social democracy; Democratic socialism; Left-wing nationalism; 1981–1984: Communism; Marxism-Leninism	Centre-left; 1981–1984: Far-left	19 / 65	
Democratic Party; Partido Democrático	PD	2001	Social liberalism; Decentralisation	Centre to centre-left	6 / 65	
Enrich the National Unity of the Sons of Timor; Kmanek Haburas Unidade Nasional Timor Oan	KHUNTO	2011	Unemployed youth interests; Anti-corruption		5 / 65	
People's Liberation Party; Partidu Libertasaun Popular	PLP	2015	Developmentalism; Fiscal conservatism	Centre	4 / 65	

=== Unrepresented parties ===
Party	Abbr.	Founded	Ideology	Political position	Flag
Timorese Democratic Union; União Democrática Timorense	UDT	1974	Conservatism; Nationalism; Factions: Regionalism (until 1975); Lusotropicalism (until 1975)	Right-wing	
Front for National Reconstruction of Timor-Leste – Change; Frente de Reconstrução Nacional de Timor-Leste – Mudança	FM	2011	Social democracy; Reformism	Centre-left	
Democratic Unity Development Party; Partidu Unidade Dezenvolvimentu Demokratiku	PUDD	c. 2016	Poverty reduction; Humanism		
Christian Democratic Party; Partido Democrata Cristão	PDC	2000	Christian democracy; Social democracy; Christian humanism	Centre-left	
Timorese Labour Party; Partido Trabalhista Timorense	PT, PTT	1974	Democratic socialism; Eco-socialism; Feminism	Centre-left	
Green Party of Timor; Partido os Verdes de Timor	Os Verdes	2022	Unemployed youth interests; Green politics		
Democratic Republic of Timor Party; Partido Democratika Republica de Timor	PDRT	c. 2007	Veterans' interests		
National Unity of Timorese Resistance; União Nacional Democrática de Resistência Timorense	UNDERTIM	2005	Veterans' interests; Populism		
Republican Party; Partidu Republikanu	PR	2005	Social democracy; Decentralisation; Progressivism; Pacifism	Centre-left	
Social Democratic Party; Partido Social Democrata	PSD	2000	Liberalism; Social conservatism	Centre	
Socialist Party of Timor; Partido Socialista de Timor	PST	1997	Communism; Marxism–Leninism	Left-wing to far-left	
Timorese Social Democratic Action Center; Centro Acção Social-Democrata Timorense	CASDT	2015	Social democracy	Centre to centre-left	
Hope of the Fatherland Party; Partido Esperança da Pátria	PEP	2012	Youth politics; Pacifism; Humanism		
People's Party of Development; Partido do Desenvolvimento Popular	PDP	2012	[data missing]		
Party of National Development; Partido do Desenvolvimento Nacional	PDN	2008	Conservatism		
Freedom Movement for the Maubere people Movimentu Libertasaun ba Povu Maubere	MLPM	2013	Christian humanism; Patriotism		
Timor-Leste National Republic Party; Partido Republika Nacional Timor Leste	PARENTIL	2001	Conservatism		
Timorese Democratic Party; Partido Timorense Democrático	PTD	2008	[data missing]		
Democratic Liberal Party; Partido Democrática Liberal	PDL	c. 2011	Conservative liberalism	Centre-right	
People's Freedom Party of the Aileba; Partidu Liberta Povu Aileba	PLPA	2009	Populism		
Timorese People's Monarchist Association; Associação Popular Monarquia Timorense	APMT	c. 2012	Monarchism		

=== Defunct and unregistered parties ===
Party	Abbr.	Founded	Dissolved	Ideology	Political position	Flag
Association of Timorese Heroes; Associação dos Heróis Timorenses	AHT	1974	2017	National conservatism; Cultural conservatism; Monarchism	Right-wing	
Christian Democratic Union of Timor; União Democrata-Crista de Timor	UDC	c. 1998	c. 2007	Christian democracy	Centre-right	
Liberal Party; Partai Liberal	PL	c. 2001	c. 2017	Conservative liberalism	Centre-right	
Millennium Democratic Party; Partido Milénio Democrático	PMD	2004	c. 2012	Feminism; Social democracy	Centre-left	
National Unity Party; Partido Unidade Nacional	PUN	2005	c. 2017	Christian democracy; Economic liberalism; Social conservatism; Agrarianism; Anti-communism	Right-wing	
People's Party of Timor; Partido do Povo de Timor	PPT	2000	c. 2012	Conservatism; Traditionalism; Monarchism	Right-wing	
Timorese Nationalist Party; Partido Nacionalista Timorense	PNT	1999	2012	Nationalism; Pre-independence: Autonomism; Pro-Indonesia		
Timorese Popular Democratic Association; Associação Popular Democratica Timorense	APODETI	1974	c. 2007	Conservatism; Autonomism; Indonesian integration (until 2000)	Right-wing	
Democratic Party of Maurebe; Partai Demokratik Maubere	PDM	2000	2001	APODETI Remnants; Conservatism		
Timorese Social Democratic Association; Associação Social-Democrata Timorense	ASDT	1974	2018	Social democracy; Third Way	Centre to centre-left	

Partido Timor Forte (PARTIFOR) is currently striving for registration, but as of January 2021 has not yet met all the requirements. The Party leader is Gregório Saldanha. The same applies to the Partidu Dezenvolvementu Sosiál (PDS). The application was rejected by FITUN in January 2021. The Partidu Unidade Dezenvolvimentu Nasionál (PUDN), which is active in 2021, has not yet provided any information on its application for registration. In 2023, the registration of the Aliança Nacional Democrata (AND) has not yet been completed.

== Party alliances ==
This list compiles the party alliances (coalitions) in Timor Leste with their own respective names, founding, member parties, and flags.

Alliances	Abbr.	Founded	Members	Flag
Aliança da Maioria Parlamentar	AMP	2007–2012	CNRT, PD, ASDT, PSD, UNDERTIM	
Aliança para Mudança e Progresso	AMP	c. 2017	CNRT, PLP, KHUNTO (Until 2018 Aliança da Maioria Parlamentar)	
Aliança Democrática KOTA/PPT	AD	2007	KOTA, PPT	
Aliança Democrática	AD	2012	KOTA, PTT	
Aliança Democrata	AD	2023	AND, PDP, PLPA	
Bloku Unidade Popular	BUP	2015–2018	PDRT, PMD, PLPA (until 2018), PST (until 2016), PARENTIL (until 2017)	
Coligação Bloco Proclamador	Bloco Proclamador	2012	PARENTIL, PMD	
Fórum Demokrátiku Nasionál	FDN	2017–2018	APMT, BUP, PST, PSD, PDP, MLPM, PDC	
Frente Ampla Democratica	FAD	c. 2023	UDT, FM, CASDT, PDN	
Frenti Dezenvolvimentu Demokratiku	FDD	2017–2018	PUDD, FM, UDT, PDN	
Liga Democrática Progressiva	LDP	2007–(?)	PDC, PDRT, PMD, PNT, PST, UDT	
Movimentu Dezenvolvimentu Nasional	MDN	c. 2018	APMT, MLPM, PLPA, UNDERTIM	
Movimento Social Democrata	MSD	c. 2018	PSD, PST, PDC, CASDT	

== Election results ==
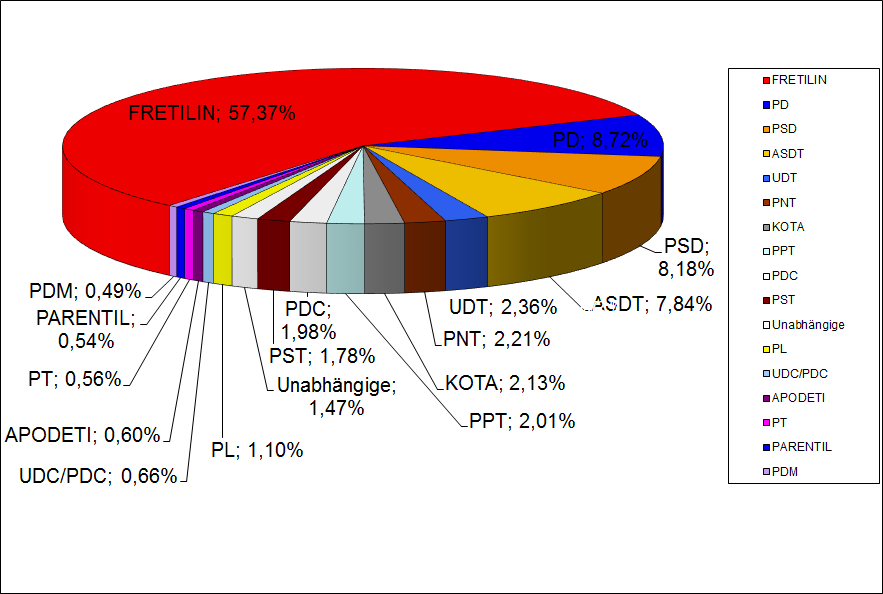
Final results of the
2001 East Timorese parliamentary election

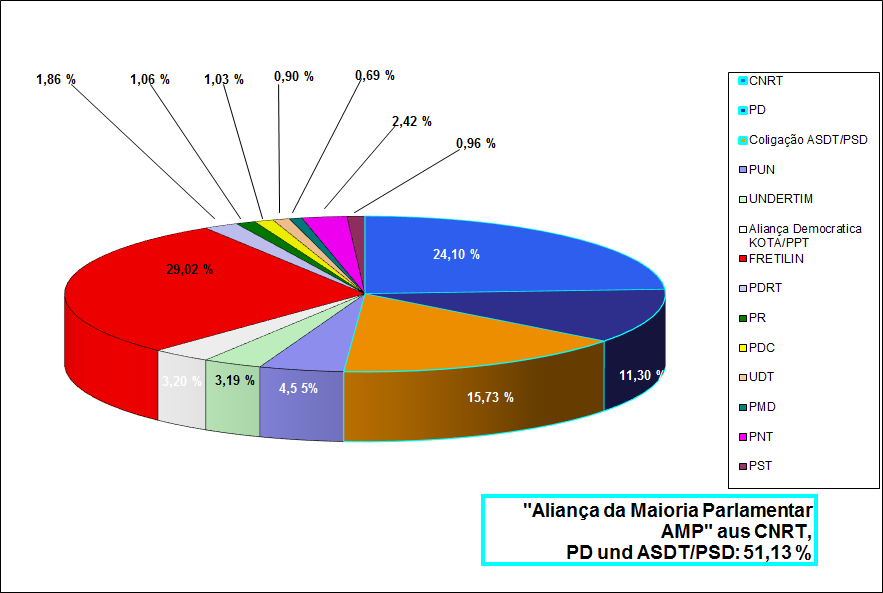
Final results of the
2007 East Timorese parliamentary election

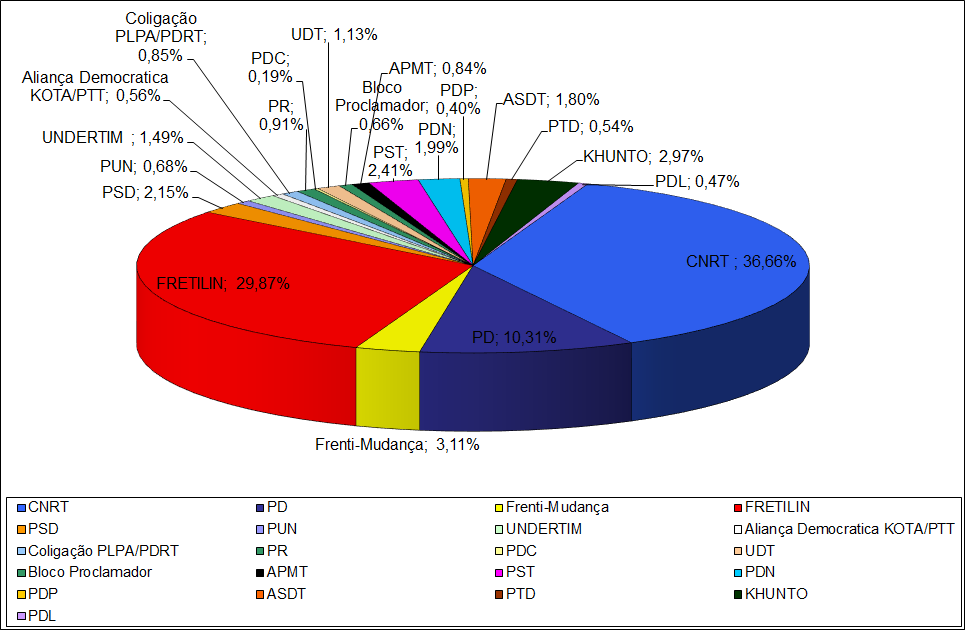
Final results of the
2012 East Timorese parliamentary election

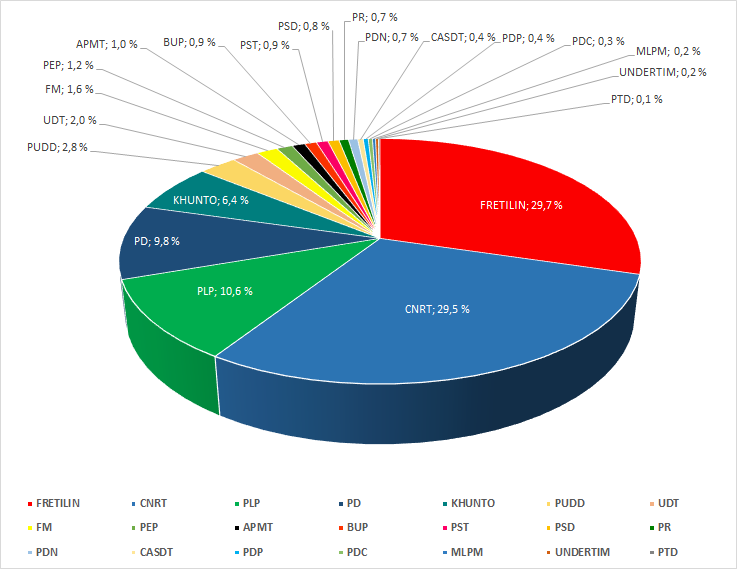
Final results of the
2017 East Timorese parliamentary election

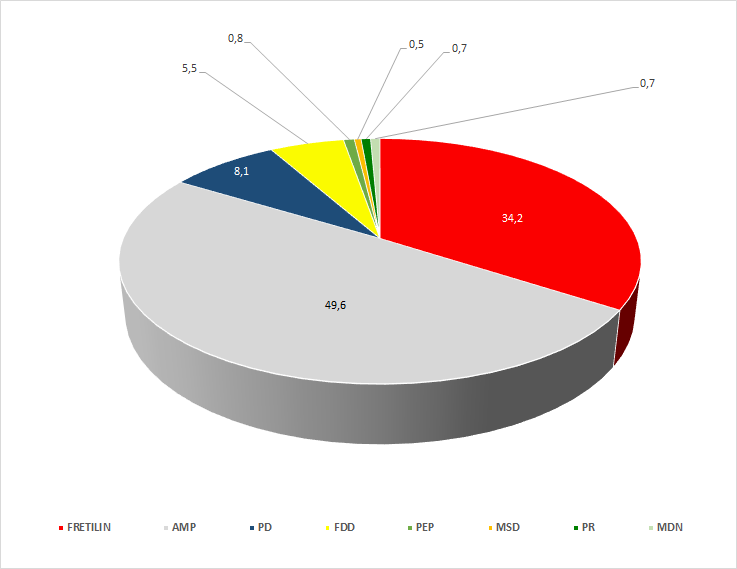
Final results of the
2018 East Timorese parliamentary election

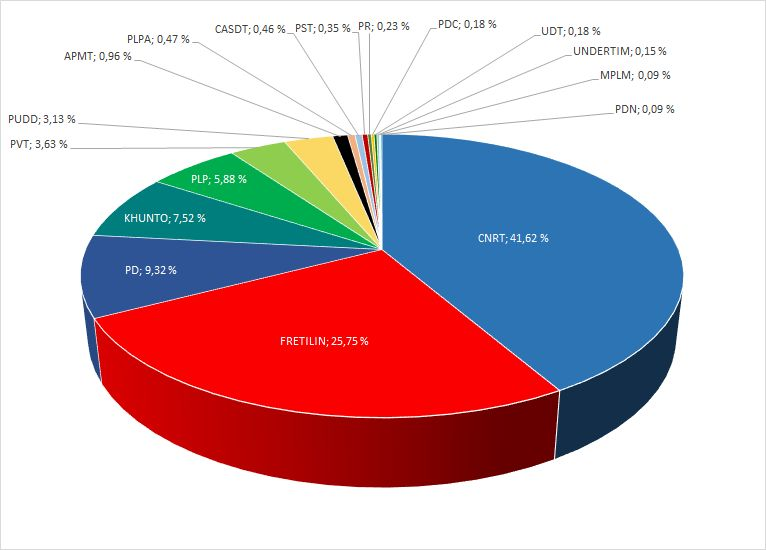
Final results of the
2023 East Timorese parliamentary election
