= 2012 East Timorese presidential election =

- 17 March 2012 (first round); 16 April 2012 (second round)
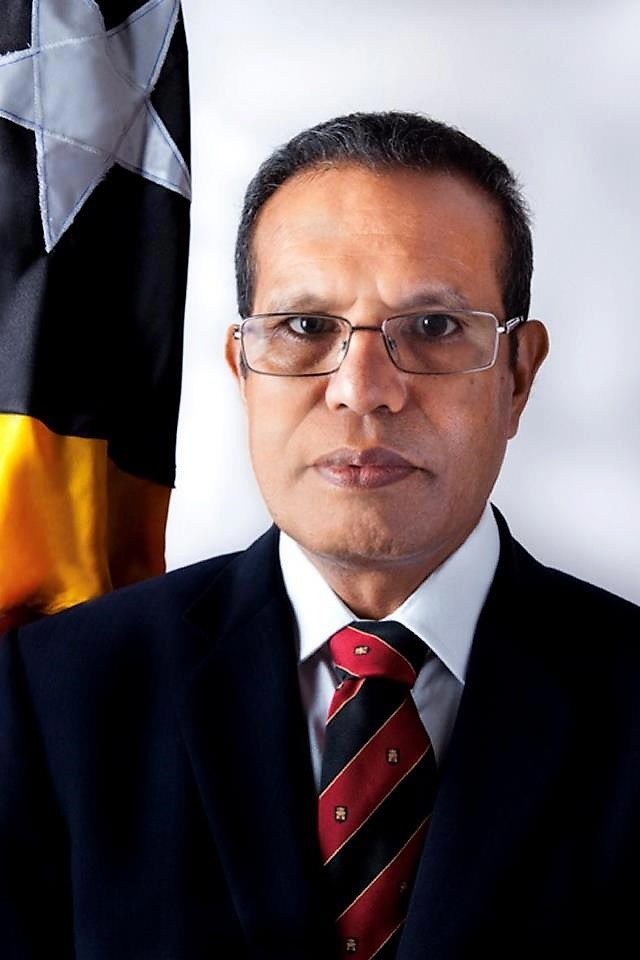

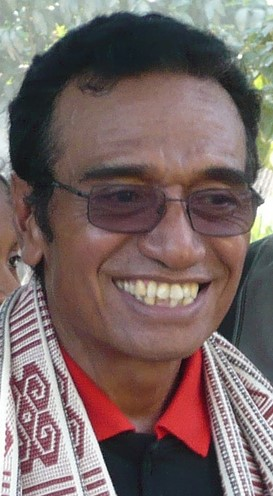
Candidate	Taur Matan Ruak	Francisco Guterres
Party	Independent	Fretilin
Popular vote	275,471	174,408
Percentage	61.23%	38.77%
President before election
José Ramos-Horta
Independent
Elected President
Taur Matan Ruak
Independent

Presidential elections were held in East Timor on 17 March 2012, with a second round on 16 April. Incumbent president José Ramos-Horta, who was eligible for a second and final term as president, announced that he would seek nomination to be a candidate in the election. The election was seen as a test for the "young democracy" in seeking to take control of its own security. Former military commander Taur Matan Ruak provisionally beat Francisco Guterres in a second round runoff.

== Background ==
The presidency is seen as a unifying post for the country after the 1999 East Timorese crisis. This election is also seen as a test FRETILIN's ability to take back control in the parliamentary election later in the year.

Incumbent president José Ramos-Horta had initially been reluctant to run for re-election, but a draft movement collected over 120,000 signatures in favour of his candidacy, prompting him to run.

== Candidates ==
There were finally twelve candidates running for president; two others eventually were excluded, one failing to meet the nomination requirements and another dying at the start of the election.

- Abílio Araújo
- Fernando de Araújo, speaker of the National Parliament of East Timor, president of the Democratic Party
- Maria do Céu
- Lucas da Costa
- Francisco Gomes
- Francisco Guterres, FRETILIN
- José Luís Guterres, vice prime minister, member of the Frente-Mudança
- José Ramos-Horta, incumbent president
- Rogério Lobato
- Angelita Pires
- Taur Matan Ruak, also known as TMR, former commander of the FALINTIL-Forças de Defesa de Timor-Leste (F-FDTL), the Military of East Timor. He is an independent candidate, but supported by East Timor's second biggest party, the National Congress for Timorese Reconstruction, (CNRT) and its leader, Prime Minister Xanana Gusmão.
- Manuel Tilman

The candidacy of Angela Freitas, was rejected by the CNE due to the ineligibility of some of the signatures required. She then offered her support to FRETILIN's Francisco Guterres. One candidate Francisco Xavier do Amaral, a member of the National Parliament of East Timor and a leader of Timorese Social Democratic Association, died during the campaign, on 5 March 2012. A special plenary session of parliament amended the electoral so as not to restart the electoral process as mandated by the older law. The controversial move elicited protests.

== Campaign ==
Economic issues were said to be the primary concern. According to the AFP, the most likely candidates were José Ramos-Horta, Francisco "Lu Olo" Guterres and Taur Matan Ruak. Ruak also said that he was confident of winning without a run-off. He won the backing of CNRT after it withdrew support for Ramos-Horta over criticism of the government; still, Ramos-Horta said he was not unhappy with the decision to support Ruak: "I'm very happy he's supporting one of my favourite candidates. If someone supports [Ruak] I'm happy because I admire [him]." Ruak was seen as likely to get some votes from FRETILIN's traditional base as he was popular with the party and repeatedly courted by the party hierarchy before opting to run as an independent after he quit his army post. However, there were also concerns of having someone affiliated to the army run for president because the army has sometimes disagreed with the police. Ruak campaigned wearing camouflage to highlight his role in the War of Independence.

Ramos-Horta said before the election that "If I'm not elected, I have so many things to do - I have to struggle to choose what to do." Xanana Gusmão campaigned for Ruak. Both Guitteres and Ruak said that they would abide by the outcome of the second round of the election. Ruak also said that he was proud to be Gusmão's deputy during the independence struggle. In the second round the Democratic Party and Ramos-Horta remained neutral.

== Monitors and electoral issues ==
International observers were present from Australia, the European Union, Asian Network for Free Elections (ANFREL) and Lusophone states. On 2 March, the CNE held a meeting, led by its president, Faustino Cardoso Gomes, with an EU delegation based in the country to discuss issues pertaining to the election and its monitoring. The Timor-Leste Friendship Network/Deakin University Observer Mission was an Australian observer group.

On 28 February, the National Electoral Commission (CNE) had organised a national initiative for the conduct of a peaceful election at the Dili Convention Centre. It was attended by traditional leaders from the 13 electoral districts and culminated in a pact being signed after a debate by the then 12 of 13 candidates (Francisco Xavier do Amaral did not attend the event due to ill health).

On 5 March, the CNE held a meeting with the political parties and presidential candidates to explain issues and rules about the campaigning process, the roles of political parties' and candidates' agents and campaign finance issues. The president of state-owned Radio-Televisão Timor Leste (RTTL) Expedito also elucidated RTTL's role in covering the election. Amongst the attendees were representatives of all 13 political parties and six presidential candidates.

The Deputy Secretary-General of UNMIT, Finn Reske-Nielson, said of the election that "we have seen a clean campaign that's been virtually free of violence. Every candidate has committed him or herself to peace." If the election turned out as planned UNMIT could also leave the country at the end of the year as per its current mandate.

== Violence ==
On 20 February, the offices of the CNE and the Technical Secretariat for Electoral Administration were firebombed at about 3:00 in the national capital of Dili. The attack also damaged a UNMIT vehicle. Australia's Sky News also suggested that witnesses had reported seeing serving members of the military campaign for Ruak amid what it said were fears of voter intimidation. However, Ramos-Horta said that he is "completely reassured about security. Our police and the United Nations police are alert all over the country. They have tremendous experience over the years in assessing the situation, in pre-empting any security threats so I am very confident it will be okay." However, Indonesia's ambassador, Eddy Setyabudi, said that the government of Indonesia was making contingency plans to evacuate 7,540 Indonesians from the country if the situation worsens and riots occur, following a meeting of the Indonesian-East Timor Border Coordination committee.

On 13 April, just before the second round, about 100 people were reported to have pelted Ruak's campaign headquarters with stones. More violence was reported over the burning of the homes of two "political supporters" and several campaign vehicles. National Police (PNTL) deputy commander Alfonso de Jesus said that due to the presence of police untoward incidents were not serious: "We had six police officers there but [if] straight away they are not respecting the police presence there then the group is using the opportunity to take stones and throw them at the office."

== Results ==
About 620,000 people out of a population of 1,100,000 are able to vote. There are 13 electoral districts in the country. Voting took place between 7:00 and 15:00 with no reports of untoward incidents. In at least one polling station that was monitored, the attendants unsealed the ballots delivered under United Nations Police protection. A high voter turnout was also recorded with some polling stations needing to use their reserve ballots.

Ermenegildo Lopes, the leader of the Bloku Ploklamador, said that his party's representatives indicated that no one would cross the 50% threshold to avoid a run-off. The AFP also said the election was "remarkably organised" in contrast to the pre-election violence in 2006. Ramos-Horta said of the election that "there has not been a single incidence of violence" and that he continues to believe the country is already ready to take control of its security.

The preliminary hand-counted result, broadcast live on RTTL, of over 70% of the votes indicated that Francisco Guterres was leading with 27.28% of the votes, followed by Taur Matan Ruak with 24.17% of the votes and incumbent president José Ramos-Horta followed with 19.43% of the votes (though Amaral had died, his name was still on the result notification issued by the election commission). Provisional results for the second round were scheduled to be announced within 48 hours of the polls closing, though they were announced a day earlier. Though the final result had to be certified by the Court of Appeals, Ruak had got 61.23% of the votes. Turnout was 72.1%.

Candidate	Party	First round		Second round	
Candidate	Party	Votes	%	Votes	%
Francisco Guterres	Fretilin	133,635	28.76	174,408	38.77
Taur Matan Ruak	Independent	119,462	25.71	275,471	61.23
José Ramos-Horta	Independent	81,231	17.48		
Fernando de Araújo	Democratic Party	80,381	17.30		
Rogério Lobato	Independent	16,219	3.49		
José Luís Guterres	Frenti-Mudança	9,235	1.99		
Manuel Tilman	Association of Timorese Heroes	7,226	1.56		
Abílio Araújo	Timorese Nationalist Party	6,294	1.35		
Lucas da Costa	Independent	3,862	0.83		
Francisco Gomes	People's Freedom Party of the Aileba	3,531	0.76		
Maria do Céu	Independent	1,843	0.40		
Angelita Pires	Independent	1,742	0.37		
Total		464,661	100.00	449,879	100.00
Valid votes		464,661	94.84	449,879	98.08
Invalid/blank votes		25,272	5.16	8,824	1.92
Total votes		489,933	100.00	458,703	100.00
Registered voters/turnout		627,295	78.10	627,295	73.12
Source: IFES, IFES

== Reactions ==
Ramos-Horta said that he had no disappointment over the result and that both the leaders were capable enough of ensuring peace and stability, which was his primary concern. He also conceded defeat and added: "On the stroke of midnight on May 19 I will hand over leadership of the country to the new president, one of the two who are now going for a second round." Ruak's spokesman Fidelis Magalhães said after the second round that "we are very much elevated by the result, by the current outcome. We expect to see some changes [in the final count], minor, probably one or two percentage points, but without a clear swing or fluctuation of points."

Ameerah Haq, the UN secretary-general's special representative for East Timor, was reported to have said that if the presidential and parliamentary elections go off without incidents the UNMIT would leave the country.

== Analysis ==
Al Jazeera suggested that a win for Ruak would adversely effect FRETILIN's position in the parliamentary election by showing support for Gusmão's incumbent coalition. The Australian suggested that the voting patterns were indicative of a tough negotiation process, after the parliamentary election, to form a government, even harder than the previous appointment of Xanana Gusmão after the 2006 East Timorese crisis. It pointed to the 2007 election in indicating that Ramos-Horta and Taur Matan Ruak's current performance, if seen as proxy CNRT candidates, showed a strengthening of voted by two or three percentage points. However, though, in the previous election Guiterres was unable to get more than three percent in between the two rounds signifying an inability to get third-party votes, in this election he gained 10 percent and the support of two minor parties. It also quoted the co-ordinator of the Timor-Leste Friendship Network/Deakin University Observer Mission Damien Kingsbury as saying Gusmão would be happier with the result than FRETILIN's leader Mari Alkatiri, who seeks to become prime minister again. To further complicate the government formation later in the year, The Australian also suggested that Fernando de Araujo's Democratic Party, which is a part of the coalition, is hindered by the poor relationship with Gusmão and that the Timorese Social Democratic Association has factionalised since the death of Amaral.

The Sydney Morning Herald attributed the result to personality politics. Analysing the voter returns, it suggested that supporters of the Democratic Party or Ramos-Horta voted for CNRT and sent a message to the party that it could lose its support base if it allied with FRETILIN. It similarly pointed out that while FRETILIN can consistently turn out plurality support, it is unable to gather majority support and that if FRETILIN had got a majority it would claim that Section 106 of the constitution the president would be obligated to choose a new prime minister from parliamentary support. The newspaper also said that compared to the previous election this one was "remarkably calm" with "few relatively minor disturbances compared."
