= Avelino Coelho da Silva =

East Timorese politician

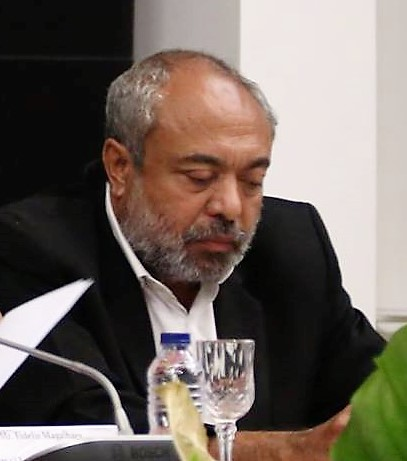
Avelino Coelho da Silva

Avelino Maria Coelho da Silva (b. Laclubar, Manatuto) was one of the candidates in the Presidential Elections in East Timor in April 2007.

He became involved in the clandestine resistance while he studied International Relations and Law in Jakarta. He is the leader of the Socialist Party of Timor (PST), which had a member in the National Parliament from 2002 to 2007.

In the 2007 presidential election, Avelino took seventh place with 2.06% of the vote.

Following the June 2007 parliamentary election, in which the Socialist Party did not win any seats, Avelino was appointed Secretary of State for Energy Politics in the government of Xanana Gusmão, which was sworn in on 8 August 2007.
