= Cláudio de Jesus Ximenes =

His Excellency Cláudio Ximenes
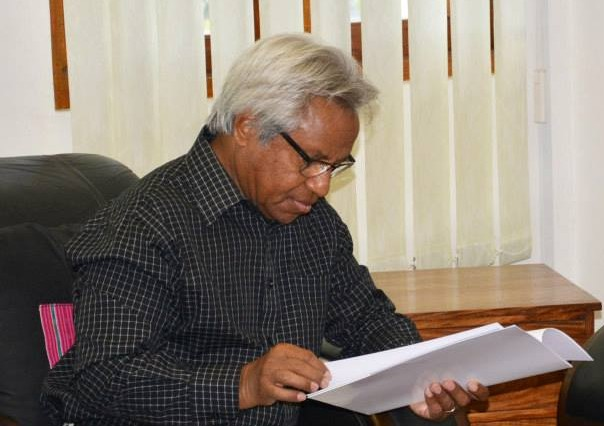
- In service

President of the Timor-Leste Justice of Supreme Court Timor-Leste
- In office 2003 - 2014
- Preceded by: -
- Succeeded by: Guilhermino da Silva

President of the Superior Council of the Judiciary Timor-Leste

Personal details
- Born: Ermera, Timor-Leste
- Education: University of Lisbon

Cláudio de Jesus Ximenes, (b. in Ermera, in the west part of Timor-Leste) is the President of the Court of Appeal of Timor-Leste, first appointed in 2003.

Ximenes was recently reappointed to a third term as Judge and President of the Court of Appeal, the highest judicial authority in the country, analogous to the United States' Supreme Court. He is also the President of the Superior Council for the Judiciary.
