= Green Party of Timor =

Political party in East Timor

Green Party of Timor Partido os Verdes de Timor
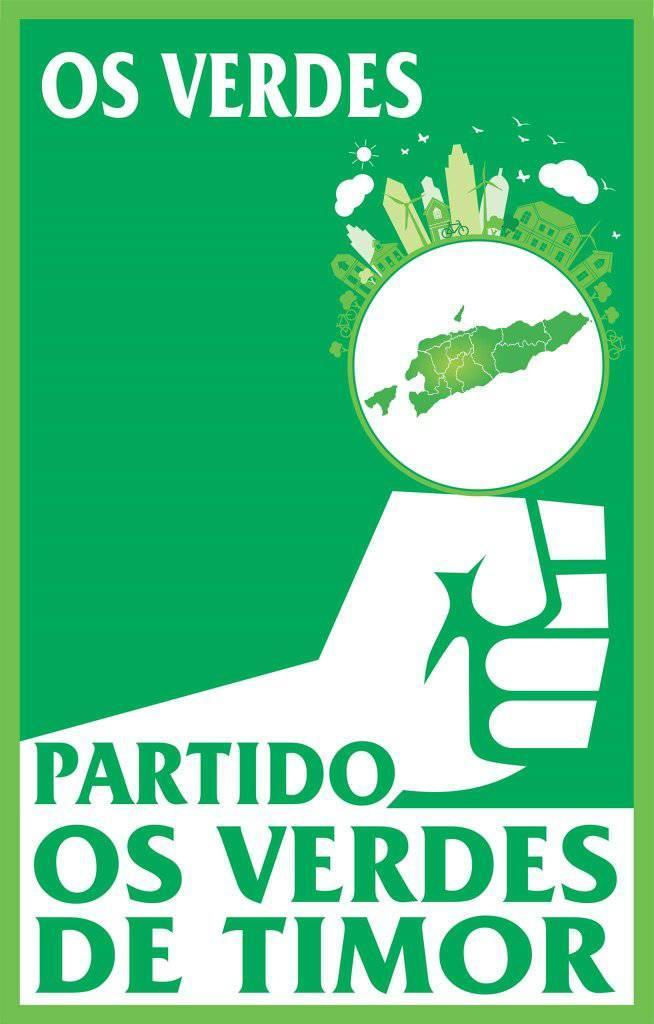
- Abbreviation: Os Verdes
- President: António Lela Hunu Cruz
- Registered: 21 April 2022; 2 years ago
- Ideology: Unemployed youth interests Green politics
- Colours: Green
- National Parliament: 0 / 65

Party flag
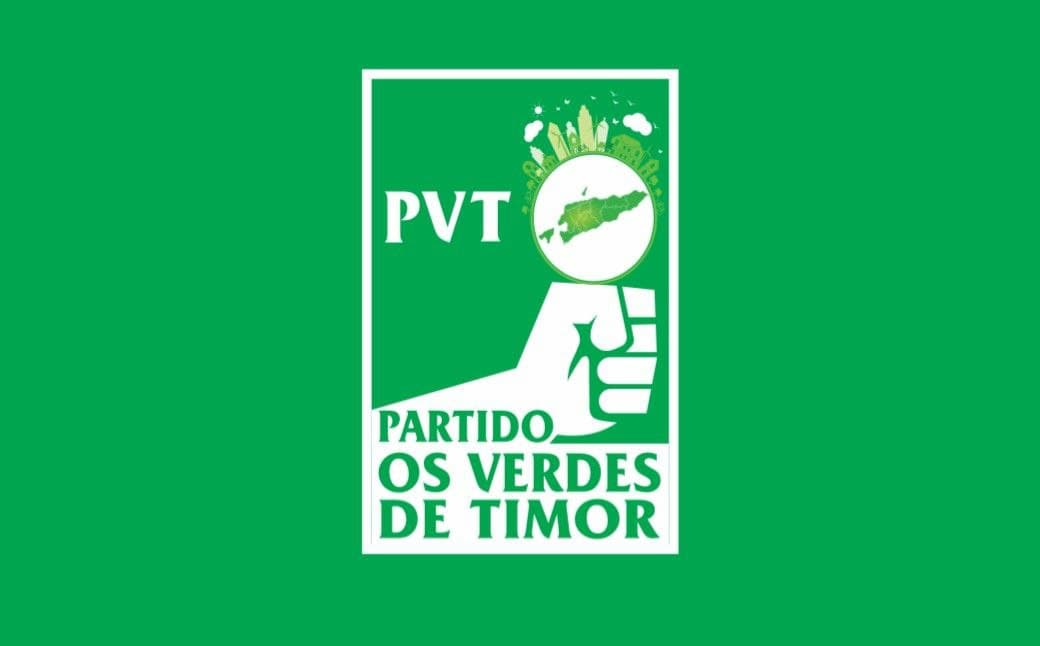

Website
- Official Facebook page

The Green Party of Timor (Portuguese: Partido os Verdes de Timor), commonly known as The Greens (Portuguese: Os Verdes), is a political party in East Timor.

== History and background ==
Twice the party failed in its attempt to register officially with the East Timor Supreme Court of Justice. The first time, in January 2021, the criteria for identifying signatories were not met. In the second attempt, there were irregularities with the records from four municipalities. On 21 April 2022, the court finally granted provisional approval, which was officially published on 26 April. On 5 April, the East Timorese Ministry of Justice had already confirmed the receipt of the necessary 20,000 signatures.

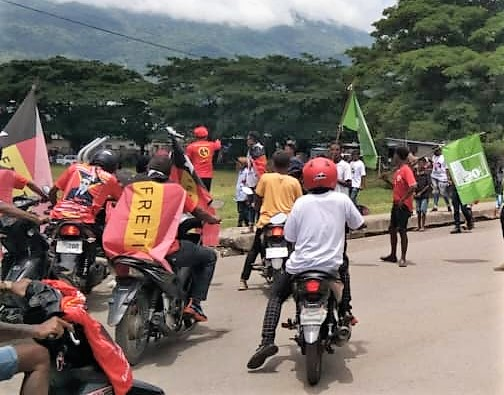
Fretilin and Green activists at the 2022 election campaign

According to the press, the party has its strongest supporters among members of the ritual arts groups 7-7, whose symbols can be found in many parts of the state capital Dili.

On 30 January 2022, the party gave its leader António Lela Hunu Cruz the power to decide on a candidate for the 2022 East Timorese presidential election. However, the deadline to officially notify the court on 4 February passed. Instead, the Greens publicly supported the incumbent Francisco Guterres of the left-leaning Fretilin. Green supporters appeared as endorsers with their party flags at campaign events, along with activists. However, the presidential election was won by José Ramos-Horta.

In the 2023 East Timorese parliamentary election, the PVT narrowly missed the four percent hurdle with 3.63% (25,106 votes).

== Political contents ==
The PVT says it wants a "resilient, inclusive and sustainable society". It wants to represent unemployed youth, traditions, the disabled and environmental protection. Based on the 7-7, President Hunu Cruz calls "ritual, cultural, spiritual and heritage arts part of East Timor" and belonging to the "principle of the 7-7" and the party.

Logo of PSI

The party's logo with the clenched fist is clearly derived from the logo of Indonesian Solidarity Party (PSI), itself a variation of the Fist and rose symbol.

== Election results ==
=== Legislative elections ===
| Election | Party leader | Votes | % | Seats | +/– | Position | Status |
|---|---|---|---|---|---|---|---|
| 2023 | António Lela Hunu Cruz | 25,106 | 3.63% | 0 / 65 | New | ▲6th | Extra-parliamentary |
