= Socialist Party of Timor =

Socialist Party of Timor Partido Socialista de Timor
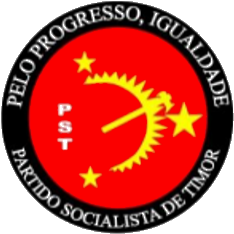
- Abbreviation: PST
- President: Avelino Coelho da Silva
- Vice President: Domingos Caeresi
- 1st Secretary General: Pedro Sarmento
- 2nd Secretary General: Ana Pereira Soares
- 3rd Secretary General: Joanica Pereira dos Santos
- Founded: 20 December 1990 (claimed); 11 February 1997
- Split from: FRETILIN
- Headquarters: Rua Colegio das Madres Balide, Quintal Bot., Dili, Timor-Leste
- Ideology: Communism; Marxism–Leninism
- Political position: Left-wing to far-left
- Colours: Red, Black, Yellow
- National Parliament: 0 / 65

Party flag
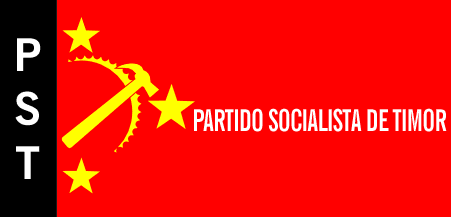

Website
- https://pstimor.wordpress.com/

The Socialist Party of Timor (Portuguese: Partido Socialista de Timor, PST) is a Marxist–Leninist political party in Timor-Leste (formerly East Timor).

== History ==
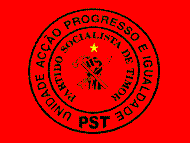
Flag of the Socialist Party of Timor until 2007

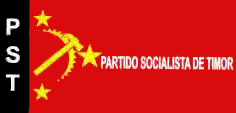
Flag of the Socialist Party of Timor until 2012

The Socialist Party of Timor was founded in February 1997, whilst East Timor was still under Indonesian occupation (though it claims it was founded earlier on 20 December 1990). It is a splinter party of the Fretilin and was established by Avelino Maria da Silva Coelho, Pedro Martires da Costa and Antonio Maher Lopes. Labour and student groups based in the Indonesian capital of Jakarta and other Indonesian cities where East Timorese studied and worked formed the basis of PST's members. The party's first national congress was held from 10 to 11 February 2000 in Dili, the capital of Timor-Leste.

== Organisation ==
The party is represented in many communities and focuses its work on the traditional FRETILIN areas, such as Soibada and Aileu. Its members are mostly young people, but also some old members of the left wings of FALINTIL and FRETILIN. Some cooperative farms were set up by the party. The party structure includes a Politburo, a Central Committee with 82 members, and party organizations for labour, women and youth. The party newspaper Vanguarda is also published irregularly.

The PST's political structure includes a political bureau, a central committee with 82 members, and labour, women's, and youth wings. The party also irregularly publishes a newsletter named Vanguarda. Links with Timorese unions exist but are very small due to few industrial jobs. The PST has various international ties, such as the Portuguese Communist Party, the Dutch Greens, Australia's Democratic Socialist Party, and Indonesia's People's Democratic Party. Connections to Abílio Araújo and his PNT are denied as well as a hostile attitude towards the Church. The party has international ties with a range of political organisations and trade unions in Portugal, Western Europe, Australia and Indonesia.

== Ideology ==
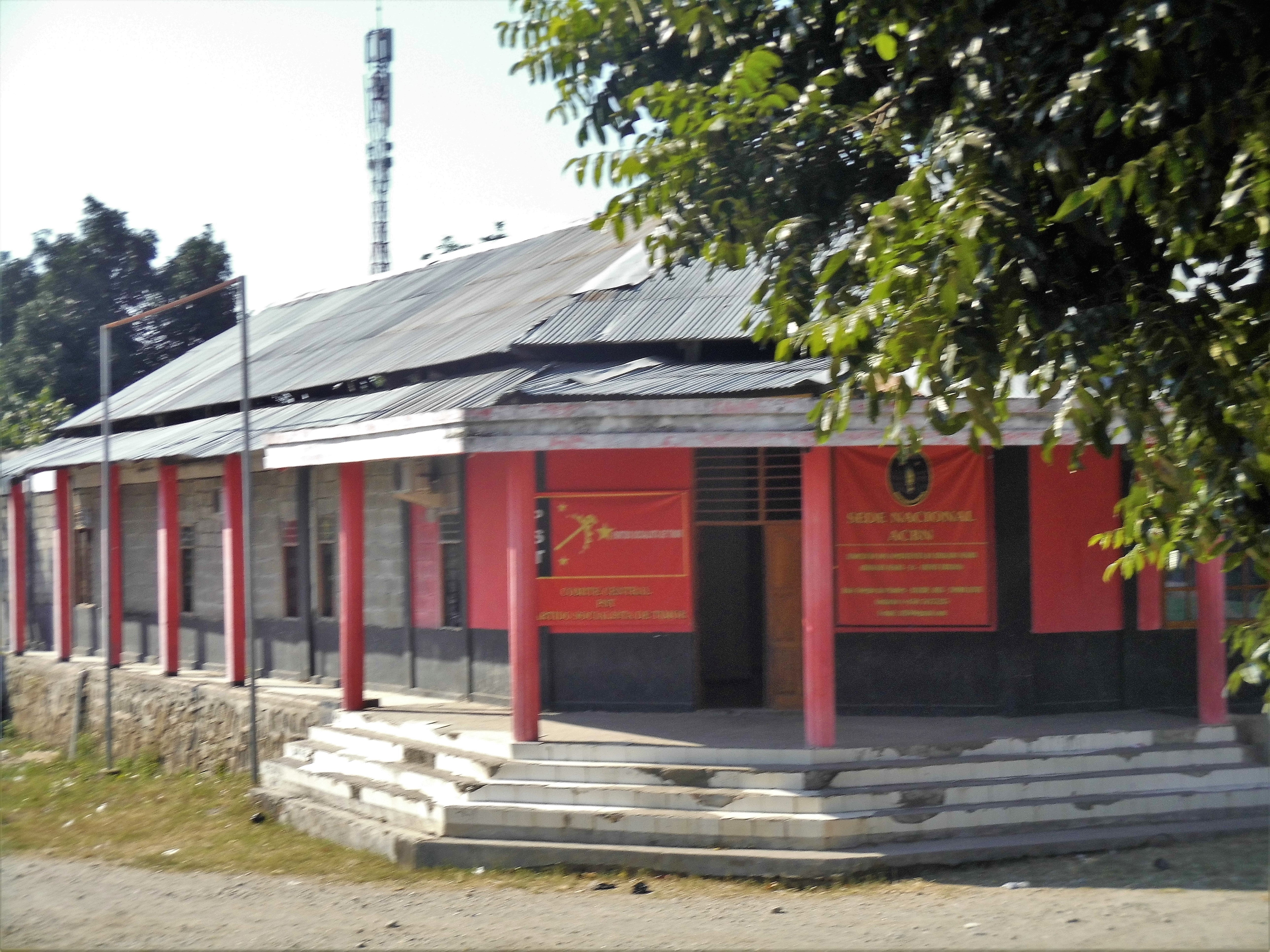
Headquarters of the PST in Mascarenhas (Vera Cruz)

The PST supports the democratic and parliamentary multi-party system, the separation of powers, free press and free access to information, freedom of religion, gender equality, the right to divorce and human rights. It demands free access to education and the abolition of social classes. The party stands by workers' rights, including free trade unions, and demands a right to work and a home, as well as equal pay for equal work. Child labor should be banned, as should Prostitution and Polygamy. Agriculture is to be further developed as the basis of the economy and microcredits are to be used to promote rural areas. Agricultural land should be distributed evenly, large estates should be expropriated. The focus is on collective ownership. Tourism should also be promoted. Access to the healthcare system should be free, and the environment should be protected. The PST supports the abolition of the Death penalty and calls for a maximum prison sentence of 10 years. Prisons are primarily intended to serve the rehabilitation of prisoners.

During the post-independence Timor-Leste period in 2002, the PST advocated Portuguese and English as official languages until Tetum was developed. Today the party demands that in future Portuguese should only be the working language, but no longer the national language (compare Timor-Leste's languages). That Indonesian government property in Timor-Leste was to be confiscated and nationalized, and society reconciled after the occupation period (1975–1999). The PST advocated good neighborly relations with the countries of the Pacific-Asia region and the Community of Portuguese Language Countries (CPLP).

The goal of the PST is a socialist, classless society in Timor-Leste, free from any colonialism, imperialism, paternalism and exploitation. This should be achieved peacefully through education and raising awareness. The PST is primarily concerned with the situation of the workers and peasants.

== Members ==
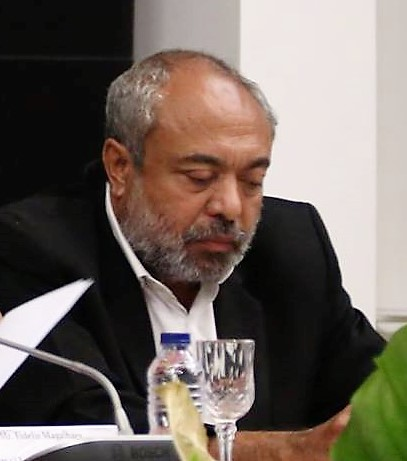
Avelino Coelho da Silva (2019)

2001 party leader was Pedro dos Mártires da Costa. He also represented the PST and as a Member of Parliament in Timor-Leste's National Parliament from 2001 to 2007. Deputy Secretary from 1999 to 2002 was Merício Hornay dos Reis, Secretary General and thought leader of the party Avelino Coelho da Silva, Deputy Secretary General Antonio Maher Lopes (common name: Fatuk Mutin ), party spokesman Nelson Correia. From 1999 to 2002, Merício Juvinal dos Reis was vice-president of the PST, but left the party in 2003.

In 2007 Pedro dos Mártires da Costa switched to the conservative National Congress for Timorese Reconstruction (CNRT). The new party chairman was Nelson Correia (at least until 2010), Secretary General continues to be Avelino Coelho da Silva.

In 2011, Avelino Coelho da Silva took over the party chairmanship and still holds it (as of 2017). New Secretary General was Pedro Sarmento, second Secretary General Ana Pereira Soares, third Secretary General Joanica Pereira dos Santos. Current General Secretary (as of 2016) is Manuel Azancot de Menezes. Deputy party leader Hélder Lopes died in 2017, 2020 Deputy Secretary General Luciano Hornay at the age of 42, and 2022 Deputy Secretary General João Bosco Cárceres.

== Election results ==
In the parliamentary election held on 30 August 2001, the party won 1.8% of the popular vote and 1 out of 88 seats. In the parliamentary election held on 30 June 2007, the party won 0.96% of the vote and did not win any seats, as it did not reach the 3% threshold for winning seats.

In the 2007 parliamentary election, the PST won less than 1% of the vote and failed to win a seat. The party's candidate in the April 2007 presidential election was Avelino Coelho da Silva, who took seventh place with 2.06% of the vote.

In the October 2009 local elections, the PST won 79 out of 4,889 positions.

=== Legislative elections ===
| Election | Party leader | Votes | % | Seats | +/– | Position | Government |
|---|---|---|---|---|---|---|---|
| 2001 | Pedro dos Mártires da Costa | 6,483 | 1.78% | 1 / 88 | New | ▲10th | Opposition |
| 2007 | Nelson Correia | 3,982 | 0.96% | 0 / 65 | ▼1 | ▼12th | Extra-parliamentary |
| 2012 | Avelino Coelho da Silva | 11,379 | 2.41% | 0 / 65 | 0 | ▲6th | Extra-parliamentary |
| 2017 | Avelino Coelho da Silva | 4,891 | 0.86% | 0 / 65 | 0 | ▼12th | Extra-parliamentary |
| 2018 (Note: Run as part of the Social Democratic Movement coalition (CASDT, PSD, PST and PDC).) | Avelino Coelho da Silva | 3,188 | 0.51% | 0 / 65 | 0 | ▲8th | Extra-parliamentary |
| 2023 | Avelino Coelho da Silva | 2,415 | 0.35% | 0 / 65 | 0 | ▼11th | Extra-parliamentary |
