= Timorese Social Democratic Action Center =

Timorese Social Democratic Action Center Centro Acção Social-Democrata Timorense
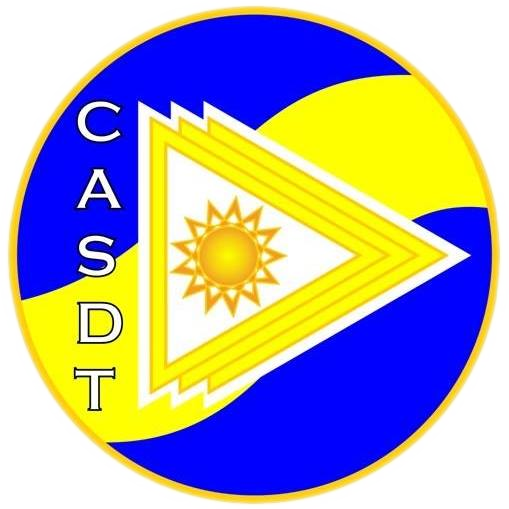
- Leader: Gil da Costa A.N. Alves
- Founded: 2 September 2015
- Headquarters: Rua Beco Aidik Kulit, Aimutin, Dili
- Ideology: Social democracy
- Political position: Centre to centre-left
- Colours: Gold, White, Blue, Yellow
- National Parliament: 0 / 65

Party flag
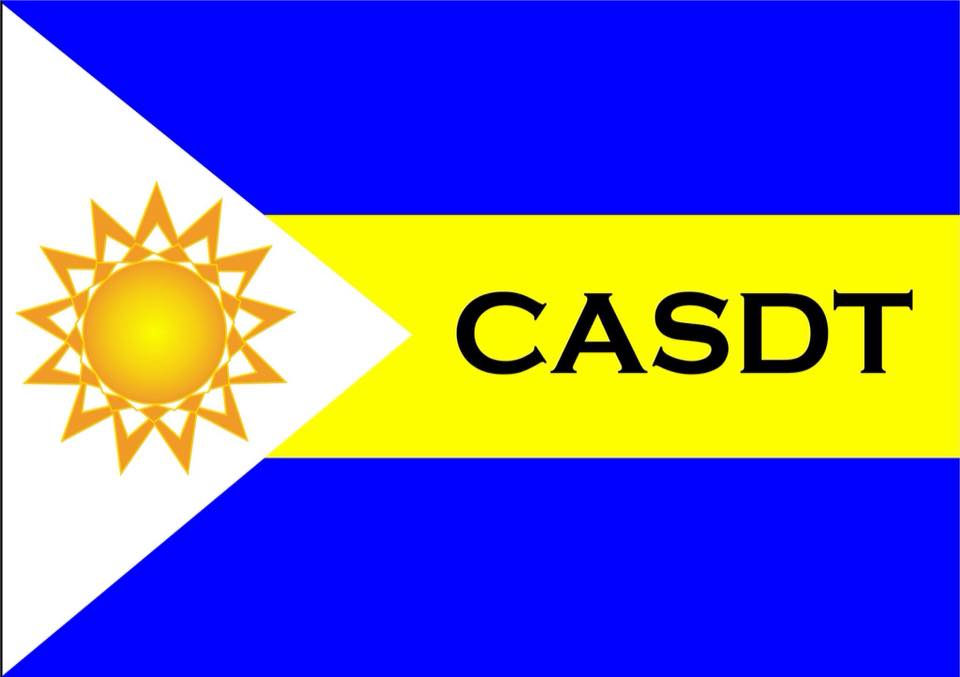

Website
- www.centroasdt.com

The Centro Acção Social-Democrata Timorense (English: Timorese Social Democratic Action Center), abbreviated as Centro ASDT or CASDT is a political party in Timor-Leste. Founded by its late first party president Gil da Costa A.N. Alves, he was the former Secretary General of the Associação Social-Democrata Timorense (ASDT) party. The party motto is “Justiça, Unidade, Solidaridade” ( English: Justice, Unity, Solidarity ).

== History ==
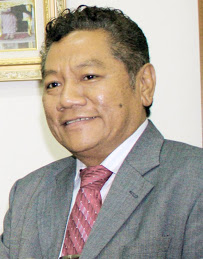
Gil da Costa A.N. Alves, Founder & First President of Centro ASDT party.

Centro ASDT was officially recognized as a political party on 2 September 2015 by the Tribunal de Recurso de Timor-Leste (English: Timor-Leste Court of Appeal). The party's first National Congress took place on 19 December 2015 in the hall of the Comissão Nacional de Eleições (English: National Elections Commission).

In the previous presidential election in 2017, Centro ASDT supported the Fretilin presidential candidate, Francisco "Lú-Olo" Guterres, who eventually won. Centro ASDT officially contested the parliamentary elections in July 2017. However, the vote obtained by the Centro ASDT party was only 0.41%, less than the 4% threshold that had been determined.

In March 2018, Centro ASDT together with three other parties established the Movimento Social Democrata (MSD) coalition to take part in the early parliamentary elections on 12 May 2018. One of the programs of this coalition is to establish the provinces of Ramelau, Kablaki and Matebian because development in Timor-Leste is too Dili-centric. However, MSD did not make it past the specified threshold because it only won 0.5% of the total votes cast.

While the Centro ASDT party itself is also being recognized as a transformation and successor from previous historic party ASDT, in July 2021 nearing the 2022 presidential election its Party Counsellor Aida Maria Osorio Soares said the party had no candidate for the presidential election. But will listen to any presidential candidate who approach the party and a decision will come through consideration also discussion among itself.

== Ideology ==
Centro ASDT sees itself in the tradition of the Associação Social-Democrata Timorense, which Gil da Costa Alves had to abandon as a result of the decision of the Tribunal de Recurso de Timor-Leste in 2012. Apart from Alves, it can be seen that Francisco Xavier do Amaral, the founder of ASDT remains in as the progenitor of Centro ASDT. CASDT sees Social-Democrata Timorense (SDT) as Timor-Leste's original ideology and pioneer, so that even in the era of globalization and modern technology, the young generation of Timor-Leste are still able to compete in global competition but proudly use the principles championed by the national heroes. Where other countries have also expelled the invaders and learned to stand on their own feet and proud to use their own “unique” ideology, the people of Timor-Leste can too.

== Party Hymn ==
The text of the Centro ASDT party hymn is as follows:

CASDT DO POVO

Vindos duma história longa e dura
lutamos e alcançámos a vitória
honra e glória aos heróis da pátria
avante unidos iremos construir
p’ra que o povo viva feliz

Reff.
UNIDOS, NÓS VENCEREMOS
LEVAMOS NOS CORAÇÕES
OS SONHOS DE TIMOR-LESTE
P’LA PAZ E PROGRESSO
CASDT DO POVO, P’LO POVO E P’RO POVO

Herdamos a luta secular do povo
p’la liberdade e independência
firmes na justiça e na solidariedade
unidos lutamos pelo povo
pelo progresso e harmonia

== Election results ==
=== Legislative elections ===
| Election | Party leader | Votes | % | Seats | +/– | Position | Status |
|---|---|---|---|---|---|---|---|
| 2017 | Gil da Costa A.N. Alves | 2,330 | 0.41% | 0 / 65 | New | ▲18th | Extra-parliamentary |
| 2018 (Note: Run as part of the Social Democratic Movement coalition (CASDT, PSD, PST and PDC).) | Gil da Costa A.N. Alves | 3,188 | 0.51% | 0 / 65 | 0 | ▲8th | Extra-parliamentary |
| 2023 | Gil da Costa A.N. Alves | 3,170 | 0.46% | 0 / 65 | 0 | ▼10th | Extra-parliamentary |
