= Christian Democratic Party (Timor-Leste) =

Christian Democratic Party Partido Democrata Cristão
- Leader: António Ximenes
- Founded: 5 August 2000
- Ideology: Christian left
- Political position: Centre-left
- National Parliament: 0 / 65

Party flag
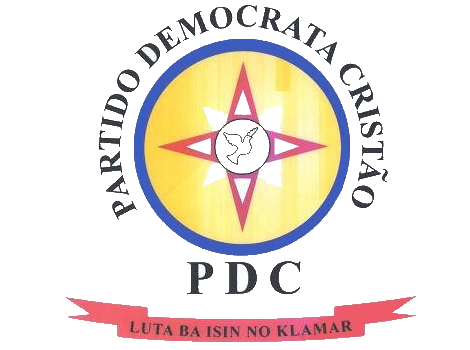

The Christian Democratic Party (Portuguese: Partido Democrata Cristão) is a centre-left political party in Timor-Leste.

In the parliamentary election held on 30 August 2001, the party won 2.0% of the popular vote and 2 out of 88 seats. In the parliamentary election held on 30 June 2007, the PDC won 4,300 votes, 1.03% of the total, and did not win any seats in parliament, as it did not reach the 3% threshold to win seats.

== Election results ==
=== Legislative elections ===
Election	Party leader	Votes	%	Seats	+/–	Position	Government
2001	António Ximenes	7,181	1.98%	2 / 88	New	▲9th	Opposition
2007	António Ximenes	4,300	1.03%	0 / 65	▼2	▼11th	Extra-parliamentary
2012	António Ximenes	887	0.19%	0 / 65	0	▼21st	Extra-parliamentary
2017	António Ximenes	1,764	0.31%	0 / 65	0	▲18th	Extra-parliamentary
2018 (Note: Run as part of the Social Democratic Movement coalition (CASDT, PSD, PST and PDC).)	António Ximenes	3,188	0.51%	0 / 65	0	▲8th	Extra-parliamentary
2023	António Ximenes	1,262	0.18%	0 / 65	0	▼13th	Extra-parliamentary
