= Maria do Céu =

Maria do Céu da Silva Lopes Federer
- Born: 1957 (age 68–69); Atauro Island, Portuguese Timor
- Known for: Presidential candidate in 2012
- Political party: independent

Maria do Céu da Silva Lopes Federer or Maria do Céu (born 1957) is an East Timor aid worker and politician who was a presidential candidate in the 2012 election.

== Life ==
Maria do Céu da Silva Lopes Federer was born on Atauro Island, in Portuguese Timor, in 1957. Her father was a journalist and lawyer who was at odds with the government. She was a linguist who can speak six languages. She too was a member of the resistance and she traveled between Australia and East Timor although it was in Australia that she brought up her family. She was one of the founders of the non-governmental organisation which they called Timor Aid.

In 2003 she gave evidence to a public hearing about the mistreatment of political prisoners in the early 1980s. She said that she saw old people, women and children arriving at the island of Atauro where she was working as an aid worker. These were people tricked into travelling there because they believed they were on a brief visit and they arrived with few possessions. Although the situation was generally more relaxed on the island some women were sexually abused and many children died in a cholera epidemic.

In the same year she led the Comissão Nacional de Eleições which organised elections.

She has been researching a book about the unknown activists of the East Timor. She stood as an independent in the 2012 presidential election and obtained 0.4% of the vote.
