= Jornal da República =

Journal of record of the East Timorese government

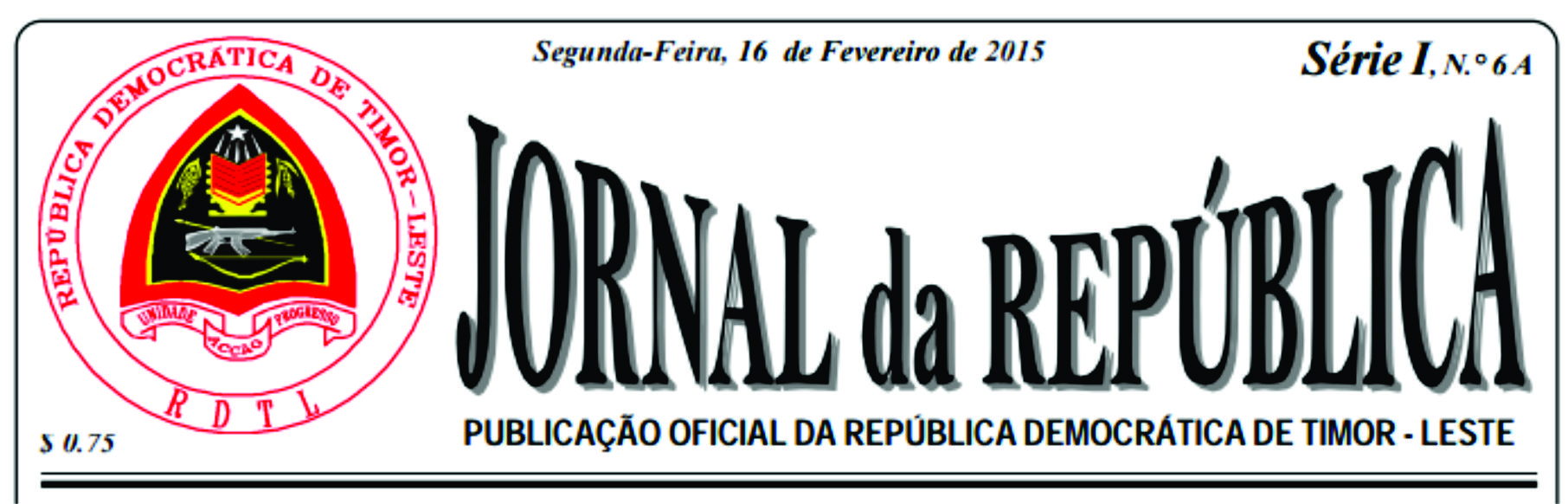
- Masthead
- Type: Government gazette
- Owner(s): Government of East Timor
- Founded: 20 May 2002; 23 years ago
- Language: Portuguese, Tetum
- City: Dili
- Country: East Timor
- OCLC number: 318389055
- Website: Jornal da República
- Free online archives: Archives home page

Jornal da República (transl. Journal of the Republic) is the government gazette of East Timor.

The Journal is published by the Ministry of Justice. It was first published on 20 May 2002, the day East Timor resumed its independence. The first issue promulgated the President's Decree appointing Mari Hamud Alkatiri as Prime Minister of East Timor.

By law, the contents of the Journal, once published in paper format, must be sent in electronic format to the Department of Technology and Information of the Ministry of Justice, which is responsible for publication of the Journal on its official website.

== See also ==
List of government gazettes
