= Municipal Market of Dili =

Historic market in Dili, Timor-Leste

Municipal Market of Dili; Dili Convention Centre
- Mercado Municipal de Díli; Centro de Convenções de Díli (CCD)
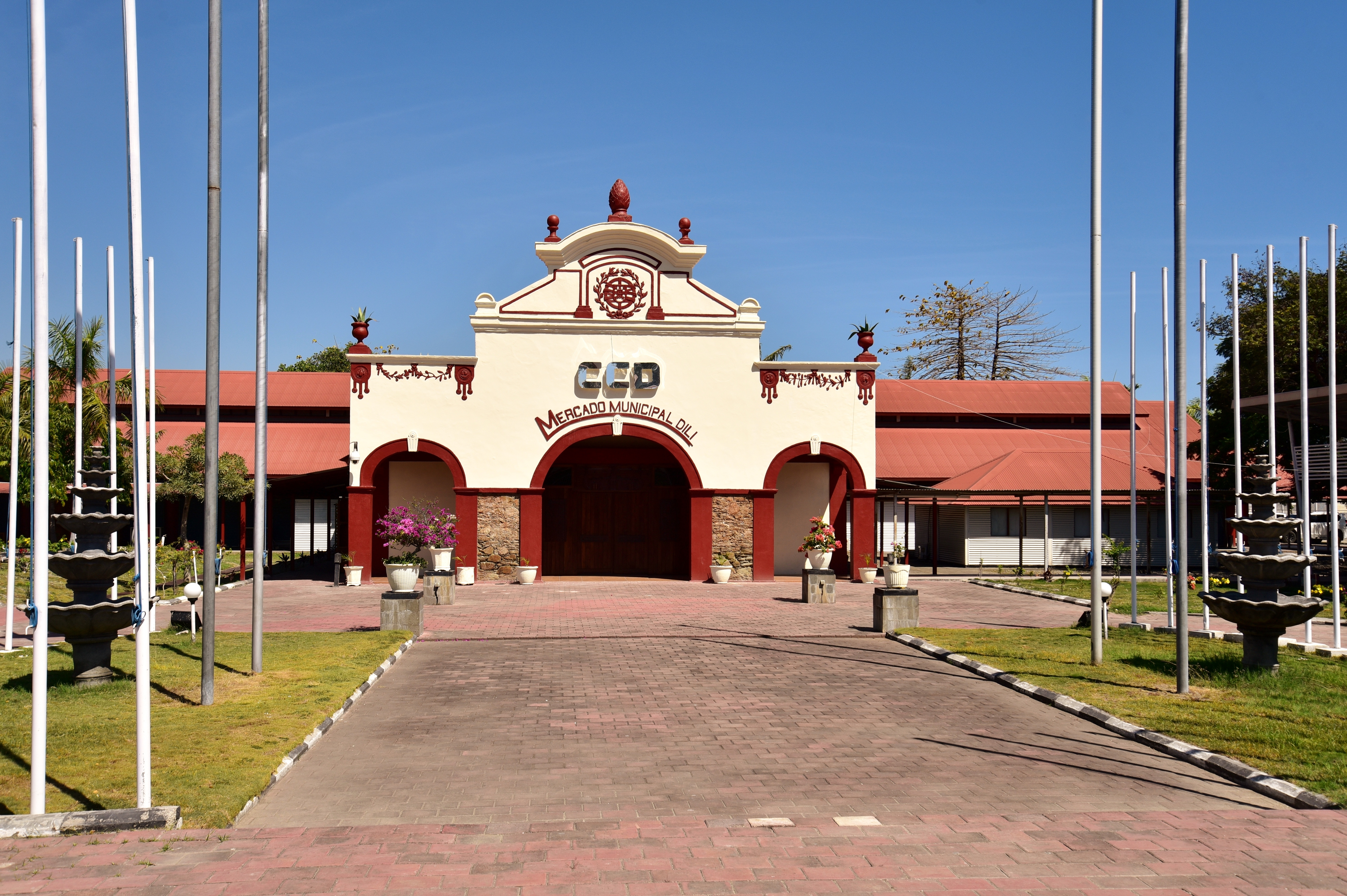
- The building in 2023
- Interactive map of the: Municipal Market of Dili; Dili Convention Centre; area

General information
- Type: Former public market; Convention centre
- Architectural style: Portuguese colonial
- Location: Dili, Timor-Leste
- Coordinates: 8°33′36″S 125°34′45″E
- Opened: 1960s
- Renovated: 2010

Technical details
- Floor count: 2

The old Municipal Market of Dili (Portuguese: Mercado Municipal de Díli), now the Dili Convention Centre (Portuguese: Centro de Convenções de Díli (CCD)), is a renovated and repurposed historic Portuguese colonial-style former public market building in Dili, the capital city of Timor-Leste.

== History ==
The building was the first of only three public marketplaces to be constructed in Dili prior to East Timorese independence in 2002. It was opened in the 1960s, and nearly all local products were traded inside it. Also inside the building was a yard with a small arena for cock fighting. Outside and surrounding the building, there was an extensive area used for outdoor markets, which were heavily patronised on Sundays by East Timorese from outside Dili.

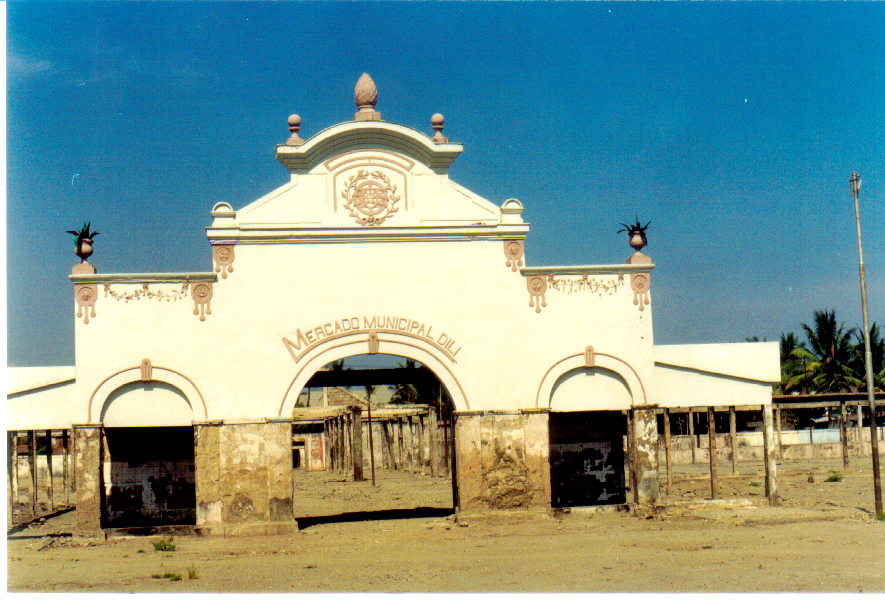
The building following its destruction in 1999

During the Indonesian invasion of East Timor at the end of 1975, the building was partially damaged. In the early stages of the ensuing Indonesian occupation, it was rehabilitated for public transactions. By the late 1980s or early 1990s, Dili had so many market vendors that the Indonesian provincial government established two additional marketplaces in Dili, one in Becora, and the other in Comoro. The vendors in the three markets were predominantly Indonesian traders from Sulawesi, Sumatra, Java, Bugis, Kupang and Lombok.

In 1999, after a majority of the East Timorese people had voted for independence from Indonesia, all three markets were burnt down by military-backed militia members. Local vendors continued to use the ruined original market to sell some daily basic needs, and in 2000, the United Nations Transitional Administration in East Timor (UNTAET), in collaboration with the World Bank, rehabilitated the Becora and Comoro facilities as official marketplaces.

The following year, 2001, UNTAET designated a new marketplace in Taibesi to replace the original marketplace. In 2010, the original marketplace was reopened as a convention centre.

== Architecture ==
The grounds of the former marketplace are approximately 1 ha (2.5 acres) in area. The building at their centre is two storeys high, and in the shape of a cross. The space surrounding the building is divided into four semi-patios, two sides of each of which run alongside the lateral façades of the building. In three cases, the other two sides of the semi-patio have a common border with a public urban space; the remaining semi-patio abuts a neighbouring barracks.

By these simple means, the structure as a whole provides for four distinct covered areas – the four arms of the building – each associated with an adjoining area for an open air market. At the intersection of the four arms was a central distribution area. The façades support a gable roof, topped with side-facing, gable-roofed skylights running the full length of the arms. Affixed to the exterior of the façades, and also running the full length of the arms, are narrow porches. The three sections of roofing – porch, pitch and skylight – are very simple, but create an ideal indoor atmosphere for an Asian market.

The main entrance, a central semi-circular portal, is at the end of the eastern arm of the building, and faces the widest part of the grounds. Surmounted by a triangular pediment and rounded top, along with two smaller side portals, it is crowned with the inscription "Mercado Municipal de Dili". Above the inscription, the armillary sphere and shield of the Portuguese coat of arms are engraved between the wall cornices and the rounded top.
