= Timor-Leste Supreme Court of Justice =

Independent judicial arm of the state of Timor-Leste

- Tribunal de Recurso de Timor-Leste
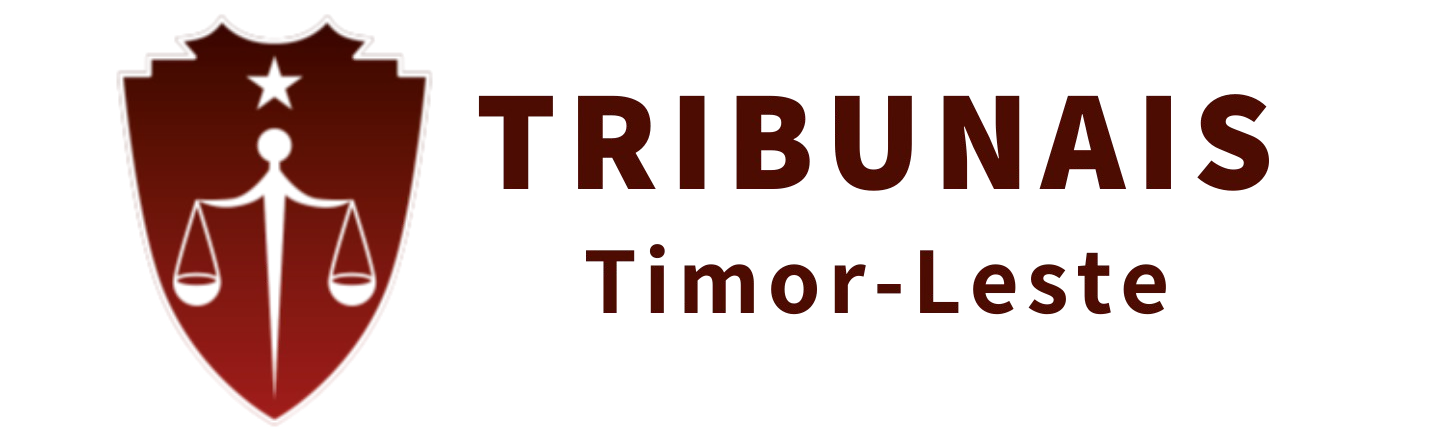
- Logo of the Supreme Court

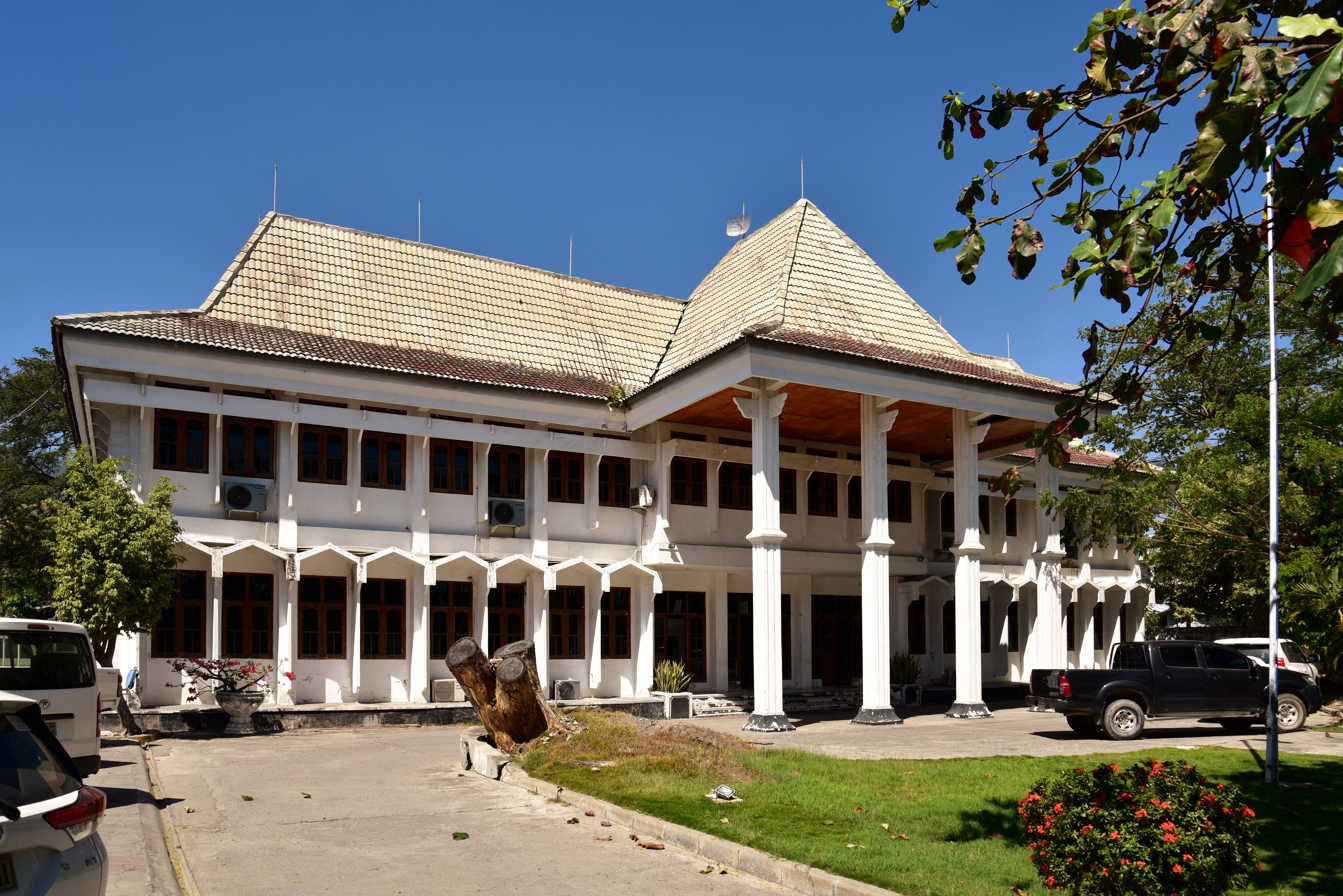
- The Court building in Caicoli, Dili
- Interactive map of Timor-Leste Supreme Court of Justice
- 8°33′36″S 125°34′38″E
- Established: 20 May 2002
- Jurisdiction: Timor-Leste
- Location: CHRG+2R9, R. Caicoli, Díli, Timor-Leste
- Coordinates: 8°33′36″S 125°34′38″E
- Composition method: Nominated by the Superior Council for Judicial Magistrates with National Parliament confirmation and Presidential appointment.
- Authorised by: East Timorese Constitution § 124
- Website: www.tribunais.tl

Court President
- Currently: Deolindo dos Santos
- Since: 28 April 2017

The Timor-Leste Supreme Court of Justice (Tetun: Tribunal de Recurso de Timor-Leste), also known as the Court of Appeal of Timor-Leste, is the highest court of Timor-Leste. It was established by the Constitution of Timor-Leste with ultimate jurisdiction over all legal, constitutional and electoral matters (§ 124 Art. 1 and 2 of the Constitution).

The seat of the court is in the Borohun district (Suco Caicoli) on Rua de Caicoli, west of the Municipal Market of Dili.

== History ==
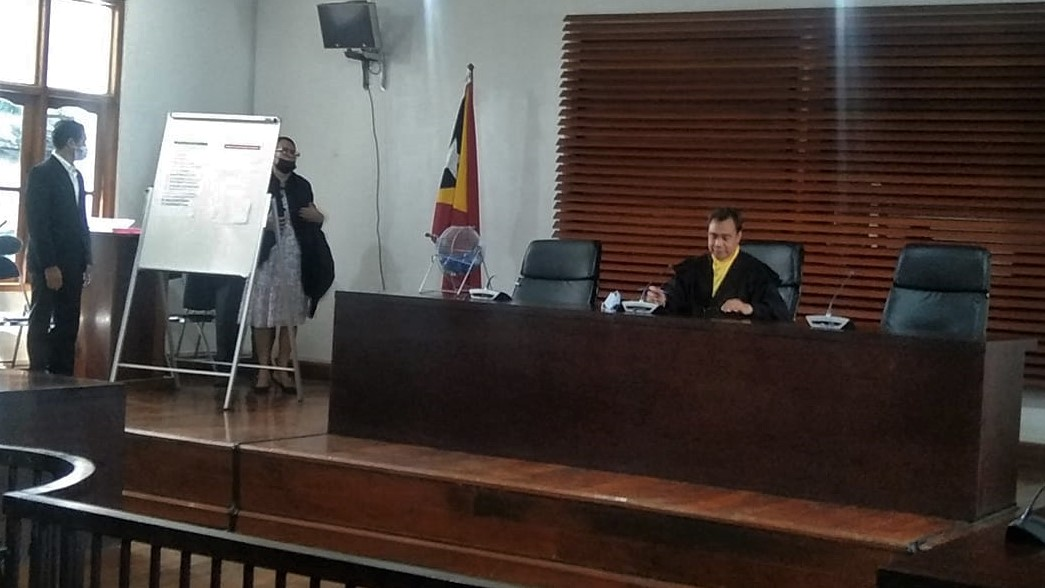
Deolindo dos Santos in the courtroom of the Tribunal

The United Nations Transitional Administration in East Timor (UNTAET) established a transitional judicial court service in 2000, consisting of a small number of Timorese judges, prosecutors, and public defenders. On 7 January 2000, the first group of judges took their seats.

With the restoration of Timor-Leste's independence on 20 May 2002, the Constitution became valid, which in section 124 calls for the creation of a Supreme Court. Its function and composition are regulated in section 125. Depending on the legal provisions, it can act as the first or second or only instance. It is composed of professional judges, magistrates of the ministry and jurists of merit. One judge is appointed by the National Parliament, the others by the Superior Council for Judicial Magistrates (Tetun: Conselho Superior da Magistratura Judicial). The president of the Court is appointed by the president of Timor-Leste from among the judges of the Court of Appeal.

Meanwhile, on 21 June 2007, Timor-Leste witnessed the swearing-in of the first group of twenty-seven national judges, prosecutors, and public defenders, graduates of the legal training center in Caicoli, as well as permanent agents of sovereign bodies and a special representative of the UN Secretary General. First, the Coordination Council oversaw the UNDP Justice Strengthening Programme's implementation, which trained public defenders and national judicial groups (which included the minister of justice, the president of the Court of Appeal and the public prosecutor-general). The programme had the support of the governments of Australia, Brazil, United States of America, Ireland, Norway, Portugal and Sweden.

Section 126 of the Constitution defines the competences of the court. It deals with all legal constitutional questions, checks for unconstitutional conduct by legal and administrative organs of the state and the constitutionality of ordinances, laws and referendums. Likewise, the court examines for unconstitutionality by omission or the unconstitutional rulings of lower instances.

In addition, there is the constitutional and legal examination of the legality of the formation, registration or dissolution of political parties and their coalitions. In presidential elections, the Supreme Court examines the legal requirements for candidates and, in all elections, the conformity of the actions in the electoral process with the valid law. Finally, the court examines the election results and officially announces them.

== Court composition ==
Article 125 of the Constitution states that the Supreme Court shall consist of career judges or magistrates of the Public Prosecution or jurists of recognised merit. The number of members is determined by law. There shall be one judge elected by the National Parliament, and the others shall be appointed by the Higher Council of the Judiciary. All judges must be Timorese.

=== Presidents ===
The term of office of the president of the court is four years and can be extended.

President of the Timor-Leste Supreme Court of Justice
Name	Picture	Term of office	Notes
Cláudio de Jesus Ximenes		2003–2014	Twice confirmed in office, early resignation
Guilhermino da Silva		2014–2017	Resigned in 2017 for health reasons.
Maria Natércia Gusmão Pereira		interim 2007–2009, 2015/16, 2017	
Deolindo dos Santos		Since 28 April 2017	

=== Other judges ===
- Maria Natércia Gusmão Pereira
- Jacinta Correia da Costa, Since 2003
- Duarte Tilman Soares
- António José Fonseca de Jesus

=== Former judges ===
To support the development of Timor-Leste's judicial system, judges from other countries were also appointed until 2014.

- Cláudio de Jesus Ximenes (2003–2014)
- Guilhermino da Silva (2014–2017)
- Frederick Egonda-Ntende (from Uganda)
- José Luís da Góia (from Portugal)
- Cid Orlando Geraldo (from Portugal)
- José Maria Calvário Antunes (from Portugal), June 2003 – ?
