= Elections in Timor-Leste =

Timor-Leste (formerly East Timor) elects on national level a head of state, the president, and a legislature. The president is elected for a five-year term by the people. The National Parliament (Portuguese: Parlamenta Nacional) has 65 members.

== Schedule ==
Position	2012	2013 - 2016	2017	2022
Type	Presidential (March & April); National Parliament (July)	None	Presidential (March & April); National Parliament (July)	Presidential (March & April)
President	President	None	President	
National Assembly	All seats	None	All seats	
Provinces, cities and municipalities	All seats	None	All seats	

== Latest elections ==
=== Presidential elections ===
Candidate	Party	First round		Second round	
Candidate	Party	Votes	%	Votes	%
José Ramos-Horta	National Congress for Timorese Reconstruction	303,477	46.56	398,028	62.10
Francisco Guterres	Fretilin	144,282	22.13	242,939	37.90
Armanda Berta dos Santos	Kmanek Haburas Unidade Nasional Timor Oan	56,690	8.70		
Lere Anan Timur	Independent	49,314	7.57		
Mariano Sabino Lopes	Democratic Party	47,334	7.26		
Anacleto Bento Ferreira	Democratic Republic of Timor-Leste Party	13,205	2.03		
Martinho Germano da Silva Gusmão	United Party for Development and Democracy	8,598	1.32		
Hermes da Rosa Correia Barros	Independent	8,030	1.23		
Milena Pires	Independent	5,430	0.83		
Isabel da Costa Ferreira	Independent	4,219	0.65		
Felizberto Araújo Duarte	Independent	2,709	0.42		
Constâncio da Conceção Pinto	Independent	2,520	0.39		
Rogerio Lobato	Independent	2,058	0.32		
Virgílio da Silva Guterres	Independent	1,720	0.26		
Antero Benedito Silva	Independent	1,562	0.24		
Ángela Freitas	Independent	711	0.11		
Total		651,859	100.00	640,967	100.00
Valid votes		651,859	98.16	640,967	99.16
Invalid/blank votes		12,247	1.84	5,422	0.84
Total votes		664,106	100.00	646,389	100.00
Registered voters/turnout		859,613	77.26	859,925	75.17
Source: National Election Commission

=== Parliamentary elections ===
Party	Votes	%	Seats	+/–
Alliance for Change and Progress (CNRT–PLP–KHUNTO)	309,663	49.58	34	–1
Fretilin	213,324	34.16	23	0
Democratic Party	50,370	8.07	5	–2
Democratic Development Forum (PUDD–UDT–FM–PDN)	34,301	5.49	3	+3
Hope of the Fatherland Party	5,060	0.81	0	0
National Development Movement (APMT–PLPA–MLPM–UNDERTIM)	4,494	0.72	0	0
Republican Party	4,125	0.66	0	0
Social Democratic Movement (CASDT–PSD–PST–PDC)	3,188	0.51	0	0
Total	624,525	100.00	65	0
Valid votes	624,525	98.33		
Invalid/blank votes	10,591	1.67		
Total votes	635,116	100.00		
Registered voters/turnout	784,286	80.98		
Source: CNE

== Past elections ==
=== Presidential elections ===
Candidate	Party	First round		Second round	
Candidate	Party	Votes	%	Votes	%
Francisco Guterres	Fretilin	133,635	28.76	174,408	38.77
Taur Matan Ruak	Independent	119,462	25.71	275,471	61.23
José Ramos-Horta	Independent	81,231	17.48		
Fernando de Araújo	Democratic Party	80,381	17.30		
Rogério Lobato	Independent	16,219	3.49		
José Luís Guterres	Frenti-Mudança	9,235	1.99		
Manuel Tilman	Association of Timorese Heroes	7,226	1.56		
Abílio Araújo	Timorese Nationalist Party	6,294	1.35		
Lucas da Costa	Independent	3,862	0.83		
Francisco Gomes	People's Freedom Party of the Aileba	3,531	0.76		
Maria do Céu	Independent	1,843	0.40		
Angelita Pires	Independent	1,742	0.37		
Total		464,661	100.00	449,879	100.00
Valid votes		464,661	94.84	449,879	98.08
Invalid/blank votes		25,272	5.16	8,824	1.92
Total votes		489,933	100.00	458,703	100.00
Registered voters/turnout		627,295	78.10	627,295	73.12
Source: IFES, IFES

Candidate	Party	First round		Second round	
Candidate	Party	Votes	%	Votes	%
Francisco Guterres	Fretilin	112,666	27.89	127,342	30.82
José Ramos-Horta	Independent	88,102	21.81	285,835	69.18
Fernando de Araújo	Democratic Party	77,459	19.18		
Francisco Xavier do Amaral	Timorese Social Democratic Association	58,125	14.39		
Lúcia Lobato	Social Democratic Party	35,789	8.86		
Manuel Tilman	Association of Timorese Heroes	16,534	4.09		
Avelino Coelho da Silva	Socialist Party of Timor	8,338	2.06		
João Viegas Carrascalão	Timorese Democratic Union	6,928	1.72		
Total		403,941	100.00	413,177	100.00
Valid votes		403,941	94.56	413,177	97.34
Invalid/blank votes		23,257	5.44	11,298	2.66
Total votes		427,198	100.00	424,475	100.00
Registered voters/turnout		522,933	81.69	524,073	81.00
Source: ANFREL, IFES

Candidate	Party	Votes	%
Xanana Gusmão	Independent	301,634	82.69
Francisco Xavier do Amaral	Timorese Social Democratic Association	63,146	17.31
Total		364,780	100.00
Valid votes		364,780	96.36
Invalid/blank votes		13,768	3.64
Total votes		378,548	100.00
Registered voters/turnout		446,256	84.83
Source: IFES

=== Parliamentary elections ===
Party	Votes	%	Seats	+/–
Fretilin	168,480	29.66	23	–2
National Congress for Timorese Reconstruction	167,345	29.46	22	–8
People's Liberation Party	60,098	10.58	8	New
Democratic Party	55,608	9.79	7	–1
Kmanek Haburas Unidade Nasional Timor Oan	36,547	6.43	5	+5
United Party for Development and Democracy	15,887	2.80	0	New
Timorese Democratic Union	11,255	1.98	0	0
Frenti-Mudança	8,849	1.56	0	–2
Hope of the Fatherland Party	6,775	1.19	0	New
Timorese Monarchist People's Association	5,461	0.96	0	0
Bloku Unidade Popular (PMD–PLPA–PDRT)	4,999	0.88	0	0
Socialist Party of Timor	4,891	0.86	0	0
Social Democratic Party	4,688	0.83	0	0
Republican Party	3,951	0.70	0	0
National Development Party	3,846	0.68	0	0
Timorese Social Democratic Action Center	2,330	0.41	0	New
People's Development Party	2,079	0.37	0	0
Christian Democratic Party	1,764	0.31	0	0
Maubere People's Liberation Movement	1,332	0.23	0	New
National Unity of Timorese Resistance	1,216	0.21	0	0
Timorese Democratic Party	669	0.12	0	0
Total	568,070	100.00	65	0
Valid votes	568,070	97.28		
Invalid/blank votes	15,886	2.72		
Total votes	583,956	100.00		
Registered voters/turnout	760,907	76.74		
Source: CNE

Party	Votes	%	Seats	+/–
National Congress for Timorese Reconstruction	172,831	36.66	30	+12
Fretilin	140,786	29.87	25	+4
Democratic Party	48,581	10.31	8	0
Frenti-Mudança	14,648	3.11	2	New
Kmanek Haburas Unidade Nasional Timor Oan	13,998	2.97	0	New
Socialist Party of Timor	11,379	2.41	0	0
Social Democratic Party	10,158	2.15	0	–
National Development Party	9,386	1.99	0	New
Timorese Social Democratic Association	8,487	1.80	0	–
National Unity of Timorese Resistance	7,041	1.49	0	–2
Timorese Democratic Union	5,332	1.13	0	0
Republican Party	4,270	0.91	0	0
PLPA–PDRT coalition	4,012	0.85	0	0
Timorese Monarchist People's Association	3,968	0.84	0	New
National Unity Party	3,191	0.68	0	–3
Coligação Bloco Proclamador (PMD–PARENTIL)	3,125	0.66	0	0
Democratic Alliance (KOTA–PTT)	2,622	0.56	0	–2
Timorese Democratic Party	2,561	0.54	0	0
Liberal Party	2,222	0.47	0	New
People's Development Party	1,904	0.40	0	New
Christian Democratic Party	887	0.19	0	0
Total	471,389	100.00	65	0
Valid votes	471,389	97.64		
Invalid/blank votes	11,403	2.36		
Total votes	482,792	100.00		
Registered voters/turnout	645,624	74.78		
Source: STAE, SAPO

Party	Votes	%	Seats	+/–
Fretilin	120,592	29.02	21	–34
National Congress for Timorese Reconstruction	100,175	24.10	18	New
PSD–ASDT	65,358	15.73	11	–1
Democratic Party	46,946	11.30	8	+1
National Unity Party	18,896	4.55	3	New
Democratic Alliance (KOTA–PPT)	13,294	3.20	2	–2
National Unity of Timorese Resistance	13,247	3.19	2	New
Timorese Nationalist Party	10,057	2.42	0	–2
Democratic Republic of Timor-Leste Party	7,718	1.86	0	New
Republican Party	4,408	1.06	0	New
Christian Democratic Party	4,300	1.03	0	–2
Socialist Party of Timor	3,982	0.96	0	–1
Timorese Democratic Union	3,753	0.90	0	–2
Millennium Democratic Party	2,878	0.69	0	New
Total	415,604	100.00	65	–23
Valid votes	415,604	97.51		
Invalid/blank votes	10,606	2.49		
Total votes	426,210	100.00		
Registered voters/turnout	529,198	80.54		
Source: CNE

Party	Votes	%	Seats
Fretilin	208,531	57.37	55
Democratic Party	31,680	8.72	7
Social Democratic Party	29,726	8.18	6
Timorese Social Democratic Association	28,495	7.84	6
Timorese Democratic Union	8,581	2.36	2
Timorese Nationalist Party	8,035	2.21	2
Association of Timorese Heroes	7,735	2.13	2
People's Party of Timor	7,322	2.01	2
Christian Democratic Party	7,181	1.98	2
Socialist Party of Timor	6,483	1.78	1
Liberal Party	4,013	1.10	1
Christian Democratic Union of Timor	2,413	0.66	1
Timorese Popular Democratic Association	2,181	0.60	0
Timorese Labor Party	2,026	0.56	0
National Republic Party of East Timor	1,970	0.54	0
Maubere Democratic Party	1,788	0.49	0
Independents	5,341	1.47	1
Total	363,501	100.00	88
Valid votes	363,501	94.60	
Invalid/blank votes	20,747	5.40	
Total votes	384,248	100.00	
Registered voters/turnout	446,666	86.03	
Source: Ying, Elections Today, IDEA

== See also ==
- Electoral calendar
- Electoral system
