= 2012 East Timorese parliamentary election =

- 7 July 2012
- All 65 seats in the National Parliament; 33 seats needed for a majority
- Turnout: 74.78% (▼5.76pp)
Party	Leader	Vote %	Seats	+/–
CNRT	Xanana Gusmão	36.66	30	+12
Fretilin	Mari Alkatiri	29.87	25	+4
Democratic	Fernando de Araújo	10.31	8	0
Frenti-Mudança	José Luís Guterres	3.11	2	New
This lists parties that won seats. See the complete results below.
Most voted-for party by district
Prime Minister before	Prime Minister-designate
Xanana Gusmão; CNRT	Xanana Gusmão; CNRT

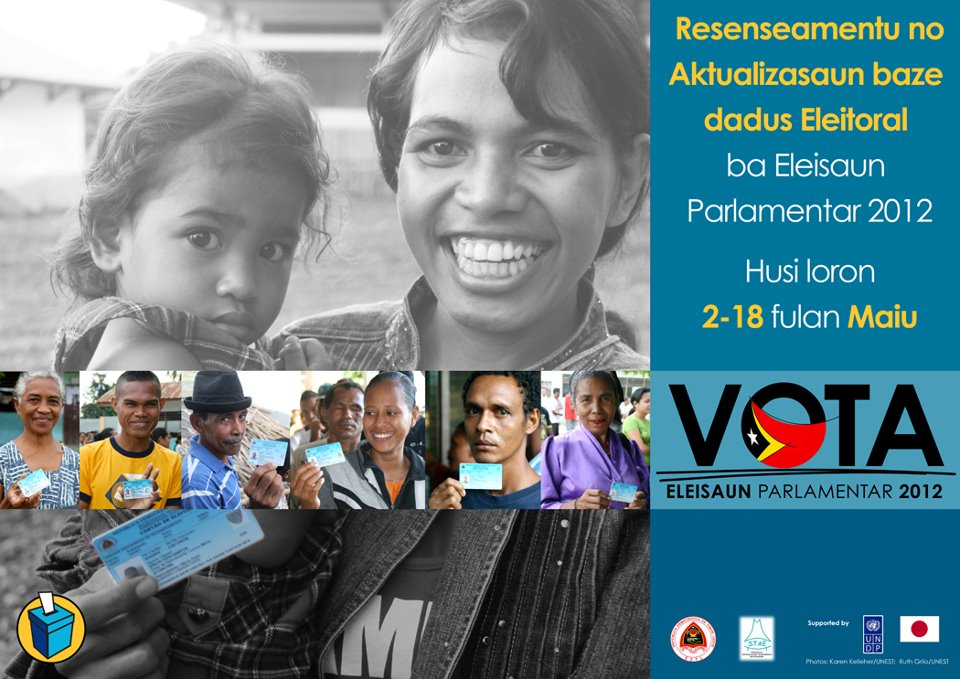
Voter Information on Registration and update of the electoral database

Parliamentary elections were held in Timor-Leste on 7 July 2012. The United Nations stated that it would withdraw its 1,300 troops if the elections passed off peacefully. The National Congress for Timorese Reconstruction, led by Prime Minister Xanana Gusmão, won the election with 30 seats, three seats short of a majority in National Parliament.

== Background ==
After the severe unrest of 2006, the Australian-led International Stabilisation Force (ISF) and the United Nations Integrated Mission in Timor-Leste (UNMIT) had restored peace and order in the country. An assassination attempt on February 11, 2008, against President José Ramos-Horta and Prime Minister Xanana Gusmão resulted in the death of rebel leader Alfredo Reinado. The rebel movement subsequently collapsed. Those of its members who had been convicted of involvement in the assassination were pardoned by President Ramos-Horta in 2010. In March 2011, the Timor-Leste National Police (PNTL) resumed full responsibility for security in the country. ISF and UNMIT plan to leave in 2012 after presidential and parliamentary elections have been held.

The country had largely stabilized, but there were sporadic clashes between various martial arts groups and youth gangs, during which houses were also burned down, most recently in Comoro and in 2011 in Zumalai and Luro. In addition, the veterans' organization CPD-RDTL caused unrest through ongoing protests. The local elections on October 9, 2009, passed off without major incidents.

Fretilin, the country's largest party, was in opposition to the five-party government coalition Aliança da Maioria Parlamentar (AMP), which included the National Congress for Timorese Reconstruction (CNRT), Democratic Party (PD), Timorese Social Democratic Association (ASDT), Social Democratic Party (PSD) and UNDERTIM. Because Fretilin, the largest parliamentary group, did not participate in the government, it accused the government of unconstitutionality throughout the legislative period. In addition, several members of the government were suspected of corruption, but this could not be confirmed in any case. On June 8, however, Justice Minister Lúcia Lobato (PSD) was sentenced to five years in prison for mismanagement of funds.

Several parties had to cope with splits and internal factional struggles. The reform wing of Fretilin, led by Deputy Prime Minister José Luís Guterres, split off as Frenti-Mudança. There were internal power struggles in KOTA, UNDERTIM was internally divided, and a deputy from the National Unity Party (PUN) resigned and now sat in Parliament as an independent deputy. The ASDT deputies fell out with their base. While the party signed a declaration of alliance with Fretilin, ASDT parliamentarians threatened that they would continue to work with Prime Minister Gusmão if the party left the governing coalition. The previous ASDT president Francisco Xavier do Amaral had health problems and saw his office threatened by Tourism Minister Gil da Costa Alves, who was elected executive president in August 2011. However, his election was reversed by Timor-Leste's Supreme Court. On March 5, 2012, Amaral succumbed to cancer in Dili. The dispute continued to simmer between the faction around Alves, who is close to the coalition partner CNRT, and the former Amaral supporters around João Correia, whose faction supported José Ramos-Horta in the March 17, 2012 presidential election and wants to make him honorary chairman of the ASDT.

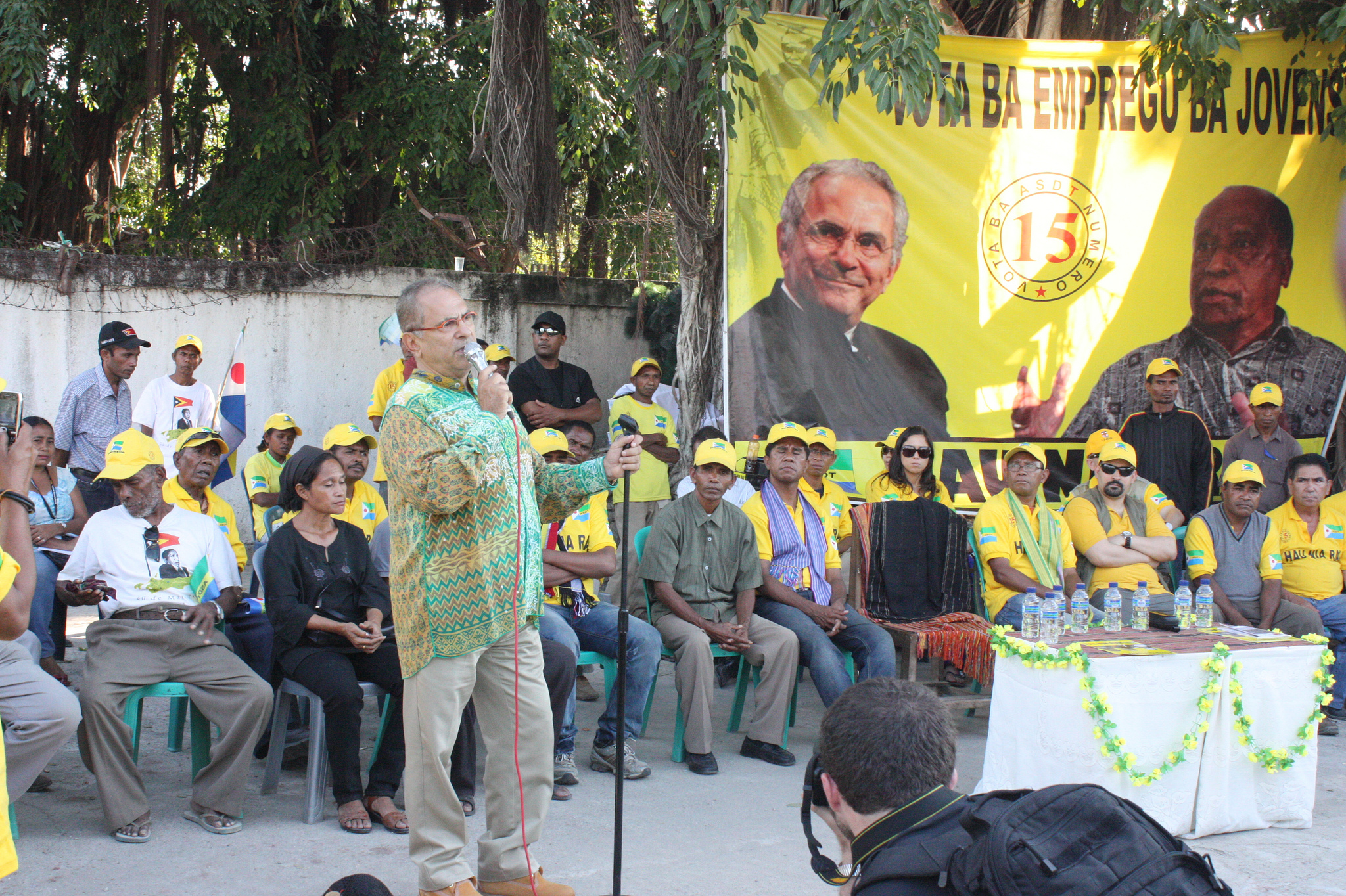
Ramos-Horta at an ASDT campaign event

There was a dispute in the PD over the formation of the government. MPs from the western part of the country (Loro Munu) felt that regional proportional representation was not guaranteed and that PD politicians from the east (Loro Sae) were favoured in the formation of the cabinet. The dispute was settled with the appointment of Adriano do Nascimento as Minister of Agriculture, Forestry and Fisheries. In exchange, the western-born PD MP Lucas da Costa stood in the 2012 presidential elections, in which his eastern-born party leader Fernando de Araújo also contested. Araújo eventually came fourth with 17.30%, while Costa received only 0.83% of the vote. Both were thus eliminated in the first round of the presidential elections, as was the incumbent President Ramos-Horta with 17.48%. After the presidential election, Ramos-Horta, who, unlike the previous time, had not received the support of the CNRT in the elections, announced that he would work with the PD in the parliamentary elections. Later, he also pledged his support to the ASDT. If the votes of La Sama and Ramos-Horta in the presidential elections were added together, one could expect a 35% share of the vote in the general elections for the PD, which would make it the strongest force in the new parliament, ahead of Fretilin and CNRT. However, this was not certain, as La Sama had also received more votes in the last elections than his party would later. It was also unclear whether the PD would again form a coalition with the CNRT or, in contrast to its previous negative stance, with Fretilin. In the case of a coalition government with PD participation, there was speculation about a Prime Minister position for Ramos-Horta. However, Ramos-Horta ruled out taking up any political office at the end of the election campaign. His political career was over, he declared.

According to the Constitution of Timor-Leste, even if coalition negotiations failed, a minority government under the strongest party would be possible if the president entrusted it with forming a government. But experts warn that in this case critics of the parliamentary system could intervene in the military.

Xanana Gusmão and leading members of the PSD have been at loggerheads in recent years, with party leader Zacarias da Costa even threatening to resign as foreign minister by text message in 2010. Gusmão, for his part, insulted the Foreign Minister at a televised meeting of the Council of Ministers, exposing him. Analysts could therefore also imagine an alliance between the PSD and Fretilin after the election. Frenti-Mudança was expected to form a coalition with the CNRT if necessary. Another potential coalition partner of the CNRT could be the new National Development Party (PDN), whose party leader Fernando Dias Gusmão comes from the PSD. The former PSD secretary-general had lost the 2008 election to party leader Zacarias da Costa and subsequently founded the PDN.

== Electoral system ==
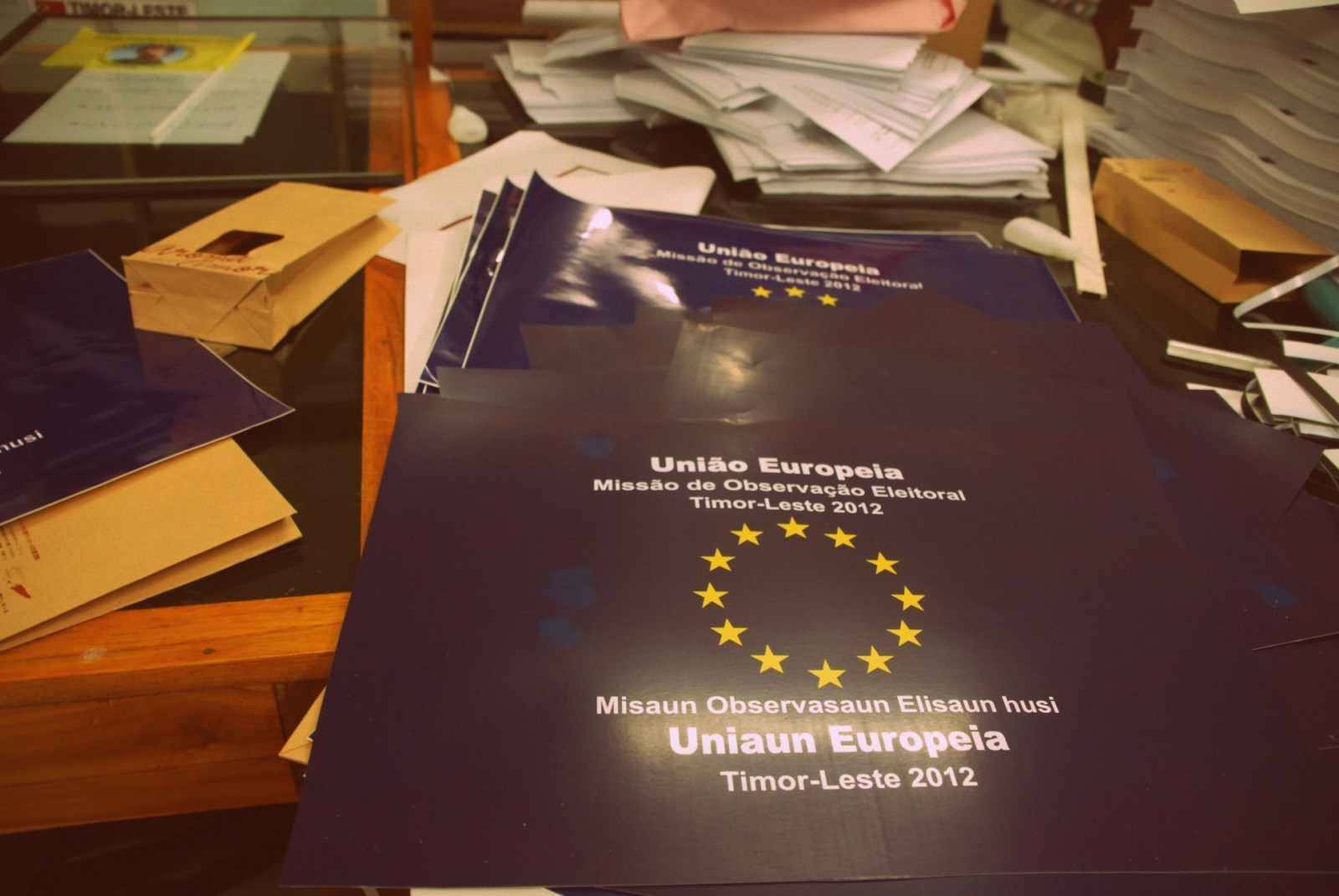
EU Election Observation Mission to Timor-Leste 2012

Each of the 645,624 eligible voters has one vote, which they can give to a party list. People are eligible to vote from the age of 17. Several parties can also run as a coalition with a joint list. A three-percent hurdle applies, which would mean about 18,000 votes in a 100% turnout. The election is held with closed lists. According to the share of the total votes, parties and coalitions receive seats in parliament, which are filled according to the order on the electoral list. Only registered parties and electoral alliances may draw up lists of candidates, but persons on the list need not belong to the party, which meant that independent candidates could also enter parliament. A total of 90 people must be on a party list, and the final 25 candidates are replacements for any retiring deputies.

Registered parties receive state financial support from the National Electoral Commission (CNE) based on the proportion of seats won by the party in the national parliament. In 2011, for the first time, the total amount of funding for all parties in parliament was three million U.S. dollars, up from one million U.S. dollars annually. Parties that are not represented in parliament but are registered for the 2012 parliamentary elections will receive $30,000 from the CNE, and party coalitions will receive $45,000.

All 65 members of the National Parliament were elected from a single nationwide constituency by party-list proportional representation voting. A party had to cross the electoral threshold of 3% to enter parliament and seats were distributed according to the d'Hondt method. Parties were required to submit lists with 65 candidates and at least 25 replacements. According to the electoral law, every fourth member on a party's list has to be a woman.

The ballots were printed in Kupang, Indonesia, in West Timor and brought to Timor-Leste by land. The reception at the border was greatly celebrated. Voting took place in 880 polling stations and 640 polling centers. The polling stations were open between 7 a.m. and 3 p.m.

The European Union sent 70 election observers and analysts to Timor-Leste. Five parliamentarians are coming from New Zealand as observers. These include representatives from other countries and many non-governmental organizations. A total of 586 foreign and 2,618 national election observers were registered. In addition, there were 106 foreign and 112 local journalists.

== Parties and candidates ==
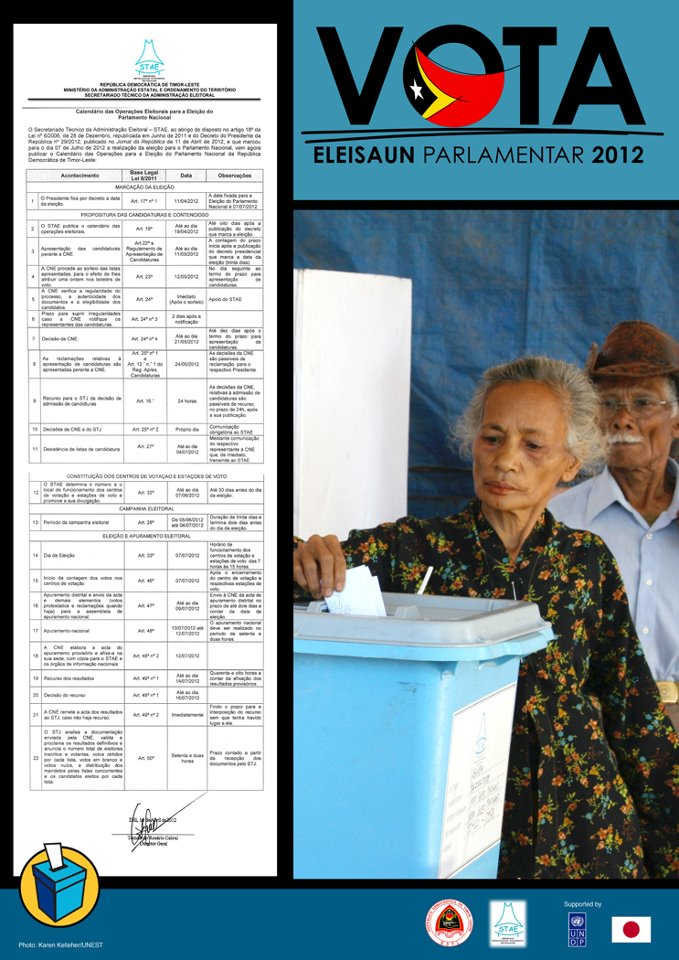
A 2012 Voter information poster

On 12 May, the CNE drew lots for the order of parties and candidate lists on the ballot paper. The nationalist, pro-Indonesian Timorese Nationalist Party (PNT) and the traditional monarchist People's Party of Timor (PPT) did not submit their lists of candidates to the authorities by the deadline on 11 May and were therefore not admitted to the election. Even the major parties Fretilin, CNRT and PD and five other parties submitted their list only on the last day. The PSD placed Lúcia Lobato second on its list before her conviction, which brought the party public criticism from its former leader Mário Viegas Carrascalão. The latter did not stand for re-election due to his state of health.

The internal division of the ASDT led to the party even submitting two electoral lists to the CNE. One by Tourism Minister Alves and one by João Correia. The Timor-Leste Supreme Court of Justice, Timor-Leste's Court of Appeal, ruled that only Correira's list met the required regularity of clearance by a party congress. As a result, none of the previous ASDT MP's and government members are on the list.

The dispute was more complicated in the UNDERTIM, from which two electoral lists were also submitted by different party wings. The CNE again set an ultimatum, but the groups around party leader Cornelio Gama and General Secretary Reis Kadalak could not agree on a common list, which led to the exclusion of UNDERTIM from the elections on 1 June. However, this was again withdrawn by the Court of Appeal on 4 June after the two UNDERTIM wings were able to agree on a common list. A prominent UNDERTIM candidate is Angelita Pires, former presidential candidate and lover of the dead rebel leader Alfredo Reinado.

In the last election in 2007, seven parties failed to clear the three-percent hurdle. Six of them joined forces after the election to form the Progressive Democratic League (LDP) for better visibility. The result of this cooperation, however, was hardly registerable. This time, too, it was expected that the numerous newly formed parties would mostly not win a seat in parliament. The best chances were still given to Frenti-Mudança, PDN and the Kmanek Haburas Unidade Nasional Timor Oan (KHUNTO). KHUNTO had close ties to a martial arts group and its stronghold in Ainaro.

Despite the lack of polls, analysts assumed that either Fretilin or CNRT would lead a coalition government after the election, even though both parties had set themselves the goal of an absolute majority. The PD or PSD were expected to provide the majority, but they had lost considerable strength since the last elections.

== Campaign ==
In total, 21 political parties registered for the election. The campaign was focused on economic issues, particularly the country's $10.5 billion oil fund. Alongside the two main parties, CNRT and Fretilin, a further 19 parties and lists registered for the elections.

The election campaign was focused on economic issues, particularly the question of what should be done with the country's oil fund, worth $10.5 billion. Other focuses in the election campaign were the fight against corruption, the development of infrastructure and ensuring peace and stability in the country. The CNRT campaign pledged to increase the amount of money the fund contributed to the state budget beyond the existing 3% limit and to attract foreign loans for infrastructure improvement projects, promising long-term investment in roads and electricity and water supplies. Fretilin opposed CNRT's policies on foreign loans and changes to the oil fund spending, but ran a campaign focused on raising levels of income and education. FRETILIN general secretary Mari Alkatiri promised to reduce corruption if elected.

In the election campaign, Fretilin promised at least 150 hours of paid work on government projects for every unemployed Timorese annually (unemployment is between 50 and 60%) and financial support for women in training. The PD, given its mainly young constituency, promised scholarships for students, while the CNRT relied on its charismatic leader Gusmão and his merits in the freedom struggle and in his last years as prime minister. Besides, they pointed to the government's existing development plans.

Frenti-Mudança did not organise large events. Instead, they paid 100 to 200 US dollars to small groups who would then advertise the party in their hometowns. In this way, the relatively small party was able to reach even remote regions of the country.

== Conduct ==
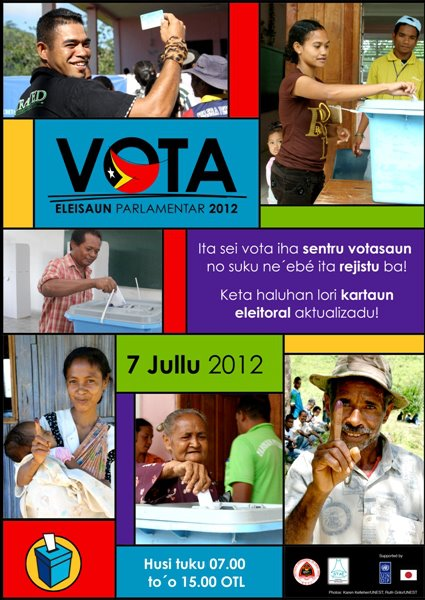
STAE election call

In June 2011, CNRT supporters burned Fretilin flags. The party leaders therefore met immediately and the CNRT party leadership condemned the provocations. In general, the leaders of both parties are trying not to escalate the mood in the country. For example, Fretilin leader Francisco Lu-Olo Guterres visited the CNRT party congress and demonstratively embraced Xanana Gusmão. They wished each other all the best.

The following 12 May, UNDERTIM politician Reis Kadalak threatened to burn down the CNE's office after a CNE training session. He accused the CNE of manipulating the budget allocated to the parties for the election campaign.

On 18 May, the Global Organisation of Parliamentarians against Corruption (GOPAC) made allegations against the CNRT's campaign financing. Companies that had paid several hundred thousand US dollars to the party were said to have received lucrative contracts from the government. Party leader and Prime Minister Gusmão rejected the accusations. He said that it was normal party financing, as it is handled worldwide. Moreover, they have only received pledges of donations so far, but not money. If the donations come in the name of companies and not from individuals, they will not be accepted according to the law. The allegations are also controversial because they were made by Fernanda Borges, the PUN party leader, and are seen as electioneering. The public prosecutor's office and the Anti-Corruption Commission (CAC) are investigating the circumstances.

According to the electoral law, official campaigning began on 5 June and ran until 4 July. The government gave 6 July, the day before election day, off to state employees. Administration, offices and public schools remain closed. This is to allow employees and civil servants to travel to their home towns to cast their votes.

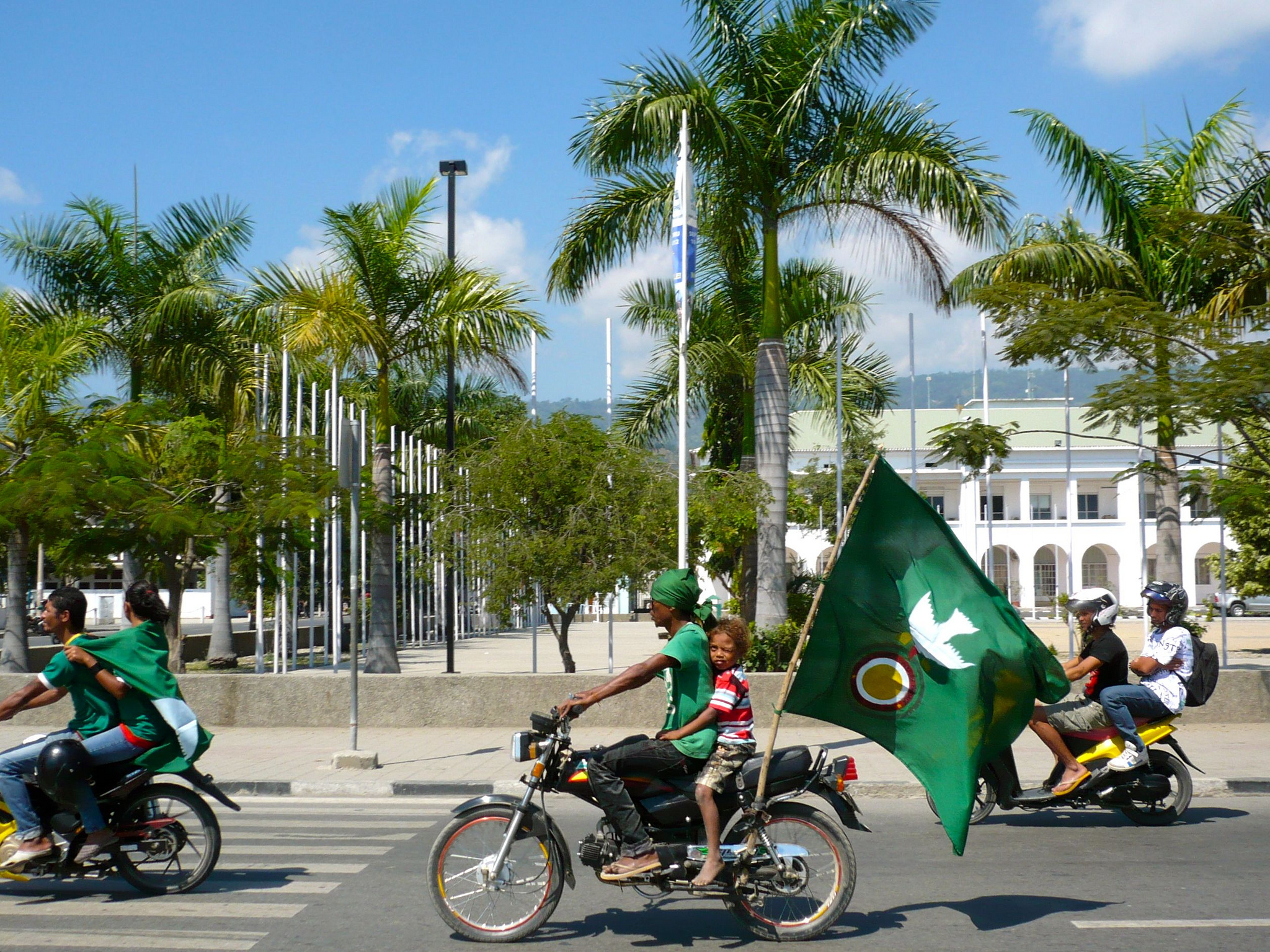
Child on a moped at a KHUNTO event in Dili

The election campaign period was largely peaceful. On 23 June, two men were arrested by the police for throwing stones at cars belonging to a Fretilin campaign group. According to police, the perpetrators were not supporters of another party, but members of a group known for causing trouble. As of 3 July, only 14 written complaints about violations during the election campaign had been filed with the CNE, mostly involving the destruction of campaign material such as party flags. Three complaints were forwarded to law enforcement agencies. The most serious incident was an arson attack on the CNRT office in Ossu (Viqueque municipality). On several occasions, the CNE criticised the unauthorised use of children at election campaign events. Shortly before the end of the regular election campaign, PD party leader Fernando de Aráujo warned at a campaign appearance in Baucau that some of the major parties might try to buy votes for 20 to 50 US dollars. PUN leader Fernanda Borges also accused the big parties of buying many votes in the countryside. The CNRT in particular had thrown a lot of money around, the origin of which was not clear. The head of the EU observer mission Nuno Melo also reported cases of vote buying.

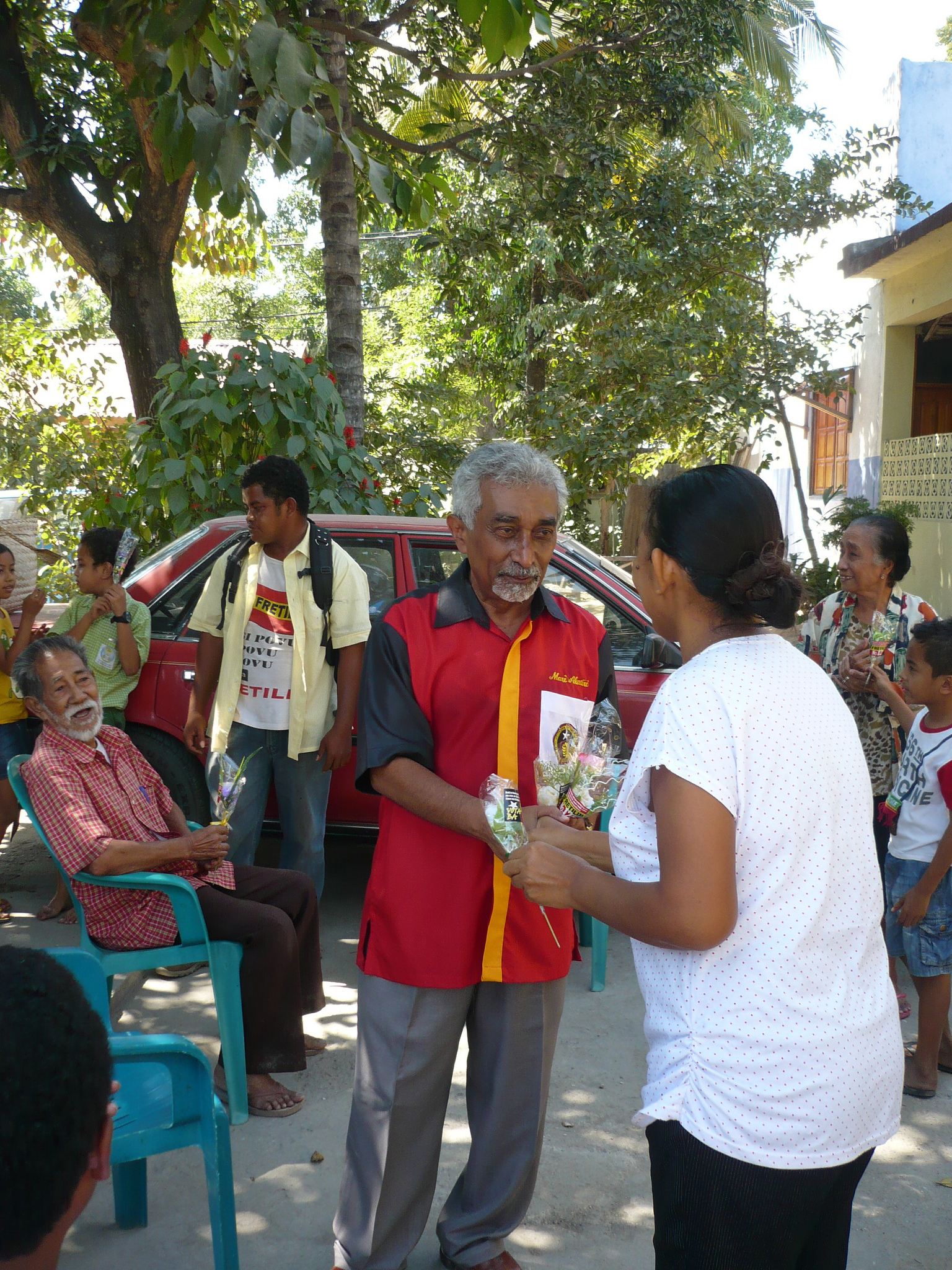
Fretilin Secretary General Marí Alkatiri distributing flowers on 4 July

Fretilin announced that instead of holding a demonstration march as a final event in Dili, they would distribute flowers to the people on the last day of the election campaign as a sign of peace.

The Australia Timor-Leste Friendship Network confirmed free and fair elections in Timor-Leste. There were only minor technical problems. The American International Republican Institute also attested to a peaceful election in Timor-Leste, which remained without major incidents and generally met international standards. Only minor irregularities were registered, but these are said to have had no effect on the election results. For example, not every polling station was checked before casting the ballot to ensure that the voter did not already have an ink-stained finger, which would indicate that the vote had already been cast. In some polling stations, there were irritations regarding the positioning of voting booths, and election observers sporadically registered voters who had not yet reached the minimum age of 17. UN Secretary-General Ban Ki-moon also congratulated Timor-Leste for the peaceful conduct of the elections. Praise also came from the European Union and the Community of Portuguese Language Countries. The Friendship Observer Mission (FOM), which consisted of various East Timorese and foreign members, listed several problems and violations in its report. This concerned, in addition to the Frenti-Mudança's campaign with paid election workers, lack of checking for stained fingers of voters (the sign that they had already voted) and the appearance at election rallies of men in traditional dress wielding traditional weapons such as spears and surik. While FOM recognises that these are part of the country's folklore, they see a fundamental problem with the appearance of armed people in election campaigns. The Chefe de Suco of Lelaufe announced at an election rally in Lifau that he would force all parties in his Suco to remove all banners and party flags that were not from the CNRT. In the two polling stations in Lelaufe, the CNRT only received 32.63% and 44.20%.

The non-governmental organisation Fundasaun Mahein recommended that the new government establish clear rules on party funding and party donations based on the experience of the elections.

== Results ==
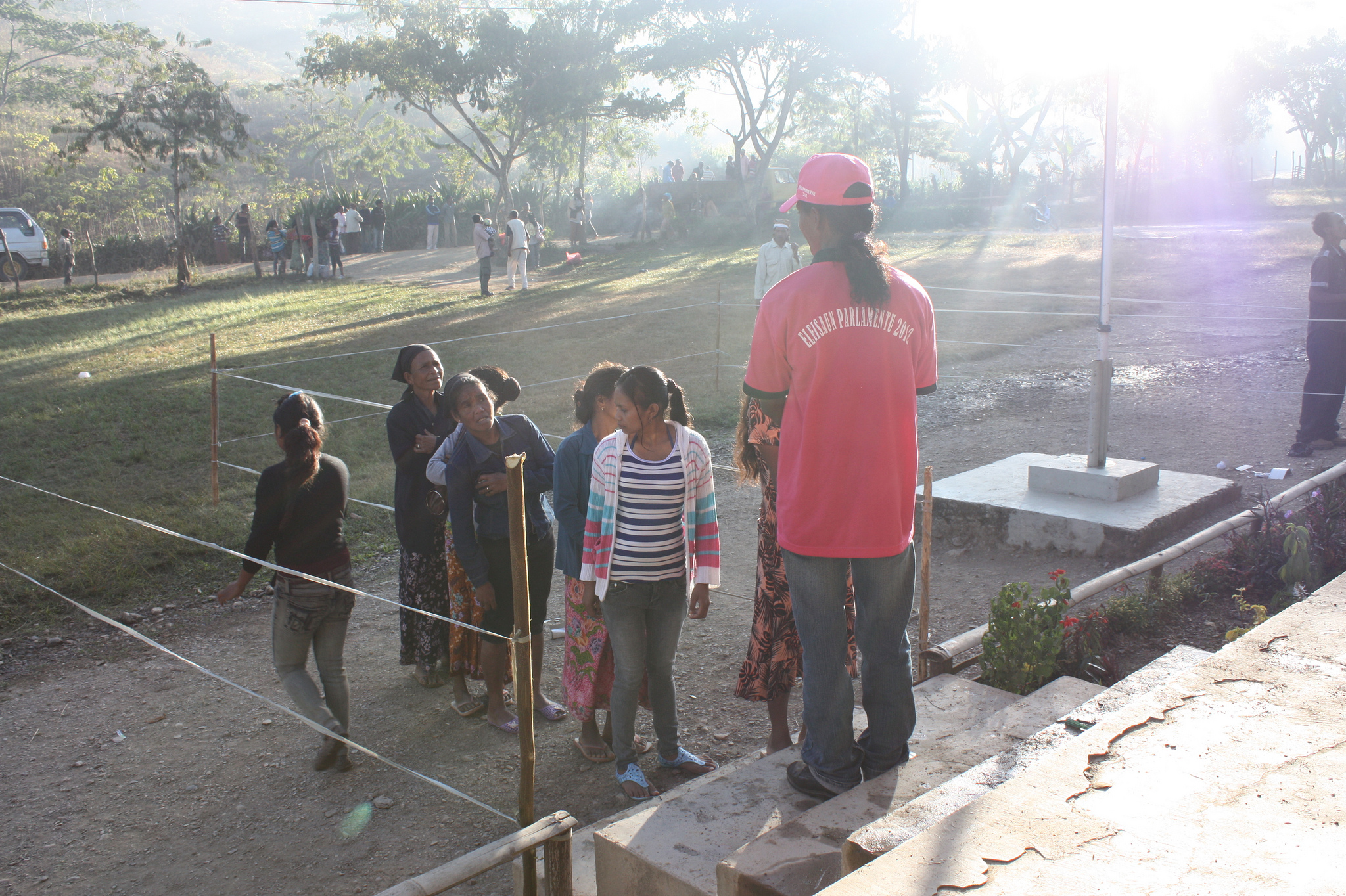
Polling station in Estado (Ermera)

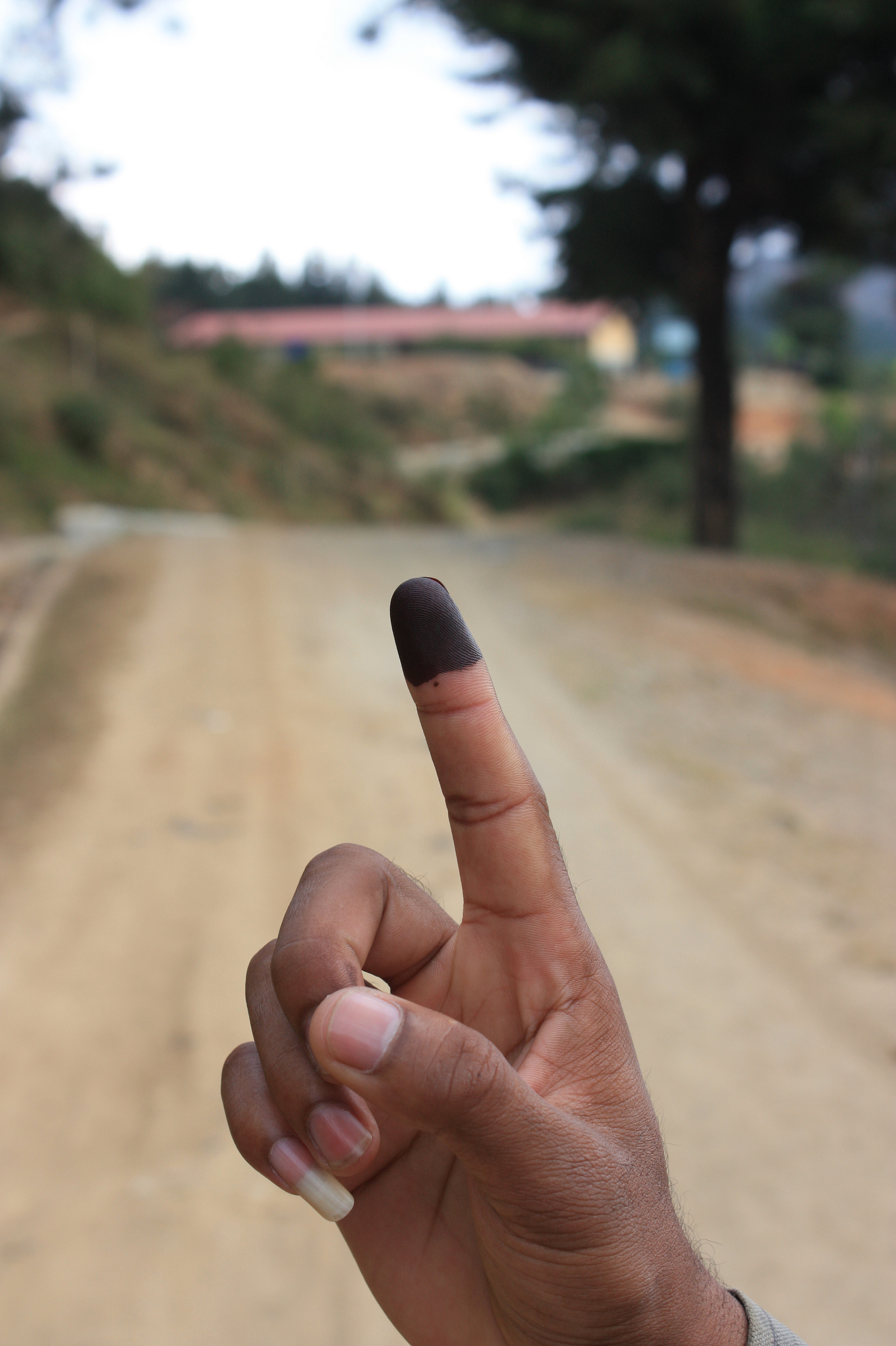
"I voted!" Ink-stained finger

According to the preliminary final results, the CNRT is in the lead with 36.66% (30 seats), followed by Fretilin with 29.87% (25 seats). The PD obtained 10.31% (8 seats) and the Frenti-Mudança 3.11% (2 seats). The turnout was 74.78%. The other parties and alliances failed to clear the three-percent hurdle, including KHUNTO with a narrow 2.97%. The official final result was published by the CNE on 13 July. It confirmed the previously assumed distribution of seats.

Party	Votes	%	Seats	+/–
National Congress for Timorese Reconstruction	172,831	36.66	30	+12
Fretilin	140,786	29.87	25	+4
Democratic Party	48,581	10.31	8	0
Frenti-Mudança	14,648	3.11	2	New
Kmanek Haburas Unidade Nasional Timor Oan	13,998	2.97	0	New
Socialist Party of Timor	11,379	2.41	0	0
Social Democratic Party	10,158	2.15	0	–
National Development Party	9,386	1.99	0	New
Timorese Social Democratic Association	8,487	1.80	0	–
National Unity of Timorese Resistance	7,041	1.49	0	–2
Timorese Democratic Union	5,332	1.13	0	0
Republican Party	4,270	0.91	0	0
PLPA–PDRT coalition	4,012	0.85	0	0
Timorese Monarchist People's Association	3,968	0.84	0	New
National Unity Party	3,191	0.68	0	–3
Coligação Bloco Proclamador (PMD–PARENTIL)	3,125	0.66	0	0
Democratic Alliance (KOTA–PTT)	2,622	0.56	0	–2
Timorese Democratic Party	2,561	0.54	0	0
Liberal Party	2,222	0.47	0	New
People's Development Party	1,904	0.40	0	New
Christian Democratic Party	887	0.19	0	0
Total	471,389	100.00	65	0
Valid votes	471,389	97.64		
Invalid/blank votes	11,403	2.36		
Total votes	482,792	100.00		
Registered voters/turnout	645,624	74.78		
Source: STAE, SAPO

== Aftermath ==
PD Deputy Secretary General Samuel Mendonça stated on 10 July 2012 that the PD would go into opposition if independents were included in the cabinet. This would not correspond to the PD's criteria. Nevertheless, the new East Timorese cabinet also included independent members. CNRT General Secretary Babo Soares announced that after the party congress on 15 July, Fretilin and PD would be invited to coalition talks. Until then, informal talks would continue. The non-governmental organisation La'o Hamutuk spoke out against the idea of a government of national unity made up of CNRT and Fretilin. It would speak against the needs of a pluralist state. In contrast, the veterans' organization CPD-RDTL called for an agreement between CNRT and Fretilin, saying their leaders both came from the common front of the independence movement and could therefore form a joint government. The Timorese should not imitate the international concept of the opposition, said the CPD-RDTL spokesperson. On 15 July, the CNRT announced that it would form a coalition with the PD and Frenti-Mudança. Fretilin MP and former Prime Minister Estanislau da Silva was calm in the face of the CNRT party congress' decision. The new parliament convened for the first time on 30 July 2012.

On the nights of 15–17 July, violent riots broke out in Dili's Comoro neighbourhood and other outskirts. In Hera, Armindo Pereira Alves, a student and Fretilin supporter from Uato-Lari, was shot dead by a police officer. The officer was then temporarily suspended. When Alves' body was returned to his home, there was an attack on the police station in Uato-Lari. Four PNTL and UNPOL cars were destroyed. Uato-Lari has long been considered a region of unrest, with violent clashes occurring regularly. 15 other people, including four police officers, were injured in the riots in Dili. 60 cars and seven houses were destroyed. 16 people were arrested by the police when they damaged the An-Nur Mosque, Timor-Leste's largest mosque. National police chief Longuinhos Monteiro denied a political motivation behind the violence and Fretilin denied any responsibility for the outbreak of violence. Fretilin General Secretary Marí Alkatiri, however, blamed members of the CNRT. He said that they had spoken disparagingly about Fretilin in a discussion broadcast live on television and had provoked the unrest. Alkatiri, however, said that the CNRT had the right to form a coalition without Fretilin and that they still wanted to work with the government. CNRT General Secretary, Babo Soares, apologised for the harsh words of his party colleagues. But the head of the Australian election observers Damien Kingsbury also blamed the unrest on the disappointment of Fretilin supporters who had believed in the success of the campaign to return to government. The police brought the situation back under their control by morning. UNMIT did not consider the outbreak of violence as a "major security incident."
