= Bloku Unidade Popular =

Popular Unity Block Bloku Unidade Popular
- Abbreviation: BUP
- Founded: 1 July 2015
- Youth wing: J-BUP
- Ideology: Humanism; Social justice
- Political position: Center-left
- National affiliation: PDRT; PMD; PLPA

Party flag
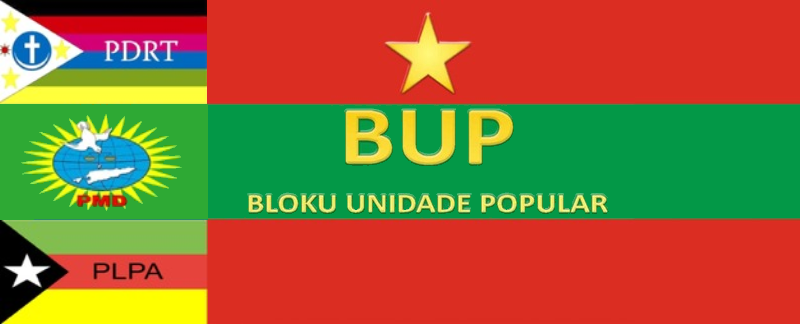

The Bloku Unidade Popular (Tetum) is a political party alliance in East Timor.

== History ==
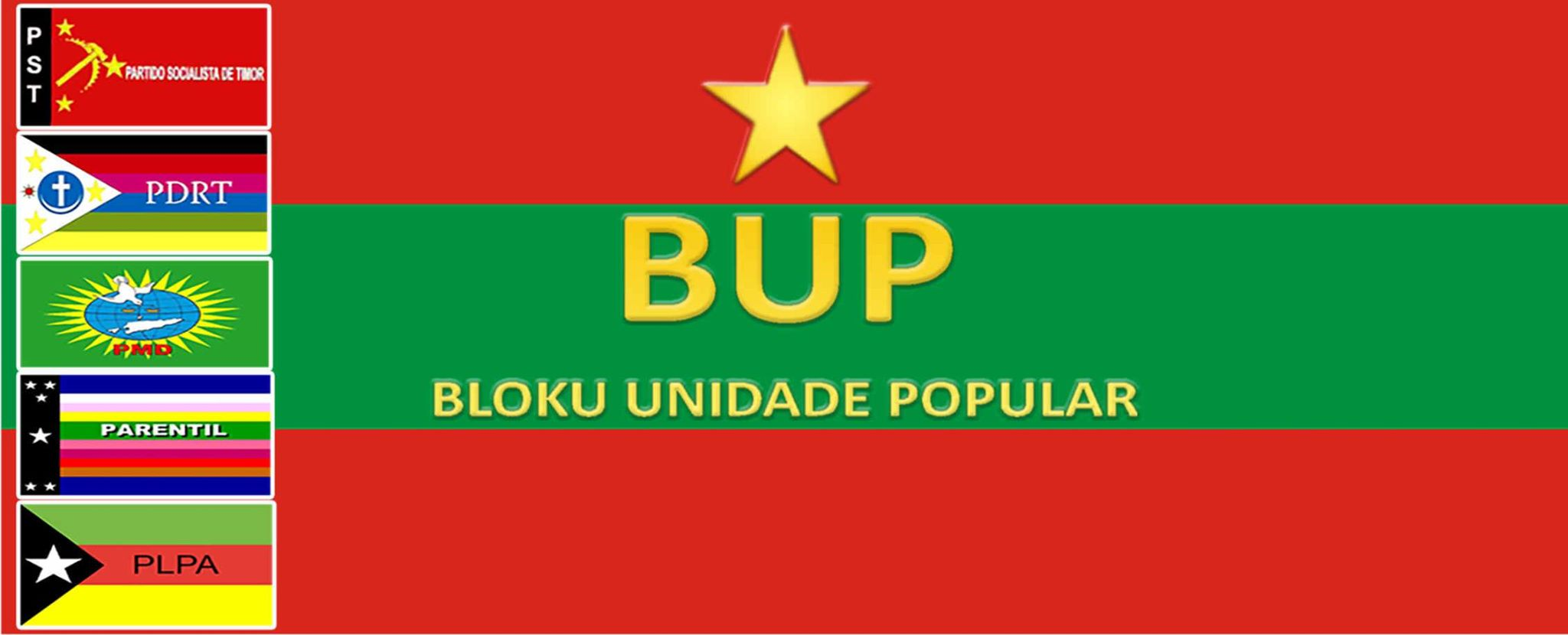
Flag of the BUP until 2016

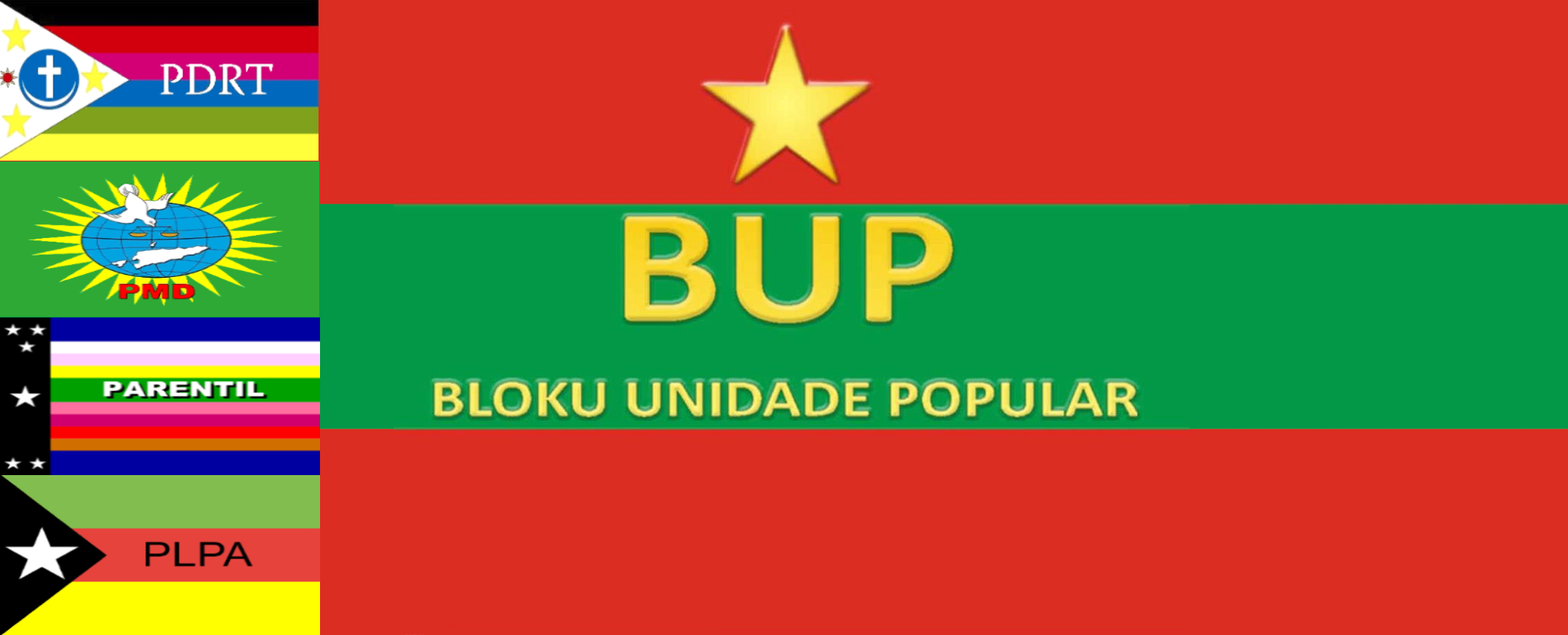
Flag of the BUP until 2017

The Partido Democrática Republica de Timor (PDRT), Partido Milénio Democrático (PMD), Partido Republika Nacional Timor Leste (PARENTIL), Partidu Liberta Povu Aileba (PLPA), and the Partido Socialista de Timor (PST) resolved to form the alliance at a national convention on 1 July 2015. It was officially registered with the East Timor Supreme Court of Justice in Dili on 13 July. On 29 July, it was officially presented to the public at the Hotel Timor. On 18 September, the headquarters at Bidau (Dili) was opened.

All member parties of the alliance failed to meet the three-percent hurdle at the 2012 parliamentary elections. The aim of the alliance was to work together at future elections. The BUP member parties received in total 3.48% of the valid votes (18,516 votes). For that election, PARENTIL and PMD were already in a coalition as the Coligação Bloco Proclamador, as were the PDRT and PLPA as the Coligação PLPA/PDRT.

On 27 July 2016, the PST left the alliance. As the electoral register was being drawn up at the Supreme Court at the beginning of June 2017, PARENTIL also withdrew, leaving only the PDRT, PMD, and PLPA in the BUP. PARENTIL did not participate in the 2017 parliamentary election, while the PST stood by itself. Disagreements were cited in the press release as the reason for both parties leaving. The BUP received 0.88% of the vote in 2017, failing to meet the four-percent hurdle.

== Members, programme, and structure ==
The founding chairperson is Cecilio Caminha Freitas, a former delegate of the ruling party, CNRT. Hermenegildo Kupa Lopes, party chief of the PMD, is the vice-president. Until the exit of the PST, the secretary general was Avelino Coelho da Silva, who was state secretary to the Cabinet of East Timor since 2012, despite not belonging to any of the parties in Parliament. As of 2017, the acting secretary general is Vicente Sanches Soares.

The BUP was to develop a joint electoral programme, based on the principles of humanism, social solidarity, and social justice.

The BUP also has a youth organism, the Joventude Bloku Unidade Popular (J-BUP).
