= Timorese Labour Party =

East Timor Political Party

Timorese Labour Party Partido Trabalhista Timorense
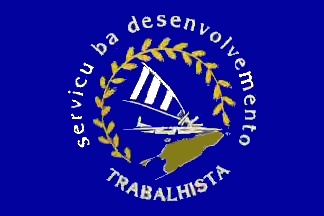
- Abbreviation: PT, PTT
- President: Maria Angela Freitas
- Founders: Paulo Freitas da Silva Albano, Domingos da Conceição Pereira and Alpido Abrão Martins
- Founded: 5 September 1974; 51 years ago
- Headquarters: Bairo Formosa (Gricenfor), Rua de Bé Fonte, Dili, East Timor
- Membership (2001): 2,500 members
- Ideology: Democratic socialism Eco-socialism; Feminism
- Political position: Centre-left
- International affiliation: Socialist International (Planned)
- Colours: Blue Gold
- Slogan: "Service for Development" (Tetum: Servico ba Desenvolvemento)
- National Parliament: 0 / 65

Website
- partidotrabalhista.wordpress.com

The Timorese Labour Party (Portuguese: Partido Trabalhista Timorense, abbreviated as PT), or Trabalhista for short (in other sources also Partido Trabalhista Timorense PTT), is one of the five parties in East Timor founded as early as 1974. The party describes itself as democratic and socialist, comparable to the Australian Labor Party (ALP). It has its headquarters in Dili on Rua de Bé Fonte in Bairo Formosa (Gricenfor).

== History ==
The party was founded on September 5, 1974, by the now deceased Paulo Freitas da Silva Albano, Domingos da Conceição Pereira and Alpido Abrão Martins. The party favored independence from the then colonial power Portugal, but argued for a gradual disengagement with further ties to Portugal. It saw itself as a representative of the workers and an alternative to the supposedly communist Fretilin. At its founding, the party consisted of only ten members, it remained small and insignificant. The colonial administration even refused to recognize it as a party.

Freitas da Silva wrote to the then Australian Prime Minister Gough Whitlam asking for troops to help keep peace in the country. The request was declined. Domingos da Conceição Pereira officially signed the Balibo Declaration for Trabalhista, in which all East Timorese parties except Fretilin are said to have demanded an Indonesian invasion of East Timor. However, the declaration, a draft of the Indonesian secret service, was signed in Bali and not in Balibo, possibly under pressure from the Indonesian government.

On March 31, 1986, the Trabalhista, together with the other East Timorese parties, founded the National Timorese Convergence (Convergencia Nacional Timorense CNT) as an umbrella organization for Timorese resistance to Indonesian occupation. This association soon broke up, however. A new attempt was made in 1988 with the Conselho Nacional de Resistência Maubere (CNRM), which was finally renamed the Conselho Nacional de Resistência Timorense (CNRT) in 1998. Like the other members of the CNRT, Trabalhista rejected Indonesia's offer of autonomy and called for a referendum. Trabalhista sees the referendum in August 1999 as a conclusion to the past and a new beginning. Already under the administration of UNTAET, Trabalhista criticized authoritarian tendencies and lack of transparency from the CNRT's leading politicians, Xanana Gusmão and José Ramos-Horta. Trabalhista even demonstrated, although a member himself, against the leadership of the CNRT and later against the installation of the second transitional cabinet.

In the parliamentary elections on August 30, 2001, the party received 0.56% of the vote and thus none of the 88 seats in East Timor's parliament. Trabalhista did not run its own list in the 2007 elections.

In the 2012 parliamentary elections, Trabalhista and Klibur Oan Timor Asuwain (KOTA) formed a joint electoral list named Aliança Democrática. However, it failed to clear the three-percent hurdle with only 2,622 votes (0.56%). Aliança Democrática achieved its best result in the then municipality of Ainaro with 0.92% of the vote.

== Members ==
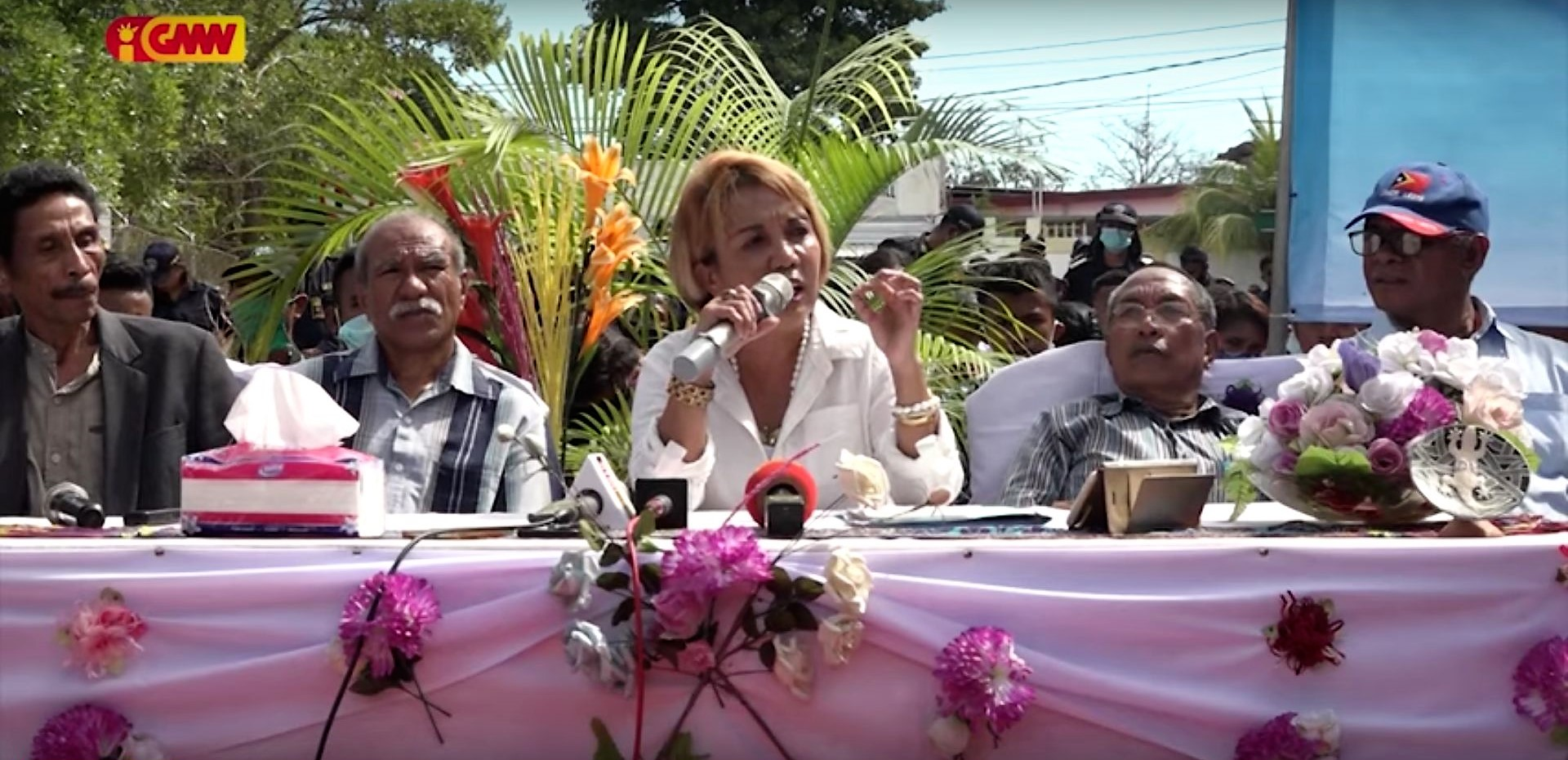
Angela Freitas providing a speech. to her left Aitahan Matak, and other RNDJK leaders (July 17, 2020)

Trabalhista had about 2500 members in 2001, with associations in all 13 districts of East Timor at the time. About 45% of the members are women, as are half of the board members. Under the chairman and vice-chairman, there are three secretaries and three treasurers.

Paulo Freitas da Silva was originally the party leader and one of the founders of Trabalhista. During the Indonesian occupation, he sat for five years as a Partai Demokrasi Indonesia (PDI) deputy in Timor Timur's Indonesian parliament and was president of the East Timorese federation of SBSI, the Indonesian Workers Welfare Union. On the CNRT Permanent Council, Freitas da Silva was the Trabalhista representative.

Maria Angela Freitas took over in 2007 from her late father Paulo Freitas da Silva the party chairmanship (as of the end of 2011). She had previously been vice president and a member of the National Council. She withdrew her candidacy for the presidential elections in 2007 due to the "poor and unstable situation" that would not allow for correct elections. On January 11, 2012, Angela Freitas announced her candidacy in the 2012 presidential elections in East Timor. However, she was not admitted due to lack of sufficient supporting signatures. In 2017, she announced her candidacy again.

Dr. Nélson Martins was Secretary General of Trabalhista from March 2000 to July 2007. The doctor received his training in Bandung, Indonesia and Australia. Between 1995 and 1998, he worked against child labour in Indonesia. From August 2007 to 2012, Martins was Minister of Health in the government of Xanana Gusmão.

== Politics ==
The party advocates a democratic socialization of industry, the markets, commodity production, and property distribution to the extent necessary to end exploitation and other antisocial activities. All members of society should be able to share in political and economic power and control the institutions of the state. Job creation and the interests of trade unions are among Trabalhista's main points. The party planned to join the Socialist International in 2001. The education system and health care should be freely accessible to everyone. Traditions are to be protected. Trabalhista called for Tetum and English as official languages in 2001. Human rights, and especially women's rights, are a focal point in the party as the basis for tolerance and a multicultural society. Child labour is to be combated.
