= Mauk Moruk =

Mauk Moruk, born Paulino Gama, (22 June 1955 – 8 August 2015) was an East Timorese former Falintil guerrilla commander, opposition figure, and rebel leader of the Maubere Revolutionary Council (KRM). Moruk was a critic of the policies of the independent government of East Timor, advocating that the government do more to alleviate widespread unemployment and poverty in the country. Moruk was particularly critical of the policies of former President Xanana Gusmão, who is also a former guerilla leader, during the Indonesian occupation of East Timor.

Moruk was born Paulino Gama in Laga, Portuguese Timor. Moruk's brother is Cornelio Gama, a former FALINTIL commander, former member of the National Parliament, and leader of the National Unity of Timorese Resistance (UNDERTIM) political party since its founding in 2005.

Mauk Moruk was a senior commander in the Falintil, the military wing of the Revolutionary Front for an Independent East Timor (FRETILIN) during the war for independence against Indonesia. In 1984, Moruk was one of four Falintil officers who staged an internal coup attempt against the Commander of Falintil, Xanana Gusmão. The coup against Gusmão failed. In the aftermath of the failed coup, Maruk surrendered to Indonesian authorities and eventually went into exile in the Netherlands.

Moruk eventually returned to East Timor from exile in the Netherlands. He founded the Maubere Revolutionary Council (KRM), also called the Revolutionary Council (KR), a paramilitary group. Under Maruk, the KRM sought popular support against the government through grassroots (known as maubere locally) appeals.

In March 2015, Moruk's rebel group, the Maubere Revolutionary Council (KRM), began a series of attacks on police. Members of the KRM attacked a police compound using explosives and guns, in one of the March 2015 attacks, injuring four security personnel.

The East Timorese government launched a military campaign against the KRM in March, announcing that the joint operation to "prevent and suppress criminal actions from illegal groups" in a May 2015 statement. According to the government, a number of KRM members had surrendered as a result.

Mauk Moruk, the head of the KRM, was killed in a joint police and military operation against the group in the suco (village) of Fatulia on Saturday, August 8, 2015. He died at the age of 60. The government of East Timor released a statement on the operation following Moruk's death, stating, "Every effort was made during the operation to avoid this outcome," a government spokesman said in a statement, calling for calm. "Regrettably the operation was unable to avoid a confrontation resulting in an exchange of gunfire."

Moruk's death raised concerns that there could be an escalation of unrest in East Timor.
