= Frenti-Mudança =

Front for National Reconstruction of Timor-Leste – Change Frente de Reconstrução Nacional de Timor-Leste – Mudança
- Abbreviation: Frenti–Mudança
- Leader: José Luís Guterres
- Founded: 2011
- Split from: FRETILIN
- Ideology: Social democracy Reformism
- Political position: Centre-left
- National Parliament: 0 / 65

Party flag
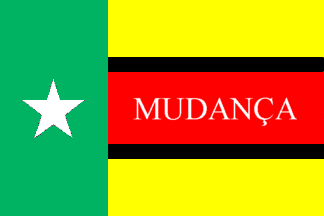

The Front for National Reconstruction of Timor-Leste – Change (Portuguese: Frente de Reconstrução Nacional de Timor-Leste – Mudança, Frenti–Mudança) is a political party in East Timor led by Vice-Prime minister José Luís Guterres.

== History ==
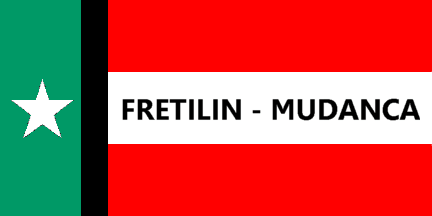
Flag of the Fretilin-Mudança until August 2011

The party began as a left-wing, reformist faction within FRETILIN named FRETILIN Mudança, seeking to reform the party from within. In April 2006 the group attempted to remove Marí Alkatiri as FRETILIN general secretary. In the 2007 elections the group supported the former FRETILIN member José Ramos-Horta for the presidency and the National Congress for Timorese Reconstruction in the parliamentary elections. Group leader José Luis Guterres was appointed Vice Prime Minister in the Xanana Gusmão-led government.

Following the elections, the group renamed itself FRETLIN (removing the "I" for independence) and attempted to register as a political party for the 2012 elections. However, the Court of Appeal rejected the application, deeming that its name was too similar to FRETILIN. It submitted a second application under the name "FRENTI-Mudança", which was accepted in July 2011, although the party was forced to change its flag, as it was deemed too similar to that of FRETILIN.
