= Democratic Liberal Party (Timor-Leste) =

Democratic Liberal Party Partidu Democrática Liberal
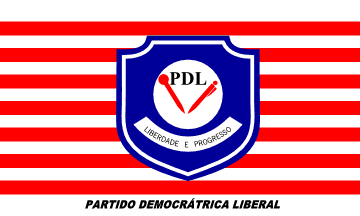
- Abbreviation: PDL
- President: Marito de Araújo
- Secretary-General: Gaspar de Araújo
- Founder: Armando José Dourado da Silva
- Founded: 2001
- Dissolved: 2017
- Ideology: Conservative liberalism
- Political position: Centre-right
- Slogan: "Religion, Culture, Freedom" (Tetum: Relijaun, Kultura, Liberdade)
- National Parliament: 0 / 65

Website
- libertamaubere.wordpress.com

The Democratic Liberal Party (Tetum: Partidu Democrática Liberal, abbreviated as PDL) was a centre-right conservative-liberal party in Timor-Leste (formerly East Timor). It was founded as the Liberal Party (Indonesian: Partai Liberal) in May 2001, and renamed in 2011.

== Members ==
In 2011, the party leader was founding president Armando José Dourado da Silva. The vice-president at the time of its foundation was Fernando Mara Sousa, Secretary General Latino Quimbra.

Before the 2012 elections, Silva was succeeded as president by Marito de Araújo. The General Secretary is Gaspar de Araújo.

== Background ==
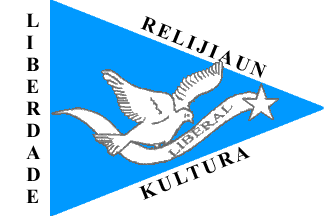
Flag of Partai Liberal (2001)

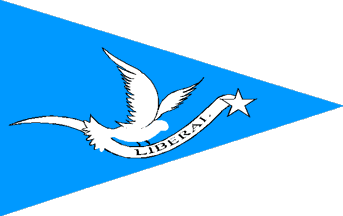
Flag of Partai Liberal (2007)

The PL has its roots in the Frente Iha Timor Unidos Nafatin (FITUN), a youth independence organisation, although it is not a simple transformation. Several leading members come from FITUN. Some sources report that FITUN split over the issue. Liberal parties from other countries, such as the United Kingdom, were taken as a model.

The party is considered liberal and right-wing. The party motto, adopted from the Liberal party, is Relijaun (religion), Kultura (culture), Liberdade (freedom). The party motto is used in Tetum, while most other parties use Portuguese or both official languages together, at least in the early days.

When the PL was founded, its members were primarily young people who had participated in the resistance against the Indonesian occupation. In the first parliamentary elections on 30 August 2001, the party received 1.10% of the vote and thus one of the total of 88 seats in the East Timorese parliament. Party leader Silva took the seat in the Constituent Assembly and the later parliament, but was temporarily replaced by Carlos de Almeida Sarmento as a deputy. The PL had its strongholds in the districts of Oe-Cusse Ambeno (5.7%) and Viqueque (3.1%).

In the 2007 parliamentary elections on 30 June, the Partai Liberal did not run with its own list following a decision by party leader Silva. Instead, he ran for the Congresso Nacional da Reconstrução Timorense (CNRT). On 9 June 2007, 250 PL members, led by Marcus de Conceição, therefore declared their accession to the Democratic Party (PD). Silva was unable to win a seat in parliament on the CNRT list.

In the parliamentary elections on 7 July 2012, the Democratic Liberal Party failed to clear the three-percent hurdle with 0.47% (2,222 votes). Instead of party leader Marito de Araújo, General Secretary Gaspar de Araújo had headed the list. In the Ermera Municipality, the PDC achieved its best result with 1.79%. The PDL did not field a slate of candidates in the 2017 and 2018.
