= Ángela Freitas =

East Timorese politician

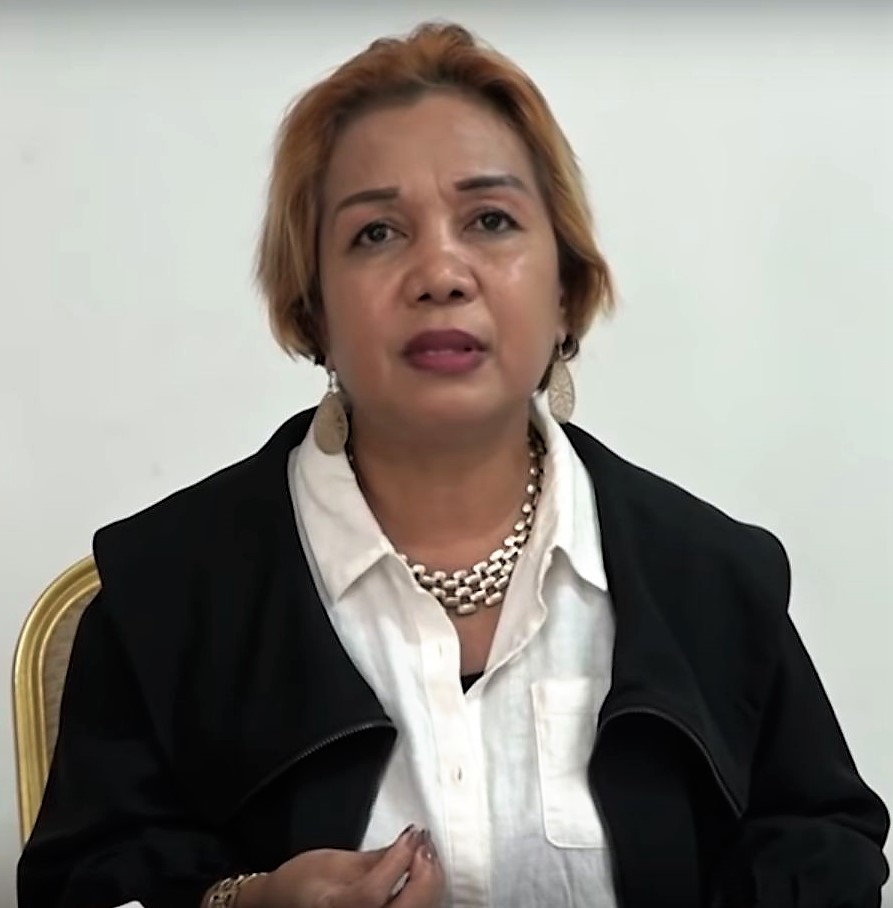
- Freitas in 2020

Personal details
- Party: Timorese Workers' Party
- Parent: Paulo Freitas (father)
- Education: University of Queensland
- Occupation: Doctor, politician

Military service
- Branch/service: Royal Australian Navy

Ángela Freitas is an East Timorese politician, who is the leader of the Timorese Labor Party and ran in the 2017 East Timorese presidential election.

== Biography ==
While a student, Ángela Freitas was tortured by the Indonesian Army during the Indonesian occupation of East Timor. In 1988, she worked for the Institute of Human Rights within Indonesia, moving on to work for Amnesty International in 1989 as secretary of human rights. In the 1990s she fled to Australia, where she studied at the University of Queensland. Graduating with qualifications in political science and medicine, she started work at a hospital in Brisbane. This included a secondment into the Royal Australian Navy, where she worked on board a patrol vessel which intercepted refugee boats.

Following the end of the Indonesian occupation in 1999, she returned to East Timor. Freitas became the leader of the Timorese Labor Party, a party founded in 1974 by her father Paulo Freitas. In 2001, she was placed in a men's prison along with her children, accused of the murder of an Australian. After two weeks, she was released without charge, the victim was never found. Freitas attempted to run during the 2012 East Timorese presidential election, but her candidacy was rejected by the President of the Supreme Court after she failed to meet the criteria to stand. She was blamed in 2004 by the East Timor Government for a series of protests against President Xanana Gusmão.

After undergoing surgery in Bali in 2014, she was arrested upon her return to East Timor. Freitas was arrested again the following year, after allegedly supporting Mauk Moruk. Freitas ran once again for President during the 2017 East Timorese presidential election. She finished seventh in the polling, with a total of 4,353 votes, equivalent to a 0.84% share.
