= People's Party of Timor =

People's Party of Timor Partido do Povo de Timor
- Abbreviation: PPT
- Founded: May 2000
- Dissolved: 2012
- Ideology: Conservatism
- Political position: Right-wing
- National Parliament: 0 / 65

Party flag

The People's Party of Timor (Portuguese: Partido do Povo de Timor; abbreviated PPT) is a conservative political party in East Timor. Its predecessor was the Movimento do Povo de Timor-Leste MPTL (Movement of the People of Timor-Leste). The PPT is described as a conservative, backward-looking traditional party with utopian ideas and monarchist and religious tendencies.

== General ==
The party has its supporters primarily among Timor's traditional petty kings, the Liurai, primarily in the municipality of Ainaro.

The party has its roots in the section of the population that was in favor of East Timor's permanent annexation to Indonesia. Among the founders was Ermino da Silva da Costa, a former leading member of APODETI, a party that was already striving to join Indonesia in 1974. Because of this background, the PPT was also never a member of the Conselho Nacional de Resistência Timorense (CNRT), the umbrella organization of East Timorese groups and parties striving for independence. Costa was number three in the hierarchy of pro-Indonesian militias in East Timor, after João da Costa Tavares and Eurico Guterres, and a member of the Uni Timor Aswain (UNTAS) its political wing. He separated from both after the referendum on East Timor's independence in August 1999, which turned out in their favour, accepted the result and now worked together with UNTAET.

The party chairman was originally Jacob Xavier, who described himself as a direct descendant of the Portuguese royal family and who regularly drew attention to himself with very eccentric statements. Vice President and Secretary General is Francisco Pinto, Liurai of Uatucarbau.

Pinto explained that the PPT stands for the introduction of a two-bank system (one bank for the Liurais, one for the ordinary people), the reinstatement of the Ten Commandments, and is anti-communist. Pinto could not explain details in an interview. Only party chairman Xavier knows the details, and as a studied theologian he speaks in such a "high language" that all other party members do not understand him.

The PPT supports the current republican political system after a monarchy failed to materialize so far. During the UN administration of East Timor (1999-2002), the PPT supported Xanana Gusmão as a candidate for the future presidency. During the first legislative period of Parliament (2001-2007), the PPT repeatedly supported FRETILIN on bills, including the unpopular legislation on the pensions of members of Parliament.

The PPT is linked to the Colimau 2000.

== Performance in elections ==
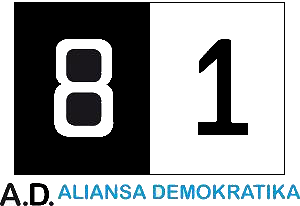
Flag of the Aliança Democratica

In the first legislative elections, 30 August 2001, the party won 2.01% of the popular vote, winning two of the 88 seats in East Timor's Parliament, primarily in Ainaro, Oe-Cusse Ambeno and Dili. In addition to Jacob Xavier, Ananias do Carmo Fuka also sat in Parliament for the PPT.

In the 2007 presidential campaign, Xavier and the PPT supported KOTA 's Manuel Tilman, giving him the highest number of votes in seven sucos. Overall, however, it was only 4.09%. For the first parliamentary elections after independence on June 30, 2007, the PPT drew up a joint electoral list with KOTA under the name Aliança Democratica KOTA/PPT. Aliança Democratica KOTA/PPT ultimately received 13,294 votes, or 3.20% of the valid votes. Its greatest support was in the then district of Ainaro, where it received 18.15% (4,066 votes) of the vote and became the second strongest list. The Alliance still received over 1,000 votes in the following districts:

- Dili: 1.329 Votes(1,63 %)
- Ermera: 1.265 Votes(2,97 %)
- Aileu: 1.012 Votes (5,60 %)

According to provisional results, the party won together with the Association of Timorese Heroes 3.20% of the vote in the June 2007 parliamentary election, and 2 seats. Manuel Tilman of KOTA and Jacob Xavier then entered the National Parliament of East Timor with 65 deputies on behalf of the alliance. The alliance was dissolved after the election. The PPT was not admitted to the 2012 parliamentary elections because it did not submit its electoral list to the electoral authorities by the deadline. Jacob Xavier instead ran on the list of the Partido Democrático (PD) and was thus able to re-enter the national parliament. However, he died only a few weeks later.

In the 2017 parliamentary elections, the PPT fell out of the round of competing parties when the lists of supporters were examined. It had not met the necessary eligibility criteria.

== Party flag ==
Flag of the Kingdom of Portugal (1910)

Flag of the People's Party of Timor

The Movimento Nacional para a Libertação de Timor-Díli (1979) and Movimento Popular Timor-Leste (1985), co-founded by party leader Jacob Xavier, already had blue and white flags, similar to the old royal flag of Portugal. And the emblem of today's party flag was also already in use. It shows royal Timorese symbols, such as the Kaibauk crown or the Belak disc. It also features the coat of arms of Portugal and two roosters as shield bearers. Also a relic of the predecessor movements is the name Timor-Dili on the banner, a replacement for the old colonial name Portuguese Timor.
