= 2009 East Timorese local elections =

Local elections were held in East Timor on 9 October 2009 to elect for Village Chiefs (Chefe do Suco) and delegates for Village Councils (Conselho do Suco) in 442 sucos (villages). It included the election of Hamlet Chiefs (Chefe do Aldeia) in aldeias (communities). Elected officials will serve a six-year term.

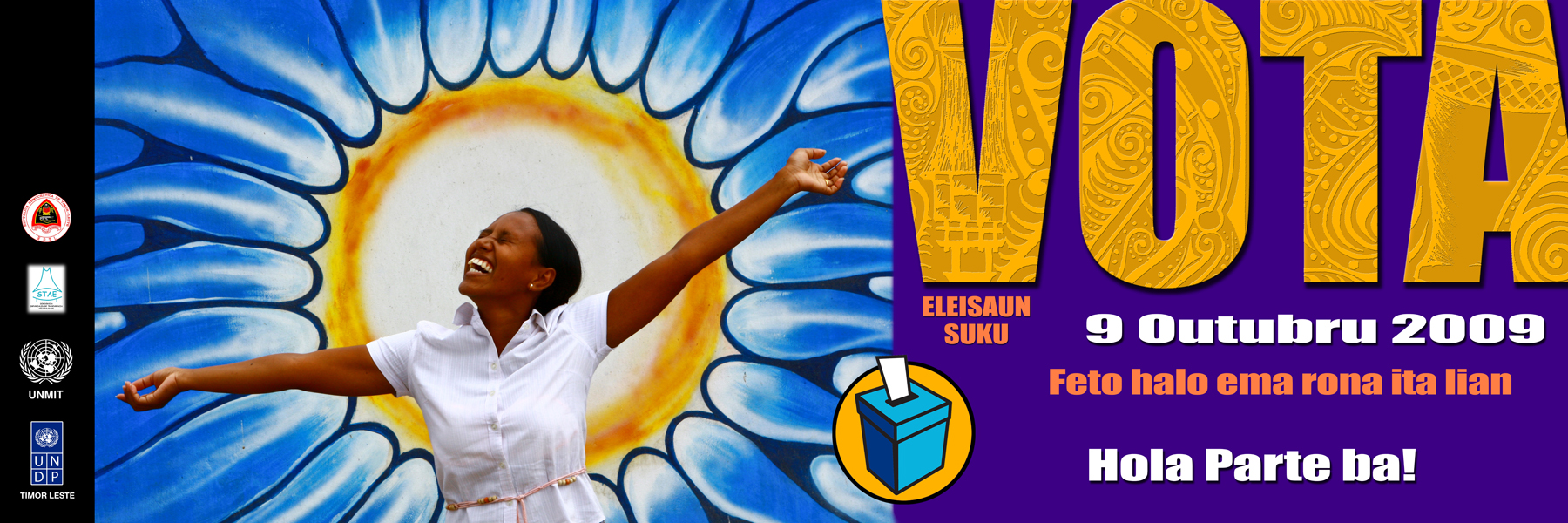
Poster calling for greater participation by women in the local elections in East Timor in 2009.

On 13 October 2009, although no official parties participated in the election as electoral laws prohibited candidates from representing any political parties, Fretilin claimed victory in the said election saying that they "picked up 56% of positions with another 10% of positions being taken by FRETILIN and allied party shared tickets. In Dili FRETILIN won 60% of the Suco leadership positions."
