= Manuel Tilman =

East Timorese politician

Manuel Tilman (born 20 August 1946 in Maubisse) is an East Timorese politician. He was a candidate in the April 2007 presidential election.

== Life and career ==
Manuel Tilman is a professor, lawyer, and the secretary-general of the Association of Timorese Heroes (KOTA). He held one of the two parliamentary seats won by KOTA in the August 2001 parliamentary election. He was member of the house of representatives of the ASDI in the Assembly of the Portuguese Republic. It was fixed, later, in Macau. He belonged as director of the CNRT in the Convention of Peniche.

Tilman ran as the KOTA candidate in the 2007 presidential election, receiving sixth place and 4.09% of the vote.

In the June 2007 parliamentary election, Tilman again won a seat in parliament as one of two candidates from an alliance of KOTA and the People's Party of Timor (PPT) to be elected; he was the first name the alliance's candidate list.
