= La'o Hamutuk =

East Timorese think tank

- Timor-Leste Institute for Development Monitoring and Analysis
- Instituto ba Analiza no Monitor Dezenvolvimento iha Timor-Leste
- Formation: May 2000; 26 years ago
- Type: Think tank collective NGO
- Purpose: Development monitoring and analysis
- Headquarters: Rua do Salmão, Marconi
- Location: Dili, East Timor
- Coordinates: -8.551289080316824, 125.55900135907797
- Region served: Timor-Leste
- Official languages: Tetum, English
- Website: www.laohamutuk.org

La'o Hamutuk (Tetum for "walking together"), or the Timor-Leste Institute for Development Monitoring and Analysis, is an East Timorese non-governmental organisation (NGO). It is based on Rua da Salmão in Marconi, in the national capital, Dili.

The organisation is a progressive think tank collective that analyzes and reports on development issues, rights and processes, including the actions of international institutions and the government of East Timor. Its work is published in Tetum and in English.

== History ==
La'o Hamutuk was founded during the UN administration of East Timor in 2000 by local and international human rights activists and activists who had campaigned for East Timor's independence from Indonesia. It has since followed East Timor's politics and monitored the country's various institutions. La'o Hamutuk does not accept grants from donors who may have a significant interest in East Timor. So, for example, it is not funded by the United Nations and its organizations, the World Bank, the Asian Development Bank, the International Monetary Fund, as well as the major development aid donors in East Timor, the East Timor government or political parties, or companies operating there. Rather, it relies on private foundations, NGOs, governments of small countries and individual donations.

== Activities ==
La'o Hamutuk analyzes political developments and processes in the East Timorese government and international organisations in East Timor, and reports on them. In doing so, it seeks to facilitate greater levels of effective Timorese participation in the reconstruction and development of the country. La'o Hamutuk works to improve communication between international institutions and organizations and the various sectors of Timorese society. It also serves as a resource centre.

Topics of La'o Hamutuk publications include East Timor's dependency on petroleum exports, the dispute between East Timor and Australia over the boundary between the two nations, the national budget, food sovereignty and land rights, and media law. Many foreign embassies in Dili rely on La'o Hamutuk's analyses, which are available free of charge.

The organisation also produces its own half-hour radio program, in the Tetum language. The program, known as Programa Radio Igualdade, includes interviews and commentary on current topics, and can also be downloaded from the organisation's website.

== Staff ==
As of 2013, La'o Hamutuk had eight full-time employees from East Timor and two from abroad. Its structure is non-hierarchical, with two rotating coordinators. The local and international staff are employed under the same terms and conditions, and are paid the same salaries.

== Reception ==
According to analyst Gordon Peake, La'o Hamutuk "... is widely respected, mainly for the quality of its information, research, analysis, and comment on socio-economic issues, and many times it is the only organisation providing written comments on important issues such as the Petroleum Fund (PF) and the state budget."
