= National Unity Party (Timor-Leste) =

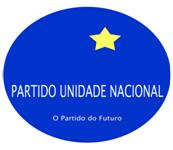
- Abbreviation: PUN
- Leader: Fernanda Borges
- Secretary-General: Maria Fatima de Deus
- Founded: October 2005
- Registered: 17 January 2007
- Dissolved: 2017
- Ideology: Christian democracy Economic liberalism Social conservatism Agrarianism; Anti-communism
- Political position: Right-wing

Party flag
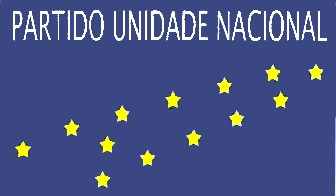

The National Unity Party (Partido Unidade Nacional) is a Christian democratic party in Timor-Leste (formerly East Timor). Its predecessor, the National Party (Partidu Nacional), was founded by Fernanda Borges in October 2005. From it emerged the PUN, which was officially registered on 17 January 2007. Leading members of the Colimau 2000 are members of the PUN. Parts of the Catholic Church in Timor-Leste also support the PUN. The party is centered in the western Municipalities of Ermera and Bobonaro. Party leader is Fernanda Borges, secretary general is Maria Fatima de Deus.

The party says it has a base of 100,000 people, which is a tenth of the population. At its founding party congress, 426 delegates from 131 villages from eight districts at the time are said to have been present. There was a dispute with the Ministry of Justice over the registration of the party. Only the Timor-Leste Supreme Court of Justice confirmed the registration for the parliamentary elections held on 30 June 2007. Of which, the party won 4.55% of the total votes and 3 seats in parliament including that of its leader Fernanda Borges. It did not win any seats in the 2012 election.

== Party manifesto ==
The party focuses on strengthening equality and democracy and champions human rights and Christian values. The basic needs of the people should be secured. The PUN believes that there is a lack of morality in Timorese politics and that Christian principles and politics are the solution. Like the UDT, the PUN believes it must oppose communists and their negative influence on Timorese politics.

In economic policy, the PUN relies on private companies for an expanding economy and to increase the standard of living and prosperity. The government is said to intervene little and the party wants to allow freer access to local markets. Industry is to be decentralized and agriculture further developed for export.

According to its own statements, the PUN stands for democracy, freedom of speech, freedom of religion and freedom of association. The separation of powers and law, fairness and equality for everyone are also part of the PUN program, as are equal rights for women and anti-corruption laws. At the municipal level there should be elected local governments. There should be justice for the victims of the violence from 1975 to 1999.

The National Police of Timor-Leste (PNTL) is to be reformed and better trained. Prostitution and abortion should be banned. Child mortality is to be reduced through pregnancy and postnatal counselling. There should be free education for all Timorese. Investments are to be made in infrastructure, especially in rural areas. However, the natural beauty of the country and the environment should be protected.

== Electoral performance ==
During the campaign for the 2007 parliamentary elections, the other parties strongly criticized the call by the Diocese of Dili for all Christians to vote for the PUN.

The PUN did not seek a government coalition with other parties. Borges held opinion that the then Prime Minister Marí Alkatiri, the then President Xanana Gusmão and his successor José Ramos-Horta was responsible for the unrest in Timor-Leste in 2006 and the desolate situation in the country. Even after the election, the party stuck to the position of: "We want to be an opposition party in the national parliament that focuses on justice and against nepotism, corruption and nepotism in the country"

The PUN received 18,896 votes, which corresponds to 4.55% of the valid votes. It found the greatest support in what was then Ermera District, where it received 19.17% (8,149 votes) of the vote and became the second strongest party. The PUN's voting share was also above average in the districts of Bobonaro (9.77%, 3,710 votes) and Manufahi (6.01%, 1,153 votes).

Three deputies initially represented the PUN in the National Parliament of Timor-Leste: Dr. Fernanda Mesquita Borges, José dos Reis Francisco Abel, and Vice Party leader Mateus de Jesus. In the course of the legislature, Abel left Parliament. Domingos Canossa Caldeira Mesquita replaced him. Mateus de Jesus left the PUN and then sat in Parliament as an independent MP until the end of the legislature.

In the parliamentary elections of 2012, the PUN failed with only 3,191 votes (0.68%) at the three percent hurdle. She achieved the best result in her old stronghold of Ermera with 1.45% of the votes and in Aileu with 1.40%.
