= Republican Party (Timor-Leste) =

Republican Party Partidu Republikanu
- Founded: 30 December 2005
- Ideology: Social democracy Decentralisation; Progressivism; Pacifism
- Political position: Center-left
- National Parliament: 0 / 65

Party flag

The Republican Party (Tetum: Partidu Republikanu) is a political party in Timor-Leste (formerly East Timor). In the parliamentary election held on 30 June 2007, the party won 1.06% of the total votes and did not win any seats in parliament, as it did not reach the 3% threshold to win seats.

== Election results ==
=== Legislative elections ===
Election	Party leader	Votes	%	Seats	+/–	Position	Government
2007	Joao Mariano Saldanha	4,408	1.06%	0 / 65	New	▲10th	Extra-parliamentary
2012	Joao Mariano Saldanha	4,270	0.91%	0 / 65	0	▼12th	Extra-parliamentary
2017	Joao Mariano Saldanha	3,591	0.70%	0 / 65	0	▼14th	Extra-parliamentary
2018	Joao Mariano Saldanha	4,125	0.66%	0 / 65	0	▲7th	Extra-parliamentary
2023	Joao Mariano Saldanha	1,558	0.22%	0 / 65	0	▼12th	Extra-parliamentary
