= José Luís Guterres =

East Timorese politician and diplomat (born 1954)

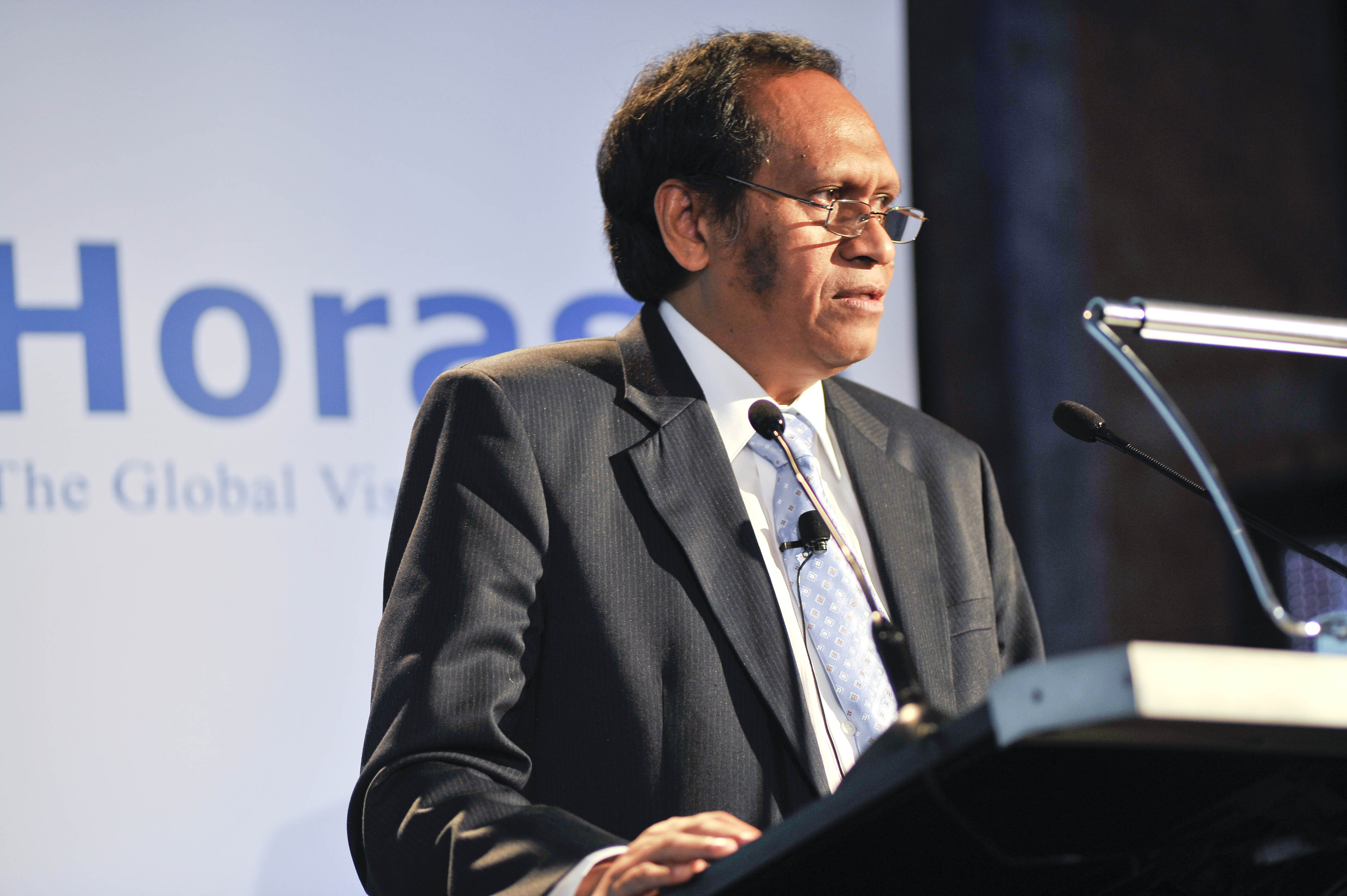
José Luís Guterres in 2010

José Luís Guterres (born 1 January 1954 in Uato-Lari, Portuguese Timor) is an East Timorese politician and diplomat.

== Education ==
Guterres studied at the University of Cambridge, the University of the Western Cape in South Africa, the Malaysian Institute of Diplomacy and Foreign Relations, and the Institute for Strategic and International Studies in Portugal.

== Career ==
Guterres was a member of the Central Committee of the former ruling party Fretilin. He served as the ambassador of the unrecognized East Timor government to Angola, Mozambique and the United Nations. When his country achieved independence in May 2002, he was appointed as the first East Timorese ambassador to the U.S. and concurrently the U.N.

In 2006, after an internal political crisis in East Timor, Guterres attempted to take over the leadership of Fretilin from Mari Alkatiri, the party's Secretary-General, but Alkatiri prevailed at a Fretilin national congress. Guterres was named foreign minister under Prime Minister José Ramos-Horta later in the year, serving in that position until May 2007.

Guterres' supporters, comprising a breakaway faction of Fretilin called "Mudança" (meaning "reform"), backed Fretilin's main rival, the National Congress for Timorese Reconstruction (CNRT) of former president Xanana Gusmão, in the June 2007 parliamentary election. Despite this, Guterres' faction refused to leave Fretilin, and Alkatiri warned of legal action.

Although Fretilin won the most votes in the parliamentary election, the CNRT formed a coalition with other parties to hold a majority in parliament. In the government sworn in under Gusmão, who became Prime Minister, on August 8, 2007, Guterres became Deputy Prime Minister. Jose Luis Guterres, also commonly known as "LUGU" along with his group such as Jorge Teme (current Secretary State of Enclave Oecusse), attempted to register FRETILIN-Mudança as a political party broke up from Fretilin but then it was later rejected by the High Court of Timor-Leste due to its political attributes: even the name of the party was similar to the existing political party, Fretilin. Then, only few days later, as they were given chances to make any modification so that it could be legally registered, they changed FRETILIN-Mudança to FRENTI-Mudança. Then, the party was then approved by the high court of Timor-Leste.

In the 2012 parliamentary election, it won two seats in parliament. Guterres gave up his seat to become foreign minister in the new governing coalition headed by Xanana Gusmao, remaining in post until 2015, when he returned to parliament.

Guterres ran for the presidency in 2017 but finished a distant third with 2.6% of the vote. Frenti-Mudança then lost its parliamentary seats in the 2017 parliamentary election.
