= Fernanda Borges =

East Timorese politician

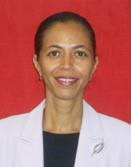
Fernanda Borges

Fernanda Borges (born 1969) is an East Timorese politician.

== Biography ==
Borges was born in East Timor. She received her Bachelor's of Commerce degree in Economics and MBA in Business law and PSM from both University of Wollongong and the University of New England. She was appointed Minister of Finance in 2001, under the Special Representative of the Secretary-General, Dr. Sergio Vieira de Mello for the United Nations Transitional Administration in East Timor. Before becoming Minister of Finance she had worked as commercial banker in Sydney, Australia and also was a Head of Finance, Budget and Economic Affairs and Special Assistant to the Deputy Special Representative of the Secretary-General.

In April 2002, Borges resigned as Minister as Finance. In 2005, she founded Partido Unidade Nacional (National Unity Party (East Timor)) and she was elected to parliament under its banner two years later. Due to her influence her party gained three seats in the parliamentary elections. She used to work at Superior Council of Defence and Security as a presidential advisor. Currently she is the Executive President of the GOPAC.
