= Association of Timorese Heroes =

Association of Timorese Heroes Klibur Oan Timor Asu'wain
- Founded: 20 November 1974
- Dissolved: 5 June 2017
- Ideology: National conservatism Cultural conservatism Monarchism
- Political position: Right-wing

Party flag
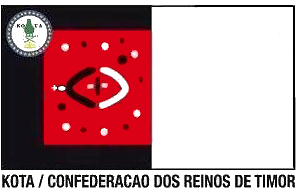

The Association of Timorese Heroes (Tetum: Klibur Oan Timor Asu'wain, KOTA; Portuguese: Associação dos Heróis Timorenses, AHT), sometimes known as Sons of the Mountain Warriors, was a culturally conservative political party in East Timor. In 2007, KOTA said it had 30,000 members.

== History and program ==
The party was founded in October 1974 as the Associacão Popular Monarqui(c)a de Timor APMT ( Popular Association of Timor Monarchists ) and was renamed to its current name on 20 November. The party set its position as an alternative between the western-oriented UDT and the left-wing FRETILIN. The colonial power Portugal did not recognize them as a party because they had too few supporters. Founders were Leão Pedro dos Reis Amaral, Pedro da Costa Ramalho and José Martins. 49-year-old Martins, who previously worked at APODETI became the first party president. In the party vice-presidency position was Francisco Ximenes, a Galoli speaker from Laleia. Secretary General Tomás Dias Ximenes also comes from Laleia. The KOTA found their support primarily among the Liurais, the traditional petty kings of Timor, but less so among the population. It remained more of a Liurais association until its demise 30 years later.

KOTA advocated an indirect electoral system, in which each tribe could elect a chief from among the men of a lineage. These bosses should then elect the representatives for Parliament from among their ranks, and these in turn the king. Most foreign observers are of the opinion that KOTA never had a chance to win popular support, only journalist Bill Nichol believed that they could certainly have won the majority with these ideas if they did not describe themselves as so incompetently portrayed and given airtime on the radio. On January 26, 1975, KOTA launched an election campaign in Dili with 10,000 participants.

José Martins was an Indonesian contact, and KOTA's pro-integration stance was used to legitimize its larger neighbor in the invasion of East Timor. In 1976, Martins fled the Indonesians under United Nations protection. KOTA later turned against the Indonesian occupation. From April 1998 she was a member of the CNRT, the umbrella organization of the East Timorese resistance. Augusto Pires represented KOTA on the CNRT Council. On August 11, 1998, the KOTA, like the other four old East Timor parties, rejected the Indonesian offer for limited autonomy and called for a referendum on East Timor's independence.

On August 30, 2000, KOTA was reorganized and realigned. Leão Pedro dos Reis Amaral was the official successor to the late José Martins. During the restoration of East Timor's independence, 83-year-old Leão Pedro dos Reis Amaral was already being replaced by his younger brother, Clementino dos Reis Amaral. In the Portuguese colonial period, Clementino dos Reis Amaral was district administrator of Baucau, later a member of the Indonesian Parliament for 14 years and a member of the Indonesian Human Rights Commission for seven years. Party spokesman was in again independent East Timor João Francisco dos Reis Amaral.

The KOTA now wanted to promote Timorese culture and traditions in connection with universal human rights, and strived for a stronger political and social role for the Liurais. The influence of western society and the declining prestige of the Liurais were deplored. The KOTA largely abandoned the goal of a monarchy and now supported the republican multi-party system, albeit with a stronger federal focus on the old empires of the country and a stronger role for the President. It is in favour of a form of federalism in which the country is organised and governed based on the traditional kingdoms, and also advocates for a union between East Timor and Indonesian West Timor. Whilst the party holds conservative beliefs in the cultural sphere, it is leaning left on social policy, implemented in 2017. This social policy was based on the program of the Portuguese Partido Socialista. A strong welfare system with a modern tax system should be created with a system of "four subsidies": for births, marriages, families and funerals. Poverty was to be combated by further developing agriculture, fisheries, tourism and coffee cultivation. During the discussion about the official national language, KOTA favored a promotion of Tetum. However, Portuguese, Bahasa Indonesia and English should be taught in school. The party had contacts in Macau, Australia and with Dom Duarte, the Duke of Braganza and the direct descendant of the last king of Portugal. As the only party in East Timor, KOTA emphasized greater cooperation specifically with West Timor to liberalize the movement of people and goods. In 2007, KOTA said it had 30,000 members. Secretary General Manuel Tilman named unification with the western part of the island as his project, since they were one nation, albeit not at that point in time. With this goal he was alone in East Timorese politics.

Due to a dispute over the party leadership, KOTA entered the 2012 election year weakened. Pedro da Costa Ramalho temporarily became party chairman in 2011. The internal power struggles escalated when Secretary General Tilman attempted to bring the party into an alliance with FRETILIN. Tilman prevailed, even though Ramailho demanded his resignation as general secretary in May 2011, as the majority of members no longer recognized Tilman. Ramalho accused Tilman of misusing party funds and never attending Central Committee meetings. Under the leadership of Ramalho, the Associação Popular Monarquia Timorense split off. Tilman now led the KOTA.

In April 2016, Tilman announced a collaboration with the PLP. KOTA disappeared from the list of registered parties until the parliamentary elections on July 22, 2017.

== Election results and parliamentary representation ==
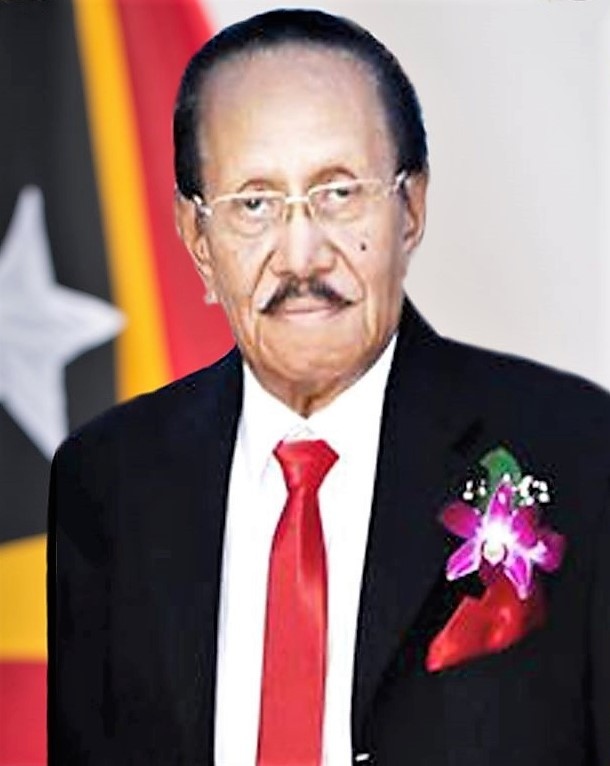
Clementino doe Reis Amaral (c. 2001)

In 1999, Clementino dos Reis Amaral was appointed as a representative of KOTA to the National Consultative Council (NCC), the predecessor of Parliament proper during the UN administration and later to its successor, the National Council.

In the parliamentary election held on 30 August 2001, the party won 2.1% of the popular vote and 2 out of 88 seats. According to provisional results, the party won together with the People's Party of Timor 3.20% of the vote in the June 2007 parliamentary election, and 2 seats.

In the 2007 presidential elections, Manuel Tilman was eliminated after the first round on April 9 with 4.09% of the votes. After all, he received the most votes in seven sucos in Ainaro thanks to the support of Jacob Xavier and his Partido do Povo de Timor (PPT). As the only losing candidate in the first round, Tilman recommended that his constituents vote for FRETILIN's Francisco Guterres in the second round, but he was defeated by the independent candidate José Ramos-Horta.

For the first post-independence parliamentary elections on June 30, 2007, KOTA drew up a joint electoral list with the PPT under the name Aliança Democratica KOTA/PPT . The Aliança Democratica KOTA/PPT finally received 13,294 votes, which is 3.20% of the valid votes. She found the greatest support in what was then Ainaro District, where she received 18.15% (4066 votes) of the vote and became the second strongest list. Allianz still received more than 3% of the votes in Aileu (5.60%). Manuel Tilman from the KOTA and Jacob Xavier from the PPT then moved into the national parliament of East Timor with 65 MPs for the alliance. The alliance was dissolved again after the election.

In the 2012 presidential election, Tilman ran again and received only 1.56% of the vote. In the 2012 general election, the KOTA formed a new Aliança Democrática together with the Partido Trabalhista (PTT). The PPT did not submit an election list to the electoral authorities. KOTA/PTT failed at the three percent hurdle. They received only 2,622 votes (0.56%). Even in the old stronghold of Ainaro, the Aliança Democrática received only 0.92% of the votes, which was the best result in a district.
