= Millennium Democratic Party (Timor-Leste) =

Centrist political party in East Timor

The Millennium Democratic Party (Tetum: Partido Milénio Democrático) is a centre-left political party in Timor-Leste (formerly East Timor) founded in July 2004 and registered on 30 December 2005. In the parliamentary election held on 30 June 2007, the party won 0.69% of the total votes and did not win any seats in parliament, as it did not reach the 3% threshold to win seats.
