= 2007 East Timorese parliamentary election =

- 30 June 2007
- All 65 seats in the National Parliament; 33 seats needed for a majority
- Turnout: 80.54%
Party	Leader	Vote %	Seats	+/–
Fretilin	Mari Alkatiri	29.02	21	−34
CNRT	Xanana Gusmão	24.10	18	New
PSD–ASDT	Xavier do Amaral	15.73	11	−1
Democratic	Fernando de Araújo	11.30	8	+1
PUN	Fernanda Borges	4.55	3	New
KOTA–PPT	Manuel Tilman	3.20	2	−2
UNDERTIM	Cornélio Gama	3.19	2	New
This lists parties that won seats. See the complete results below.
Most voted-for party by district
Prime Minister before	Prime Minister-designate
Estanislau da Silva; Fretilin	Xanana Gusmão; CNRT

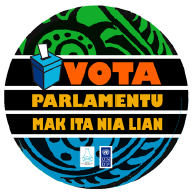
Button with a call to vote

Parliamentary elections were held in Timor-Leste on 30 June 2007. The new composition of Timor-Leste's national parliament was determined by the country's population. 529,198 voters were entitled to vote, 708 polling stations were ready.

As a result, 65 MPs sat in the new parliament for the next five years. Although a narrow plurality was achieved by Fretilin, a coalition involving the next three largest groups formed a government. New Prime Minister Xanana Gusmão (who was the nation's President until May 2007) of the National Congress for Timorese Reconstruction (CNRT) was sworn in on 8 August 2007; Fernando de Araújo of the Democratic Party became President of the National Parliament.

== Background ==
At the time of the parliamentary elections, Timor-Leste was the poorest country in Asia, with 41% of the population below the poverty line ($0.55 per day). Timor-Leste also ranked 142nd in the Human Development Index in 2006. The rich oil and gas deposits south of Timor are yet to be exploited. A treaty has been concluded with Australia on the sharing of the deposits.

At least 37 people died in the 2006 unrest, when nearly half the army mutinied and skirmishes broke out between the mutineers and the police. Looting, arson and fighting between youth gangs also took place, and ethnic conflicts erupted. Prime Minister Mari Alkatiri of Fretilin was eventually forced to resign. An international intervention force led by Australia restored peace and order, and a new United Nations police mission (UNMIT) was sent to Timor-Leste to provide security during the 2007 elections. Nevertheless, clashes between youth gangs and arson continue to occur. In addition, drought, pests and plant diseases reduced crop yields in 2007 and it was estimated that Timor-Leste would have to import 86,000 tons of food to make up for the losses, 15,000 tons of which would have to be raised through international food aid. One-fifth of the population relied on food aid.

One of the mutinous soldiers, Alfredo Reinado, and several companions broke out of a prison where they were serving time for unauthorized possession of weapons. In early March the fugitives were encircled in Same by the Australian army. Four rebels died in the storming of the town, while the others escaped. It was feared that the peaceful conduct of the elections would be endangered.

On 9 May 2007 independent candidate José Ramos-Horta won the presidential election runoff against Fretilin candidate Francisco Lu-Olo Guterres. Ramos-Horta was previously prime minister and is a close political friend of the previous president, Xanana Gusmão.

== Electoral system ==
East Timorese over the age of 17 were eligible to vote. The electoral system was based on proportional representation of parties according to their share of the nationwide vote. Parliament can have between 52 and 65 deputies. Only registered parties and electoral alliances were allowed to draw up lists of candidates, but individuals on the list did not have to belong to the party, allowing independent candidates to enter parliament. Under a new rule, at least a quarter of all persons on each list had to be women. In the previous parliament, without this quota, 22 of the 88 deputies were female. A total of 90 people had to be on a party list, with the final 25 candidates being replacements for any retiring deputies.

Also new was a three-percent hurdle, so that for the first time parties with a lower share of the vote could not enter parliament. Under these circumstances, only four of twelve parties would have been in parliament in the previous parliament. The D'Hondt method was used to determine the distribution of seats. The directly elected representatives of the 13 districts of Timor-Leste were no longer elected. Twelve of these seats had previously been held by Fretilin, and the 13th district representative was an independent candidate. The election campaign ran for 30 days, after which there were two days of rest before election day. In the new parliament, deputies are no longer allowed to change parties. If they wish to do so, they must return their mandate and it will be filled by a successor from the party list.

A week before the election, the ballots reached Timor-Leste by chartered plane accompanied by representatives of CNE and the electoral authority STAE (Secretáriado Técnico de Administração Eleitoral). 652,000 pieces were produced at a printing plant in Surabaya, Indonesia. Indonesian authorities supervised the production of the ballots. Before the ballots were sent out, they were packaged by STAE and UNMIT officials for onward distribution to the districts. The ballots are numbered consecutively with a serial number on a tear-off slip so that distribution can be better monitored. The reason for this was the irregularities during the presidential elections in the same year.

Vote counting was conducted differently due to a new law, according to which votes were to be counted at district counting centres, rather than at polling stations as they were formerly. It was required of parties that one out of every four candidates on their candidate lists be women.

== Campaign ==
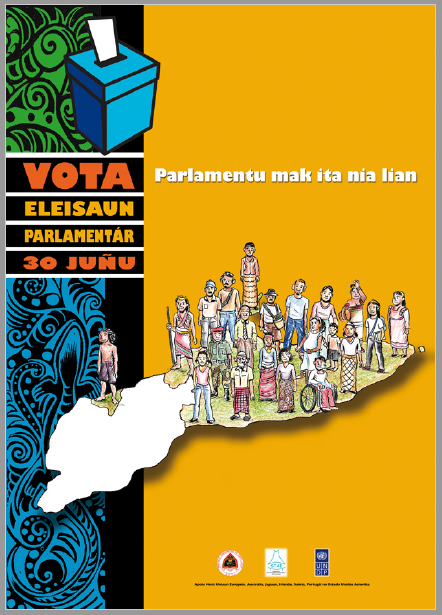
Info poster for the 2007 parliamentary election

Before the start of the election campaign, representatives of the participating parties signed a code of conduct in which they committed themselves to a fair, non-violent and democratic election campaign.

Former President Xanana Gusmão contested the elections with his newly founded National Congress for Timorese Reconstruction. Fourteen parties participated in the election for the 65 seats in parliament, conducted on the basis of proportional representation with party lists.

For the most part, the parties limited themselves to a personal campaign. They based their campaigns primarily on their leading candidates, and the opposition parties additionally criticized the previous governing party, Fretilin. Only the PST offered an ideologically elaborated program.

Pedro da Costa of the PST criticized that some parties give money to the voters. Calling the action as harming democracy. The call by the Diocese of Dili to all Christians to vote for the PUN was also criticized.

== Conduct ==
In early June, two supporters of the CNRT were killed in pre-election violence at the beginning of the campaign period; the rest of the campaign period was reportedly peaceful, however.

The start of the election campaign was overshadowed by some violent clashes. In Dili, one man was killed when a hand grenade exploded during gang fighting. Three others were injured. In Baucau, supporters of Fretilin and CNRT fought each other, and in the eastern district of Viqueque, supporters of a smaller party were beaten up while holding an election rally.

On 3 June an election rally of Xanana Gusmão was attacked in Viqueque. The five attackers were off-duty plainclothes police officers, according to UNMIT. CNRT member Alfonso "Kuda Lay" Guterres, 35, was hit three times by bullets and died. UN security forces dispersed the crowd with tear gas and warning shots. Gusmão was not injured, and according to UNMIT, he was probably not the target of the attack. When Guterres' body was taken to his hometown of Ossu that evening, 24-year-old CNRT member Domingus was shot dead, and a 16-year-old was injured. Again, according to President José Ramos-Horta, police officers were the perpetrators. Reasons for the attacks were not disclosed. The International Stabilisation Force (ISF) moved a unit to Viqueque, and the UN increased its security efforts for the election campaign. In October 2008 the Baucau District Court sentenced police officer Luis da Silva to six years in prison for killing Guterres.

On 27 June the election campaign ended with some violent incidents: Fretilin accused CNRT members of throwing stones at one of its convoys. Near Manatuto, police used tear gas against roadblockers. In Dili, clashes broke out between supporters of the various parties.

Overall, the United Nations called the election campaign peaceful. Atul Khare, the head of UNMIT, reported violent incidents at only four of the more than 150 election campaign events so far. From 28 May to 12 June the Election Violence Education and Resolution (EVER) program counted 34 cases of election-related violence, half of them during the first week of the campaign. Most of the incidents took place in Baucau, with four to five each in Oe-Cusse Ambeno, Ermera, Viqueque and Bobonaro. There were no incidents in four of the 13 districts.

=== Election day ===
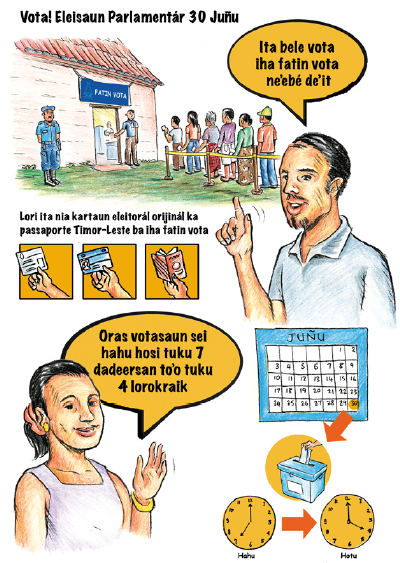
2007 Infographic poster showing how to vote on election day

705 of the 708 polling stations opened before 7:30 am. Mobile polling stations were used in hospitals and prisons. Due to the country's topography, ballots and ballot boxes were sometimes transported by helicopter, horseback or on foot, with late monsoon rains causing obstructions. At times, even the district capital of Suai was cut off from the outside world. Three localities in the district of Viqueque opened late because bad weather the day before meant that election documents could not be delivered here by helicopter until the morning. As usual, most Timorese cast their votes in the early morning hours. In some cases, queues had already formed in front of the polling stations before they opened. Voters were checked against their IDs and were marked with ink on their fingers after casting their ballots. The CNE registered some problems: some ballot stubs had been detached incorrectly, other ballots were missing the serial number or were stained, some minors attempted to vote, and some polling stations had party promotional materials. According to the CNE, these problems were fixed by the election workers and teams of the CNE and the STAE. 4,000 helpers were ready for the count.

The STAE found eight ballots in Balibo that had already been perforated before being issued, and in Metinaro a voter discovered several ballots that had already been marked. In Ainaro, a man tried to vote using his father's ID card after he had already cast his vote himself.

According to the STAE, the ballot proceeded largely peacefully, with some minor incidents: In one polling station in Ossu, voting had to be interrupted until police restored order and extended the opening time of the station. In Ermera, a man was arrested for appearing at the polling station armed with arrows. 426,190 voters cast their ballots. The ballot boxes were taken to the 13 counting centers in the district capitals, in some cases by helicopter, after voting had ended. In Dili, the count was delayed because the Fretilin wanted ten observers per party to be present during the count instead of the one allowed in each case. The CNE finally allowed these ten observers per party, contrary to the previous regulation.

== Results ==
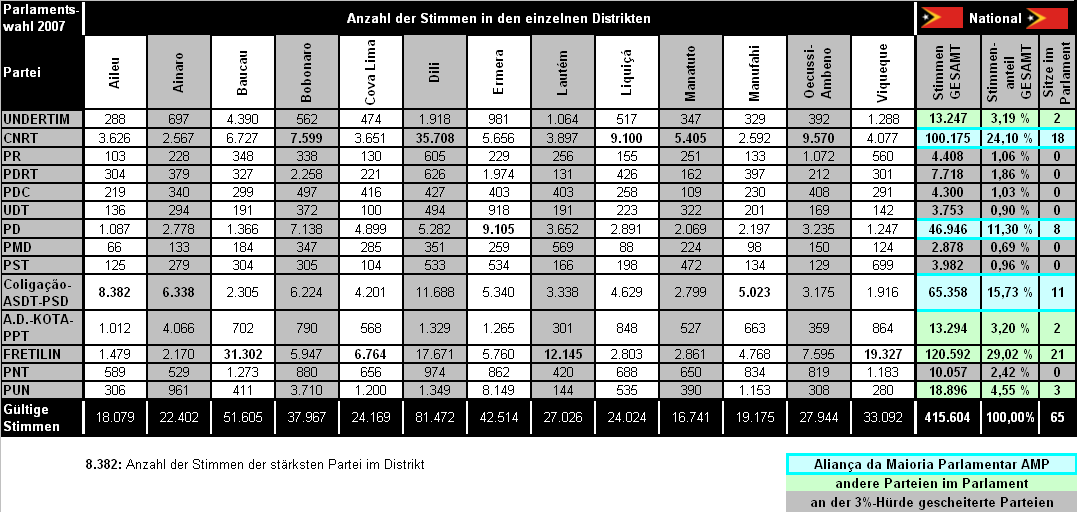
Result of the vote count by districts

Seven parties won seats; the four leading parties are the Fretilin, Gusmão's CNRT, a coalition of the Timorese Social Democratic Association and the Social Democratic Party, and the Democratic Party.

Provisional results announced on 9 July 2007, shows that Fretilin leads in first place with 29.02% of the vote, followed by the CNRT with 24.10%, the ASDT-PSD with 15.73%, and the Democratic Party with 11.30%. On the same day, the electoral commission announced the distribution of seats based on the provisional results: 21 for Fretilin, 18 for the CNRT, 11 for the ASDT-PSD, 8 for the Democratic Party, 3 for the National Unity Party, 2 for the Democratic Alliance, and 2 for UNDERTIM. To win seats, a party had to receive at least 3% of the vote, and seven parties did not reach this level. The electoral commission placed voter turnout at 80.5%.

The results in the individual districts showed a clear division in the country. While FRETILIN dominated in the east of the country (Loro Sae), the various opposition parties scored in the west (Loro Munu). FRETILIN was clearly the strongest party in Baucau with 62.44%, in Viqueque with 59.84% and in Lautém with 45.53%. In western Cova Lima, although it became the strongest party with 28.58%, it was nowhere near as clearly ahead of the others. The CNRT had its strongest support in the district of the state capital, Dili, with 45.23%, but was also the strongest force in the western districts of Liquiçá (38.96%), Oecussi-Ambeno (34.68%) and Bobonaro (20.56%). In Manatuto, the westernmost of the eastern districts, the CNRT also garnered the most votes (33.18%). The C-ASDT-PSD prevailed in the western highlands, becoming the strongest force in Aileu (47.30%), Ainaro (29.13%) and Manufahi (26.79%). The PD was the strongest party in western Ermera with 21.97%, but also in neighboring Bobonaro, where it was the second strongest party with 19.31%.

The final result of the count was officially confirmed by the Tribunal de Recurso de Timor-Leste (Timor-Leste's Court of Appeals) on 11 July. The 83 complaints concerning events during the election, eleven of which violated the law, had no effect on the result.

Party	Votes	%	Seats	+/–
Fretilin	120,592	29.02	21	–34
National Congress for Timorese Reconstruction	100,175	24.10	18	New
PSD–ASDT	65,358	15.73	11	–1
Democratic Party	46,946	11.30	8	+1
National Unity Party	18,896	4.55	3	New
Democratic Alliance (KOTA–PPT)	13,294	3.20	2	–2
National Unity of Timorese Resistance	13,247	3.19	2	New
Timorese Nationalist Party	10,057	2.42	0	–2
Democratic Republic of Timor-Leste Party	7,718	1.86	0	New
Republican Party	4,408	1.06	0	New
Christian Democratic Party	4,300	1.03	0	–2
Socialist Party of Timor	3,982	0.96	0	–1
Timorese Democratic Union	3,753	0.90	0	–2
Millennium Democratic Party	2,878	0.69	0	New
Total	415,604	100.00	65	–23
Valid votes	415,604	97.51		
Invalid/blank votes	10,606	2.49		
Total votes	426,210	100.00		
Registered voters/turnout	529,198	80.54		
Source: CNE

== Aftermath ==
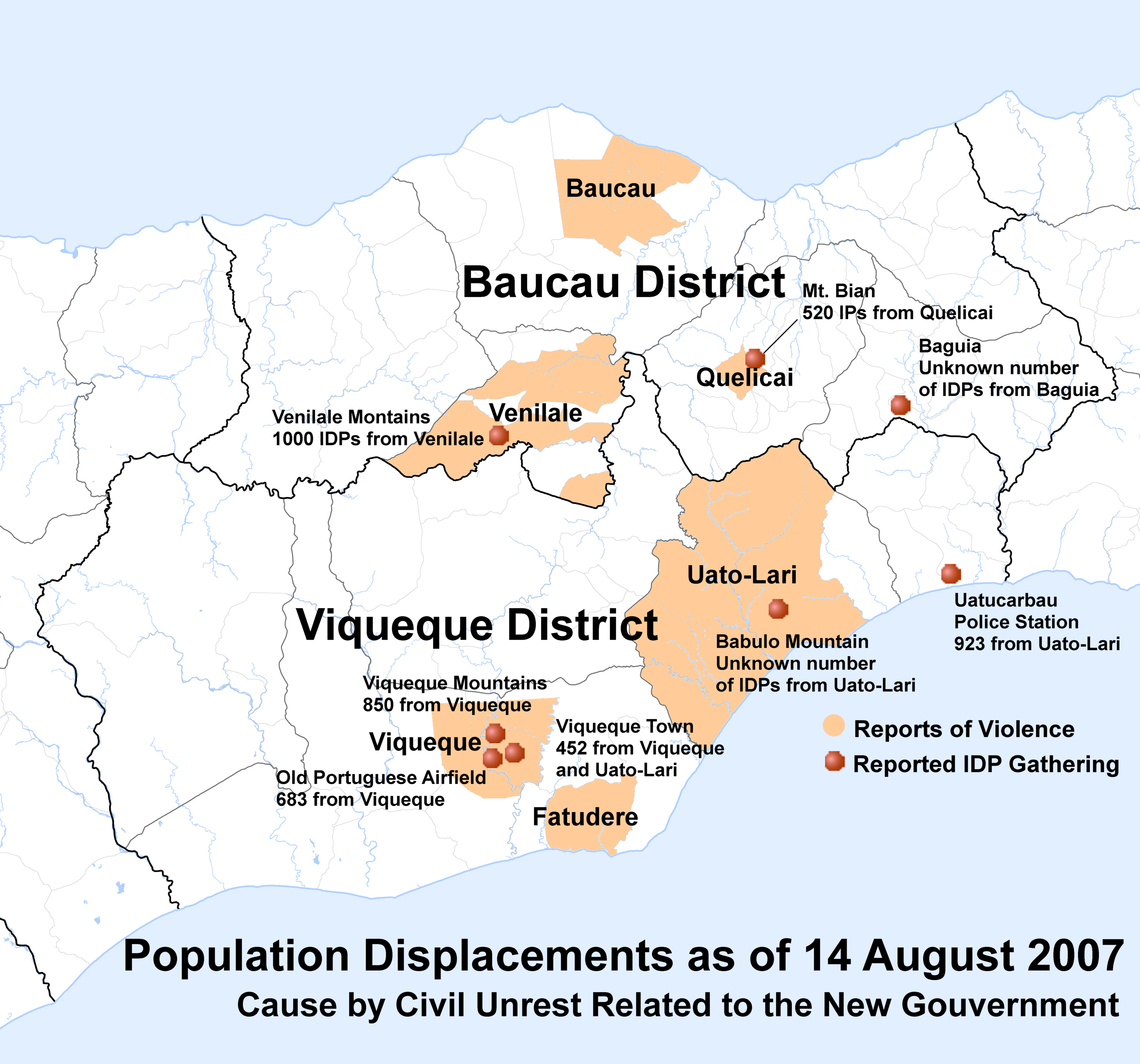
Population Displacements 2007 after announcement of new government

An estimated 600 houses and confirmed 142 were burnt by marauding mobs. The majority of the damage was experienced in the areas where Fretilin's support is strongest between Viqueque and Baucau. A few buildings in Dili were also torched. In Baucau, police said that over 50 people had been arrested for arson.

Alkatiri said that Fretilin would urge the people to protest and practice civil disobedience. He said that Fretilin was not responsible for the violence, which he said was the result of the people's frustration, and that he hoped the discontent did not lead to a "people's power" revolt, although he said Fretilin could not "stop the people protesting for their rights". Arsenio Bano of Fretilin claimed that his party had been willing to accept an independent prime minister as part of a national unity government, and that Ramos-Horta had also supported this idea, but that Gusmão rejected it because he wanted to be prime minister.

On 10 August, a convent in Baucau was attacked and damaged, and a number of female students at the convent were said to have been raped. The government said that a child had been killed in Viqueque, the first death to be reported in the unrest. On 11 August, a UN convoy of three vehicles was attacked between Baucau and Viqueque. According to Fretilin, this attack was the result of the destruction by members of the UN force of banners and flags used by protesters.

A few days later, Bano said that Fretilin would not challenge the government in court, and expressed a desire for a "political solution" leading to the creation of a national unity government. After initially boycotting parliament, the Fretilin members began attending later in August. Gusmão has reportedly offered Fretilin positions in the government though this probably refers to the ex-Fretilin members such as José Luís Guterres.

On 23 August, violence occurred in several places, including Dili, and two people were reported killed in Ermera. In Metinaro, near Dili, there was fighting in the streets with machetes and other weapons; at least ten houses were reportedly burned and the town's market was destroyed.

=== Government formation ===
With no party receiving a majority of the vote, a coalition government became necessary. Shortly after the election, a CNRT spokesman said that the party was discussing the possibility of forming a coalition with the ASDT-PSD and the Democratic Party. Fretilin secretary-general Mari Alkatiri also said his party was engaged in coalition talks, but said there was no possibility of the party forming a coalition with the CNRT. PSD leader Mario Viegas Carrascalao said that an alliance of his party with the CNRT would be "natural", but that the presence of a breakaway faction of Fretilin in the CNRT was "unacceptable". Democratic Party leader Fernando "Lasama" de Araújo said that his party could form a coalition with the CNRT, as there were "no big differences" between it and Gusmão, but also said that there should be a government of national unity including all parties elected to parliament; he argued that it would be harmful to exclude anyone due to what he described as deep differences already existing in the country. President José Ramos-Horta also mentioned the possibility of a national unity government, but Alkatiri, reiterating that a coalition including both Fretilin and the CNRT was out of the question, said that it would be better for democracy for there to be a strong opposition.

On 6 July, it was announced that the CNRT, the ASDT-PSD, and the Democratic Party would form a coalition. Alkatiri argued that it is not necessary for a party to have a majority of seats to govern, and that Fretilin could form a minority government; on 7 July, he said that Fretilin would do so if it could not form a coalition with other parties. However, he subsequently expressed interest in a government of national unity and said that Fretilin's doors were "open for all parties, including CNRT".

On 16 July, President Ramos-Horta said that Fretilin and the CNRT-led alliance of parties had agreed to form a national unity government, although details remained to be discussed and it had not been decided who would be prime minister. Negotiations between the parties began regarding the composition of the new government; Ramos-Horta said that he would make the decision if the parties could not reach an agreement. On 24 July, he said that the parties had "not yet reached agreement on a new government", but that his 25 July deadline for the parties to reach an agreement was "flexible". Araújo, as spokesman for the CNRT-led coalition, said that it would propose Gusmão as prime minister, arguing that, because the parties in the coalition will hold a combined majority of seats, it is their constitutional right to choose the prime minister. He said that Fretilin could not expect anything more than to have some ministers in the government.

Parliament was sworn in for its new term on 30 July, although the new government and prime minister were still undecided. Araújo was elected speaker of parliament at the new parliament's first session.

Alkatiri said on 1 August that he would be Fretilin's candidate for prime minister, while criticising Gusmão's record as president. Ramos-Horta delayed his deadline for forming a government until 3 August. In a statement, Alkatiri called for a national unity government, saying that this would bring stability and citing what he described as "the will of the electorate".

On 3 August, Ramos-Horta said that he would ask the CNRT-led coalition to form a government on 6 August, because of its parliamentary majority, unless an agreement is reached before then. He said that this decision was based on his conscience; he also said that, if Fretilin is excluded, it would still be needed by the new government and would not be ignored. Fretilin threatened to boycott parliament.

Ramos-Horta announced on 6 August that the CNRT-led coalition would form the government and that Gusmão would become prime minister. Fretilin denounced Ramos-Horta's decision as unconstitutional, and angry Fretilin supporters in Dili immediately reacted to Ramos-Horta's announcement with violent protests. On 7 August, Alkatiri said that the party would fight the decision through legal means.

Gusmão was sworn in at the presidential palace in Dili on 8 August; most of his government was also sworn in on the same day. José Luís Guterres, the leader of a dissident Fretilin faction, became deputy prime minister.
