= Democratic Republic of Timor Party =

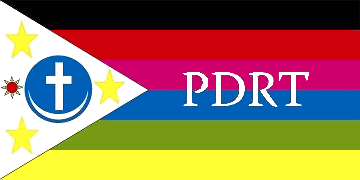
Flag of East Timorese party Partido Democrática Republica de Timor (PDRT)

The Timorese Democratic Republican Party (Portuguese: Partido Democratika Republica de Timor, PDRT) was a political party in Timor-Leste. In the parliamentary election held on 30 June 2007, the party won 1.86% of the vote and did not win any seats in parliament, as it did not reach the 4% threshold required to enter parliament to win seats.
