= National Unity of Timorese Resistance =

Political party

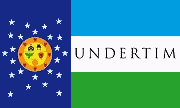
This is the flag confirmed after a deep search

The National Unity of Timorese Resistance (União Nacional Democrática de Resistência Timorense UNDERTIM) is a political party in East Timor founded in 2005. Cornelio Gama, a former FALINTIL commander and former member of the National Parliament, has served as the party's leader since its creation.

In the parliamentary election held on 30 June 2007, the party won 3.19% of the total votes and 2 seats in parliament. UNDERTIM chose to established its first headquarters in Bucoli, Baucau because of the role of the village in the history of the East Timorese resistance movement.
