= Manuel Carrascalão =

Indonesian Parliamentarian and a prominent East Timorese independence leader

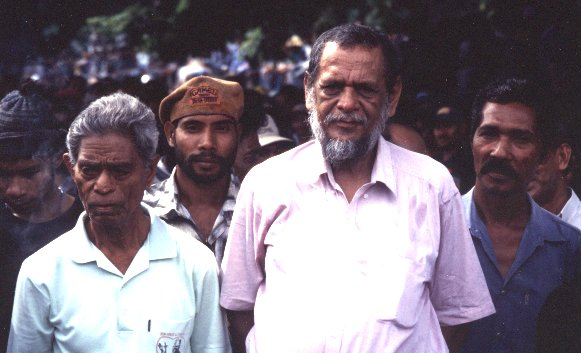
- Manuel Carrascalão, third from the left

Personal details
- Born: Manuel Guterres Viegas Carrascalão; 16 December 1933 Atauro, East Timor
- Died: 11 July 2009 (aged 75) Dili, East Timor
- Cause of death: Embolism
- Citizenship: Portugal; Indonesia; East Timor
- Parents: Manuel Viegas Carrascalão (father); Marcelina Guterres (mother)

Manuel Guterres Viegas Carrascalão (Atauro, 16 December 1933 – Dili, 11 July 2009) was an Indonesian parliamentarian and prominent East Timorese independence leader. The Carrascalão family is of mestiço ancestry;

On 22 May 1952, at the age of 18, he was made Knight of the Order of Entrepreneurial Merit.

He became one of the prominent figures in the popular self-determination consultation in 1999, to the point that his house was attacked by the Aitarack militias, under the command of Eurico Guterres, an opponent of Maubere independence. Twelve of the members killed during the massacre at his house were exhumed by the UNTAET Crime Scene Detachment in early 2000, in Maubara. Along with the Liquica Church Massacre, the attack at Manuel Carrascalão's house was of the "ten priority investigations" of the Serious Crimes Unit. During the attack at his residence in Lecidere, Dili, on 17 April 1999, his son Manelito Carrascalão, age 17, and a hundred other refugees, including women and children, were tortured and killed. The trial was heard by the Second Special Panel, composed of Judge Benfeito Mosso Ramos (Cape Verde) presiding, Judge Antero Luis (Portugal) and Judge Antonio Helder (East Timor).

Xanana Gusmão succeeded in the leadership of the National Council of Maubere Resistance, the Timorese independentist coalition. He had 11 brothers, the eldest, and among them were João Viegas Carrascalão, founder of the Timorese Democratic Union and presidential candidate in 2007, and Mário Viegas Carrascalão, who founded the Social Democratic Party.

He died at the age of 75, on 11 July 2009, at the Hospital Nacional Guido Valadares, in Dili, following a brain embolism.

== Manuel Carrascalão House massacre ==
The Manuel Carrascalão House massacre occurred on 17 April 1999 in Dili, East Timor, at the house of East Timorese independence leader Manuel Carrascalão. 12 people were killed by the pro-Indonesia Aitarak militia, commanded by Eurico Guterres, including Carrascalão's 17-year-old son Manelito, who was tortured and hacked to death. The bodies of the victims were transported to the village of Maubara, the headquarters of the Besi Merah Putih militia, where they were buried, in coffins, with personal possessions and identification. The bodies were exhumed in 2000, by the UNTAET Crime Scene Detachment.

After much deliberation, the Indonesian government agreed to allow Eurico Guterres to be extradited by the International Police, on the grounds that he be tried under Indonesian law rather than international law, and that he be allowed to carry out his sentence in Indonesia. In June 2002, Guterres went on trial. He was convicted, and received a ten-year prison sentence. He moved to Indonesia, where he was supposed to spend his sentence imprisoned. He has yet to be incarcerated, and has since started another militia group in Indonesia. Several other militia members were incarcerated for the crime.
