= Carrascalão =

Carrascalão (sometimes Carrascalao) is a surname of Portuguese origin for several personalities of Timor Leste / Indonesia, mainly politicians:

- Manuel Carrascalão or Manuel Viegas Carrascalão (1933–2009), Indonesian parliamentarian and independence leader
- João Carrascalão or João Viegas Carrascalão (1945–2012), founder president of the UDT who lived in exile, Minister of Infrastructure with the UNTAET (1999–2000) candidate in 2007 and later ambassador of East Timor to South Korea
- Mário Viegas Carrascalão, his brother, also politician of UDT but sided the Indonesian occupation as governor of Timor Timur between 1982 or 1987 and 1992, and founder of the PSD in 2000
- José Manuel Carrascalão, Vice-Minister of Infrastructure in the first government of Xanana Gusmão (2007–2012)
- Natália Carrascalão, chief-of-staff of Timorese president José Ramos-Horta during the 2008 East Timorese assassination attempts
- Rosa Horta Carrascalão, wife of João Viegas Carrascalão and sister of José Ramos-Horta
- Maria Ângela Guterres Viegas Carrascalão or Maria Ângela Carrascalão, East Timorese journalist, former Minister of Justice in the VII government of Francisco Guterres (2017–2018)
- Gabriela Carrascalão, Timorese journalist, executive producer and broadcaster/journalist at SBS melbourne, Head of UN/UnTAET-UNMISET-TVTL Television, advisor to Foreign Affairs Minister, advisor to President of Republic Taur Matan Ruak, also well known artist/painter and wife of Portuguese singer José Cid
- Sónia Dara Carrascalão, Indonesian actress nominated to the Citra Award for Best Leading Actress and Citra Award for Best Film in 1991
- Pedro Carrascalão, chairman of the Carsae FC of Dili

== See also ==
- Manuel Carrascalão House massacre in 1999 by Aitarak
- Carrascal
- Carrasco (surname)
