= Ai Pelo Prison =

19th century prison in East Timor

- Prisão do Ai Pelo
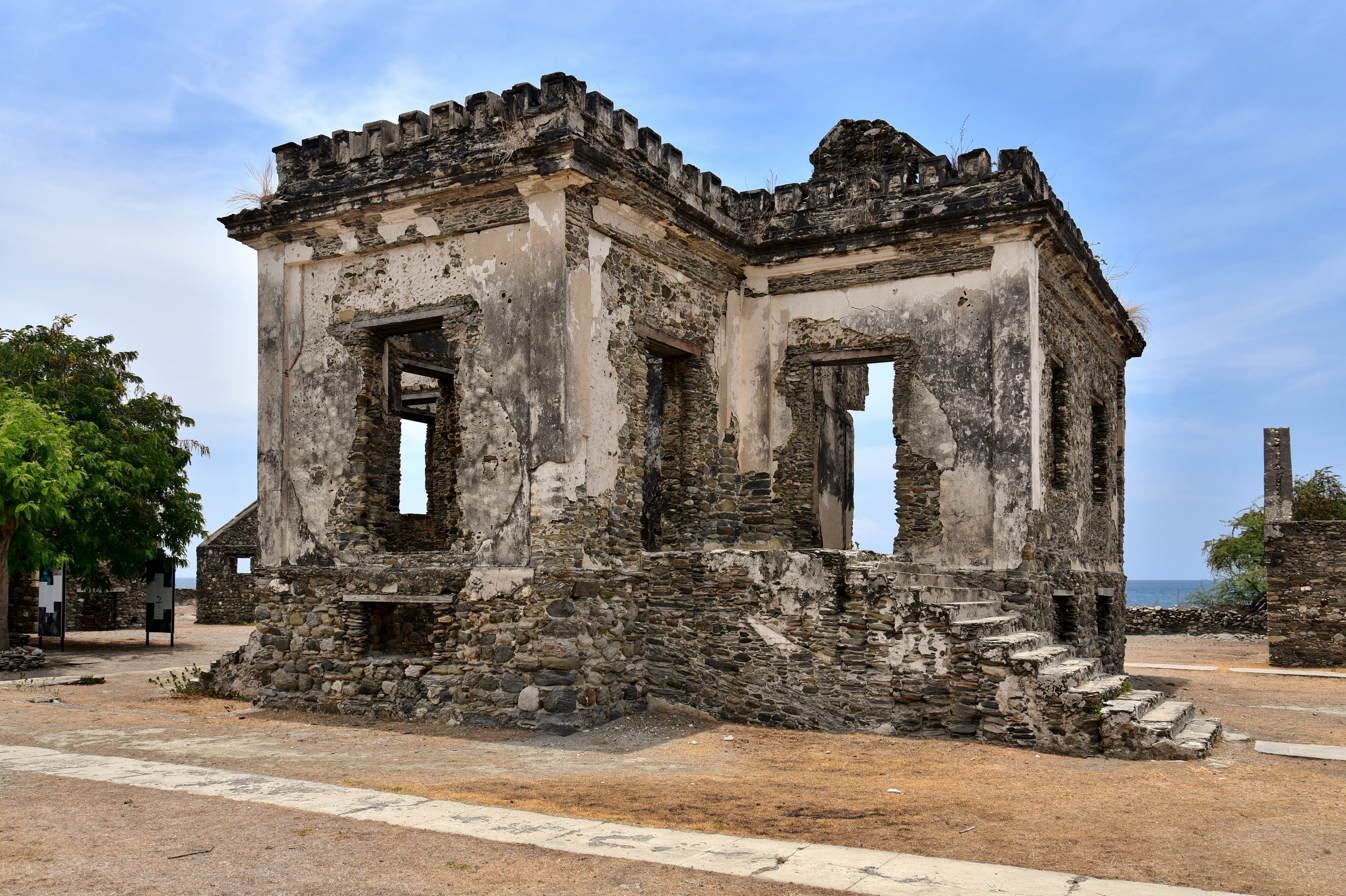
- Ai Pelo Prison, 2018

General information
- Type: Prison
- Architectural style: Portuguese colonial
- Location: Raucasa, Lauhata, Liquiçá Municipality, East Timor
- Coordinates: 8°34′11″S 125°22′53″E
- Completed: 1889
- Owner: Government of East Timor

Ai Pelo Prison or Aipelo Prison (Portuguese: Prisão do Ai Pelo / Aipelo, Tetun: Prizaun Ai Pelo / Aipelo) is an historic late nineteenth-century Portuguese colonial prison in the Lauhata suco, East Timor, adjacent to the Savu Sea. It was deactivated in 1939 and is now a ruin.

== Etymology ==
The expression Ai Pelo is apparently derived from the local Tocodede language word epelo, which means "bitter water" and was used by the inhabitants of a nearby village to refer to the prison. According to a museum label panel now located at the prison, the description "bitter water" was a clear allusion to the abuses inflicted there.

== History ==
Construction of Ai Pelo Prison began in 1889. In that year, the main building with administration and prison cells was built, along with the adjoining barracks for the soldiers stationed there. The building work was probably initiated by Governor António Francisco da Costa (in office 1887–1888). Two further buildings were constructed from 1914, to receive prisoners from Macau, where the prisons were overcrowded at that time.

The prison accommodated both common criminals and political prisoners. It also served as the administration headquarters and customs for the Portuguese colonial administration.

Ai Pelo detainees included civilians who refused to carry out forced labour or pay taxes. Governor José Celestino da Silva (in office 1894–1908) ordered that several Timorese Liurais be sent to Ai Pelo. Amongst the other prisoners held there was the Portuguese deportee Manuel Viegas Carrascalão, who was later released for good behaviour.

Prisoners were housed underground, submerged up to the knees in salt water from the nearby sea. Mistreatment is said to have been common practice, and included the mixing of broken glass with inmates' food.

The prison was deactivated in 1939. In that year, floods after heavy rains in Dili and Liquiçá claimed human lives and damaged infrastructure, including the prison.

During World War II, both Australian and Japanese bombs fell on the prison. Following the Japanese invasion of Portuguese Timor in 1942, the prison buildings that had weathered the heavy rains were converted by the Japanese into a command post. After World War II ended, the damaged buildings were not restored.

In May 2012, to coincide with the 10th anniversary of the restoration of East Timorese independence, and the centenary of the Manufahi Wars, the Secretary of State for Culture launched a restoration project aimed at converting the ruins of Ai Pelo Prison into a museum. During that year, a temporary exhibition on the history of the building was developed and installed. The plans for the project included the construction of a small museum, a venue for selling local products and a restaurant and coffee shop.

== Architecture ==
The prison's original set of buildings is a typical example of Portuguese colonial architecture of the late nineteenth and early twentieth centuries. The main building was constructed in a neoclassical and heavy style. The prison complex as a whole is now appreciated for both its historical and patrimonial value, and is regarded as an element of East Timor's national identity and union.
