= CNRT =

CNRT may refer to:

- Conselho Nacional de Reconstrução de Timor, a political party in East Timor
- Conselho Nacional de Resistência Timorense, an umbrella movement that was dedicated to resisting the Indonesian occupation of East Timor
