= Manuel Viegas Carrascalão =

Portuguese anarchist (1901–1977)

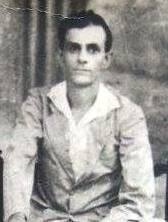
- Born: 24 October 1901; São Brás de Alportel, Portugal
- Died: 24 October 1977 (aged 76); Lisbon, Portugal
- Children: Dora Viegas Carrascalão; Maria Viegas Carrascalão da Silva; Ermelinda Viegas Carrascalão; Manuel Carrascalão; Mário Viegas Carrascalão; Artur Eduardo Viegas Carrascalão; Alice Viegas Carrascalão; João Viegas Carrascalão; Francisco Viegas Carrascalão; Maria Gabriela Carrascalão; Maria Ângela Carrascalão; Natália Carrascalão
- Parents: Manuel Viegas Carrascalão (father); Maria Faustina Cavaco (mother)

Manuel Viegas Carrascalão (24 October 1901 – 24 October 1977) was a Portuguese journalist and trade union leader.

== Biography ==
Manuel Viegas Carrascalão was born on 24 October 1901 to Manuel Viegas Carrascalão and Maria Faustina Cavaco.

On 14 April 1927 Carrascalão was deported to Portuguese Timor with 63 others on board the Pêro de Alenquer. The trip took them to Cape Verde, Portuguese Guinea (where some prisoners landed) and Mozambique. Upon his arrival in Timor on 25 September 1927 Carrascalão was arrested in Aipelo prison but released in 1928 owing to good behaviour. Carrascalão founded the Commercial, Agricultural and Industrial Association of Timor (ACAIT) in 1953.

In 1975, Carrascalão had to travel to Portugal for medical treatment because he had lung cancer. The Carnation Revolution had overthrown the dictatorship and Timor-Leste was preparing for independence. He died in Lisbon, Portugal, on his 76th birthday on 24 October 1977. His sons Manuel, Mário and João founded the Timorese Democratic Union (UDT), which competed with Fretilin for political leadership. The UDT tried to take power in a coup but was defeated in the short civil war with Fretilin. The three brothers had to flee to Indonesian West Timor. On 28 November Fretilin unilaterally proclaimed the independence of Timor-Leste. On 7 December, Indonesia began an open invasion of Timor-Leste, citing an alleged request for help from UDT.
