= Karl Clark =

Karl Clark may refer to:

- Karl Clark (police officer)
- Karl Clark (chemist)
