= Moisés da Costa Amaral =

East Timorese politician

Moisés da Costa Amaral (19 May 1938 – 22 February 1989) was an East Timorese politician in the Timorese Democratic Union. Born in 1938 in Fahinihan, East Timor.

Moisés da Costa Amaral was an East Timorese leader. Since 1975 until his death, he was the President of the political commission of the Timorese Democratic Union.

Moisés da Costa Amaral was married and had one child.

On March 31, 1986, Moisés da Costa Amaral, as the UDT leader signed the terms of the formation of the Nationalist Convergence with Fretilin, an important and necessary step in defense of the right to the self-determination of the people of East Timor.

On August 12, 1988, and after several years of diplomatic struggle, finally a Timorese delegation had the opportunity to defend the right to the self-determination of the Timorese people within the United Nations. Moisés da Costa Amaral made the statement representing the nationalist convergence, a delegation composed also by Monsignor Martinho Lopes, apostolic administrator of Dili, Roque Rodrigues representing Fretilin and João Carrascalão representing UDT. Within the United Nations this was the first big step that led to the so desired independence of the Democratic Republic of Timor-Leste.
