= Bazartete Administrative Post =

Administrative post in Liquiçá Municipality, Timor-Leste

Bazartete
- Administrative Post
- Posto Administrativo de Bazartete (Portuguese); Postu administrativu Bazartete (Tetum)
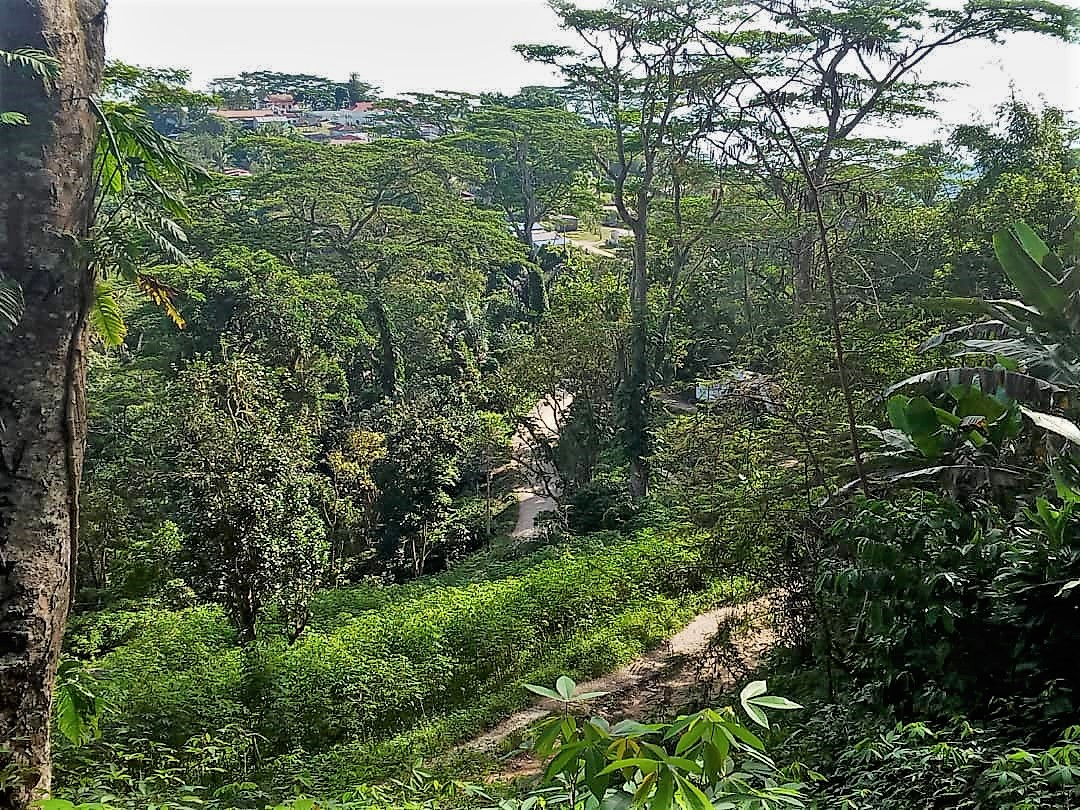
- Bazertete landscape

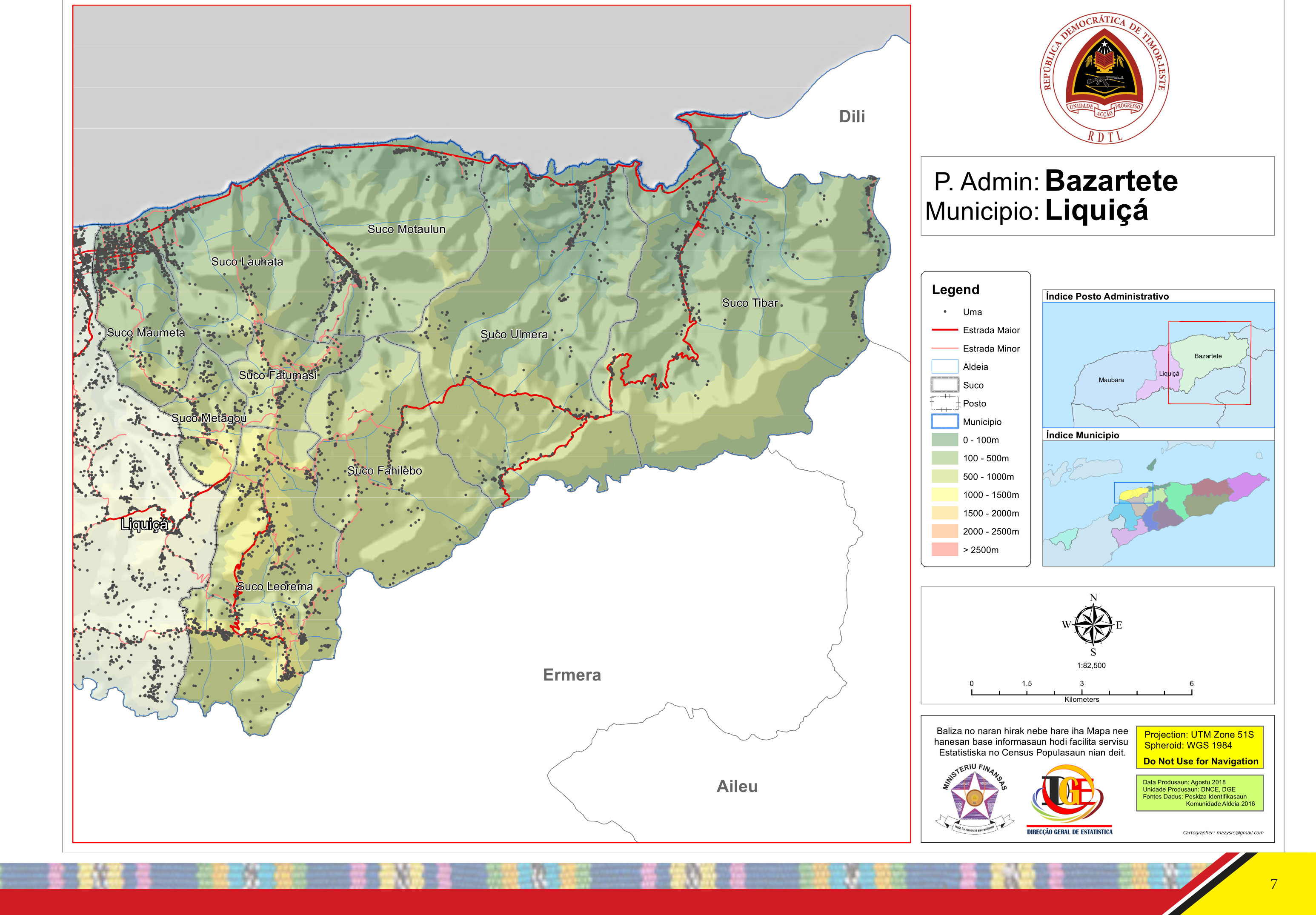
- Official map

- Location within East Timor
- Coordinates: 8°37′S 125°23′E
- Country: Timor-Leste
- Municipality: Liquiçá
- Seat: Fatumasi
- Sucos: Fahilebo; Fatumasi; Lauhata; Leorema; Maumeta; Metagou; Motaulun; Tibar; Ulmera

Area
  - Total: 197.0 km^{2} (76.1 sq mi)

Population (2015 census)
  - Total: 27,879
  - Density: 141.5/km^{2} (366.5/sq mi)

Households (2015 census)
  - Total: 4,585
- Time zone: UTC+09:00 (TLT)

Bazartete, officially Bazartete Administrative Post (Portuguese: Posto Administrativo de Bazartete, Tetum: Postu administrativu Bazartete), is an administrative post (and was formerly a subdistrict) in Liquiçá municipality, Timor-Leste. Its seat or administrative centre is Fatumasi.
