= Natália Carrascalão =

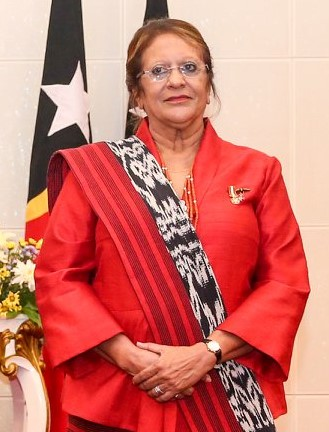
- Carrascalão in 2020

East Timorese Ambassador to Singapore
- In office 2020–2024

East Timorese Ambassador to Laos
- In office 2016–2020

East Timorese Ambassador to Portugal
- In office 2009–2014

Member of the Assembly of the Republic (Portugal)
- In office 1999–2009

Personal details
- Born: 24 December 1952 (age 73)
- Party: Social Democratic Party (Portugal) (PSD)
- Parent: Manuel Viegas Carrascalão (father)

Maria Natália Guterres Viegas Carrascalão da Conceição Antunes (born 24 December 1952) is a former Portuguese politician, and is currently an East Timorese diplomat. In 2020, she has been the East Timorese Ambassador to Singapore, a post held since 2024 by Alex Tilman.

Earlier, from 1999 to 2009, she was a Social Democratic Party (PSD) member of the Assembly of the Republic, the unicameral parliament of Portugal. Between 2009 and 2014, she was the East Timorese Ambassador to Portugal, and was also accredited to Spain and Cape Verde. From 2016 until 2020, she was East Timorese Ambassador to Laos.

Carrascalão is one of the 14 children born to Portuguese exile Manuel Viegas Carrascalão and his Timorese wife Marcelina Guterres; several of the Carrascalão children, and their father, have played important political roles in East Timor since their father arrived there as a political prisoner in 1927.
