= Liquiçá Municipality =

Municipality of East Timor

Liquiçá
- Municipality of Timor-Leste
- Município Liquiçá (Portuguese); Munisípiu Likisá (Tetun)
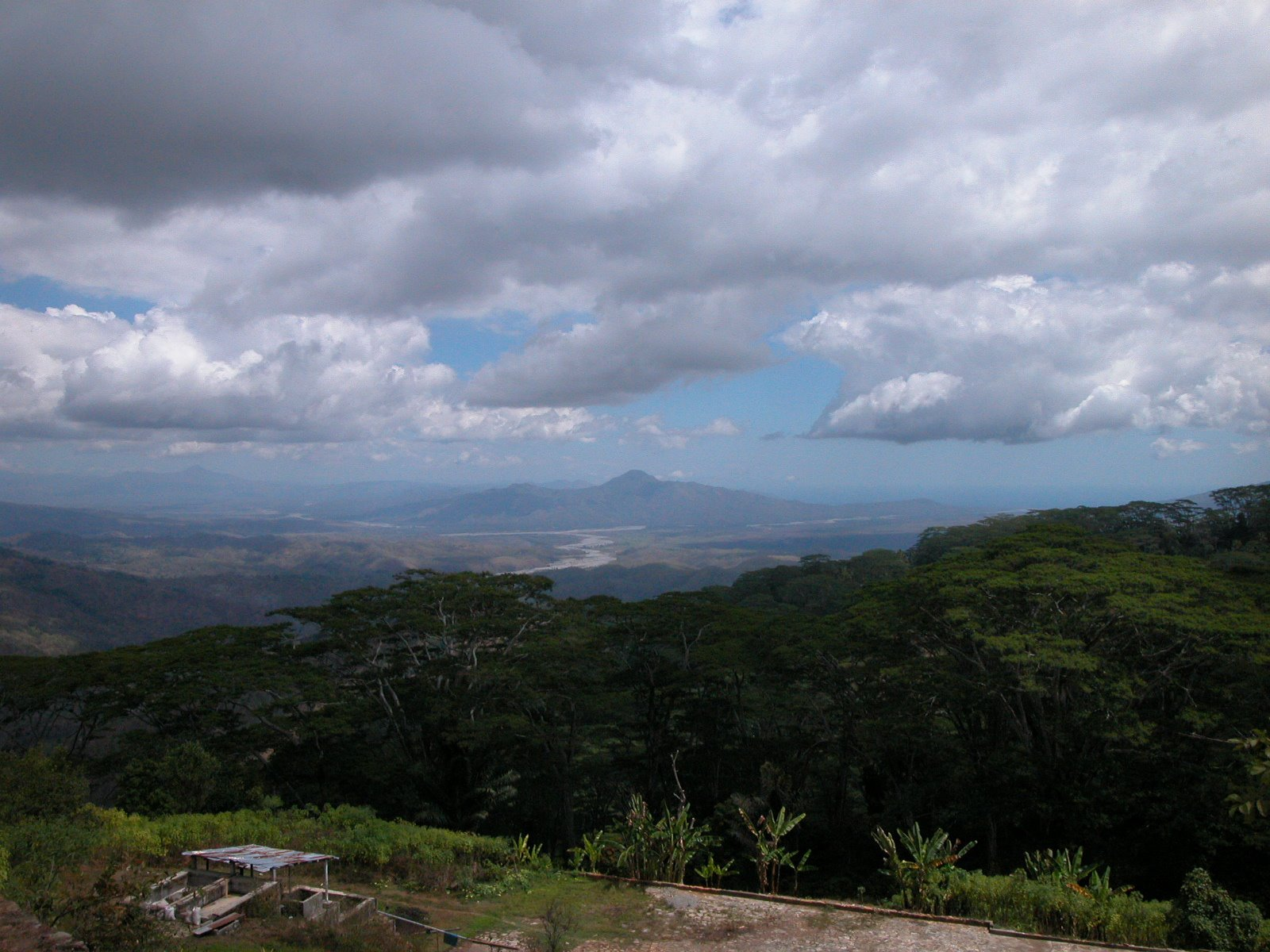
- Fazenda Algarve in Liquiçá

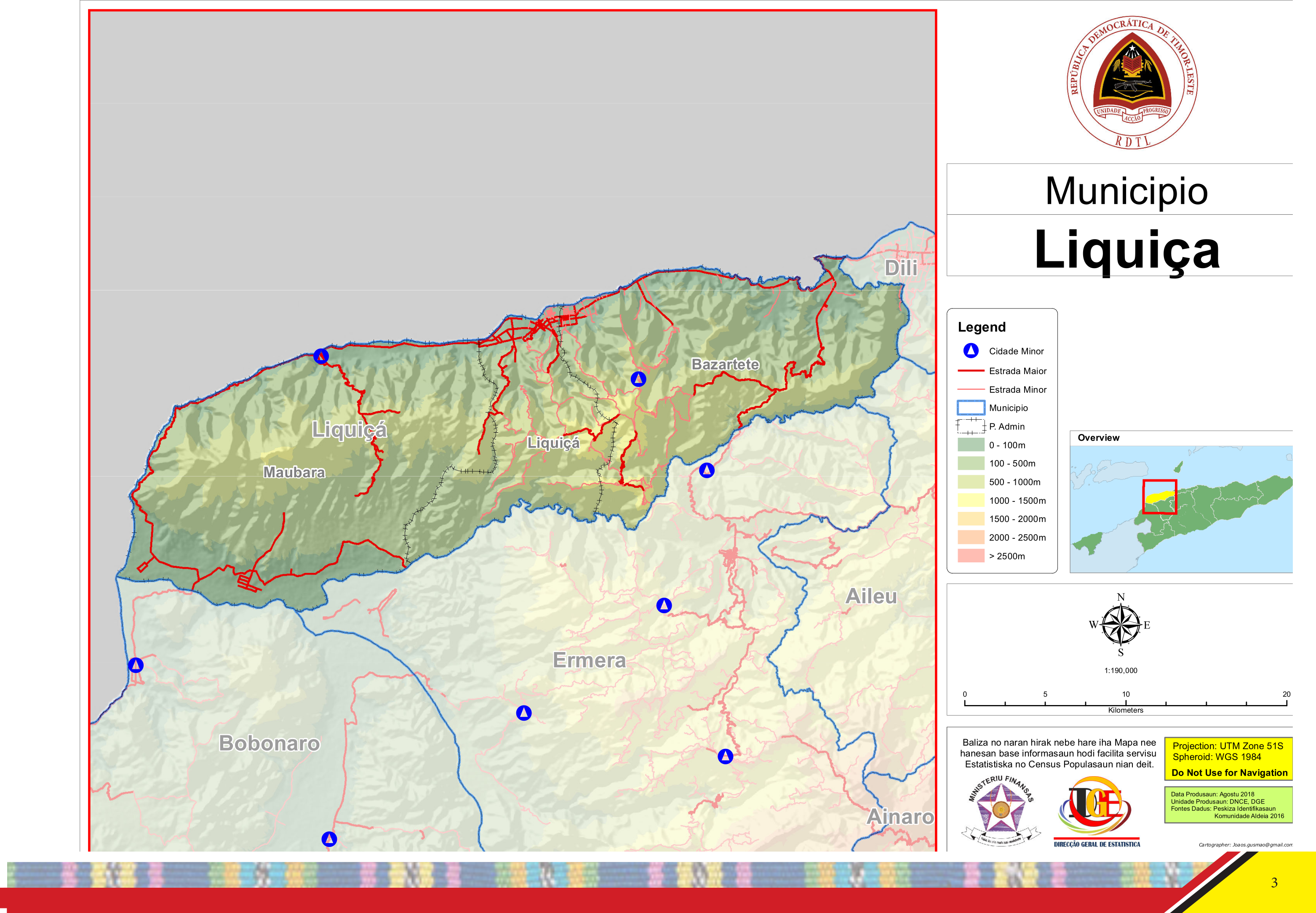
- Official map

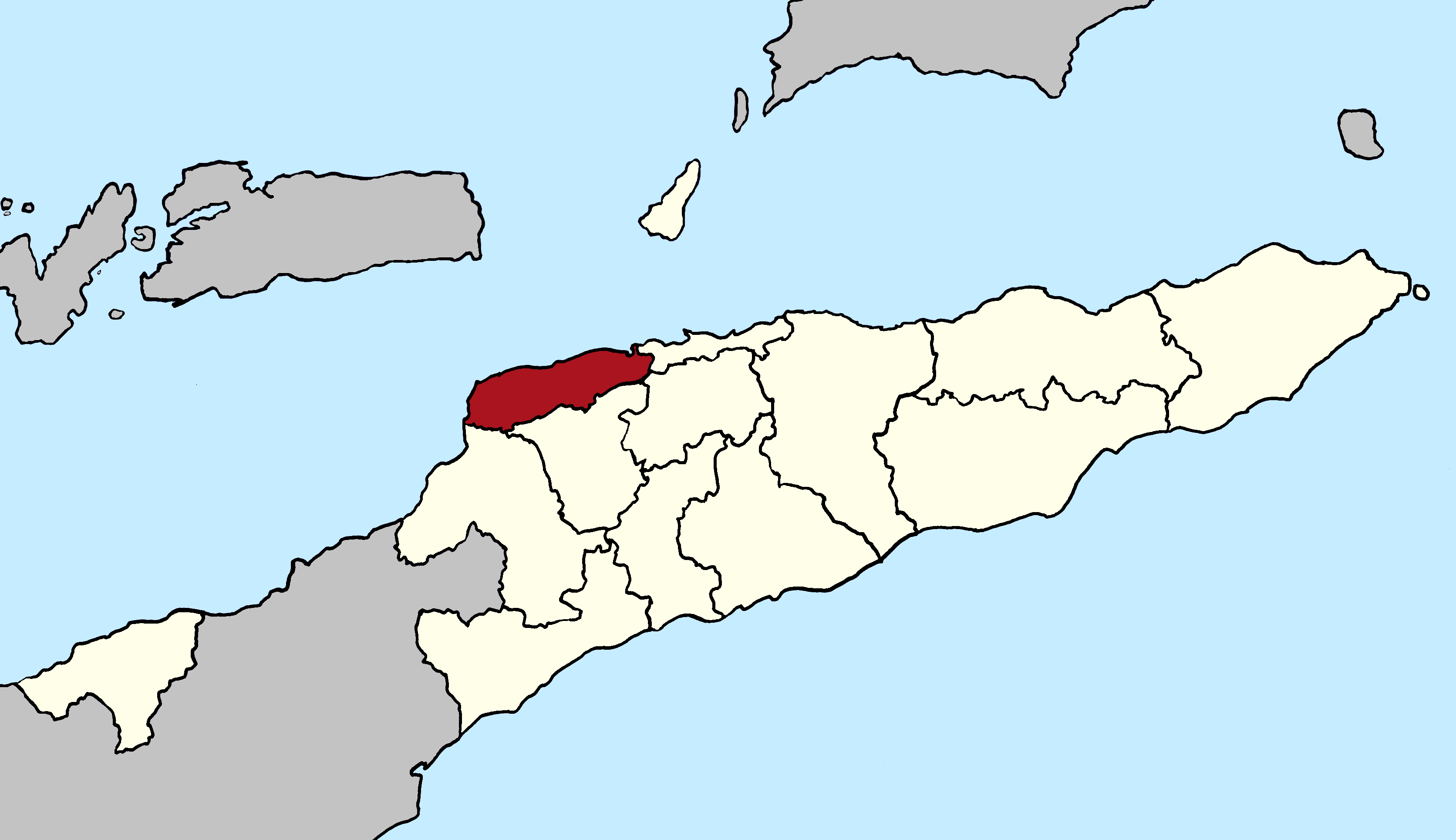
- Liquiçá in Timor-Leste
- Interactive map of Liquiçá
- Coordinates: 8°41′S 125°12′E
- Country: Timor-Leste
- Capital: Liquiçá
- Administrative posts: Bazartete; Liquiçá; Maubara

Area
  - Total: 559.9 km^{2} (216.2 sq mi)
  - Rank: 12th

Population (2015 census)
  - Total: 71,927
  - Rank: 8th
  - Density: 128.5/km^{2} (332.7/sq mi)
  - Rank: 3rd

Households (2015 census)
  - Total: 11,885
  - Rank: 10th
- Time zone: UTC+09:00 (TLT)
- ISO 3166 code: TL-LI
- HDI (2017): 0.636 medium · 2nd
- Website: Liquiçá Municipality

Liquiçá (Portuguese: Município Liquiçá, Tetun: Munisípiu Likisá) is one of the municipalities (formerly districts) of Timor-Leste. Its capital is also called Liquiçá.

== Toponymy ==
The English language version of the municipality's name has been said to be a Portuguese approximation of the old name Liku Saen, or its corresponding portmanteau Likusaen, each of which means 'python' in the local Tokodede language.

Another theory points to the Tokodede expression Likis Aá, meaning 'motion' or 'change', referring to an incident during the founding of the city of Vila de Liquiçá. After the Portuguese had chosen the settlement site, people started clearing the forest there and turning it into an open space. The Portuguese then asked the local people to tell them the name of the area. The local people did not understand the question, and so the Portuguese tried to communicate with gestures by moving their hands back and forth. The local people then responded with the expression Likis Aá, that is, 'moving' or 'changing'.

Additionally, it has been asserted that the Portuguese version of the name may be a "... form of cultural and mind de-colonization ..." [sic - colonization] of the local name that changes the indigenous cultural meanings and history.

== Geography ==
Liquiçá municipality is situated on the northern coast of Timor-Leste, and borders the municipalities of Dili (containing the national capital) to the east, Aileu to the Southeast, Ermera to the south, and Bobonaro to the southwest. To the northwest lies the Savu Sea. The municipality has a population of 73,027 (Census 2010) and an area of 549 km^{2}. The borders of the municipality are identical to those of the district of the same name in Portuguese Timor. Its administrative posts are Bazartete, Liquiçá and Maubara.

Widely known as a scenic location, it has a view of the Ombai Strait, which is most visible as you drive into Liquiçá from Dili, rounding the last mountain curve before descending into the valley. The beaches are rocky, as are most beaches on Timor-Leste. The river that flows down to the sea from the mountains is dry, except during the monsoon season. During this time, the main road washes out several times, and is repaired each time by the local population. There are large population of mosquitoes which carry both the deadly diseases malaria and dengue fever.

Vatuvou village in Liquiçá has been reported as part of a north-west marine protected area initiative supported by the Ministry of Agriculture, Livestock, Fisheries and Forestry and Conservation International Timor-Leste.

== History ==
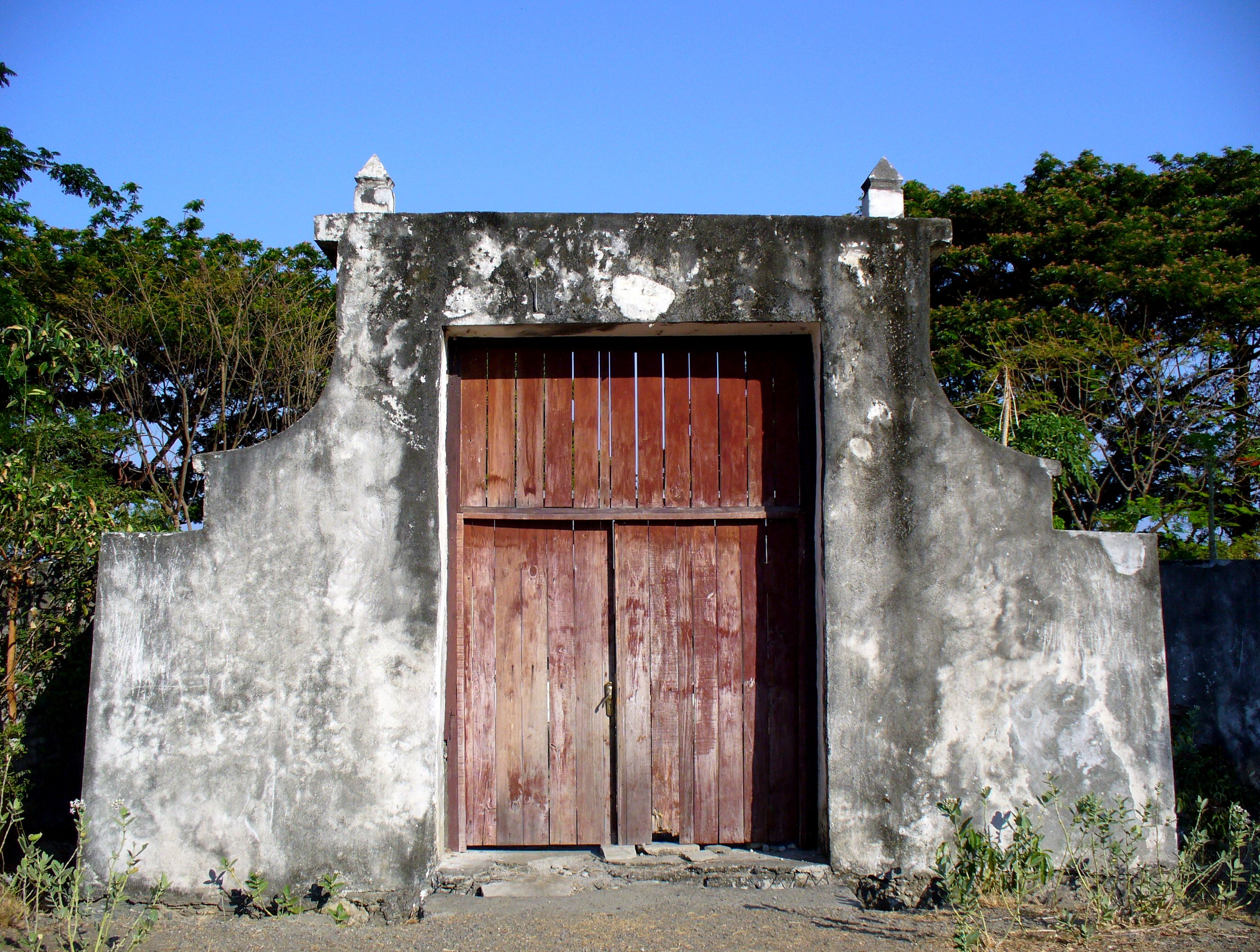
Fort of Maubara

During the Portuguese colonisation of eastern Timor, the Maubara kingdom, in the west of today's Liquiçá municipality, was taken by the Netherlands in 1667, while surrounding territories felt under Portuguese domination. The Maubara Dutch fortification near the beach is well preserved and still has the original cannon that once overlooked the bay. Later, Portugal negotiated with the Netherlands in 1859 and exchanged Maubara for Flores Island in 1861.

According to a list prepared by Afonso de Castro, governor of the colony of Portuguese Timor from 1859 to 1863, Liquiçá was one of 47 kingdoms in that colony at the time.

During the Indonesian occupation, the Indonesian government did construct many buildings in Liquiçá, but after the referendum of 1999 and during the militia's campaign almost everything was destroyed. Most notably, many East Timorese were murdered during the Liquiçá Church Massacre of April 1999. Maubara is the location where the dreaded militia group Besi Merah Putih was first formed. In September 1999 an American police officer serving with the International Police was shot (though not fatally) by pro-Indonesian forces while the UN was evacuating Liquiçá.

From September through November 1999, life came back to Liquiçá, as UN Peace Keeping Forces from Portugal set up a base in Maubara, and the International Police set up its headquarters in downtown Liquiçá. Originally, there were 14 International Police assigned to Liquiçá, representing Sweden, Canada, Great Britain, Ghana, Malaysia, and the United States. It was in Liquiçá that the first International Police officer for the Timor-Leste mission died, as a result of contracting dengue fever; he was from Ghana. During this period, the International Police occupied the very same church compound location where the Liquiçá Church Massacre had played out. The peacekeeper military element for Liquiçá were Portuguese Marines. Liquica was also the main base of operations for the UNTAET Crime Scene Detachment.

== Administrative posts ==
The municipality's administrative posts (formerly sub-districts) are:

- Bazartete
- Maubara
- Liquiçá
- Loes

The administrative posts are divided into 23 sucos ("villages") in total.

== Demographics ==
In addition to the national official languages of Tetum and Portuguese, nearly all of the inhabitants of Liquiçá speak the Malayo-Polynesian language Tocodede.

== Places of interest ==
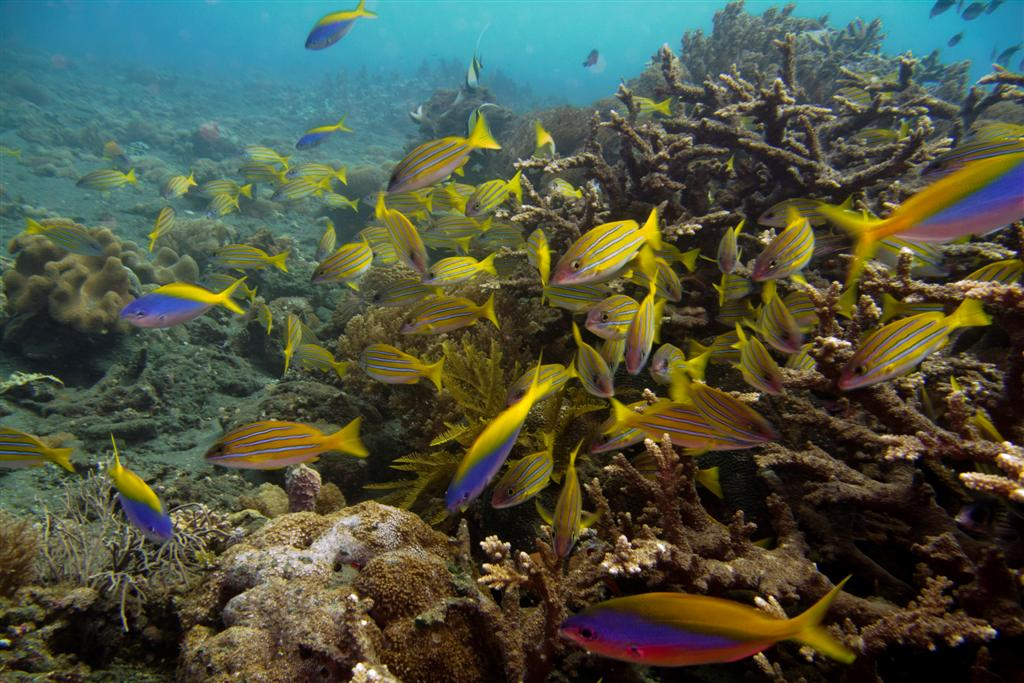
Fusilier fish in Maubara

Liquiçá has beautiful beaches (although no white sands) that are very attractive for tourism. Liquiçá also has coffee plantations and some minerals such as gold. Several diving spots scatter along the coast.

== Infrastructure ==
During the Portuguese occupation, there were very few buildings other than the traditional huts used by local East Timorese. Most of the buildings were constructed during the Indonesian occupation, but most of them were destroyed during the militia riots and violent onslaughts following and leading up to the referendum in 1999. Some of the buildings that still remain intact are the Portuguese buildings. Many of the Indonesian buildings were repairable. The construction and design is a traditional Indonesian style, which is both out dated, yet artistic and creative.
