= Maubara Administrative Post =

Administrative post in Liquiçá Municipality, Timor-Leste

Maubara
- Administrative Post
- Posto Administrativo de Maubara (Portuguese); Postu administrativu Maubara (Tetum)
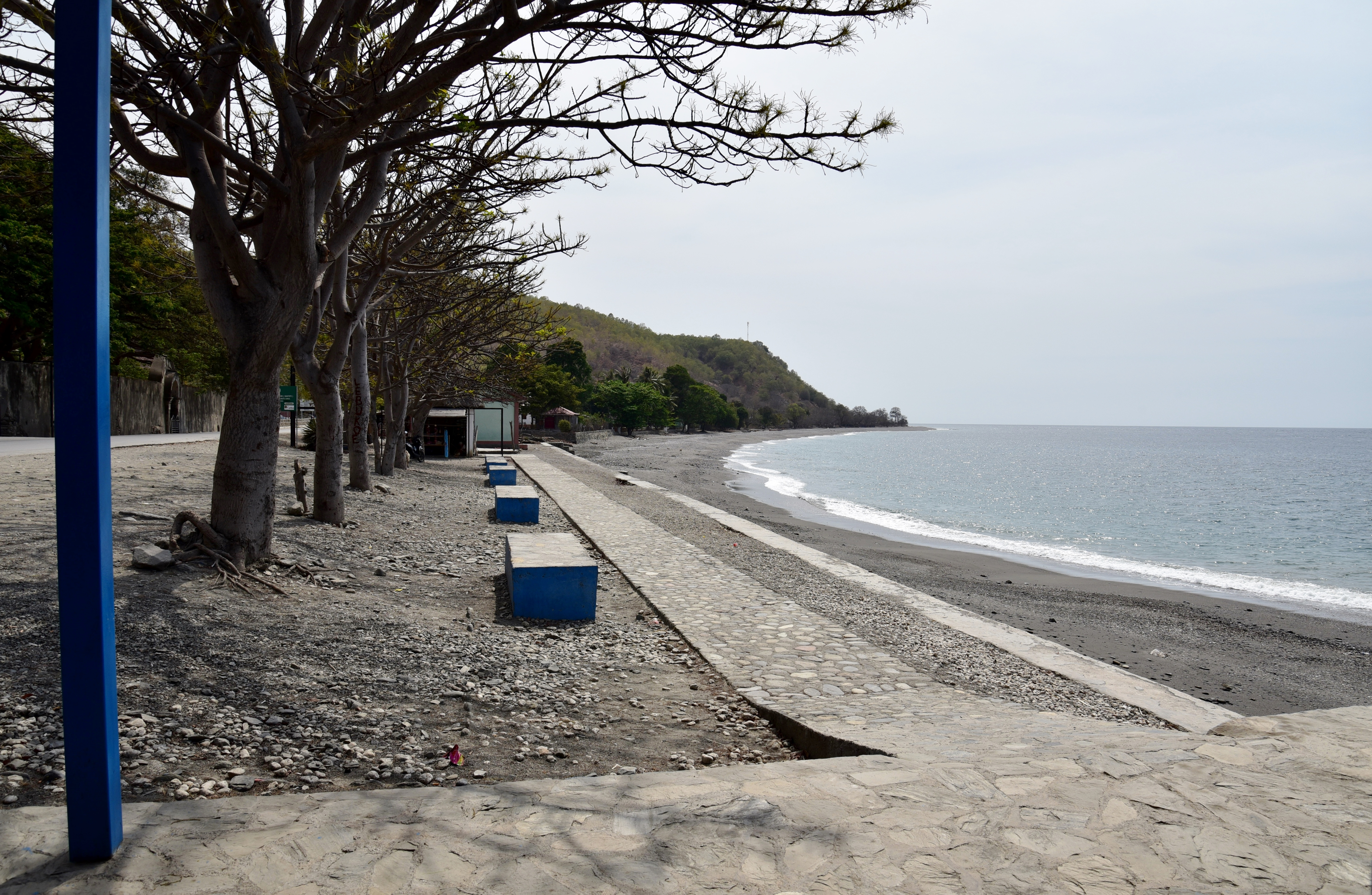
- Maubara Beach

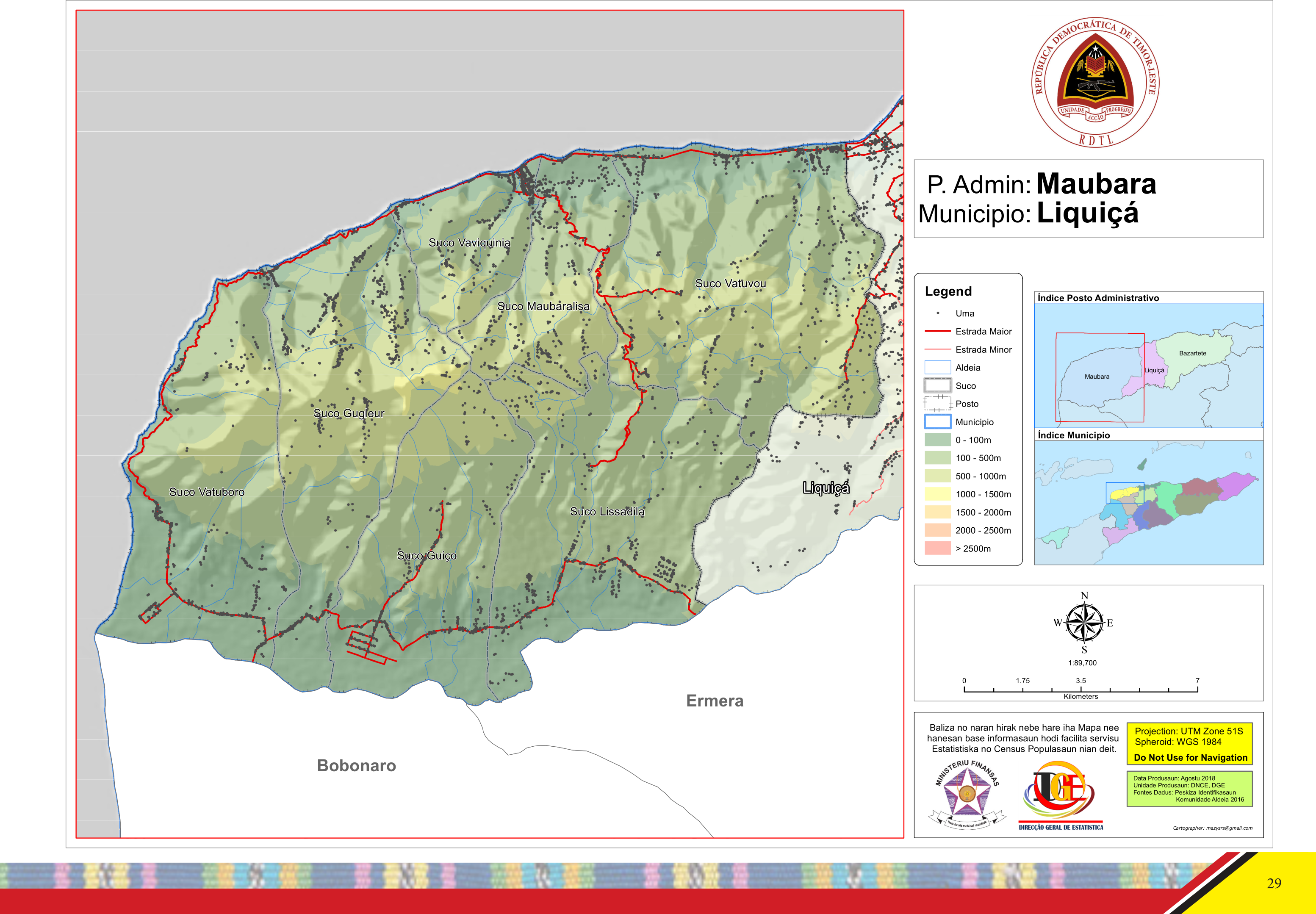
- Official map

- Location within East Timor
- Coordinates: 8°37′S 125°12′E
- Country: Timor-Leste
- Municipality: Liquiçá
- Seat: Vaviquinia
- Sucos: Gugleur; Guiço; Lissadila; Maubaralissa; Vatuboro; Vatuvou; Vaviquinia

Area
  - Total: 269.0 km^{2} (103.9 sq mi)

Population (2015 census)
  - Total: 21,920
  - Density: 81.49/km^{2} (211.1/sq mi)

Households (2015 census)
  - Total: 3,741
- Time zone: UTC+09:00 (TLT)

Maubara, officially Maubara Administrative Post (Portuguese: Posto Administrativo de Maubara, Tetum: Postu administrativu Maubara), is an administrative post (and was formerly a subdistrict) in Liquiçá municipality, Timor-Leste, just west of the city of Liquiçá. Its seat or administrative centre is Vaviquinia.
