= Tokodede language =

Austronesian language spoken in Timor-Leste

Tokodede
- Region: Timor-Leste
- Native speakers: 40,000 (2010 census)
- Language family: Austronesian: Malayo-Polynesian; Central Timor; Nuclear Central Timor; Tokodede
- Dialects: Keha (Keia)

Official status
- Recognised minority language in: ETimor-Leste

Language codes
- ISO 639-3: tkd
- Glottolog: tuku1254
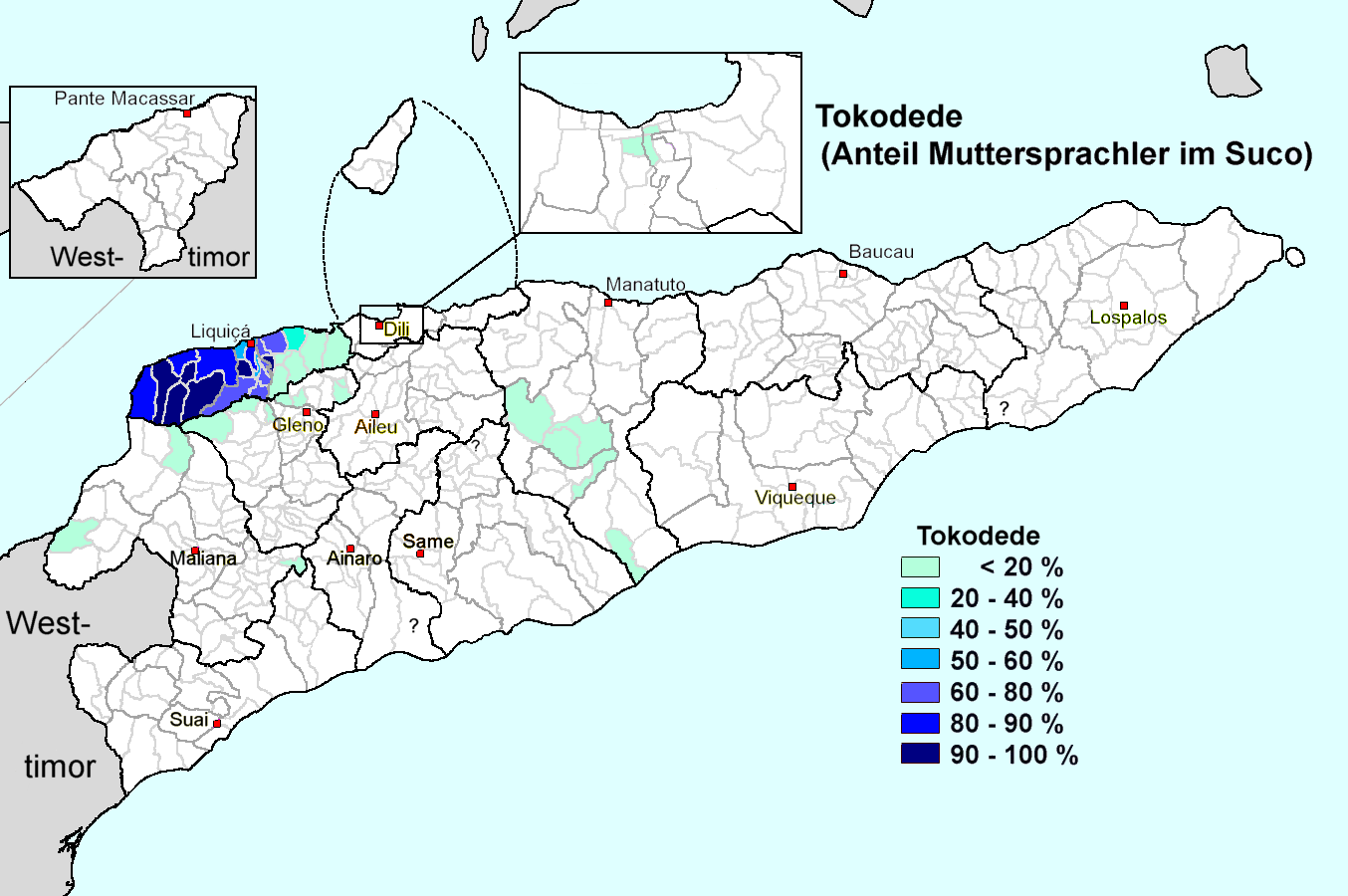
- Distribution of Tokodede mother-tongue speakers in Timor-Leste

Tokodede (also known as Tukude, Tocodede, Tokodé, and Tocod) is one of the languages of Timor-Leste, spoken by about 39,000 Tokodede people in the municipality of Liquiçá, especially the administrative posts of Maubara and Liquiçá along the northern reaches of the Loes River system. The number of speakers has declined in recent years. It is a Malayo-Polynesian language in the Timor group.

The first significant text published in Tokodede was Peneer meselo laa Literatura kidia-laa Timór, translated by João Paulo T. Esperança, Fernanda Correia, and Cesaltina Campos from an article by João Paulo T. Esperança entitled "A Brief Look at the Literature of Timor". The Tokodede version was published in the literary supplement Várzea de Letras, published by the Department of Portuguese Language of the National University of Timor-Leste, in Dili, in December 2005.
