= Special Panels for Serious Crimes =

The Special Panels for Serious Crimes (also called the East Timor Tribunal) was the hybrid international–East Timorese tribunal that was created in 2000 by the United Nations Transitional Administration in East Timor (UNTAET) to try cases of "serious criminal offences" which took place in East Timor in 1999. The Special Panels sat from 2000 to 2006.

== Mandate ==
The Special Courts were mandated by the Special Representative of the UN Secretary General to try the following categories of crimes:

- Genocide
- War crimes
- Crimes against humanity
- Murder
- Sexual offences
- Torture

To be eligible for investigation in front of the Special Panels the alleged crimes had to be committed in Timor-Leste or by/against a citizen of Timor Leste.

== Structure ==
Until 2003, there was generally only one panel of the court. In 2003, a second and a third panel were organised. Each of the panels was composed of two international judges and one East Timorese judge. International judges came from Brazil, Burundi, Cape Verde, Germany, Italy, Portugal, Uganda, and the United States.

== Trials ==
Shortly after the Special Panels was formed, the Serious Crimes Unit was also created by UNTAET to investigate and prosecute the crimes in question. The Special Panels issued indictments for almost 400 people. A major hurdle in trying some of the accused was that they were Indonesian nationals and the government of Indonesia refused to turn them over to East Timor or the United Nations forces.

Special Panels held 55 trials involving 88 accused persons. Four persons were acquitted and 84 were convicted, with 24 of the 84 pleading guilty.

When the United Nations ceased funding the Special Panels and the Serious Crimes Unit, there were 514 outstanding cases for which investigations had been conducted but no indictments issued and 50 cases for which no investigations had yet been conducted. These cases which were not tried include 828 cases of alleged murder, 60 alleged cases of rape, and over 100 cases of alleged torture or other serious violence.

=== Liquiçá Church Massacre ===
The second Special Panel heard testimony on the Liquiçá Church Massacre. The panel was made up of Judge Benfeito Mosso Ramos (Cape Verde) presiding, Judge Antero Luis (Portugal), and Judge Antonio Helder (East Timor).

== Court problems ==
The Special Panels were criticised for the lack of ownership by East Timor. They suffered from a crisis in funding and a lack of support for the trials. Indonesia did not cooperate with the court and as most of the alleged perpetrators were from Indonesia this affected the court's ability to convict offenders. There were criticisms of the process which included suggestion the trials fell short of international standards.
