= Liquiçá Church massacre =

1999 mass killing in East Timor

- Part of the East Timor genocide
- Location: 8.5875°S 125.342°E; Liquiçá, East Timor
- Date: April 1999 (UTC+9)
- Target: East Timorese Catholics
- Attack type: Massacre
- Deaths: 30 – 100 (official source); 200 (other source)
- Perpetrators: Pro-Indonesia militias (mainly Besi Merah Putih)
- Motive: Anti-Christian sentiment

The Liquiçá Church massacre was a mass-killing that occurred in April 1999, during East Timor's bid for independence. It was the first case to be heard by the Second Special Panel.

== Events and aftermath ==
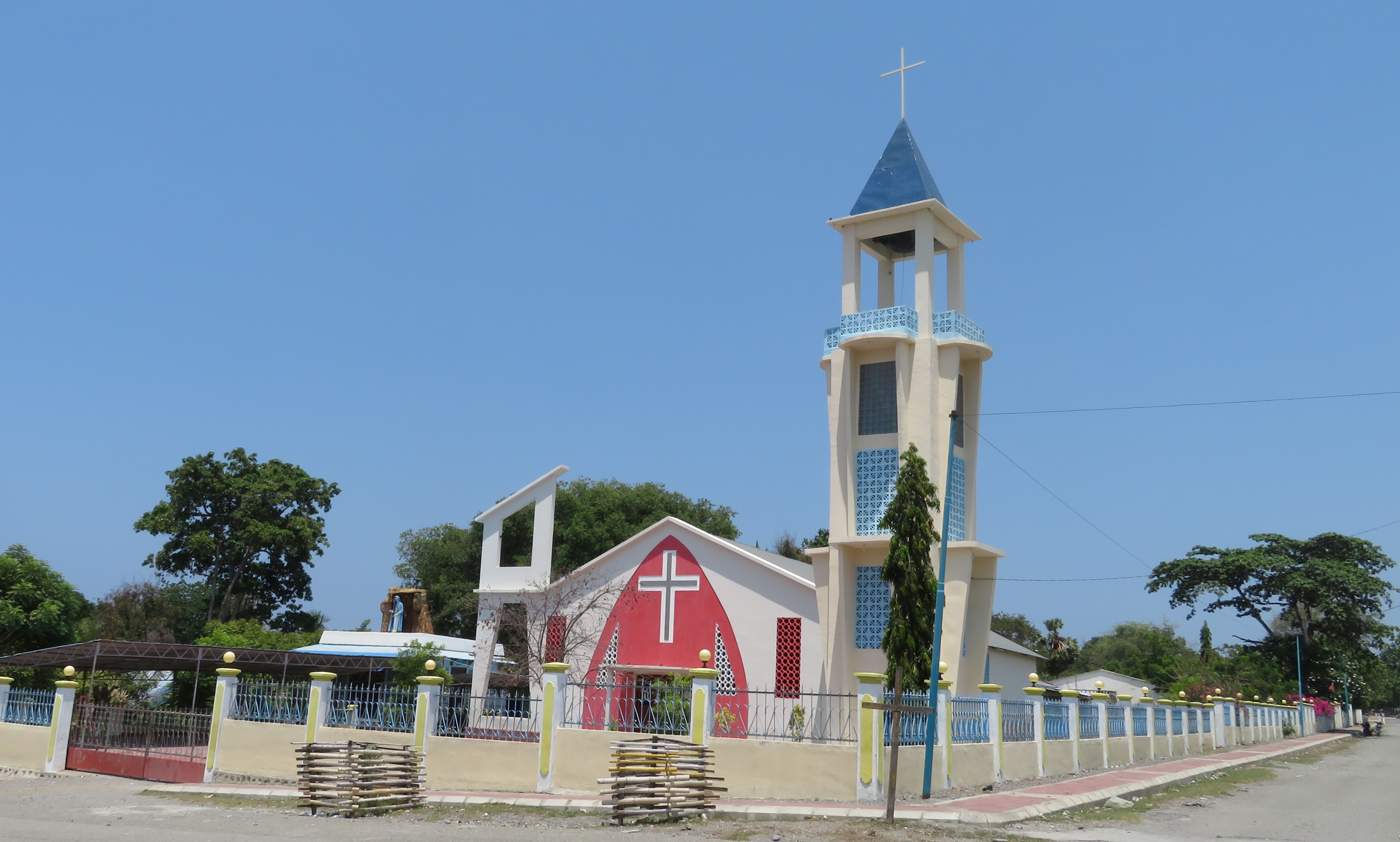
Church São João de Brito 2016

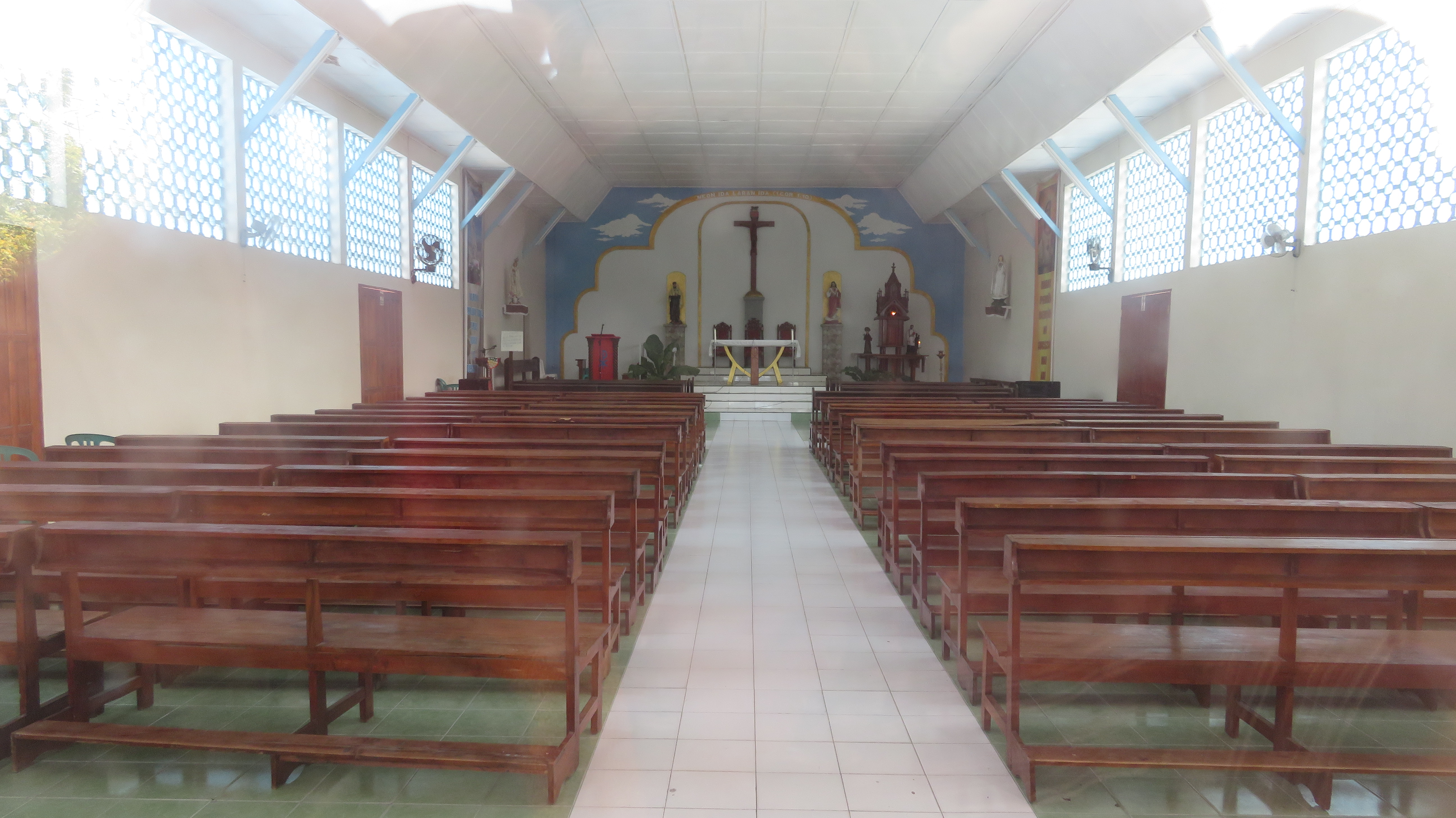
Church São João de Brito 2016

During the event, up to some 100 East Timorese people were murdered at the Liquica priest's house next to the local Catholic church. The event left many witnesses, including the local Catholic Priest, Raphael dos Santos. The total number of victims at the hands of pro-Indonesia militias (primarily the Besi Merah Putih) and Indonesian soldiers and police in Liquica has never been fully determined, ranging from a low of five claimed by Indonesia, to more than 100 by local sources.

The crime was first investigated by Australian diplomats at the invitation of the Indonesian Government, but the report wasn't released until 2001. Later it was investigated by a team of International Police which became known as the UNTAET Crime Scene Detachment, serving under the United Nations and representing the countries of the United States, Great Britain, and the Philippines, as well as Australian and New Zealand Military Police Crime Scene Specialists. The unit was initially commanded by police officer Steve Minhinett, of Great Britain. It was later commanded by American police officer Karl Clark, and relied heavily on American intelligence officer Allen Williams. This investigation led to a large number of exhumations of the dead, witness statements taken, and ultimately charges of assassination, torture, forced deportation and murder being filed against 21 Indonesian Officers, and pro-Indonesian East Timorese Militia.

The Liquiçá Church massacre and the attack at Manuel Carrascalão's house were two of the ten priority investigations of the Serious Crimes Unit. This case was the first of several indictments arising from these investigations to reach trial. The very first trial was to be heard by the Second Special Panel, consisting of Judge Benfeito Mosso Ramos (Cape Verde) presiding, Judge Antero Luís (Portugal) and Judge António Helder (East Timor). The hearing was conducted in five languages: Portuguese, English, Indonesian, Tetum and Tokodede, the local language of the Liquiçá area. The court heard detailed testimony about involvement of the Besi Merah Putih militia in the attack, including a militia ceremony in which they were allegedly forced to drink a cocktail of alcohol, animal blood and drugs in preparation for the killings at the Liquiçá Church. Testimony implicated the direct participation in the attacks by Indonesian soldiers, who were allegedly dressed in civilian clothes to look like militia members. Leoneto Martins, Tomé Diogo, Eurico Guterres and João da Silva Tavares were the primary suspects and leading figures during the massacre, all were East Timorese.

== See also ==
- List of massacres in Timor-Leste
