= Liquiçá =

Liquiçá Likisá
- City
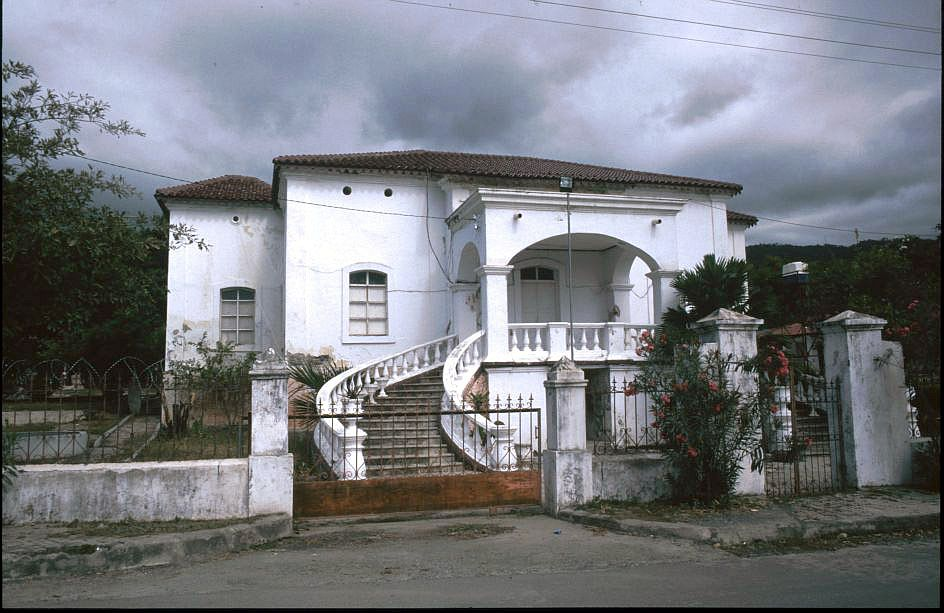

- Location in Timor-Leste
- Coordinates: 8°35′S 125°21′E
- Country: Timor-Leste
- Municipality: Liquiçá District

Area
  - Total: 355.28 km^{2} (137.17 sq mi)
- Elevation: 87 m (285 ft)

Population (2015 census)
  - Total: 5,005
  - Density: 14.09/km^{2} (36.49/sq mi)
- Time zone: UTC+09:00 (TLT)
- Climate: Aw

Liquiçá (Tetun: Likisá) is a coastal city in Timor-Leste, 32 km to the west of Dili, the national capital. Liquiçá is the capital of Liquiçá District. The city has a population of 5,005 inhabitants.

== History ==
A part of the colonial administration of East Timor was arrested in Maubara and Liquiçá during the Japanese occupation of East Timor from 1942 - 1945. As a consequence the two towns where spared from the air raids which devastated the rest of the island. On 6 April 1999, in the campaign of intimidation and violence that preceded the referendum for East Timorese independence, about 200 persons were killed in the Liquiçá Church Massacre, when members of the Besi Merah Putih militia, supported by Indonesian soldiers and police, attacked the parish church Igreja de São João de Brito. (The number of casualties is disputed by Indonesia).

During the leadup to the referendum on independence, most of the buildings in the city were destroyed. Only a few buildings from the Portuguese and Indonesian times remain. Starting in 1999, it became the district headquarters for the International Police, assigned there by UNTAET, under the United Nations. It also was the home base of operations for the UNTAET Crime Scene Detachment.

== Languages ==
Most of the inhabitants speak Tocodede.

== Sights and architecture ==
The former Headquarters of the Administrator de Liquiçá, built in 1938 in a neoclassical style with a large porch with ten columns measuring 5 metres in height each, are one of the most impressive buildings in town. Nowadays, the building is used as an administration building of the municipality. The Primary School opposite the headquarters was built in the 1940s with four classrooms and one administration building.

The former Residence of the Administrator of Liquiçá was probably built before 1910 in a neoclassical style with an impressive staircase in front and a large garden with a pool behind. During the Indonesian occupation, it served as a residence of the Indonesian administrator. Opposite the building a small park was laid out with several pavilions.

The Office of the Deputy Secretary of the Administrator was built in a colonial style in carved stone in 1936. The building was renovated in 2016. It is currently used by the Ministry of Public Works. The former Municipal Market which is close by was built in the 1930s featuring a square plan. It had a corridor surrounded by small distribution outlets.

The former Municipal School, built before 1910 with stone masonry walls featuring two volumes, was the first school to be built in the district. It served as a military pharmacy during the Indonesian occupation.

Hotel Tokodede was probably built between 1930 and 1950 in a privileged area of the town where colonial officers overnighted. Its terrace still offers a beautiful view of the coconut tree-lined sandy beach of Liquiçá. The building is still used for social events.

The Parish Church of Liquiçá Igreja de São João de Brito which became famous because of the Liquiçá Church Massacre was built in 1946. The clock tower was added when the church was renovated in 2016.

The Customs House is a rectangular building of Portuguese origin whose exact date of construction remains unknown. It might have been built around the middle of the 20th century. The building consisting of two halls which is close to the beach was destroyed in 1999.

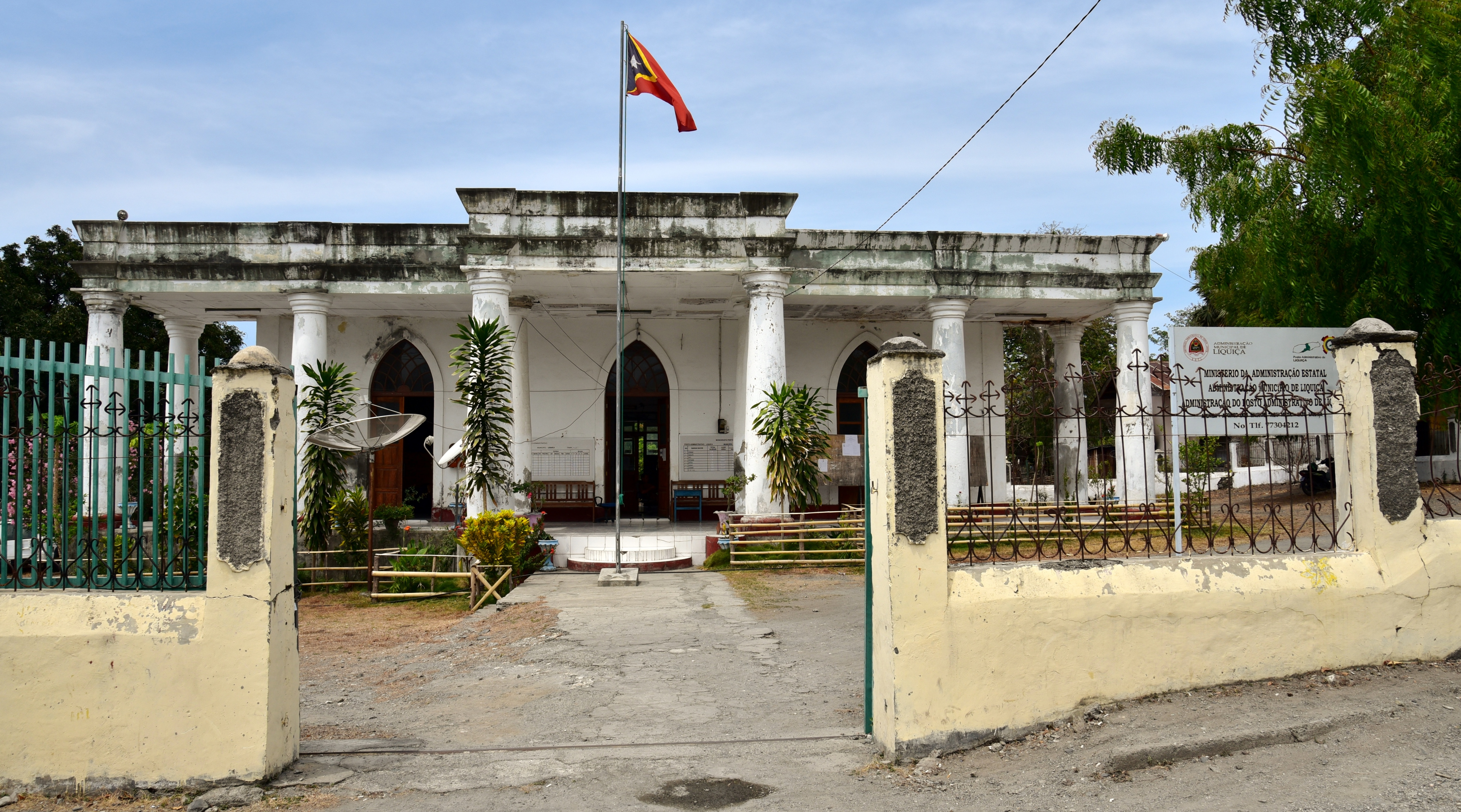
Former Headquarters of the Administrator de Liquiçá

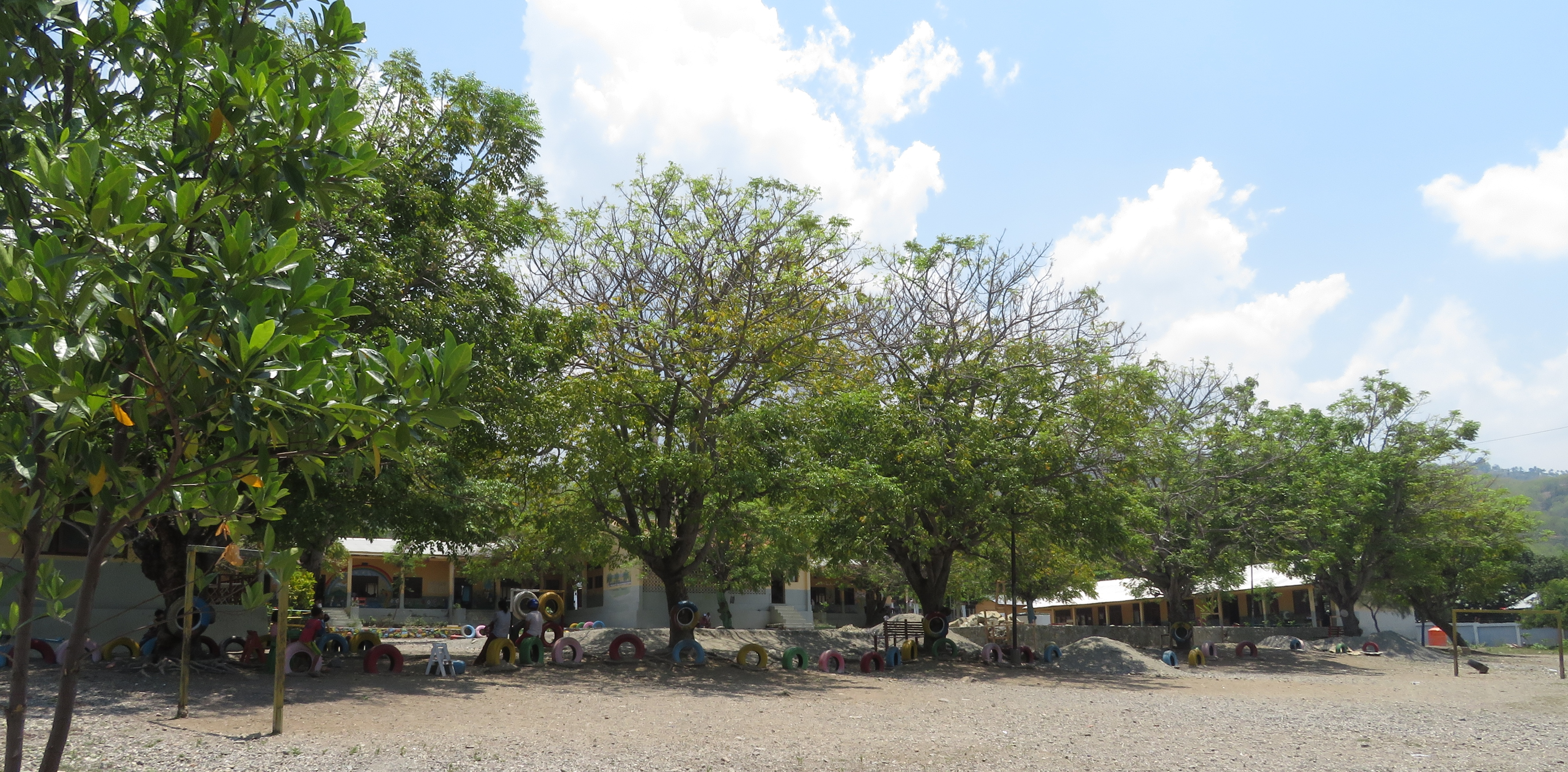
Primary School

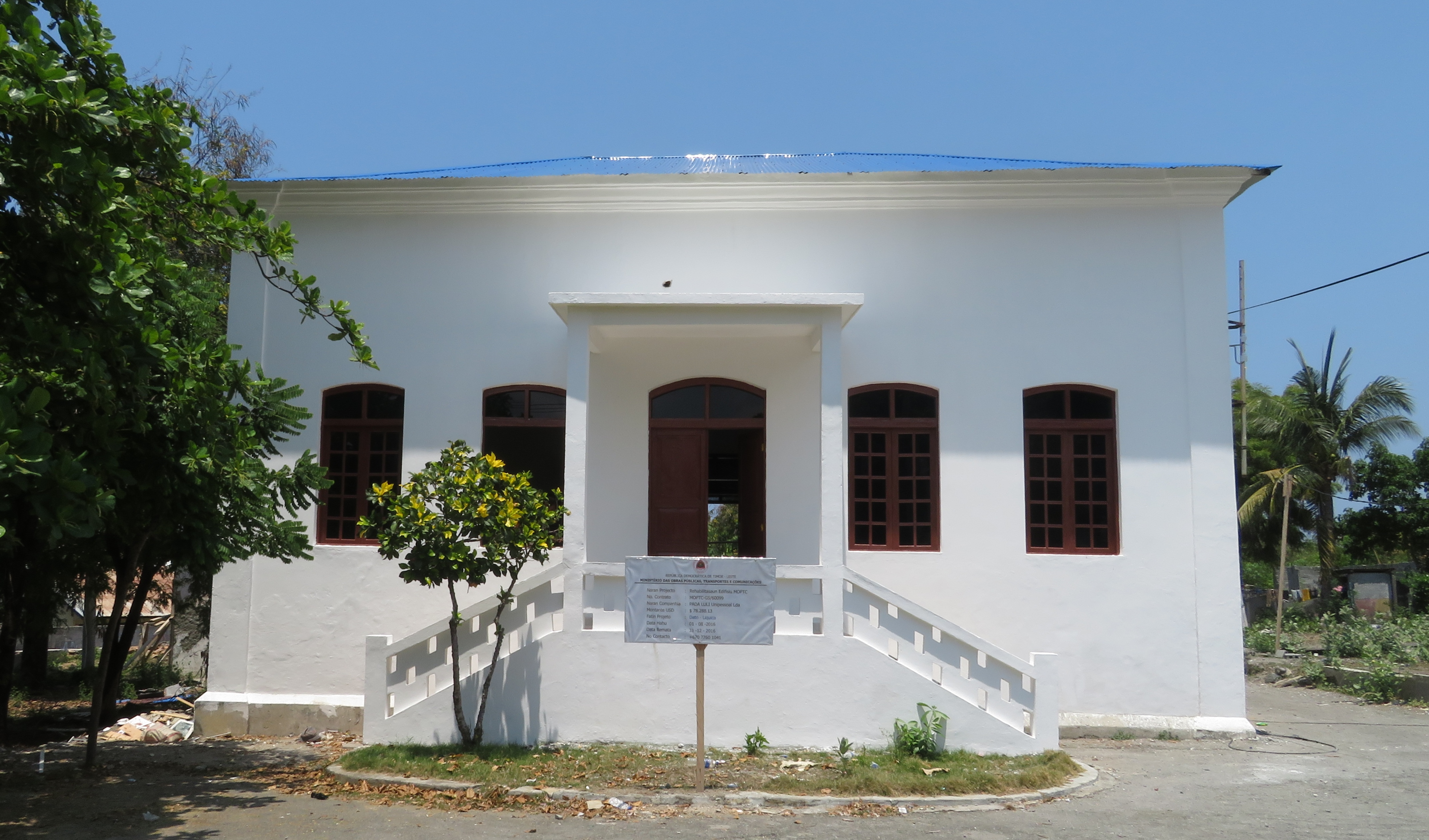
Office of the Deputy Secretary of the Administrator

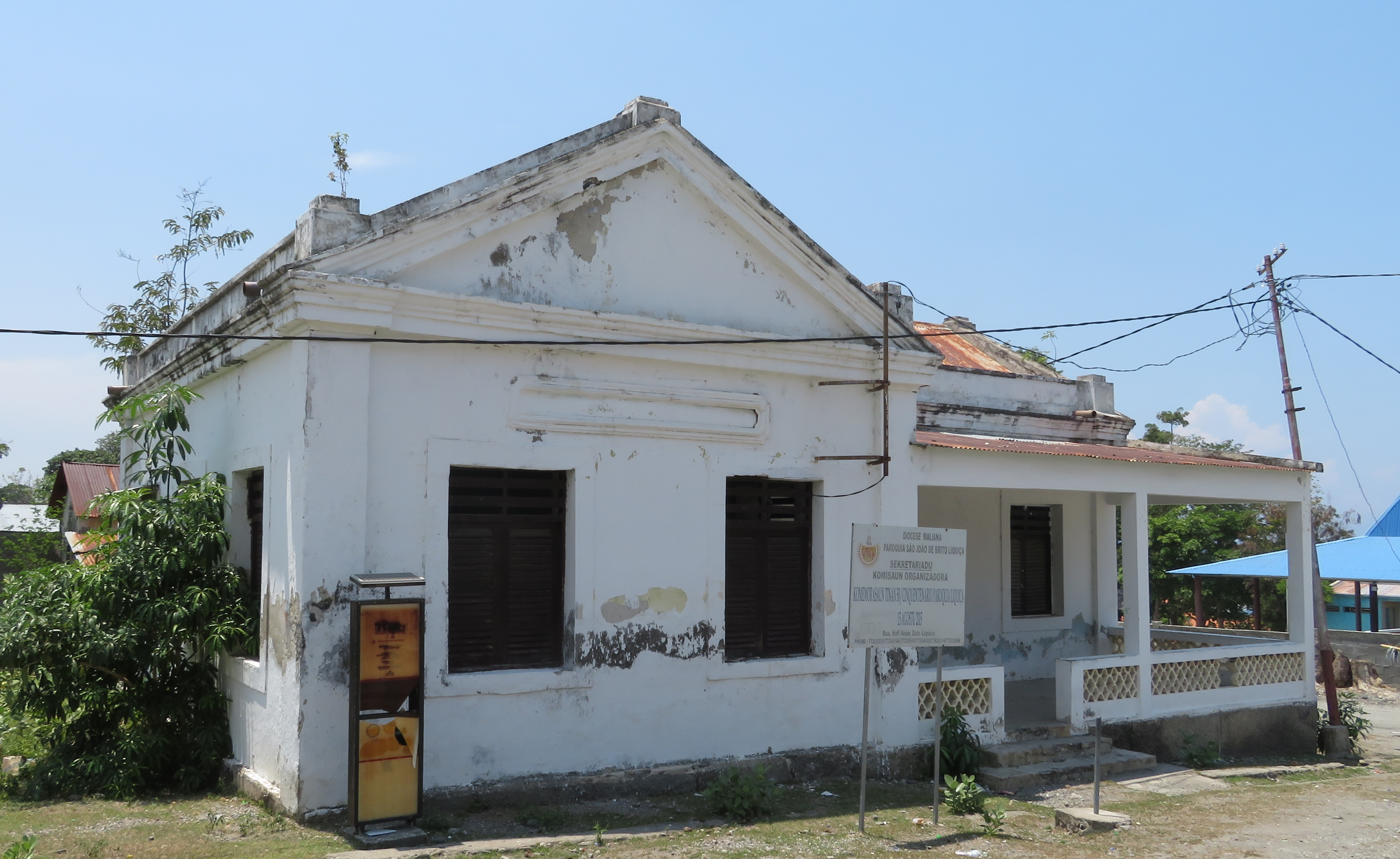
Former Municipal School

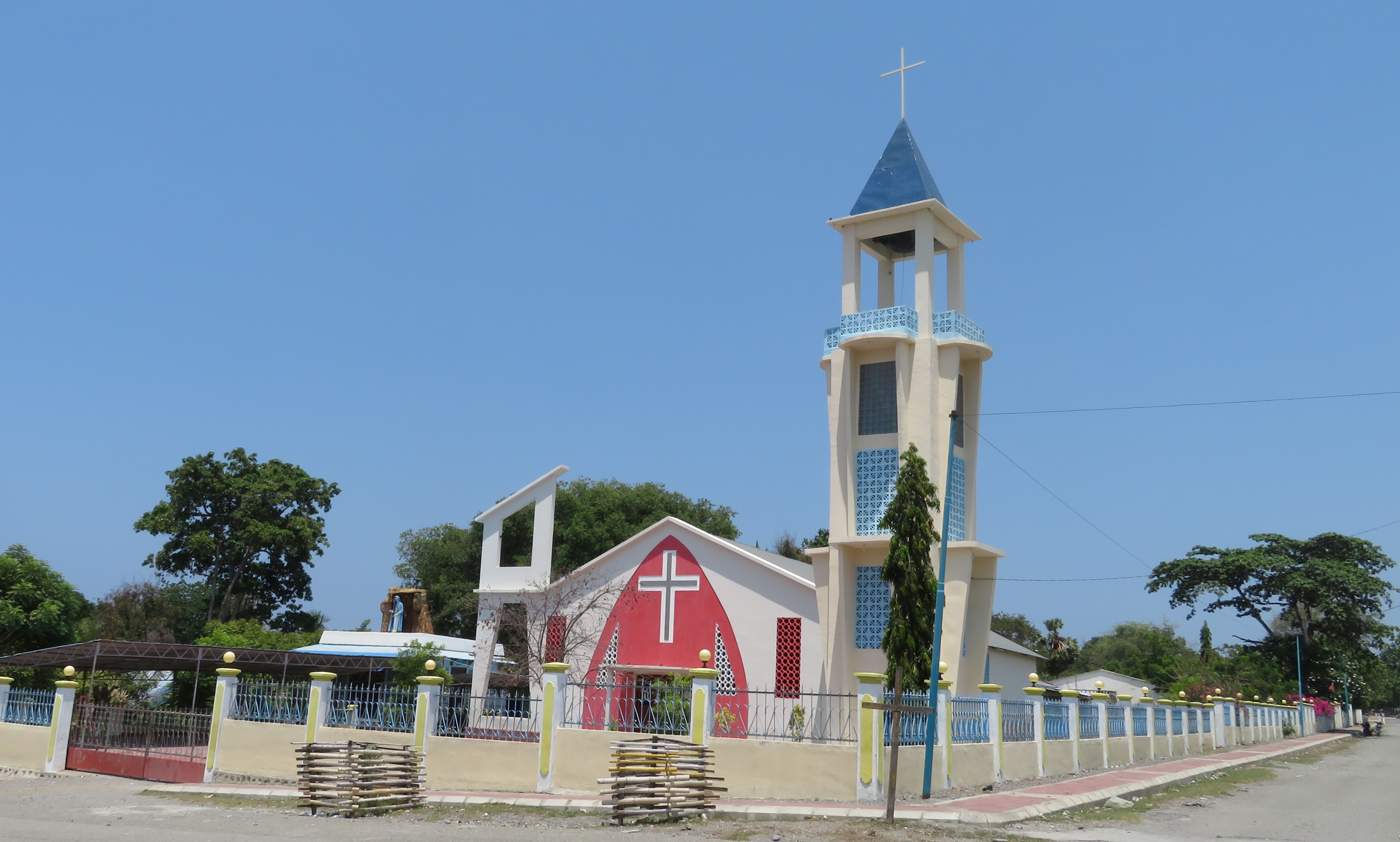
Parish church Igreja de São João de Brito

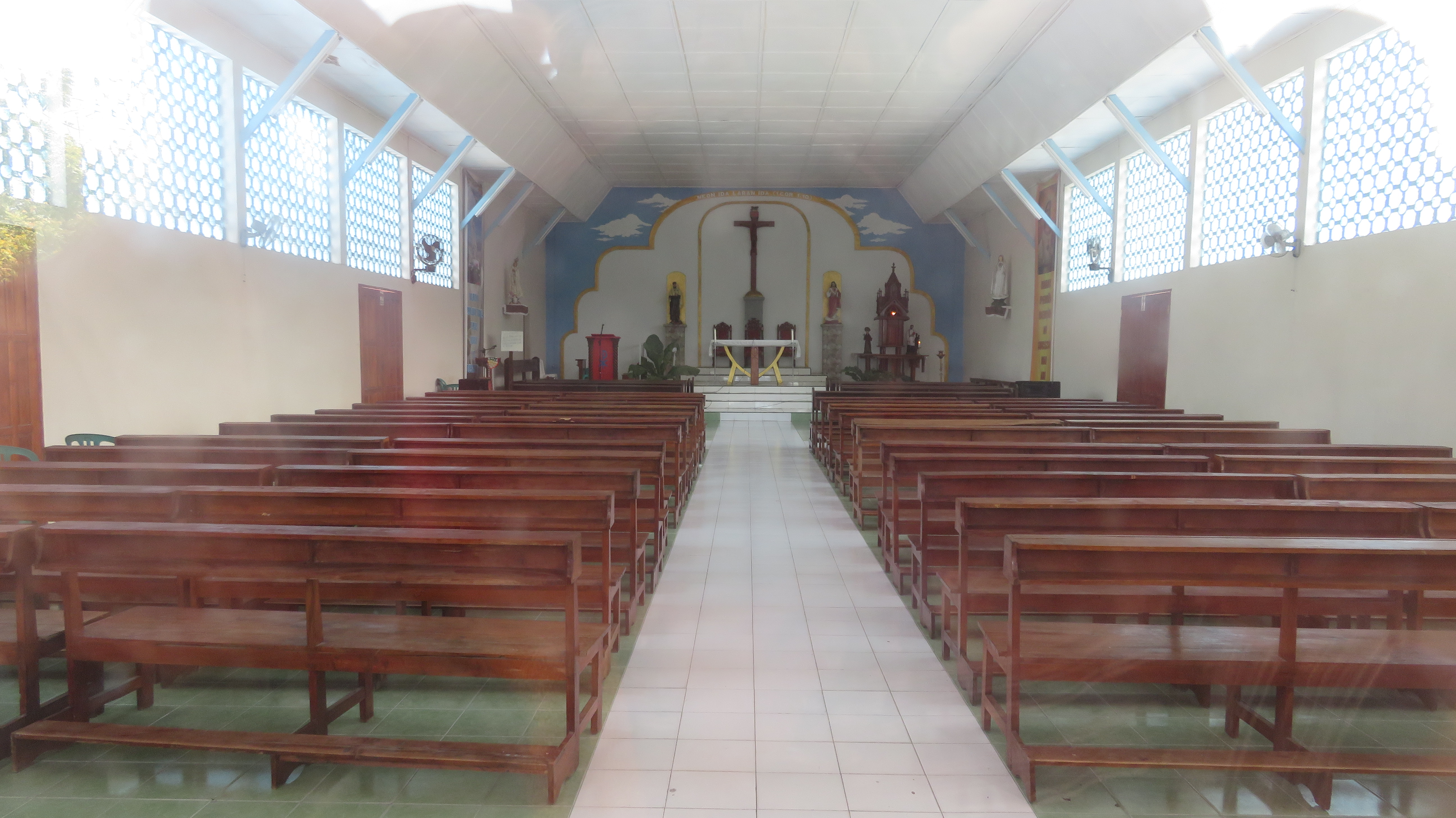
Parish church Igreja de São João de Brito

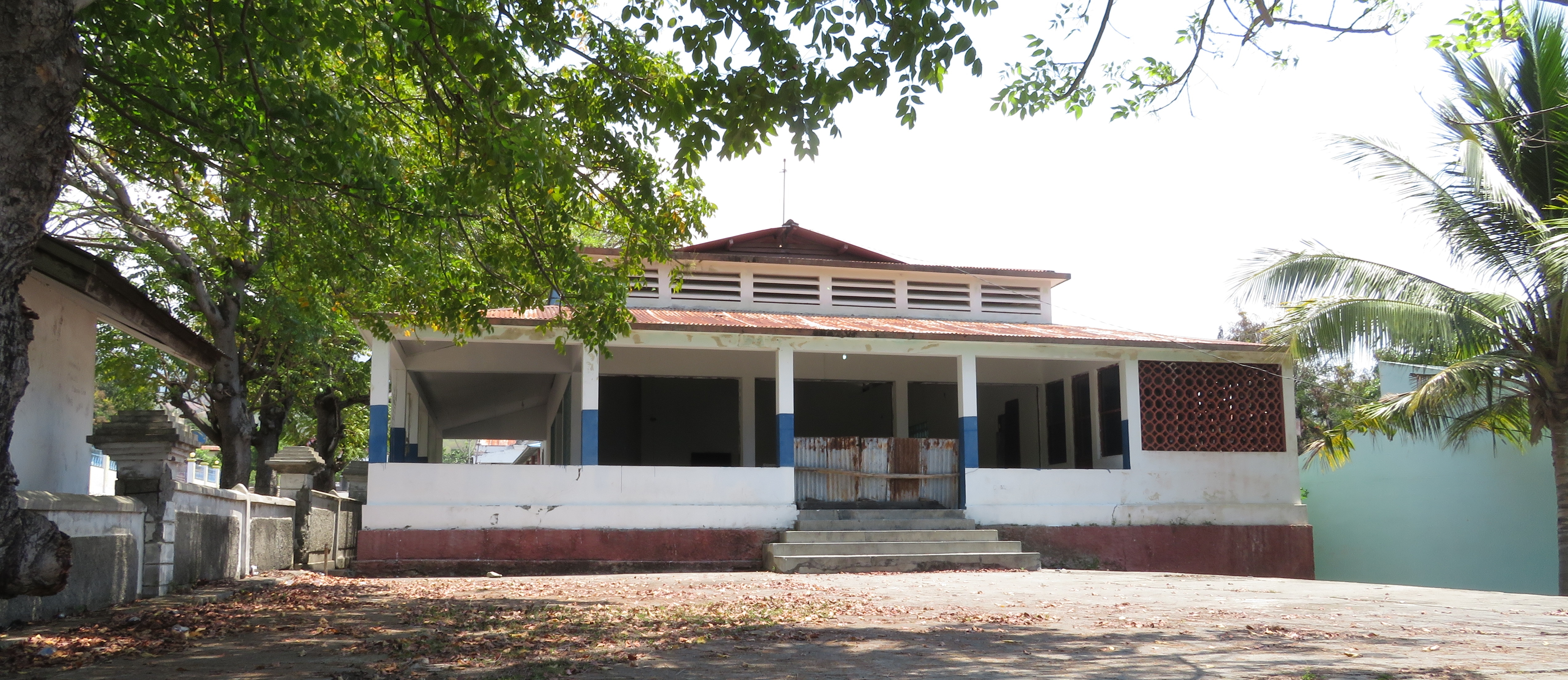
Former Hotel Tokodede

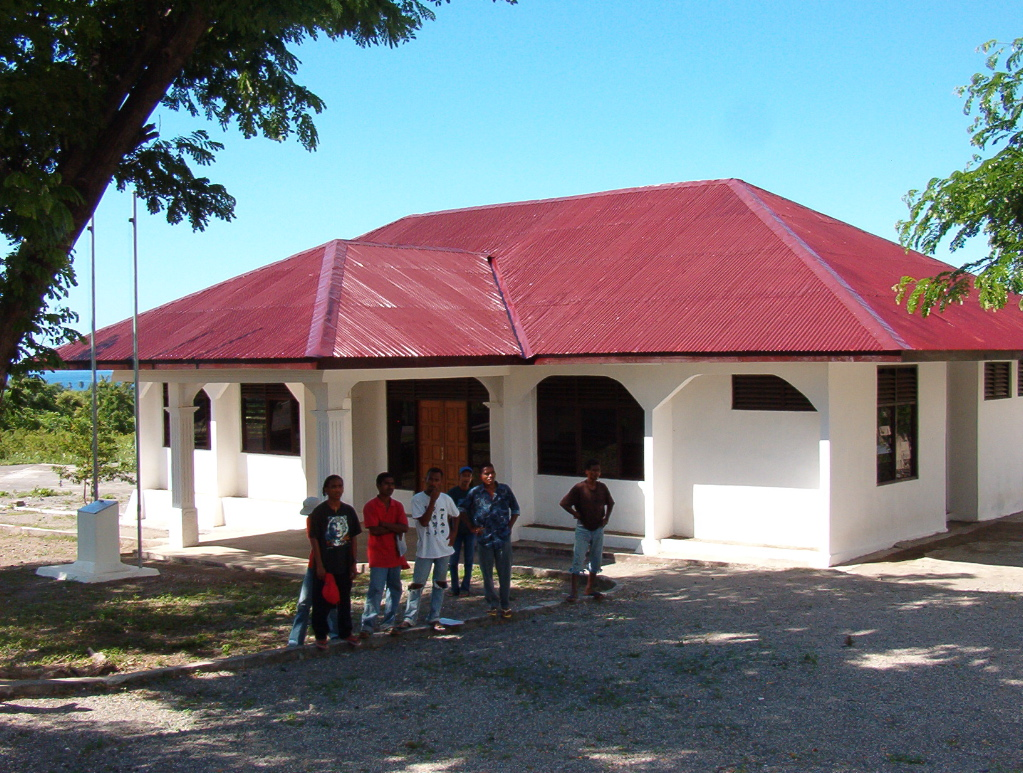
Women and children's community centre in Liquiçá
