= Serious Crimes Unit =

The Serious Crimes Unit was the official title given to an elite unit of International Police investigators during the United Nations 1999 to 2004 mission in East Timor.

The unit ultimately took over the investigation of Human Rights violations alleged to have been committed in East Timor by Indonesian and pro-Indonesian military forces during 1999, from the UN Mandate that began in February, 1999. The unit's cases were tried before the Special Panels of the Dili District Court.

Many of the cases that were eventually handled by this unit included cases previously overseen by the UNTAET Crime Scene Detachment. One member of that squad of investigators, Karl Clark, played an intricate part in the Serious Crimes Unit investigations, and its eventual prosecution of war crimes suspects.

From 20 May 2002 it was part of the United Nations Mission of Support to East Timor and was scheduled to complete its investigations by the end of the year, after which it would continue to provide assistance to prosecutors. At the end of the UNMISET mandate the Serious Crimes Unit was to preserve a complete copy of its records.

For part of its time the office was under-staffed, and in 2006 there was a wave of looting which destroyed some of the evidence against high Indonesian officials and scattered forensic evidence (human body parts) over the ground.
