= Liquiçá Administrative Post =

Administrative post in Liquiçá Municipality, Timor-Leste

Liquiçá
- Administrative Post
- Posto Administrativo de Liquiçá (Portuguese); Postu administrativu Likisá (Tetum)
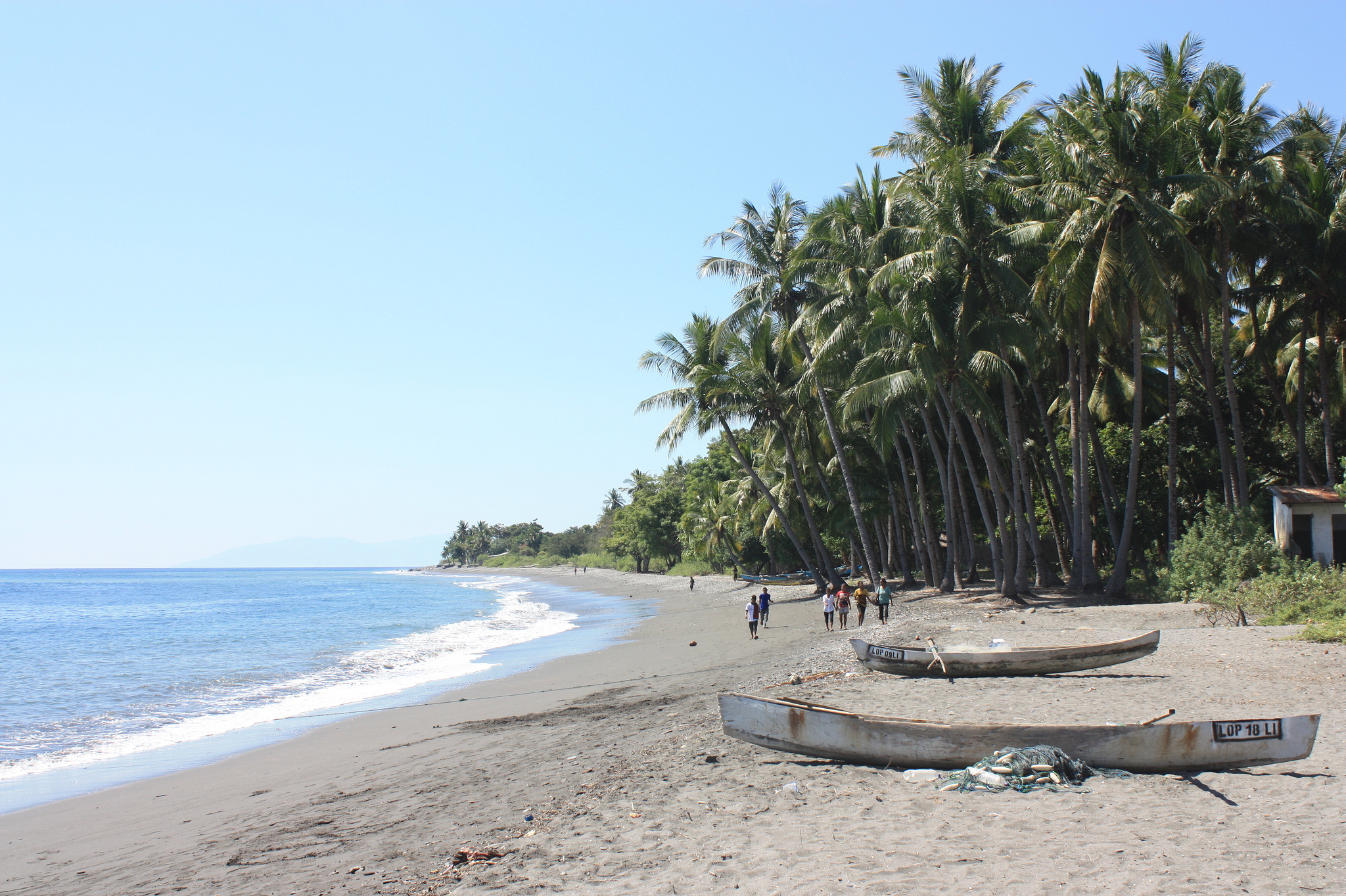
- Suco Dato, Liquiçá

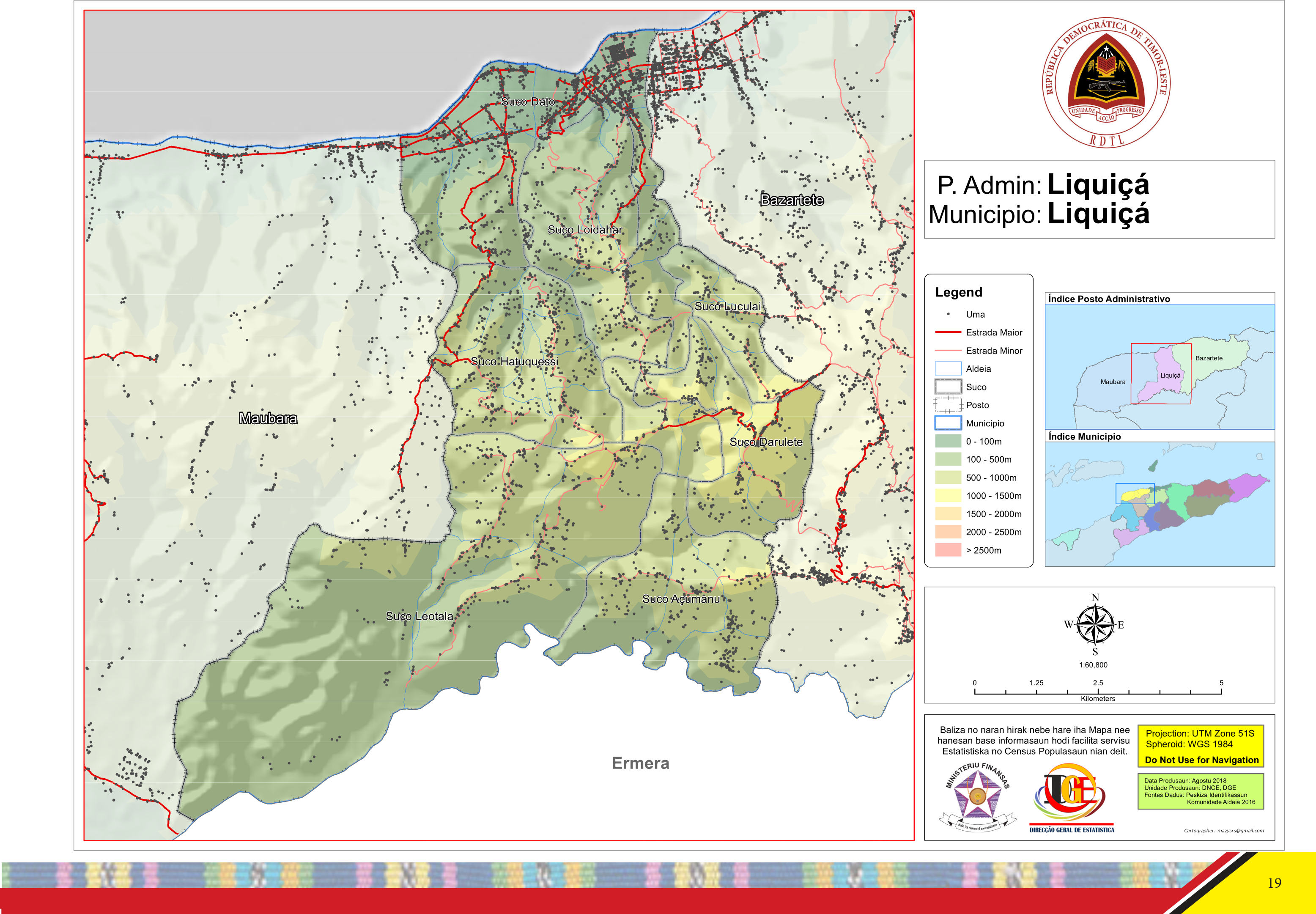
- Official map

- Location within East Timor
- Coordinates: 8°36′S 125°20′E
- Country: Timor-Leste
- Municipality: Liquiçá
- Seat: Dato
- Sucos: Açumanu; Darulete; Dato; Hatuquessi; Leotala; Loidahar; Luculai

Area
  - Total: 93.9 km^{2} (36.3 sq mi)

Population (2015 census)
  - Total: 22,128
  - Density: 236/km^{2} (610/sq mi)

Households (2015 census)
  - Total: 3,559
- Time zone: UTC+09:00 (TLT)

Liquiçá, officially Liquiçá Administrative Post (Portuguese: Posto Administrativo de Liquiçá, Tetum: Postu administrativu Likisá), is an administrative post (and was formerly a subdistrict) in Liquiçá municipality, Timor-Leste. Its seat or administrative centre is Dato.
