= Timorese Democratic Union =

Conservative political party in Timor-Leste

Timorese Democratic Union União Democrática Timorense
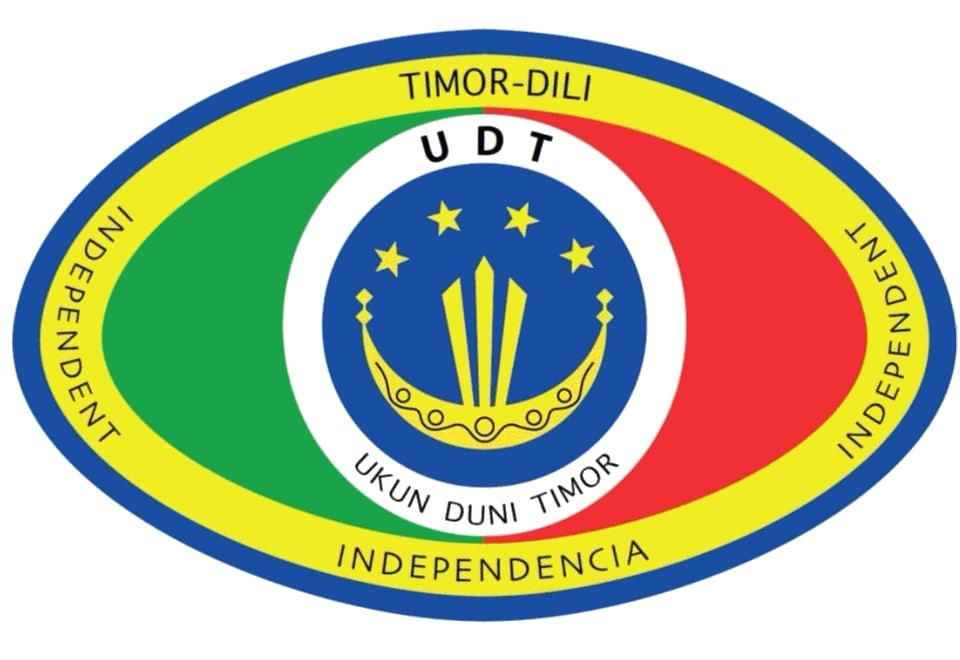
- Leader: Gilman Santos
- Founded: 11 May 1974
- Headquarters: Dili
- Ideology: Conservatism; Nationalism; Factions: Regionalism (until 1975); Lusotropicalism (until 1975); Formerly: Indonesian integration
- Political position: Right-wing
- Colours: White, Green, Red, Yellow, Blue, Gold
- Slogan: Mate Bandeira Hun
- National Parliament: 0 / 65

Party flag

Website
- udtimor.blogspot.com.es

The Timorese Democratic Union (Portuguese: União Democrática Timorense, UDT) is a conservative political party in Timor-Leste. It was the first party to be established in the country on 11 May 1974, following the Carnation Revolution in Portugal.

== History ==
=== Early history (1974–1975) ===
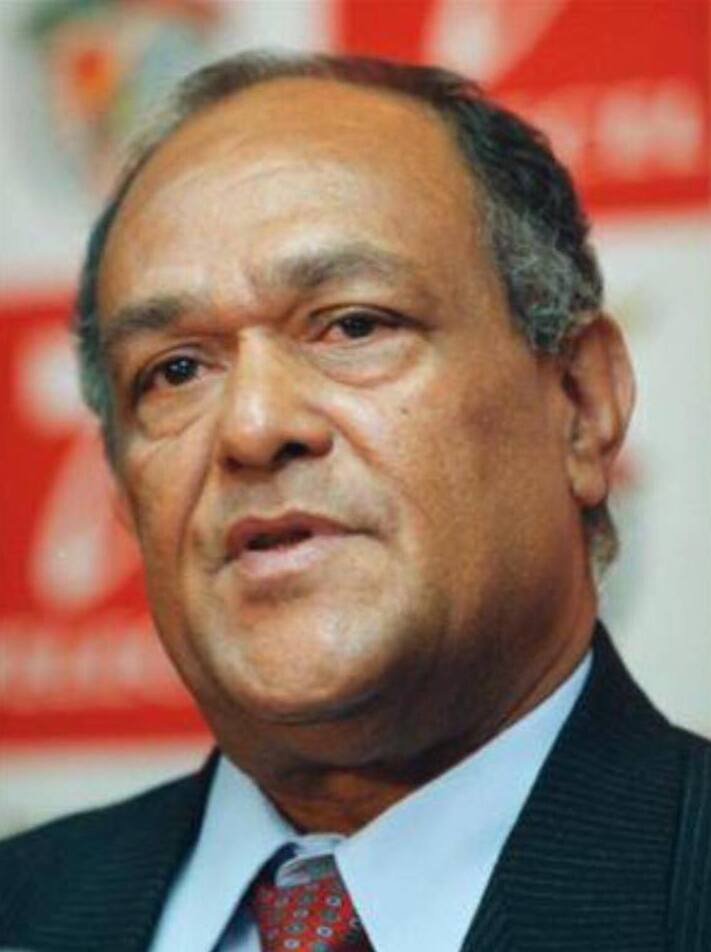
João Viegas Carrascalao

The UDT originally advocated continued links with Portugal instead of complete independence, using the Tetum slogan Mate Bandeira Hun, meaning 'Death in the shadow of the flag', but later formed an alliance with the more left-wing Frente Revolucionaria de Timor-Leste Independente (Fretilin) to work towards gradual independence in January 1975. Initially, the party's programme consisted of democracy, human rights, self-determination and income redistribution. The founders of the party included the brothers Mário, Manuel and João Carrascalão, Domingos de Oliveira (the first General Secretary), Francisco Xavier Lopes da Cruz and César Augusto Mousinho (then Mayor of Dili and Vice President of the UDT). Mário Carrascalão was the founding president, but had to relinquish his office to the former customs officer Lopes da Cruz under pressure from Portuguese officers, as Carrascalão was said to have too close ties to the old dictatorship. Moisés da Costa Amaral was president of the political commission from 1975 to 1989. César Augusto Mouzinho, the mayor of Dili, became deputy chairman of the UDT.

This alliance lasted for only five months and broke up among accusations that Fretilin was not exercising control over its more extreme members, specifically those of Communist leanings. Although by this time UDT leaders like Francisco Lopes da Cruz had held meetings with BAKIN, the then Indonesian military intelligence, which had signalled Jakarta's misgivings about an independent state under Fretilin control.

On August 11 of that year, after a majority in favour of Fretilin threatened to emerge, the UDT staged a coup against the Portuguese administration, and a three-month civil war erupted. This coup was partly done in order to deprive Indonesia of a pretext for intervention. The neighbouring country threatened to invade in order to prevent Fretilin from coming to power. UDT President Lopes da Cruz was arrested by UDT leaders João Viegas Carrascalão and Domingos de Oliveira, as he was suspected of collaborating with Indonesia. The suspicion was later confirmed. However, the UDT was defeated by Fretilin in the ensuing civil war. Around 2,000 people died, including UDT supporters who had already been captured by Fretilin. As many as 3.000 UDT politicians and supporters fled across the border to West Timor, where they were required and pressured to sign a petition calling for East Timor's incorporation into Indonesia, with most of the UDT loyalists declining the offer, as it would be considered a betrayal to its own ideology and trust for the country. After the signing, the UDT split into two factions, with only a small percentage of UDT giving up on hope and decided to side with Timorese Popular Democratic Association (APODETI) to call for Indonesian annexation, while the rest of the UDT decided to take a fight with the Indonesian invading forces or decided to leave Timor to seek help and make a congress with Fretilin in Australia and Portugal to work towards independence.

=== While Timor Leste was part of Indonesia (1975–1999) ===
One of the UDT's most senior leaders, Mário Viegas Carrascalão, sided with the Indonesian regime and served as the governor of Indonesia's 'Timor Timur province' between 1987 and 1992. His brother, João, however, led the UDT in exile in Portugal and Australia, later joining with Fretilin in a national unity movement called the National Council of Maubere Resistance (Portuguese: Conselho Nacional da Resistência Maubere, CNRM), later called the National Council of Timorese Resistance (Portuguese: Conselho Nacional de Resistência Timorense, CNRT), due to the disagreement between UDT and Fretilin for using the word "Maubere", as this could possibly divide the Timorese people into two.

After the occupation by Indonesia, East Timorese from Fretilin and UDT living abroad founded a national resistance council in January 1988, headed by Xanana Gusmão (under the Nacional de Resistência Maubere or CNRM and under the National Council of Maubere Resistance or CNRT from 1998). The council served as an umbrella organisation to better coordinate the fight for freedom. Manuel Carrascalão later became spokesman for the CNRT. Mário Viegas Carrascalão was governor of East Timor during the Indonesian occupation from 1983 to 1992. He uncovered human rights violations by the Indonesians in East Timor. Mário later became chairman of the East Timor Social Democratic Party.

=== Since independence (2002–present) ===
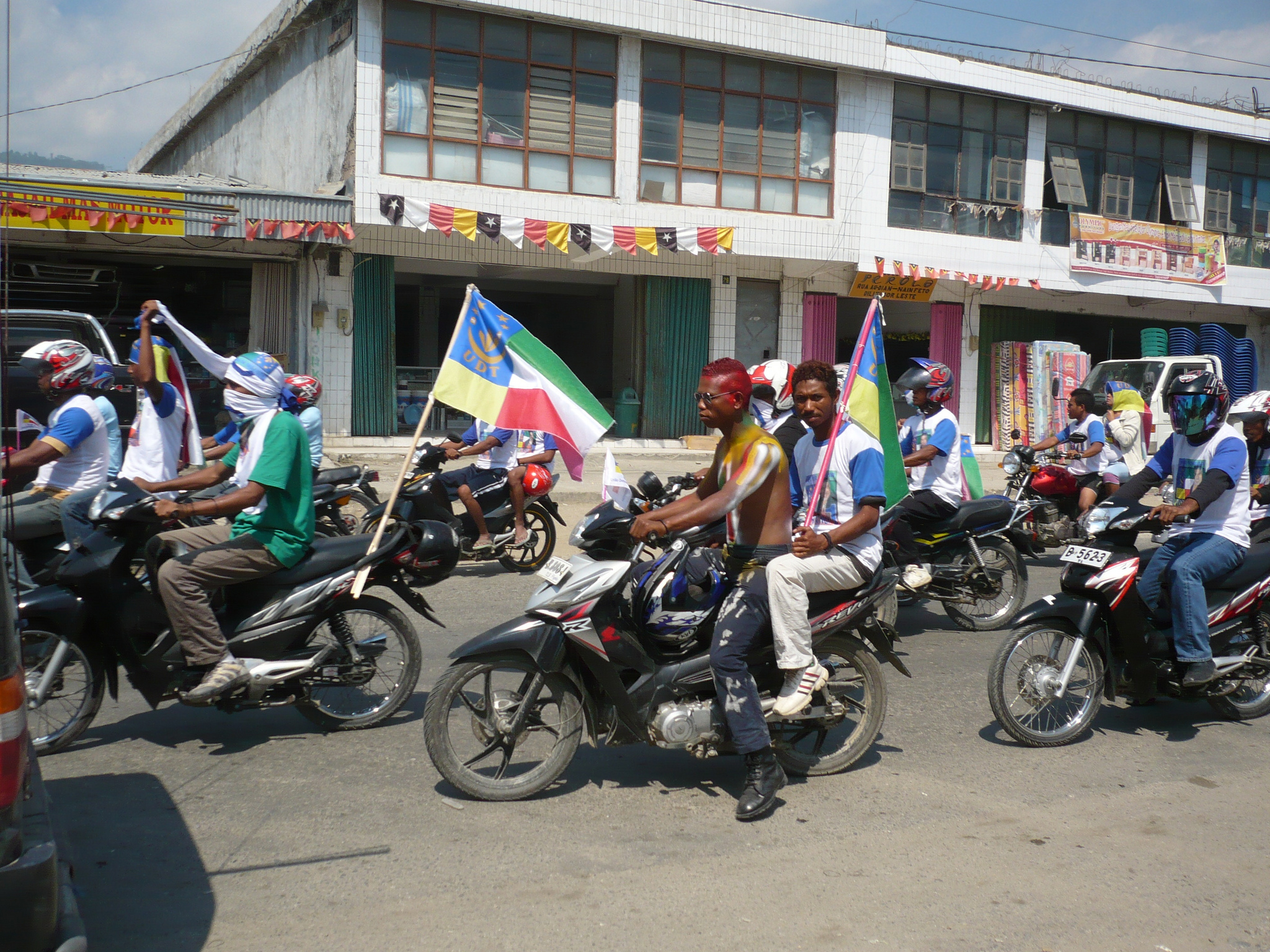
UDT campaign in Dili for the 2012 parliamentary election

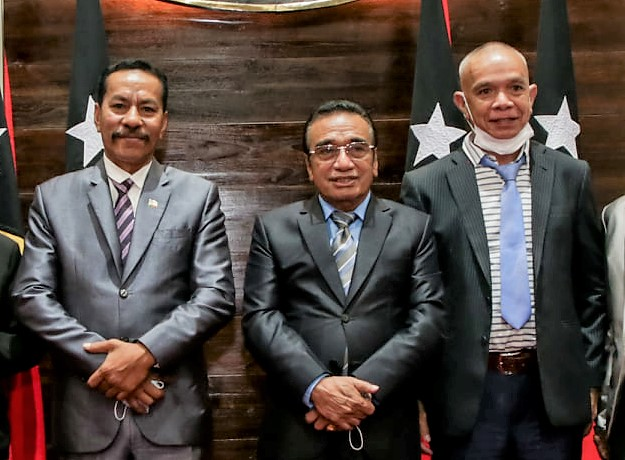
Francisco David Xavier Carlos (left) and Rodolfo Aparicio Guterres (right) with President Francisco Guterres

Following the change of government in Indonesia in 1998, and subsequently the change of policy, the UDT was able to organise in East Timor, where it supported the independence campaign. João Viegas Carrascalão led the party as chairman in independent East Timor. He died in February 2012 and Gilman Exposto dos Santos became president of the UDT in February 2010. After Domingos de Oliveira, Cipriano J. da Costa Gonsalves, and then Francisco David Xavier Carlos were Secretary General. After the end of the occupation, João Viegas Carrascalão was Minister for Infrastructure during the UN administration and coordinated the start of the reconstruction of East Timor. Manuel Carrascalão was Chairman of the National Council, a kind of transitional parliament, from April to September 2001.

In the elections to the first parliament of free Timor-Leste on 30 August 2001, the UDT received 2.36% of the vote (8,581) and two of the 88 seats. One reason for this was persistent rumours that the UDT wanted to try to seize power again. UDT deputies were Alexandre Gentil Corte-Real de Araújo and Quitéria da Costa.

In the 2007 presidential election, João Carrascalão was the last of eight candidates to be eliminated after the first round with just 1.72% of the vote. Whist In the parliamentary elections on 30 June 2007, the UDT received 0.90% (3,753) of the valid votes and thus failed to reach the three per cent threshold. It received the most support in the then district of Ermera, where it received 918 votes (2.2%).

In July 2007, the UDT merged with five other parties that had also failed to reach the three per cent threshold in the parliamentary elections to form the Liga Democrática Progressiva (LDP). The LDP is intended to serve as a political platform for the ideologically and programmatically very different parties outside of parliament. To this end, the UDT became a member of the Frenti Dezenvolvimentu Demokratiku (FDD) on 11 December 2017.

For the presidential elections in Timor-Leste in 2012, UDT President Santos declared in 2011 that he wanted to support the former military commander-in-chief Taur Matan Ruak in his candidacy, even though he emphasised his independence from all parties. In the 2012 parliamentary elections, the UDT once again failed to reach the three per cent threshold. It only received 5,332 votes (1.13%). It achieved 3.20% of the vote in Ainaro and 3.29% in Ermera.

In the 2017 parliamentary elections, the UDT received 1.98% and thus failed to reach the four per cent threshold. The UDT then joined the Fórum Demokrátiku Nasionál (FDN), but left the party alliance again at the end of 2017.

Following the political unrest between Fretilin and AMP (Aliança Maioria Parlamentar), comprised by CNRT, PLP and KHUNTO, the President of Timor-Leste decided to make another parliamentary snap election to solve the problem. UDT, not giving up on hope, decided to join forces or alliance with three political parties: PUDD (Partido Unidade Desenvolvimento Democrático), Frente-Mudança (FRETILIN's separatist party) and PDN (Partido Desenvolvimento Nacional), forming a coalition called FDD (Frente Desenvolvimento Democrático) and won 34,531 votes and won 3 seats. With the FDD, the UDT managed to enter the national parliament in the early elections in 2018 with a 5.5% share of the vote (34,301 votes). With its president Gilman Exposto dos Santos, it now had one member of parliament. However, the FDD broke up after the election of the parliamentary presidency. The UDT president now sat in parliament as a single MP until his death in 2019. UDT Secretary General Francisco David Xavier Carlos succeeded Santos in parliament. Rodolfo Aparicio Guterres became interim president until the next party congress.

On 22 February 2020, CNRT, KHUNTO, PD, UDT, FM and PUDD signed a coalition agreement to form a new government. However, President Francisco Guterres did not respond to the alliance's proposal to appoint Xanana Gusmão as Prime Minister. The alliance broke up again at the end of April when KHUNTO withdrew.

The UDT wanted to run in the 2023 parliamentary elections in Timor-Leste as part of the Frente Ampla Democrática (FAM) electoral alliance. However, on 14 March, the PDN withdrew from the alliance and submitted its own list of candidates to the Supreme Court of Timor-Leste (Tribunal de Recurso). As no congress or national conference of the party had voted on the electoral alliance, the tribunal decided not to allow the FAD to stand for election. Following the PDN's individual registration, the UDT and the other partners also submitted their own registrations for the election. However, all of these parties failed to reach the four per cent threshold. The UDT only received 0.18% (1,256 votes).

== Election results ==
=== Legislative elections ===
Election	Party leader	Votes	%	Seats	+/–	Position	Government
2001	Gilman Santos	8,581	2.36%	2 / 88	New	▲5th	Opposition
2007	Gilman Santos	3,753	0.90%	0 / 65	▼2	▼13th	Extra-parliamentary
2012	Gilman Santos	5,332	1.13%	0 / 65	0	▲11th	Extra-parliamentary
2017	Gilman Santos	11,255	1.98%	0 / 65	0	▲7th	Extra-parliamentary
2018 (Note: Run as part of the Democratic Development Forum coalition (PUDD, UDT, Frenti-Mudança and PDN).)	Gilman Santos	34,301	5.49%	1 / 65	▲1	▲4th	Opposition
2023	Gilman Santos	1,256	0.18%	0 / 65	▼1	▼14th	Extra-parliamentary
