= National Council of Timorese Resistance =

1988–2001 East Timorese anti-occupation organisation

- Portuguese: Conselho Nacional de Resistência Timorense
- Flag of the National Council of Timorese Resistance
- Formation: 1986
- Dissolved: 2002
- Purpose: Resisting the Indonesian occupation of East Timor
- Region served: East Timor
- Official language: Portuguese; Tetum
- Leader: Xanana Gusmão
- External Spokesperson: José Ramos-Horta

The National Council of Timorese Resistance (Portuguese: Conselho Nacional de Resistência Timorense, CNRT), known between 1986 and 1998 as the National Council of Maubere Resistance (Portuguese: Conselho Nacional da Resistência Maubere, CNRM), was an umbrella organisation of East Timorese individuals and organisations dedicated to resisting the Indonesian occupation of East Timor that lasted from 1975 to 1999.

== History ==
In March 1986, FRETILIN and the UDT announced the formation of a coalition. In a re-organisation of the resistance structure, resistance leader Xanana Gusmão declared the resistance force Falintil to be a non-partisan 'national' army. In 1988, he relinquished membership of FRETILIN, believing the fight for a free East Timor transcended political loyalties. He established the National Council of Maubere Resistance (CNRM) and was declared leader. José Ramos-Horta became external spokesperson.

The term Maubere was coined by Ramos-Horta in the 1970s. Initially used by the Portuguese to describe illiterate members of the Mambai, one of the largest ethnic groups of East Timor, it was reinvented as a badge of national pride by FRETILIN.

In April 1998, all Timorese political parties gathered in Peniche, Portugal, and agreed to join the CNRM under a new name. Accordingly, it was renamed the National Council of Timorese Resistance (Portuguese: Conselho Nacional de Resistência Timorense), or CNRT.

In May 1998, Indonesian president Suharto stepped down and his successor B. J. Habibie offered East Timor "special autonomy." The CNRT rejected the proposal on 11 August 1998, calling instead for a referendum on independence and the release of Xanana Gusmão from prison. The United Nations agreed to hold a referendum allowing the Timorese to choose autonomy (represented on the ballot paper by the Indonesian flag) or independence (represented on the ballot paper by the CNRT flag). A total of 78.5% opted for independence. After mass violence blamed on pro-Indonesian militias, the UN took over administration and accepted the CNRT as its Timorese counterpart organization.

In 2000, the CNRT held its first congress inside East Timor, in Dili. With independence slated for 2002, the CNRT dissolved in 2001 to allow for a multi-party democracy.

== Bibliography ==
- Dunn, James. Timor: A People Betrayed. Sydney: Australian Broadcasting Corporation, 1996. ISBN 0-7333-0537-7.
- Gusmao, Xanana To Resist is to Win: The Autobiography of Xanana Gusmao, with selected letters & speeches Edited by Sarah Niner, Melbourne:[Aurora Books], 2000. ISBN 1-86355-071-2.
- Niner, Sara (2000). "A Long Journey of Resistance: The Origins and Struggle of the CNRT". Bulletin of Concerned Asian Scholars. 32 (1 and 2): 11–18. doi:10.1080/14672715.2000.10415775. ISSN 0007-4810.
