= João Viegas Carrascalão =

East Timorese politician (1945–2012)

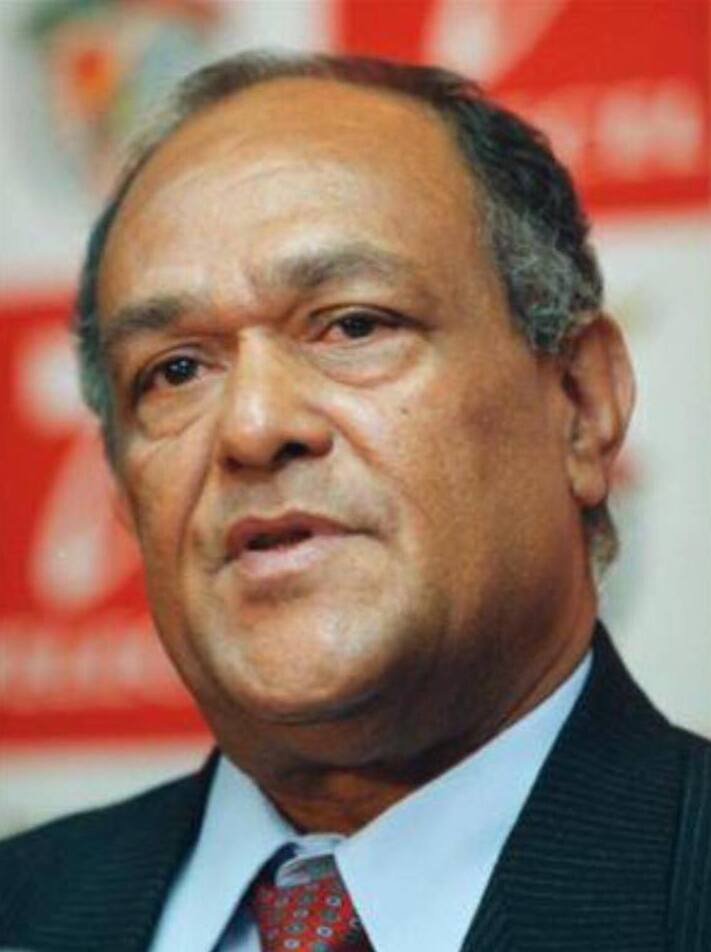
João Viegas Carrascalão

João Viegas Carrascalão (11 August 1945 – 18 February 2012; Dili, East Timor) was an East Timorese politician. He was one of the candidates in the April 2007 presidential election in East Timor.

He studied topography and surveying in Luanda and specialized in cartography in Switzerland. He was president of the Timorese Democratic Union (UDT), which he also co-founded. He supervised the August 11, 1975, coup which eventually started the civil war. The latter forced the governor, Mario Lemos Pires, to flee as well as the Portuguese contingent stationed on the nearing island of Ataúro. Consequently, Carrascalão moved to Australia and resided there throughout the Indonesian occupation. He integrated the leading agencies of the CNRT. He moved back when East Timor's independence was finally given.

In the 2007 presidential election, he took eighth and last place with 1.72% of the vote. He later served as East Timor's ambassador to South Korea from 2009 until his death in 2012.

He was the director of the Department of Geographical and Cadastral Surveys during the Portuguese administration of Timor and was the minister of infrastructure during the Transitional Government of East Timor by the UNO (UNTAET).

His daughter, Sandra Nelson, is an Australian politician.
