= Dili Polytechnic =

- Politeknik Dili
- Type: Technical college
- Active: 1990–1999
- Total staff: 160 (1999)
- Students: 450 (1999)
- Location: Hera, Dili, East Timor
- Campus: Suburban, 49 acres (20 ha)

The Dili Polytechnic (Poltek; Indonesian: Politeknik Dili) was a public technical college that existed between 1990–1999 in the Indonesian province of East Timor (present-day Timor-Leste). One of two main tertiary institutions in East Timor during the Indonesian administration, along with Universitas Timor Timur (UNTIM), the Polytechnic offered two-year degrees in engineering, accounting, and business administration/secretarial studies. Its campus was located in Hera, around 5 kilometres (3.1 mi) east of the provincial capital, Dili.

In the late 1990s, the Dili Polytechnic was known as a hotbed of activism against the Indonesian occupation. Some students and lecturers also served as clandestine operatives (clandestinos) of Falintil, the armed wing of the Fretilin resistance party. Leading up to the August 1999 East Timorese independence referendum, Dili Polytechnic students played an active role in the pro-independence campaign. On 10 May 1999, the Indonesian Army and the Aitarak, a pro-Indonesia militia, attacked the Polytechnic, expelled the students and lecturers, and occupied the campus. Later that month, two students who returned to campus were tortured and killed by the Indonesians.

The Dili Polytechnic never reopened after the 1999 crisis. In 2000, faculty and administrators from the Polytechnic and UNTIM came together to merge the two former institutions into a new university, Universidade Nacional Timor Lorosa'e (UNTL). The former Polytechnic campus was rehabilitated in 2002–2003 to serve as the campus of the UNTL technical department. Today, the campus is home to UNTL's faculty of engineering, sciences, and technology.

== History ==
=== Founding and development ===
The Dili Polytechnic was constructed in 1989 at a cost of 8.9 billion rupiah (equivalent to 23.1 billion rupiah or US$1.42 million in 2025), funded by the Indonesian government. Described as a "showcase institution", it was established as part of Governor Mário Viegas Carrascalão's program to develop East Timor, then an Indonesian province. At its founding, it joined Universitas Timor Timur (UNTIM) as one of two main tertiary educational institutions in East Timor.

The Dili Polytechnic officially opened on 19 June 1990, offering two-year programs in three departments: mechanical engineering, civil engineering, and electrical engineering. Accounting and secretarial/business administration departments were added in the 1992–1993 academic year. That year, the school had 278 students, 36 lecturers, and 45 administrators and other staff. By October 1993, the polytechnic had graduated 92 students—27 in mechanical engineering, 32 in civil engineering, and 33 in electrical engineering. The school had around 800 students during the 1995–1996 academic year. In 1998–1999, the number of students had fallen to 450, taught by 160 lecturers, of whom 60 were native-born East Timorese. The polytechnic was upgraded in the 1990s with funding from Australian Aid.

=== Student resistance activity ===
In the 1990s, the Dili Polytechnic students were active in the movement against the Indonesian occupation of East Timor, often participating in demonstrations and other resistance activities. Some Polytechnic students and lecturers also served as clandestine operatives (clandestinos) associated with Falintil, the armed wing of the Fretilin resistance party, with whom they made contact through local residents of Hera living near campus. Unbeknownst to the school's Indonesian rector, activists hosted members of the resistance, including Catholic priests and representatives of Fretilin and Falintil, for secret meetings on campus. Falintil considered the Polytechnic a source of political and war strategy, drawing on the intellectual strengths of students and faculty.

On 14 November 1996, large crowds of students commemorated the fifth anniversary of the Santa Cruz massacre by marching from the UNTIM and Polytechnic campuses to the regional assembly building in Dili, where they threw stones and protested against the Indonesian government's targeting of Bishop Carlos Filipe Ximenes Belo. On 1 June 1998, Dili Polytechnic students participated in a free speech protest of 1,500 students at the UNTIM campus. On 23 November 1998, Dili Polytechnic students, dressed in their yellow uniform jackets, joined a pro-independence and peace protest which drew an estimated 5,000 students from all of Dili's senior high schools and tertiary institutions. On 14 December 1998, hundreds of students from the Dili Polytechnic, UNTIM, and the Dili economics school demonstrated in front of the regional assembly building, protesting oppression and violence against civilians by the Indonesian military.

=== 1999 crisis ===
Leading up to the August 1999 East Timorese independence referendum, students from the Dili Polytechnic and UNTIM played an active role in the pro-independence campaign. Suspicious of student activism and resistance activity at the Polytechnic, the Indonesian Army and pro-Indonesia militias, including the notorious Aitarak, began surveilling the campus in the spring of 1999. From 17 April 1999, the Kopassus special forces unit set up a post near the Polytechnic campus. Fearing violence, students and lecturers set up high-voltage electric fencing around the campus perimeter. On the morning of 22 April 1999, Aitarak commander Mateus de Carvalho invited Polytechnic teachers and students to meet on campus under false pretenses of holding a peace dialogue with the militia. Upon their arrival, Indonesian Mobile Brigade Corps officers and members of the Aitarak and Besi Merah Putih militias surrounded the group and arrested youths they believed were student activists at the Polytechnic, detaining them at an East Timor Regional Police facility.

On 10 May 1999, the Aitarak militia and the Indonesian military, including an elite Kopassus special forces unit, attacked the Dili Polytechnic. Arriving at 5 a.m., the soldiers and militiamen looted the homes of nearby residents before surrounding the campus, where they remained until 6 in the evening. Claiming that students were using school equipment to manufacture bombs and firearms and that they had hosted an on-campus meeting with Falantil in September 1998, the Indonesians ordered all those inside the campus to leave. The students, who had indeed been crafting weapons (though only rudimentary ones, such as bows and arrows using knives attached to sticks) in anticipation of a militia attack, were dissuaded by faculty members from fighting back. The students denied the charge of meeting on campus with Falantil members in September 1998, though meetings with Fretilin representatives did occur on other occasions. More than 300 lecturers and students were arrested and detained for three days before being released. Others were able to escape, including more than 30 students who made their way to a Falantil cantonment in Uai-Mori, Viqueque, and joined the guerrillas. Nearly two weeks after the attack, twenty students were still reported to be missing, some of whom may have gone into hiding.

From that point forward, the Aitarak and Indonesian military occupied the Dili Polytechnic campus until the August 1999 referendum, denying access to students and lecturers. On the afternoon of 20 May 1999, six Polytechnic students, including clandestine activists Agostinho de Carvalho and Estevão Pereira, were arrested upon entering campus to collect their personal belongings. In reality, da Costa and Pereira were attempting to retrieve some sensitive documents and photographs that they had hidden for Falantil guerrillas in a water tower prior to the 10 May attack. Four unidentified students were released, but Carvalho and Pereira were detained at a police facility before being tortured, killed, and buried in a secret location. In December 1999, relatives the two students learned of their burial location from a journalist, and their bodies were exhumed in July 2001 by their families. The men were buried together in a single grave, both in a sitting position with their hands bound in front.

In September 1999, following the referendum in which East Timorese voters opted for independence from Indonesia, pro-Indonesia militias unleashed a wave of violence, targeting civilians and destroying infrastructure as they withdrew from the country to West Timor. In and around Dili, educational institutions were a major target for destruction in what was known as the Scorched Earth Operation. The Indonesian military and militias set the Dili Polytechnic ablaze and looted much of its equipment, leaving the 80% of the campus destroyed.

=== Aftermath and legacy ===
The Dili Polytechnic, which had been closed since May 1999 and almost entirely destroyed during the 1999 crisis, never reopened as an independent institution. In March 2000, the East Timor Student Solidarity Council (ETSSC) established a resource center to provide study facilities for the displaced students of the Polytechnic and UNTIM, which had also been largely destroyed. Around the same time, Polytechnic and UNTIM lecturers and administrators began working, without pay, to organize a new university that would merge the two former institutions. With a $1.5 million grant from the UNTAET transitional government, the new Universidade Nacional Timor Lorosa'e (UNTL) was established, opening for classes in November 2000.

In December 2000, the UNTAET East Timor Transitional Cabinet agreed that the former Dili Polytechnic campus would be used as a basic training of the first battalion of the Timor-Leste Defence Force (F-FDTL), with the possibility that the facility would revert to its original educational use in the future. At that time, the campus was also being considered as a site for the future headquarters of the F-FDTL. In July 2002, work began on a $4.7 million project, funded by the Japanese government, to rehabilitate the former Dili Polytechnic to serve as the campus of the UNTL technical department. The campus was inaugurated on 12 August 2003 in a ceremony attended by President Xanana Gusmão and UNMISET head Kamalesh Sharma. Today, the campus is home to UNTL's faculty of engineering, sciences, and technology.

On 30 July 2022, a ceremony was held at the UNTL campus in Hera to pay tribute to the late Agostinho de Carvalho, one of the two Dili Polytechnic student activists who was killed by the Indonesians in 1999, before his remains were taken to his hometown in Viqueque. The ceremony was attended by UNTL rector João Soares Martins, former F-FDTL commander Lere Anan Timur, former cabinet minister and Polytechnic lecturer Inácio Moreira, and other officials and members of the university community. The remains of Estevão Pereira, the other student activist who was killed, had already been taken to his birthplace in Laga.

== Campus ==
The Dili Polytechnic campus was located in Hera, around 5 kilometres (3.1 mi) east of Dili, the provincial capital. Its 20-hectare (49-acre) campus included a two-story administration, classroom, and library building, workshops, student dormitories, faculty housing, a canteen, and a multipurpose building, as well as an experimental garden, forest, pool, and marine science station. In 1993, the library had a collection of 913 titles. The campus also contained football and softball fields, volleyball and tennis courts, and a swimming pool.

== Academics and administration ==
The Dili Polytechnic offers two-year degree programs in mechanical engineering, civil engineering, electrical engineering (some sources write electronic engineering), accounting, and secretarial studies and business administration. Government statistics showed that in 1999, 25 percent of students were studying administrative subjects. Few reports exist on the quality of education at the Dili Polytechnic or other tertiary education institutions in East Timor during the period in which it operated.

In 1993, G. R. Kermite was director of the Dili Polytechnic.

== Notable people ==
=== Faculty ===
- Inácio Moreira, member of parliament and cabinet minister; engineering lecturer at the Polytechnic

=== Alumni ===
- Faustino da Costa, commissioner-general of the National Police of Timor-Leste; attended 1994–1996

== See also ==
- List of universities in Timor-Leste
