= List of wars involving Thailand =

This is a list of wars involving the Kingdom of Thailand, its predecessor states, and by Siamese people, from antiquity to the present day. It also includes wars fought outside Thailand by the Thai military.

Thai victory
Thai defeat
Another result
Ongoing conflict

== Sukhothai Kingdom ==
Conflict	Combatant 1	Combatant 2	Results
Recapture of Sukhothai (c. 1238 ) Location: Sukhothai	Pho Khun Bang Klang Hao; Pho Khun Pha Mueang	Khom Sabat Khlon Lamphong	Victory: Bang Klang Hao declared King of Sukhothai as Sri Inthrabodinthrathit.
Battle of Chod (c. 1257) Location: Sukhothai	Prince Ram Khamhaeng	Khun Sam Chon	Victory: Repelled invaders; established Ram Khamhaeng's military prestige.
Territorial Expansion Wars (Late 13th Century) Location:Lampang, Phrae, Nan, Phitsanulok, Vientiane,Nakhon Si Thammarat Kingdom,Mon kingdoms and the Bay of Bengal The Sukhothai Kingdom at its greatest extent during the late 13th century under the reign of King Ram Khamhaeng	Sukhothai Kingdom	Hanthawaddy kingdom Nakhon Si Thammarat Kingdom; Muang Sua	Victory: Expanding its sphere of influence Under King Ram Khamhaeng the Great; Hanthawaddy kingdom and Nakhon Si Thammarat Kingdom become a Sukhothai Kingdom vassal state
The Sukhothai- Ayutthaya War (1350–1438) Location: Sukhothai	Sukhothai Kingdom	Ayutthaya Kingdom	Sukhothai lost: Sukhothai lost its southern territories (Phitsanulok and Kamphaeng Phet) and became a vassal state of Ayutthaya Kingdom eventually.

== Ayutthaya Kingdom ==
Conflict	Combatant 1	Combatant 2	Results
Fall of Angkor (1352-1431) Location: Angkor, Khmer Empire	Ayutthaya Kingdom	Khmer Empire	Siamese victory: Fall of the Khmer Empire
Ayutthaya–Lan Na War (1441–1474) Location: Northern Ayutthaya, Southern Lan Na Places listed in the Thai epic Yuan Phai, chronicling the conflict during c. 1474/75	Ayutthaya Kingdom	Kingdom of Lanna	Stalemate: Indraracha Died in the War.
Burmese–Siamese War (1547–1549) Location: Upper Tenessarim coast, western and central Siam Map of the 1548–1549 campaign	Ayutthaya Kingdom	Toungoo dynasty	Inconclusive
Burmese–Siamese War (1563–1564) Location: Ayutthaya, Phitsanulok, Sukhothai War elephants depicted from a later Siam–Burmese war. White war elephants such as these were the purported casus belli for the 1563–64 war.	Ayutthaya Kingdom	Toungoo dynasty: Sukhothai Kingdom; Lan Na Kingdom	Burmese victory: Ayutthaya becomes a Burmese vassal state
Burmese–Siamese War (1568–1569) Location: Ayutthaya, Phitsanulok, Lan Xang, and Kamphaeng Phet	Ayutthaya Kingdom; Lan Xang Kingdom	Toungoo dynasty: Sukhothai Kingdom; Lan Na Kingdom	Burmese victory
Burmese–Siamese War (1584–1593) Location: Ayutthaya Kingdom and lower Tanintharyi Region Elephant duel between Naresuan and Mingyi Swa during the Battle of Nong Sarai as wall murals in Phra Ubosot, Wat Suwan Dararam, Ayutthaya, Thailand.	Ayutthaya Kingdom	Toungoo dynasty	Siamese defensive victory: Siam gains independence
Siamese–Cambodian War (1591–1594) Location: Cambodia	Ayutthaya Kingdom	Kingdom of Cambodia Supported by: Spanish Empire; Kingdom of Portugal	Siamese victory: Cambodia become the Siamese vassal state
Cambodian–Spanish War (1593–99) Location: Cambodia	Cambodia Supported by Ayutthaya Kingdom; Johor Sultanate (Muslim Malay merchants); Kingdom of Champa (Muslim Cham merchants)	Spanish Empire: Spanish protectorate in Cambodia; Philippines; Mexican recruits; Kingdom of Portugal; Cambodian allies Japanese mercenaries	Siamese Victory: Cambodia remains as a Siamese vassal; Spanish Empire fails to make Cambodia a protectorate
Burmese–Siamese War (1593–1600) Location: Southern and central Burma Map showing Siam forces' advance towards Burma: Red: Siamese invasion in 1593 Brown: Siamese invasion and retreat in 1595 Yellow: Siamese invasion in 1599-1600	Ayutthaya Kingdom	Toungoo dynasty	Inconclusive, both sides claim victory: Naresuan managed to secure his kingdom's independence and regain some territories including Lan Na and Tanintharyi region but unable to achieve his primary objectives, capturing Pegu.; Siamese army had to withdraw due to logistical issues and an epidemic that broke out among the troops which led to Burmese defensive victory.; These campaigns were largely unsuccessful and led to heavy casualties on both sides and weakening both empires to some extent.
Burmese–Siamese War (1609–1622) Location: Tenessarim coast, Lanna	Ayutthaya Kingdom	Toungoo dynasty	Burmese defensive victory
Spanish-Siam War (1624–1636)	Ayutthaya Kingdom Dutch East India Company	(Spain) Iberian Union: (Spain) Crown of Castile; (Spain) Spanish East Indies; Council of Portugal: Macau; Goa; Malacca	Siamese victory: Dutch hegemony on Southeast Asia; 150 Spaniards killed
Burmese–Siamese War (1662–1664) Location: Lan Na, Northern Siam, Tenasserim coast and Burma	Ayutthaya Kingdom	Toungoo dynasty	Burmese defensive victory: Burma defends upper Burma; Status quo ante bellum
Burmese–Siamese War (1675–1676) Location: Tenasserim coast	Ayutthaya Kingdom	Toungoo dynasty	Military stalemate: Burma defends upper Tenasserim coast; Siam defeats counter Burmese invasion
Anglo-Siamese War (1687–1688) Location: Mergui and Coromandel coast	Ayutthaya Kingdom Governorship of Tenasserim and Siamese garrison of Mergui English defectors	England; East India Company	Inconclusive: Siam closed to Company traders; No peace treaty signed
Siege of Bangkok (June 1688–November 13, 1688) Location: Bangkok, Thailand Siege of the French fortress (A) by Siamese troops and batteries (C), in Bangkok, 1688. The enclosure of the village of Bangkok represented in the lower left corner (M) is today's Thonburi.	Ayutthaya Kingdom; Naval support by: Dutch East India Company	Kingdom of France: (Kingdom of France) French East India Company	Decisive Siamese victory
Burmese–Siamese War (1700–1701) Location: Ayutthaya Kingdom	Ayutthaya Kingdom	Toungoo dynasty	Siamese defensive victory: Siam defeats Burmese invasion
Siamese–Vietnamese War (1717) Location: Cambodia	Ayutthaya Kingdom	Nguyễn lords	Siamese victory: Siam gains suzerainty of Cambodia; Vietnam annexes several border provinces of Cambodia
Burmese–Siamese War (1759–1760) Location: Tenasserim coast, Gulf of Siam coast, Suphanburi, Ayutthaya A map of the Burmese-Siamese War (1759-1760)	Ayutthaya Kingdom	Konbaung dynasty	Inconclusive: Burmese gained Dawei and upper Tenasserim but failed to capture Ayutthaya.
Burmese–Siamese War (1765–1767) Location: Tenasserim, Siam Sketch-map showing Burmese forces' advance towards Ayutthaya: The territories shown are those at the time being; Siam; Burma and its vassals; Third territories; Routes of advance (main attack routes shown in A and C); Present-day border	Ayutthaya Kingdom	Konbaung dynasty	Burmese victory: Burma temporarily captures most of Ayutthaya's major cities; by 1770, only Tenasserim remains under Burmese control

== Thonburi Kingdom ==
Conflict	Combatant 1	Combatant 2	Results	Notable battles
Thonburi reunification of Siam (1767–1771) Location: Siam Map of the five Siamese states (including their capital cities) that emerged following the dissolution of the Ayutthaya Kingdom in 1767	Thonburi Kingdom	Phimai clique Phitsanulok clique Sawangkhaburi clique Nakhon Si Thammarat clique Principality of Banteay Mas; Konbaung Dynasty	Thonburi victory: Reunification of Siam under the Thonburi Kingdom.	
Siamese–Vietnamese War (1771–1773) Location: Cambodia, Southern Vietnam Siamese invasion of Cambodia and Hà Tiên in 1771 and Vietnamese counter-offensives in 1772; Red represents the Siamese. Yellow and Brown represent Cambodia and the Nguyen Lord of Cochinchina.	Thonburi Kingdom	Đàng Trong (Nguyễn Lords); Kingdom of Cambodia; Hà Tiên polity	Siamese victory	
Siamese conquest of Lan Na (1774–1775) Location: Lan Na	Thonburi Kingdom	Konbaung dynasty	Siamese victory: Southern parts of Lanna, including Chiangmai, Lampang and Lamphun, became Siamese vassals	
Burmese–Siamese War (1775–1776) Location: Hua Mueang Nuea or Northern Siam, Central Siam and Lan Na Map of Maha Thiha Thura's Invasion of Siam in 1775 – 1776. Green represents Burmese army routes. Red represents Siamese army routes.	Thonburi Kingdom	Konbaung dynasty	Siamese victory: Depopulation of Northern Cities and destruction of Phitsanulok	Battle of Bangkaeo (1775)
Lao–Siamese War (1778–1779) Location: Khorat Plateau and Laos Blue represents Vientiane and Champasak. Red represents the Siamese and allies.	Thonburi Kingdom; Kingdom of Luang Phrabang; Oudong Kingdom	Kingdom of Vientiane; Kingdom of Champasak	Siamese victory: Lao kingdoms of Luang Phrabang, Vientiane and Champasak came under Siamese suzerainty.	
The rebellion of Phraya San (1781–1782) Location: Thonburi	Thonburi Kingdom	Phraya San	Phraya San's forces was defeated: General Rama I easily crushed Phraya San's forces and took control of the capital.; Deposition of King Taksin and the rise of Rama I, establishing the Chakri dynasty.	

== Rattanakosin Kingdom ==
Conflict	Combatant 1	Combatant 2	Results	Notable battles
Siamese–Vietnamese War (1784–1785) Location: Rạch Gầm River and Xoài Mút River (near Mỹ Tho River, in present-day Tiền Giang Province, southern Vietnam)	Rattanakosin Kingdom; Kingdom of Cambodia; Nguyễn lords Hà Tiên Protectorate	Tây Sơn	Tây Sơn defensive victory: Siamese-Cambodian armies retreat back to Laos	
Burmese–Siamese War (1785–1786) Location: Western, Northern and Southern Siam, Lan Na Green represents Burmese routes. Red represents Siamese routes.	Rattanakosin Kingdom; Lanna Kingdom	Konbaung dynasty	Siamese defensive victory: Portions of Western Siam depopulated until the 1870s	Tha Din Daeng Campaign (1786)
Tavoy campaign (1788) Location:Tenasserim Coast The advance of the Siamese elephant-mounted forces along the Banthat Range, painted by Hem Vejakorn.	Rattanakosin Kingdom	Konbaung dynasty	Burmese defensive victory	
Burmese–Siamese War (1792–1794) Location:Tenasserim Coast Map of the Burmese–Siamese War of 1792 through 1794	Rattanakosin Kingdom	Konbaung dynasty	Burmese victory: Tenasserim remained within the Burmese sphere of influence, Tenasserim Coast depopulated	
Burmese–Siamese War (1797–1798) Location: Lanna Kingdom, Northern Thailand Map of the Burmese–Siamese War of 1797 through 1798)	Rattanakosin Kingdom; Kingdom of Chiang Mai; Kingdom of Vientiane	Konbaung dynasty	Siamese defensive victory: Siam gained Lan Na as vassals	
Burmese–Siamese War (1802–1805) Location: Northern Thailand, Kengtung, Sipsongpanna Burmese–Siamese Wars in Lanna in 1797–1798, 1802–1803 and 1804 Siamese invasions of Chiang Tung (1802) and Chiang Hung (1805) Green depicts the Burmese. Red depicts the Siamese.	Rattanakosin Kingdom (Siam); Chiang Mai (tributary to Siam); Kingdom of Vientiane (tributary to Siam)	Konbaung dynasty	Siamese victory: Forced relocation of Tai Khuen and Tai Lue people to Siam; Siam gained control of Chiang Saen	
Burmese–Siamese War (1809–1812) Location: Phuket	Rattanakosin Kingdom	Konbaung dynasty	Siamese victory: Siam successfully defends Phuket from a Burmese invasion; Tenasserim Coast is depopulated	
Cambodian rebellion (1811–1812) Location: Cambodia, Southern Vietnam	Rattanakosin Kingdom	Cambodian pro-Vietnamese faction Nguyễn dynasty	Cambodian anti Siamese victory Vietnamese forces restore Ang Chan to the Cambodian throne	
Siamese invasion of Kedah (1821) Location: Kedah	Rattanakosin Kingdom	Kedah Sultanate	Siamese victory: Exile of Ahmad Tajuddin Halim Shah II; Imposition of direct Siamese rule on Kedah; Start of the Kedahan resistance	
First Anglo-Burmese War (1824-1826) Location: Burma, East Bengal, Manipur The storming of one of the principal stockades, near Yangon (Rangoon), 8 July 1824	(United Kingdom) British Empire: East India Company; Supported by: Rattanakosin Kingdom	Konbaung dynasty	Siamese-allied victory: Treaty of Yandabo; Beginning of British rule in Burma; Burma cedes Manipur and Tenasserim to Britain	
Lao rebellion (1826–1828) Location: Central Laos	Rattanakosin Kingdom	Kingdom of Vientiane; Kingdom of Champasak; Military support: Nguyễn dynasty	Siamese victory	
Siamese–Vietnamese War (1831–1835) Location: Cambodia, Southern Vietnam	Rattanakosin Kingdom	Nguyễn dynasty	Vietnamese victory: Cambodia becomes a vassal state of Vietnam	
Cambodian rebellion (1840) Location: Cambodia, Cochinchina	Khmer anti-Vietnamese rebels Support: Rattanakosin Kingdom	Nguyễn dynasty	Siamese-allied Victory Siamese intervention Cambodia independence from Vietnam; Cambodia came under joint Siamese-Vietnamese suzerainty	
Siamese–Vietnamese War (1841–1845) Location: Cambodia, Southern Vietnam A map showing the movement of Vietnamese troops (from June to December 1845) in Vietnam-Siamese War (1841–1845).	Rattanakosin Kingdom; Khmer anti-Vietnamese rebels	Nguyễn dynasty	Stalemate: Cambodia came under joint Siamese-Vietnamese suzerainty	
Burmese–Siamese War (1849–1855) Location: Kengtung, Trans-Salween region	Rattanakosin Kingdom	Konbaung dynasty	Burmese defensive victory	
Haw wars (1865–1890) Location: Eastern Cambodia, A Siamese army during Haw wars in 1865	Kingdom of Siam: Luang Phrabang	Haw Rebels (Red flag and Striped flag bands)	Siamese victory	
Franco-Siamese conflict (1893) Location: French Indochina, Siam French ships Inconstant and Comète under fire in the Paknam incident, 13 July 1893	Kingdom of Siam	(French Third Republic) French Republic: French Indochina	French victory; Land on east bank of the Mekong ceded to French Indochina	Paknam incident (1893)
Ngiao rebellion(1902) Location: Phrae	Kingdom of Siam	Shan (Ngiao) rebels	Siamese victory	
World War I (1917-1918) Location: Europe (Decapitation Boonpeng 1919) (Clockwise from the top): The aftermath of shelling during the Battle of the Somme; Mark V tanks cross the Hindenburg Line; HMS Irresistible sinks after hitting a mine in the Dardanelles; A British Vickers machine gun crew wears gas masks during the Battle of the Somme; Albatros D.III fighters of Jagdstaffel 11	Allied Powers: France; British Empire; Russia (1914–17); Serbia; Belgium; Montenegro; Japan; Italy (1915–18); United States (1917–18); Romania (1916–18); Portugal (1916–18); Hejaz (1916–18); Brazil (1917–18); China (1917–18); Greece (1917–18); Siam (1917–18); ... and others	Central Powers: German Empire; Austria-Hungary; Ottoman Empire; Bulgaria (1915–18); ... and co-belligerents	Siamese-allied victory: Central Powers victory on the Eastern Front nullified by defeat on the Western Front; Fall of all continental empires in Europe (including Germany, Russia, Turkey and Austria-Hungary); Russian Revolution and Russian Civil War – the collapse of the Russian Empire and the subsequent formation of the Soviet Union; Widespread unrest and revolutions throughout Europe and Asia; Creation of the League of Nations (more ...)	Siamese occupation of Germany

== After 1932 revolution ==
Conflict	Combatant 1	Combatant 2	Results	Notable battles
Boworadet Rebellion (1933) Location: Central Thailand, Nakhon Ratchasima, Lak Si and Ratchaburi	Siam; People's Party	Rebel faction led by Prince Boworadet	People's Party Victory: Suppression of the rebellion, consolidation of power by the People's Party	
Franco-Thai War (1940-1941) Location: French Indochina French Indochina	Thailand	Vichy France: French Indochina	Thai victory: Japanese-mediated armistice; Siem Reap, Phra Tabong, Sisophon ceded to Thailand	Battle of Ko Chang (1941); Battle of Banphlao (1941)
Japanese invasion of Thailand (1941) Location:Thailand Map of the Japanese invasion of Thailand, December 8, 1941	Thailand	(Empire of Japan) Japan	Ceasefire Thai alliance with Japan: Thailand declares war on the Allied Powers.	Battle of Prachuap Khiri Khan (1941)
World War II (1941-1945) Location: Southeast Asia (clockwise from top left)	Axis Powers: Germany; Japan; Italy (1940-45); Hungary (1941-45); Romania (1941-45); Bulgaria (1941-45); Croatia (1941-45); Slovak Republic; Finland; Thailand (1941-45); Manchukuo; Mengjiang	Allied Powers: United States (1941-45); United Kingdom; Soviet Union (1941-45); China; France; Poland; Canada; Australia; New Zealand; India; South Africa; Yugoslavia (1941-45); Greece (1940-45); Denmark (1940-45); Norway (1940-45); Netherlands (1940-45); Belgium (1940-45); Luxembourg (1940-45); Czechoslovakia; Brazil (1942-45); Mexico (1942-45); Philippines (1941-45); Ethiopia; Free Thai Movement	Allied victory: Collapse of Nazi Germany; Fall of the Japanese and Italian Empires; Allied occupations of Germany and Japan and foundation of the Italian Republic; Beginning of the Nuclear Age; Dissolution of the League of Nations and creation of the United Nations; Emergence of the United States and the Soviet Union as rival superpowers and beginning of the Cold War (more ...)	Air Battle over Lampang (1944)
Malayan Emergency (1948-1960) Location: Malay Peninsula, Southeast Asia ( Dusun Nyor Rebellion 1948 ) Australian Avro Lincoln bomber dropping 500lb bombs on communist rebels in the Malayan jungle (c. 1950)	Commonwealth forces: United Kingdom: Federation of Malaya; Southern Rhodesia (until 1953); Rhodesia and Nyasaland (after 1953); Fiji; Australia (New Zealand) New Zealand; Supported by: Thailand (Thai–Malaysian border)	Communist forces: Malayan Communist Party: Malayan National Liberation Army; Supported by: China; Viet Minh (until 1954); North Vietnam (from 1954); Soviet Union; Indonesia	Thailand-allied victory: Independence of Malaya on 31 August 1957	
Korean War (1950-1953) Location: Korean Peninsula, Yellow Sea, Sea of Japan, Korea Strait, China–North Korea border Clockwise from top: A column of the U.S. 1st Marine Division's infantry and armor moves through Chinese lines during their breakout from the Chosin Reservoir • UN landing at Incheon harbor, starting point of the Battle of Incheon • Korean refugees in front of a U.S. M46 Patton tank • U.S. Marines, led by First Lieutenant Baldomero Lopez, landing at Incheon • F-86 Sabre fighter aircraft	South Korea United Nations (Note: On 9 July 1951 troop constituents were: US: 70.4%, ROK: 23.3% other UNC: 6.3%): United States; United Kingdom; Canada; Turkey; Australia; Philippines; New Zealand; Thailand; Ethiopia; Greece; France; Colombia; Belgium; South Africa; Netherlands; Luxembourg; Medical support: Denmark; Italy; West Germany; India; Israel; Norway; Sweden; Other support: Taiwan; Japan; Cuba; El Salvador; Spain	North Korea; China; Soviet Union; Medical support: Bulgaria; Czechoslovakia; East Germany; Hungary; Poland; Romania; Other support: India{; Mongolia	Military stalemate: North Korean invasion of South Korea repelled; Subsequent U.S.-led United Nations invasion of North Korea repelled; Subsequent Chinese invasion of South Korea repelled; Korean Armistice Agreement signed in 1953; Korean conflict ongoing; Korean Demilitarized Zone established; North Korea gains city of Kaesong but loses a net total of 3,900 km^{2} (1,500 sq mi) to South Korea.	
Vietnam War (1955-1975) Location: South Vietnam, North Vietnam, Cambodia, Laos, South China Sea, Gulf of Thailand Clockwise, from top left: U.S. combat operations in Ia Đrăng, ARVN Rangers defending Saigon during the 1968 Tết Offensive, two A-4C Skyhawks after the Gulf of Tonkin incident, ARVN recapture Quảng Trị during the 1972 Easter Offensive, civilians fleeing the 1972 Battle of Quảng Trị, and burial of 300 victims of the 1968 Huế Massacre.	South Vietnam; United States; South Korea; Australia; New Zealand; Laos; Cambodia (1967–1970); Khmer Republic (1970–75); Thailand; Philippines; Supported by: Taiwan; Brazil; Malaysia	North Vietnam; Viet Cong and PRG; Pathet Lao; GRUNK (1970–75); Khmer Rouge; China; Soviet Union; North Korea; Supported by: Czechoslovakia; Cuba; East Germany; Poland; Romania; Hungary; Bulgaria; Sweden	North Vietnamese and National Liberation Front victory: Withdrawal of U.S. forces from Vietnam; Communist forces take power in South Vietnam, Cambodia and Laos; Reunification of Vietnam; Start of the Cambodian–Vietnamese War; Start of the boat people crisis and Indochina refugee crisis; Reunification of North and South Vietnam into the Socialist Republic of Vietnam.	
Laotian Civil War (1959-1975) Location: Kingdom of Laos Laos	Kingdom of Laos; Forces Armées Neutralistes (from 1962); United States; South Vietnam; Thailand Supported by: Philippines; Taiwan; Australia; New Zealand	Pathet Lao; Forces Armées Neutralistes (1960–1962); Patriotic Neutralists (from 1963); North Vietnam Supported by: China; Soviet Union; Romania	Pathet Lao and North Vietnamese victory: Establishment of the Lao People's Democratic Republic; Exile of the Kingdom of Laos.	
Communist insurgency in Thailand (1965–1983) Location: Thailand (primarily East Thailand) Ta Ko Bi Cave, a former hideout used by communist rebels.	Thailand: Royal Thai Armed Forces; Royal Thai Police; Volunteer Defense Corps; Supported by: Republic of China (until July 1981): Kuomintang 49th Division; United States	Communist Party of Thailand Pathet Lao Supported By: Khmer Rouge (until 1982); Vietnam; China (from 1979); Soviet Union	Thai government victory: Amnesty declared on 23 April 1980 by the Thai government; Order 66/2523 signed by Prime Minister Prem Tinsulanonda; Communist insurgency declines and ends in 1984	
Cambodian Civil War (1968-1975) Location: Cambodia US tanks entering a town in Cambodia in 1970.	Cambodia (1967–1970); Khmer Republic (1970–1975); United States; South Vietnam Other support: Australia; Canada; France; Malaysia; Singapore; Thailand	GRUNK (1970–1975): FUNK; Khmer Rouge (1968–1975); Khmer Rumdo; North Vietnam; Việt Cộng Other support: China; Cuba; Czechoslovakia; Romania; Soviet Union	Khmer Rouge victory: Fall of the Kingdom of Cambodia; Creation, then collapse, of the Khmer Republic; Establishment of Democratic Kampuchea; Beginning of the Cambodian genocide	
Communist insurgency in Malaysia (1968-1989) Location: Peninsular Malaysia and Sarawak Sarawak Rangers (present-day part of the Malaysian Rangers) consisting of Ibans leap from a Royal Australian Air Force Bell UH-1 Iroquois helicopter to guard the Malay–Thai border from potential Communist attacks in 1965, two years before the war starting in 1968.	Anti-communist forces: Malaysia; Thailand Supported by: United Kingdom; Australia; New Zealand; United States; South Vietnam (until 1975)	Communist forces: Malayan Communist Party: Malayan National Liberation Army; Communist Party of Thailand (until 1983); Supported by: China; Soviet Union; Vietnam (until late 1970s); North Kalimantan Communist Party	Peace agreement reached: Communists agree to a ceasefire; Peace Agreement of Hat Yai 1989 signed between the communists and the governments of Malaysia and Thailand; Dissolution of the Malayan Communist Party (MCP)	
Third Indochina War (1978–1991); Location: Vietnam, Laos, Cambodia, Thailand, China Map of the Third Indochina war in 1979	China; Democratic Kampuchea (until 1979/82); CGDK (after 1982): PDK; FUNCINPEC; KPNLF; Lao royalists Hmong insurgents FULRO; Thailand Supported by: Malaysia; North Korea; Romania; Somalia National United Front for the Liberation of Vietnam (1980-1987)	Vietnam; Laos; People's Republic of Kampuchea (until 1989); State of Cambodia (from 1989); Supported by: Albania; Bulgaria; Cuba; Czechoslovakia; East Germany; Hungary; India; Poland; Soviet Union; Derg (1978–1987); PDRE (from 1987); South Yemen Communist Party of Thailand Supported by: Malayan Communist Party	1991 Paris Peace Accords: Insurgency in Laos; Removal of the Khmer Rouge from power; End of the Cambodian genocide; Pro-Vietnamese government installed in Cambodia; China withdraws from Vietnam after 27 days of fighting; Communist Party of Thailand abandons armed struggle; Vietnam withdraws from Cambodia in 1989; 1990 Chengdu summit leads to the normalization of relations between China and Vietnam; Restoration of the House of Norodom in Cambodia; Establishment of United Nations Transitional Authority in Cambodia; Vietnam, Laos and Cambodia join ASEAN in the late 1990s.	
Vietnamese border raids in Thailand (1979–1989) Location: Thai–Cambodian border, Gulf of Thailand	Thailand; CGDK: PDK (Khmer Rouge); KPNLF; FUNCINPEC; Supported by: China	Vietnam; People's Republic of Kampuchea (1979–89); State of Cambodia (1989); Supported by: Soviet Union; Poland; Czechoslovakia; East Germany	Vietnamese withdrew: Destruction of numerous guerrilla bases and refugee camps along the Thai–Cambodian border; Isolated outbreaks of open hostility between Vietnamese and Thai troops; Withdrawal of Vietnamese troops from the border in 1989	
Thai–Laotian Border War (1987-1988) Location: Chat Trakan District, Phitsanulok Province, Thailand; Botene District, Sainyabuli Province, Lao PDR Noen 1428 (Hill 1428), the battlefield of Thai–Laotian Border War of 1988, view from Phu Soidao National Park, Chat Trakan, Phitsanulok.	Thailand	Laos; Vietnam	Peace talks in Bangkok: Return to status quo ante bellum	
1999 East Timorese crisis (1999-2002) Location: East Timor Destroyed houses in Dili	(Timor-Leste) East Timor International Force: Australia; New Zealand; Thailand; Brazil; Canada; Fiji; France; Germany; (Republic of Ireland) Ireland; Italy; Jordan; Kenya; Malaysia; Norway; Pakistan; Philippines; Portugal; Singapore; South Korea; United Kingdom; United States	Insurgents: (Indonesia) Pro-Indonesian Militias; Aitarak; Besi Merah Putih; Laksaur; Mahidi	Conflict ended: Defeat of pro-Indonesian militia; Stabilisation of East Timor	
Iraq War (2003–2004); Location: Iraq Iraq War montage	Invasion phase (2003); United States; United Kingdom; Australia; Poland; Peshmerga; INC; Supported by: Denmark; Netherlands; Italy; Spain; Post-invasion (2003–11) Iraq; United States; United Kingdom MNF–I (2003–09): United States (2003–09); United Kingdom (2003–09); Australia (2003–09); Turkey (2003–08); Romania (2003–09); Azerbaijan (2003–08); Kuwait (2003–08); Estonia (2003–09); El Salvador (2003–09); Bulgaria (2003–08); Moldova (2003–08); Albania (2003–08); Ukraine (2003–08); Denmark (2003–08); Czech Republic (2003–08); South Korea (2003–08); Singapore (2003–08); Bosnia and Herzegovina (2003–08); North Macedonia (2003–08); Latvia (2003–08); Poland (2003–08); Kazakhstan (2003–08); Mongolia (2003–08); Georgia (2003–08); Tonga (2004–08); Japan (2004–08); Armenia (2005–08); Slovakia (2003–07); Lithuania (2003–07); Italy (2003–06); Norway (2003–06); Hungary (2003–05); Netherlands (2003–05); Portugal (2003–05); New Zealand (2003–04); Thailand (2003–04); Philippines (2003–04); Honduras (2003–04); Dominican Republic (2003–04); Spain (2003–04); Nicaragua (2003–04); Iceland (2003–04); Awakening Council Supported by: Iran: Artesh; Iraqi Kurdistan: Peshmerga	Invasion phase (2003); Iraq Ansar al-Islam (Note: against both Iraq and the United States); Post-invasion (2003–11); Ba'ath loyalists: SCJL; (Ba'athist Iraq) JRTN; Sunni insurgents: AQI (2004–06); ISI (from 2006); IAI; Ansar al-Sunnah (2003–07); Others; Shia insurgents: Mahdi Army; Special Groups; Asa'ib Ahl al-Haq; Others; Supported by: Iran: IRGC; Quds Force	Thailand-allied victory: Invasion and occupation of Iraq; Defeat of Ba'ath Party-led regime and execution of Saddam Hussein; Iraqi insurgency, emergence of al-Qaeda in Iraq, and civil war; Subsequent depletion of Iraqi insurgency, improvements in public security; Establishment of democratic elections and formation of new Shia led government; U.S.–Iraq Status of Forces Agreement; Withdrawal of U.S. troops from Iraq; Rise of Iraqi insurgency after U.S. withdrawal and spillover with the Syrian Civil War; Resurgence of al-Qaeda in Iraq and Syria	
South Thailand insurgency (2004 –present); Location: Southern Thailand (Songkhla, Pattani, Yala and Narathiwat) Souththailandmap	Thailand RTARF RTP Support: Malaysia; Indonesia; Qatar; Bahrain; Turkey; Germany; New Zealand (forensic science); Australia (intelligence support); Russia (intelligence support); Canada (mine clearance); USA (CIA, EOD, K-9)	BRN; RKK; GMIP; BIPP; PULO; Jemaah Islamiyah Former support: Aceh (until 2005); Mayaki Cartel (financial support); Islamic State: East Asia Province (minimal presence) Drug cartels; Mayaki Cartel; Xaysana Cartel; Usman Cartel; Oil smugglers Pirates	On going :low-level insurgency continues	
2008–2011 Cambodian–Thai border crisis Location: Thai–Cambodian border Phraviharngopura	Thailand	Cambodia	Military stalemate: Cambodian diplomatic victory; Icj awards Preah vehear to Cambodia; Both sides have agreed to withdraw their troops from a disputed border area near the ancient temple of Preah Vihear.	
2025 Cambodian–Thai border crisis Location: Cambodia–Thailand border Map of Cambodia with its border with Thailand marked in red	Thailand	Cambodia	Ceasefire: The Royal Thai Armed Forces conducted operations to push back opposing forces and retake sovereign territory totaling approximately 20.8 km² along the Thai-Cambodian border; key areas included Ban Nong Chan, Ban Nong Ya Kaeo, Ban Khlong Phaeng, etc.	
