= International Force East Timor =

Multinational peacemaking taskforce

- Part of the Indonesian invasion of East Timor and the 1999 East Timorese crisis and the Indonesian occupation of East Timor and the East Timor genocide
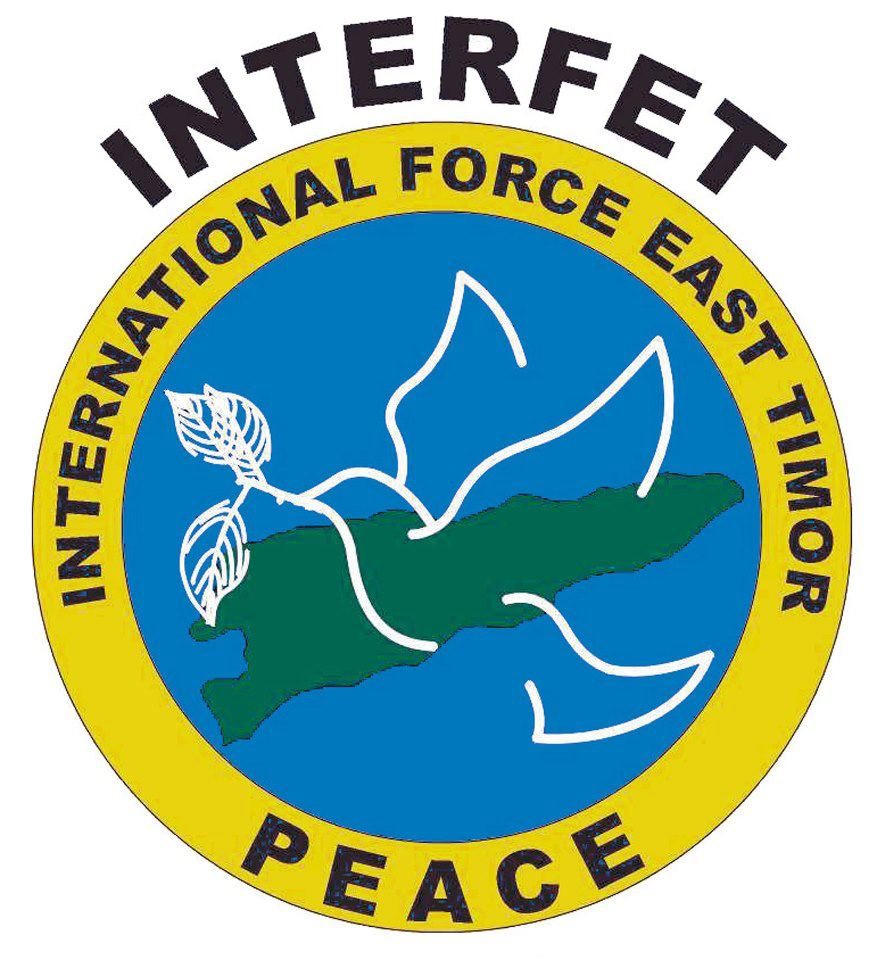
- Logo of INTERFET
Date	20 September 1999 – 28 February 2000
Location	East Timor
Result	Defeat of pro-Indonesian militia; Stabilisation of East Timor; Succeeded by United Nations peacekeeping mission UNTAET

Participants
International Force: Australia; New Zealand; Malaysia; Thailand; Bangladesh; Brazil; Canada; Denmark; Egypt; Fiji; France; Germany; Ireland; Italy; Jordan; Kenya; Norway; Philippines; Portugal; Singapore; South Korea; United Kingdom; United States	Militia: (Indonesia) Pro-Indonesian Militias; Aitarak; Besi Merah Putih; Laksaur; Mahidi

Commanders and leaders
(Australia) Peter Cosgrove; (Thailand) Songkitti Jaggabatara	(Indonesia) Wiranto; (Indonesia) Eurico Guterres

Strength
11,500 personnel (at the peak of deployment): (Australia) 5,500; (New Zealand) 1,200; (Malaysia) 899	Unknown

Casualties and losses
- (Australia) 2 killed; (New Zealand) 1 killed

The International Force East Timor (INTERFET) was a multinational non-United Nations peacemaking task force, organised and led by Australia in accordance with United Nations resolutions to address the humanitarian and security crisis that took place in East Timor from 1999–2000 until the arrival of UN peacekeepers. INTERFET was commanded by an Australian military officer, Major General Peter Cosgrove.

== Background ==
Indonesia invaded East Timor in 1975 and annexed the former Portuguese colony. The East Timorese resistance movement Falintil resisted the annexation. The annexation by Indonesia was not recognised by the United Nations, but was recognised by one state, Australia, in 1979. Cold War security concerns were emphasised, while foreign powers also placed high importance on good relations with Indonesia and were largely reluctant to assist a push for independence as a result. However, following the fall of long-serving Indonesian President Suharto, the new president, B. J. Habibie, was prepared to grant East Timor special autonomy.

In late 1998, the Australian prime minister, John Howard, with his foreign minister, Alexander Downer, drafted a letter to Habibie supporting the idea of autonomy but incorporating a suggestion that the long-term issue of East Timorese self-determination could best be defused by providing the East Timorese with an opportunity for a plebiscite after a substantial period of autonomy. The explicit comparison was with the Matignon Accords involving France and New Caledonia. The letter upset Habibie, who saw it as implying Indonesia was a "colonial power", and he decided in response to announce a snap referendum to be conducted within six months.

News of the proposal provoked a violent reaction from pro-Indonesian militia in East Timor. The Indonesian army did not intervene to restore order. At a summit in Bali, Howard told Habibie that a United Nations peacekeeping force should oversee the process. Habibie rejected the proposal, believing it would have insulted the Indonesian military.

== East Timorese independence referendum ==
The United Nations Mission in East Timor (UNAMET) was established to organise and conduct a referendum on the question of independence. It was composed of police and observers rather than military personnel. The UN-sponsored referendum held on 30 August 1999 showed overwhelming approval for East Timorese independence from Indonesia. After the result was announced on 4 September, violent clashes, instigated by a suspected anti-independence militia, sparked a humanitarian and security crisis in the region, with Xanana Gusmão calling for a UN peacekeeping force the same day. Many East Timorese were killed, with as many as 500,000 displaced and around half fleeing the territory.

On 6 September, Operation Spitfire commenced with Royal Australian Air Force (RAAF) C-130 Hercules aircraft evacuating UNAMET staff, foreign nationals and refugees, including Bishop Belo, to Darwin from Dili and Baucau airfields with protection provided by unarmed Special Air Service Regiment (SASR) soldiers.

== United Nations resolution ==
The violence was met with widespread public anger in Australia, Portugal and elsewhere, and activists in Portugal, Australia, the United States and other nations pressured their governments to take action. Australia's Opposition Spokesman on Foreign Affairs, Laurie Brereton, was vocal in highlighting evidence of the Indonesian military's involvement in pro-integrationist violence and advocated United Nations peacekeeping to support the East Timor's ballot. The Catholic Church in Australia urged the Australian Government to send an armed peacekeeping force to East Timor to end the violence. Protests occurred outside the Indonesia Consulate in Darwin and the Indonesian Embassy in Canberra.

The Australian prime minister, John Howard, gained the support of United Nations Secretary-General Kofi Annan and U.S. President Bill Clinton for an Australian-led international peacekeeping force to enter East Timor to end the violence. On 12 September, Clinton announced:

[T]he Indonesian military has aided and abetted militia violence in East Timor, in violation of the commitment of its leaders to the international community. This has allowed the militias to murder innocent people, to send thousands fleeing for their lives, to attack the United Nations compound. The United States has suspended all military cooperation, assistance, and sales to Indonesia ... The Indonesian Government and military must not only stop what they are doing but reverse course. They must halt the violence not just in Dili but throughout the nation. They must permit humanitarian assistance and let the U.N. mission do its job ... We are ready to support an effort led by Australia to mobilize a multinational force to help to bring security to East Timor under U.N. auspice ... the eyes of the world are on that tiny place and on those poor innocent, suffering people.

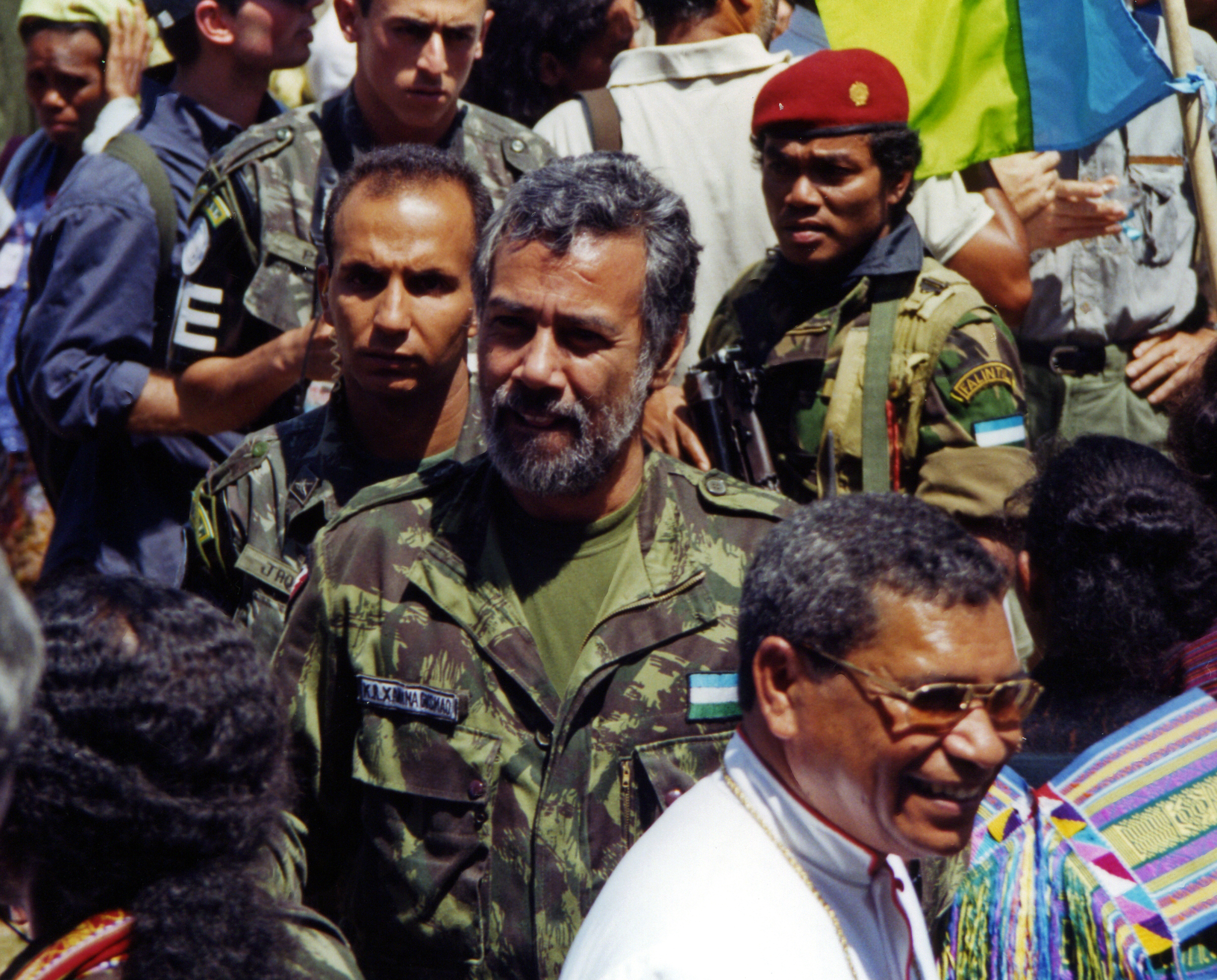
Return of Xanana Gusmão from Indonesian prison (1999)

Indonesia, in dire economic straits, relented. Under international pressure to allow an international peacekeeping force, President B.J. Habibie announced on 12 September that he would do so. He told a press conference:

A couple of minutes ago I called the United Nations Secretary General, Mr Kofi Annan, to inform about our readiness to accept international peacekeeping forces through the United Nations, from friendly nations, to restore peace and security in East Timor.

On 15 September 1999, the United Nations Security Council expressed concern at the deteriorating situation in East Timor and issued its Resolution 1264 calling for a multinational force to restore peace and security to East Timor, to protect and support the United Nations mission there, and to facilitate humanitarian assistance operations until such time as a United Nations peacekeeping force could be approved and deployed in the area. The resolution also welcomed Australia's letter to accept the leadership of a proposed multinational force in East Timor and to make a substantial contribution to the force itself.

== Military operations ==
The lead-up to the operation remained politically and militarily tense. The Royal Australian Air Force (RAAF) re-deployed frontline combat aircraft—F/A-18s and F-111s—northward to Tindal in the Northern Territory to act as a deterrent against escalation of the conflict by the Indonesian military and provide close air support and air defence in support of the landing if required. P-3C Orion maritime patrol aircraft were also deployed. At peak strength the RAAF aerial support assets available to INTERFET included 10 F-111s, 12 F/A-18s, five P-3C Orions, three B707 aerial refuelling tankers, two B200 King Airs, three PC-9A forward control aircraft, and a Falcon F900 VIP jet. Also in support was a significant airlift group, with Australian transport aircraft including thirteen C-130 Hercules and three DHC-4 Caribou. New Zealand deployed C-130 Hercules, Bell UH-1H Hueys, and A-4K Skyhawks to RAAF Base Tindal to support RAAF F-111s. In addition, a number of British, United States, Canadian, French and Thai aircraft were also deployed. On at least one occasion Australian P-3C aircraft were intercepted by Indonesian aircraft, while an Indonesian submarine was also detected by Coalition surveillance within the vicinity of Dili Harbour as INTERFET forces approached. Ultimately no serious incidents occurred and the intervention was successful; however, Australia–Indonesia relations would take several years to recover.

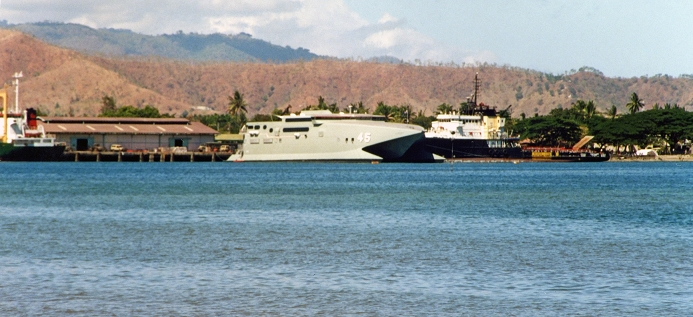
HMAS Jervis Bay in Dili in October 1999

Of the 22 nations involved in INTERFET, 10 provided naval assets. Australia was the single largest provider, with 14 ships deployed with INTERFET between 19 September 1999 and 23 February 2000: the frigates Adelaide, Anzac, Darwin, Sydney, Newcastle, and Melbourne; the landing ship Tobruk, the landing craft Balikpapan, Brunei, Labuan, Tarakan, and Betano; the fast transport Jervis Bay; and the replenishment vessel Success. The United States contributed seven ships: the cruiser Mobile Bay; the amphibious assault ships Belleau Wood, Peleliu, and Juneau; and the replenishment ships Kilauea, San Jose, and Tippecanoe. France supplied four vessels: the frigates Vendémiaire and Prairial plus the landing ships Siroco and Jacques Cartier. Singapore contributed the amphibious landing ships Excellence, Intrepid, and Perseverance. New Zealand deployed the frigates Te Kaha and Canterbury and the replenishment ship Endeavour. Other naval vessels deployed during the operation included the Canadian replenishment ship Protecteur, the Italian amphibious assault ship San Giusto, the Portuguese frigate Vasco da Gama, the Thai landing ship Surin, and the British destroyer Glasgow.

International Force East Timor began deploying to East Timor on 20 September 1999, under the authority of UN Security Council Resolution 1264. Led by Australia, who contributed 5,500 personnel and the force commander, Major General Peter Cosgrove, it was tasked with restoring peace and security, protecting and supporting UNAMET, and facilitating humanitarian assistance. Commander of the Thai Task Force Major General Sonkitti Jaggabattra was INTERFET's deputy commander. The Australian Deployable Joint Force Headquarters provided overall command and control. The main Australian combat element included infantry and cavalry provided by the 3rd Brigade. Due to the nature of the operation the force deployed without its artillery and other heavy weapons and equipment; however, 105 mm and 155 mm guns and Leopard tanks were available and on standby in Darwin for rapid deployment if required. It was supported by the 3rd Combat Engineer Regiment, 103rd Signals Squadron, 110th Signals Squadron, and elements of the 3rd Brigade Administrative Support Battalion. Twelve Black Hawk helicopters from the 5th Aviation Regiment were also deployed. Other force level troops included military police, an intelligence company, an electronic warfare squadron, elements of an artillery locating battery, and topographic survey personnel.

Special forces played a key role, with an Australian squadron from the Special Air Service Regiment (SASR), a troop from the New Zealand Special Air Service (NZSAS) and a troop from the British Special Boat Service (SBS) forming Response Force (RESPFOR). The SASR flew into Dili by RAAF C-130H Hercules securing Komoro Airport followed by NZSAS and SBS. With the airhead secured, infantry from the 2nd Battalion, Royal Australian Regiment (2 RAR) then flew in from Darwin supported by two M-113 armoured personnel carriers from B Squadron, 3rd/4th Cavalry Regiment. RESPFOR began vehicle patrols into Dili, including reconnaissance of Dili port, after which a rifle company from 2 RAR—borrowing Indonesian military trucks for transport—secured the port prior to the arrival of follow-on forces the next day, while the remainder of the battalion consolidated the position at Komoro. Meanwhile, an advance party of Gurkhas from the 2nd Battalion, The Royal Gurkha Rifles (2 RGR) and British Royal Marines Commandos from the Fleet Standby Rifle Troop (FSRT) secured the foothills and areas to the south of the city. 3rd Battalion, Royal Australian Regiment (3 RAR) began landing the next day at the port, along with the 2nd Cavalry Regiment equipped with ASLAV light armoured vehicles and the remainder of the Company Group from 2 RGR arrived. No. 2 Airfield Defence Squadron (2AFDS) arrived the following day to permanently secure Komoro airport replacing 2 RAR. Additional Australian forces and support personnel arrived in the days that followed as INTERFET continued to grow, as did forces from a number of other countries, in particular from New Zealand.

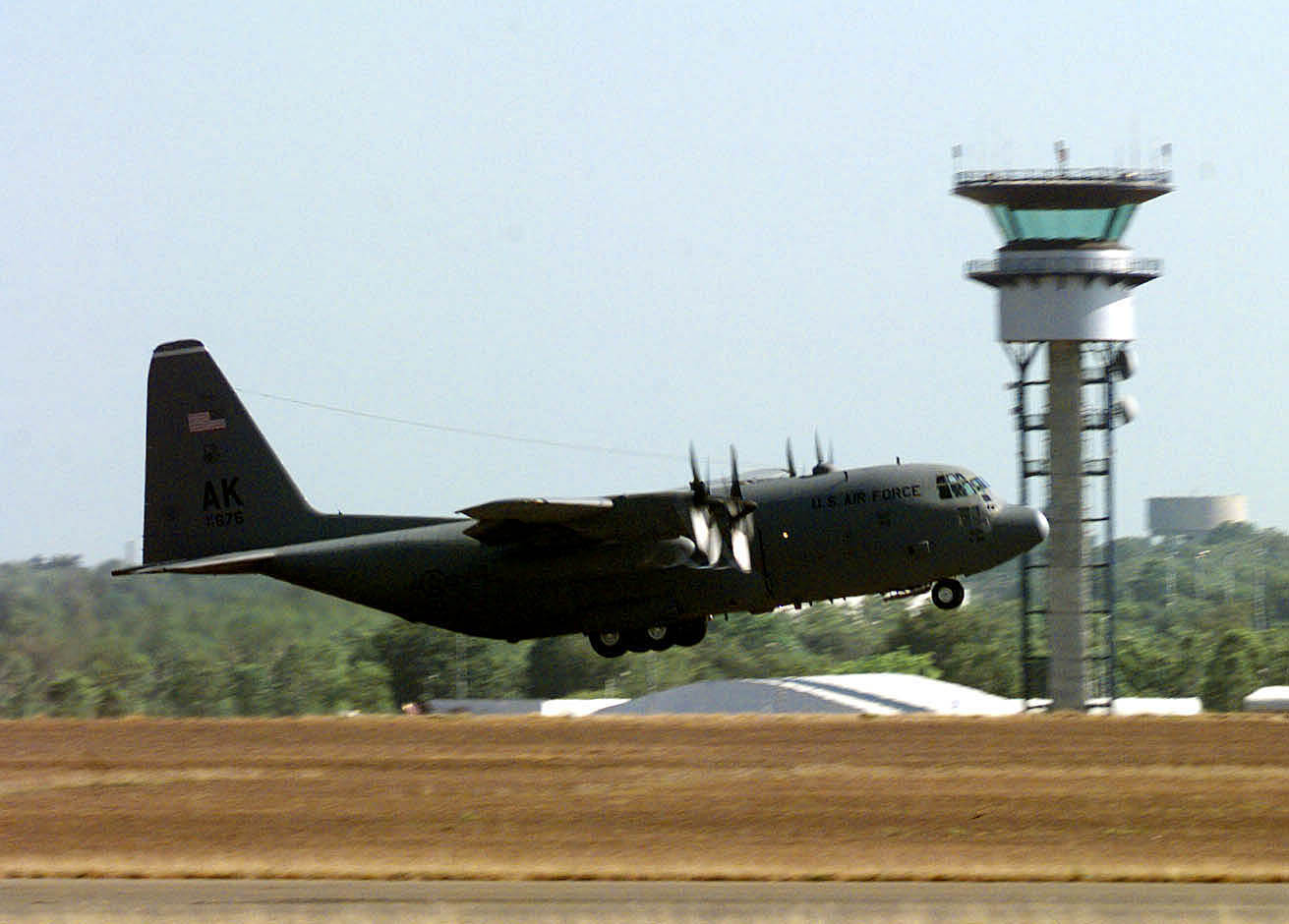
A U.S. Air Force C-130 taking off from Darwin for a mission to East Timor

Most United Nations Mission in East Timor (UNAMET) personnel had already been evacuated from the region in the preceding months by the Royal Australian Air Force, although a small number had remained behind. With the withdrawal of the Indonesian forces and officials, UNAMET re-established its headquarters in Dili on 28 September and on 19 October 1999, Indonesia formally recognised the result of the independence referendum. Soon after, the United Nations Transitional Administration in East Timor (UNTAET) was established as a peacekeeping operation which was also fully responsible for the administration of East Timor to oversee its transition to independence. With only limited forces available, Cosgrove adopted the 'oil spot' concept of dominating key areas from which the surrounding areas could be influenced and then secured, moving quickly by helicopter to keep the militia off balance. The large airfield at Baucau was secured by two platoons from 2 RAR on 22 September, who were relieved by the Philippine Army non-combat contingent known as the Philippine Humanitarian Support Mission to East Timor (PhilHSMET) three days later.

On 26 September D Company, 2 RAR conducted an air-mobile insertion into Liquica, approximately 30 kilometres (19 mi) returning to Dili about 30 hours later. On 29 September, the first New Zealand infantry arrived in Dili with V Company from the 1st Battalion, Royal New Zealand Infantry Regiment (1 RNZIR) together with four M-113 APCs from the Queen Alexandra's Mounted Rifles. With Dili secured INTERFET began moving into the western regencies. On 1 October 2 RAR flew in to simultaneously secure Balibo and Batugade, near the western border. Mounted in APCs, elements of the battalion then secured Maliana, before clearing the remainder of the Bobonaro Regency.

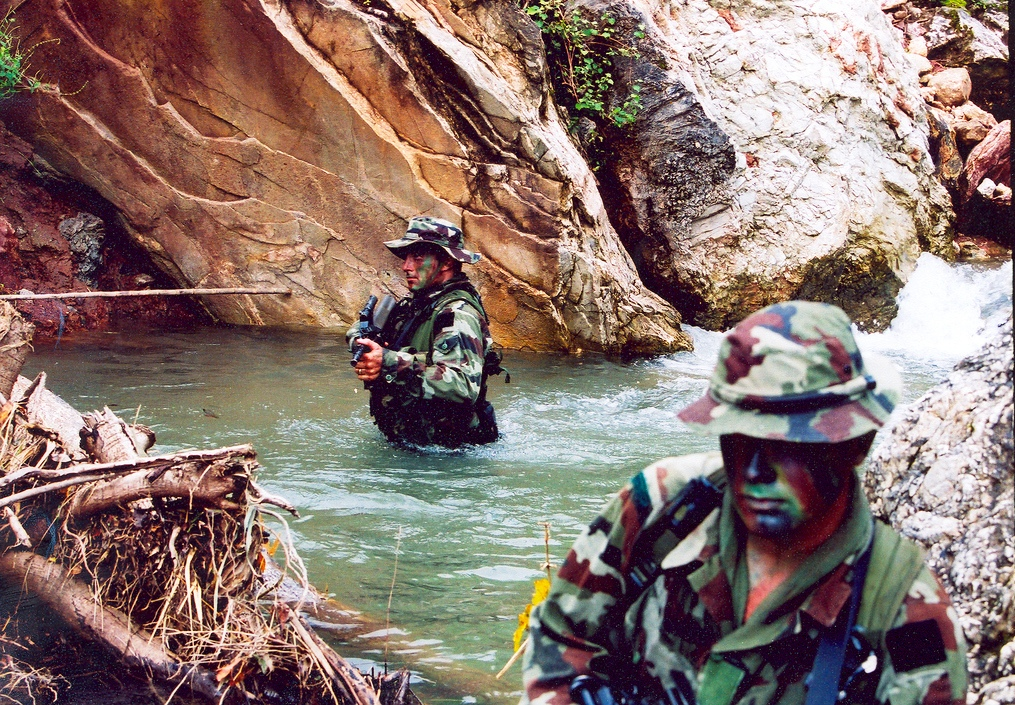
Irish Army Ranger Wing (ARW) on patrol in East Timor

On 6 October, an armoured column of Gurkhas and RESPFOR entered Suai together with RESPFOR in Black Hawks, capturing 116 militia; however, a number of SASR personnel were later ambushed, resulting in two Australians wounded. In the counter-attack two militia were killed, while two escaped but were later found to have died of wounds. Meanwhile, a third Australian battalion—the 5th/7th Battalion, Royal Australian Regiment (5/7 RAR)—had arrived in Dili relieving 3 RAR. On 10 October, 3 RAR was inserted into Bobonaro and Maliana by helicopter and V Company, 1 RNZIR was inserted in Suai also by Black Hawks relieving the Gurkhas/RESPFOR. The same day a platoon from 2 RAR was fired on by Indonesian police near Mota'ain on the border, and in the ensuing clash one Indonesian was killed.

On 13 October, a major amphibious operation was launched at Suai with the bulk of Headquarters 3rd Brigade (renamed Headquarters West Force) logistic and support units landed. West Force (WESTFOR) consisting of 2RAR, 3RAR, and 1RNZIR, in addition to supporting aviation, engineer and armoured units, was tasked with securing the border region. By 22 October, the 1 RNZIR Battalion Group was fully deployed which included a Canadian infantry company from 3rd Battalion, Royal 22 Regiment and a platoon of Irish special forces from the Army Ranger Wing supported by No. 3 Squadron RNZAF Iroquois helicopters. From mid-October contingents from a number of other countries began to arrive, including battalions from Thailand and South Korea, which were deployed in the eastern part of the country.

The arrival of thousands of international troops in East Timor caused the militia to flee across the border into Indonesia. A major contact at Aidabasalala, 15 kilometres (9.3 mi) from the West Timor border, occurred on 16 October 1999. The action, involving an Australian covert reconnaissance patrol from the SASR, saw the Australians repeatedly attacked in a series of firefights by a group of more than 20 militia. The SASR patrol had been detected whilst establishing an observation post and were forced to fight their way to a landing zone, being attacked a further three times over a one-and-a-half-hour period, killing a number of their attackers before they were successfully extracted by Black Hawk helicopter. Five militia were killed and three wounded, whilst there were no Australian casualties. Later, intelligence reports speculated on the involvement of Indonesian military personnel in the attempt to cut off and destroy the Australians, whilst conjecture as to the identity of the pro-Indonesian militias and the source of their arms and training increased in the media. (Note: Sporadic cross-border raids by the militia in 2000 following the hand-over to UNTAET led to further suspicion that the militia had the tacit support of elements of the Indonesian military, or that at the least their actions were being tolerated by them. Heightened activity occurred between July and September 2000, particularly in the southern border held by the New Zealand Army, which resulted in the death of one New Zealand soldier and one from Nepal, as well as the wounding of three others. Several militia were later killed in action in a series of ambushes initiated by the New Zealanders.)

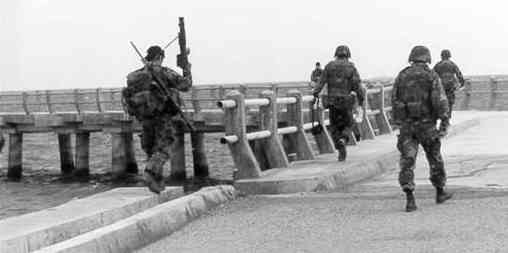
New Zealand Special Air Service (SAS) escorting a port survey team in East Timor

INTERFET then launched an operation to secure the last part of the country, the Oecussi Enclave. On 22 October 1999, the SASR conducted an air insertion in Black Hawk helicopters at Port Makasa in the enclave together with, an hour later, an amphibious landing from a Navy landing craft with their vehicles. The previous night, Australian Navy Clearance divers from HMAS Success had conducted a clandestine beach reconnaissance of the amphibious landing area. A day after the SASR landed, a platoon from 5/7 RAR with four APCs and a platoon of Gurkhas from 2 RGR were landed from the landing craft. Forty militia were captured while the remainder were believed to have fled to West Timor. In mid-November, 3 RAR took over responsibility for the Oecussi Enclave.

On 28 February 2000, INTERFET handed over command of military operations to United Nations Transitional Administration in East Timor (UNTAET). A New Zealand soldier, Private Leonard Manning, was shot dead during a contact on 24 July 2000, becoming the first combat fatality since the United Nations-backed forces had arrived in September. Manning was killed in the south-west town of Suai when his patrol was attacked by a group of militia. Grenades and claymore mines had been withdrawn from New Zealand's forces after the UN took over, a change which was rescinded after Manning's death. Two Australian soldiers also died in East Timor in 2000—Lance Corporal Russell Eisenhuth through illness on 17 January and Corporal Stuart Jones after a weapon accidentally discharged on 10 August 2000.

== Countries contributing to INTERFET ==
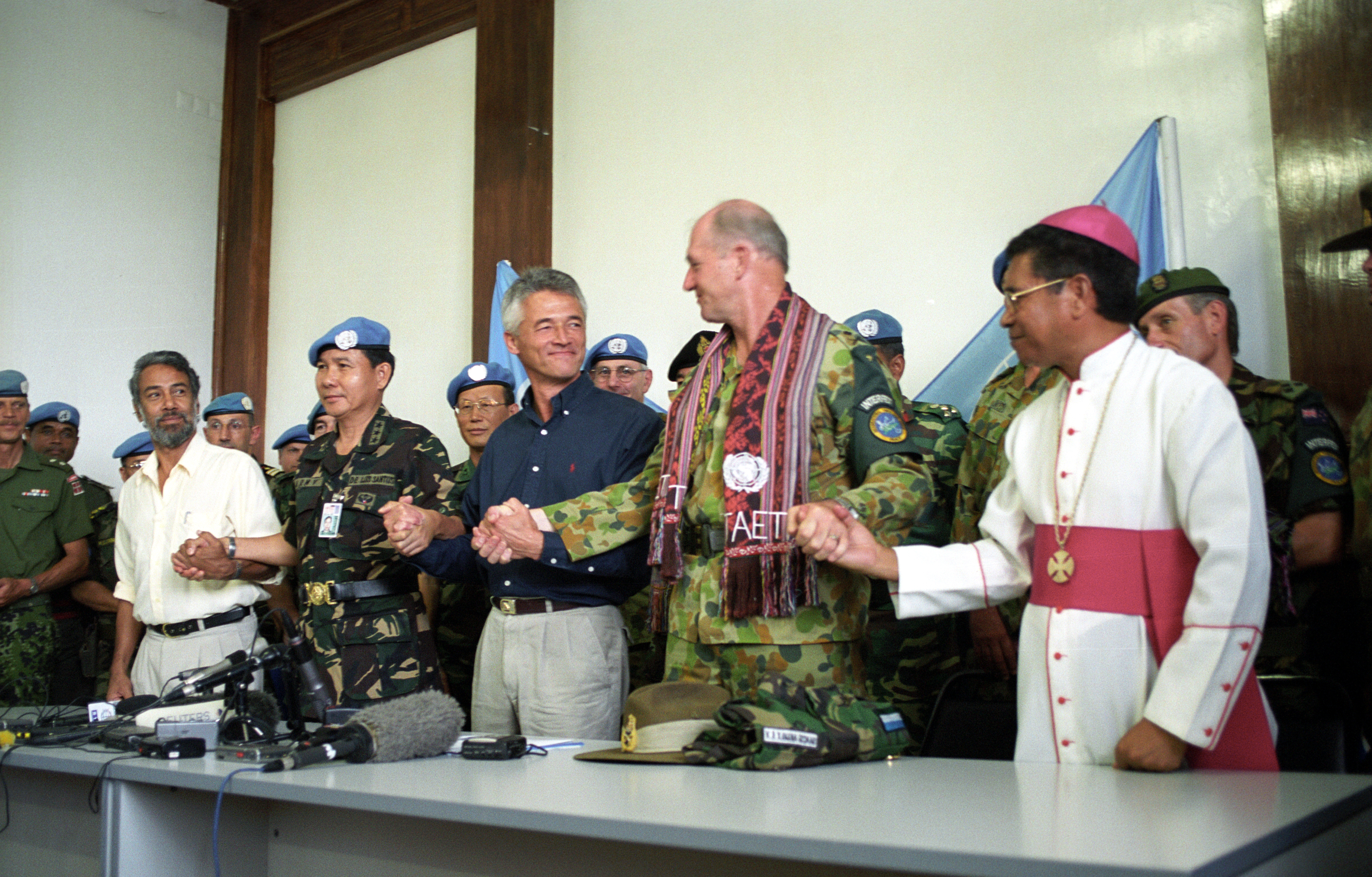
Commander INTERFET, Major General Cosgrove, joins hands with the new East Timor leadership during a celebration to mark the official handover to UNTAET.

Australia provided the largest contingent of troops, hardware and equipment for the INTERFET operation—5,500 personnel at its peak—followed by New Zealand. New Zealand's contribution peaked at 1,200 personnel. It was New Zealand's largest overseas military deployment since the Korean War. Eventually 22 nations contributed to INTERFET which grew to over 11,500 strong. Other countries to contribute include (in alphabetical order), Bangladesh, Brazil, Canada, Denmark, Egypt, Fiji, France, Germany, Ireland, Italy, Jordan, Kenya, Malaysia, Norway, Philippines, Portugal, Singapore, South Korea, Thailand, the United Kingdom, and the United States of America. Australia was refused US ground troops but was able to secure vital support for airlift, logistics, specialised intelligence, over the horizon deterrence, and "diplomatic muscle". Japan who was prevented by law from sending troops provided significant financial funding of a US$100 million. Participants were awarded the International Force East Timor Medal by the Australian Government.

As lead nation Australia provided logistic support for a number of other nations in addition to its own requirements. A Force Logistic Support Group was deployed during October and November based on the 10th Force Support Battalion (10 FSB), which included supply, transport, port operators, water transport and maintenance personnel, while a forward surgical team, preventative medical section, signals squadron, and engineers from the 17th Construction Squadron and a section of the 19th Chief Engineer Works were also attached. Meanwhile, the 9th Force Support Battalion was deployed to Darwin to provide additional support, and later rotated with 10 FSB in East Timor.

Despite the proximity of considerable civilian and military infrastructure in Darwin, the provision of this support proved a major challenge for Australia, which had not been required to provide full logistic support for a deployed force since the Second World War. Reductions in defence spending over the previous decade had led to the run-down of its logistic support force, resulting in the requirement to quickly implement a range of ad hoc measures to overcome these shortfalls. Despite relatively short lines of communication, low expenditure of ammunition, fuel and other consumables, and limited personnel and equipment casualties, the operation strained the ADF's limited logistic capability and it was questionable whether it could have sustained a more high intensity deployment.

== See also ==
- History of East Timor
- United Nations Mission of Support to East Timor (UNMISET)
- Answered by Fire, a 2006 television drama concerning the crisis which led to the INTERFET mission.
- Coalition of the willing
- Australian Involvement in the East Timor Invasion
- List of non-UN peacekeeping missions

== Notes ==
Footnotes

Citations
