= Battle of Aidabasalala =

1999 battle of the East Timorese crisis

Coordinates: 8°52′22″S 125°10′48″E

- Part of the 1999 East Timorese Crisis
- An Australian Army S-70 Blackhawk over East Timor
Date	16 October 1999
Location	Moto Meuculi Creek, near Aidabasalala, East Timor
Result	Australian victory

Belligerents
Australia	(Indonesia) Pro-Indonesian militias

Commanders and leaders
(Australia) Steven Oddy	Eurico Guterres

Units involved
(Australia) SASR	(Indonesia) Unknown

Strength
6 man patrol	~60 men

Casualties and losses
None	5 killed 4 wounded

The Battle of Aidabasalala (16 October 1999) was a small but hard-fought action during the 1999 East Timorese crisis between pro-Indonesian militia and a six-man Australian covert reconnaissance patrol from the Special Air Service Regiment (SASR) operating as part of the United Nations-mandated International Force for East Timor (INTERFET). The battle took place near Aidabasalala, 15 kilometres (9.3 mi) from the West Timor border, and saw the Australians attacking a group of more than sixty armed militia. The SASR patrol had been detected whilst establishing an observation post over a village and had to fight their way to a landing zone, being attacked a further three times over a one-and-a-half-hour period, killing a number of their opponents before they were safely evacuated by S-70 Black Hawk helicopter.

== Prelude ==
A six-man Australian covert reconnaissance patrol had been tasked to infiltrate to a village on foot after insertion from a Black Hawk helicopter to conduct a reconnaissance following intelligence reports that over 100 armed militia were in the area. They were to go into the border region and gather intelligence on the enemy’s numbers and movements. If the patrol confirmed the intelligence, a squadron-level assault would take place. The patrol was led by Sergeant Steven Oddy, and consisted of the patrol second-in-command who was a sergeant from the British Special Boat Service on a two-year exchange posting to the SASR, two scouts (one of whom was Lance Corporal Keith Fennell who later became a best-selling author), the patrol medic equipped with a Para Minimi light machine gun, and the signaller.

On 13 October 1999, the patrol was inserted 8 kilometres (5.0 mi) from the village near Aidabasalala via a Black Hawk helicopter. Over the next three days they moved south-west towards their objective, during which Oddy led his patrol across dried creek beds and through fog shrouded jungles. They operated under the cover of night and took defensive positions through the day. One evening they had a close call with a militia patrol coming in the opposite direction along the same trail. Though fortunately their night vision goggles allowed them to see the enemy before they were spotted, and the patrol stepped off the path, melting into the thick forest foliage and remained undetected. Even spending a whole day in a village without being spotted. Oddy recounted “As they moved past us, they were no more than centimetres from our chests. It was really frightening to be that close to the enemy and not know if we were about to be detected.”

== Battle ==
At 07:00 on the morning of 16 October 1999 the Australian reconnaissance patrol was moving forward when it came into contact with pro-Indonesian militia. The initial contact occurred as the Australians crossed the dry bed of the Moto Meuculi Creek and prepared to establish an observation post in the area which was believed to have been a major militia infiltration route from West Timor. The creek bed was about 10 metres (33 ft) wide with high banks of nearly 3 metres (9.8 ft) surrounded by scrub, long grass and lantana. As the Australians prepared their position a group of six militia in camouflage and webbing were observed moving stealthily along the creek bed. Rear scout Keith Fennell observed the militia from a distance of 20 metres (66 ft) noticing that three of the group appeared to have had military training. Fennell engaged the lead militia scout when he approached within 10m of his position before they made eye contact firing half of his magazine from his M4 Carbine. He hit the lead scout and fired on the rest of the scattering group. Oddy then joined Fennell, firing several 40 mm grenades from his M203 grenade launcher at the retreating militia. Movement was observed 50 metres (160 ft) away with Fennell, Oddy and the signaller who had moved up all firing their M4s and several 40mm grenades.

Oddy decided to send the scouts Fennell and the patrol medic/machine gunner to back over the creek bed in order to increase their field of vision with support provided by the three other patrol members on the bank. The scouts crossed over observing the deceased militia scout and began to traverse the bank. Within minutes the militia began probing the Australian position, with the patrol medic observing two militia moving up the creek bed 80 metres (260 ft) away, from the same direction as the previous group. He engaged the group, killing one of the attackers, and Fennell fired several grenades. The two scouts started to receive fire from all directions, as the sound of the intense action had attracted further militia to the fight. Oddy directed the scouts to re-cross to regroup, providing covering fire with Fennell crossing first followed by the medic crossing whilst firing.

The patrol moved to establish an all-round defensive position and attempted to establish communications to advise the patrol was in contact and required the assistance of the Dili-based Rapid Reaction Force (RRF). The militia could be heard moving through the dense vegetation. The signaller had an issue with communications. Observing them through the undergrowth, two militia were soon sighted with the patrol second-in-command opening fire on them just 7 metres (23 ft) away. Two were probably hit. Militia started to encircle the patrol firing blindly maybe seven to nine men sweeping and men to rear directing the assault. The medic fired into moving vegetation then Oddy. The second-in-command threw two grenades after rounds hit dirt within a foot from his position. Oddy decided to break contact, directing his men to leave their heavy packs. Fennell was directed to take up a position in the creek and the second scout together with the signaller cleared the packs each taking a radio to leave nothing behind. The two scouts crossed the creek followed by the rest of the patrol one at a time. Sporadic fire came from vegetation on the opposite bank after they all crossed.

After moving through 300 metres (980 ft) of vegetation Oddy ordered the patrol to set up a defensive perimeter so that the signaller could contact Dili again. Responding to the calls for assistance, the 12-man Rapid Response Force in two Black Hawks was dispatched to the position of the contact. The patrol waited 20 minutes before hearing the sound of the Black Hawks. The helicopters circled the battlefield in an attempt to support the forces on the ground, yet with the militia attack faltering they began to withdraw, presenting enticing yet forbidden targets for the door gunners. The patrol threw a smoke grenade to signal their location with the Black Hawks coming in fast to land. The patrol boarded a single Black Hawk to extract. A six-man RRF had inserted from this Black Hawk providing cover for the patrol to board the Black Hawk waiting until it was airborne before boarding the second Black Hawk joining the rest of the RRF. The helicopters circled back with the helicopter containing the patrol landing at the site of the contact, which had been observed to be clear of militia. Three members of the patrol were set down in a small clearing nearby, recovering the previously abandoned packs and a number of weapons from the dead bodies with the other Black Hawk hovering providing fire support.

== Aftermath ==
At least four militia were killed during the fighting, with another four believed to have been wounded. Local villagers nearby later reported that the attackers had suffered five killed and three wounded although this could not be confirmed. There were no Australian casualties. According to Horner the Australian patrol had demonstrated exceptional fire discipline and one member did not even fire his weapon at all as no militia had appeared in his arc of responsibility. In total they fired just 200 rounds from the machine-gunner's F-89 Minimi and only 67 rounds from their M4s during the action. Further RESPFOR teams were inserted into the area after the fighting, recovering the bodies of three of the dead militia. Meanwhile, a company from 2nd Battalion, Royal Australian Regiment (2 RAR) conducted a sweep of the area six hours after the contact, but they failed to locate any militia.

Later intelligence reported that the Indonesian military special forces unit Kopassus—who were alleged to be involved in co-ordinating the activities of the militia—after hearing the Black Hawk helicopter landing on the day of insertion, had formed the view a reconnaissance patrol had been inserted. There had been at least 60 armed militia with another 40 unarmed militia organised to search for the patrol. These were organised into three 20-man groups, divided into six man teams. Farrell states that intelligence from Falintil sources claimed that the militia involved had been part of a group that was trying to cross the border to Atambua in West Timor after previously being cut-off.

Oddy was subsequently awarded the Medal for Gallantry (MG) for his leadership during the fighting, presented by Queen Elizabeth in March of 2000. on his reaction over receiving the medal he said “I don’t think what I did was as brave as some. If you receive any medal, you know you didn’t receive it because of your individual actions. If it hadn’t been for the five other blokes on the patrol, there is no way I would have received any award.”
