= João da Costa Tavares =

Indonesian and East Timorese militia leader

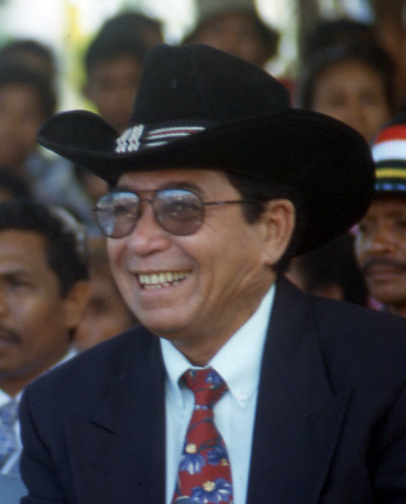
- Tavares in 1999

1st Regent of Bobonaro
- In office 1976–1989
- President: Suharto
- Governor: Arnaldo dos Reis Araújo; Guilherme Maria Gonçalves; Mário Viegas Carrascalão
- Preceded by: Office established
- Succeeded by: Mariano Lopes da Cruz

Personal details
- Born: 6 April 1931 Atabae, Portuguese Timor
- Died: 8 June 2009 (aged 78) Atambua, East Nusa Tenggara, Indonesia
- Party: UDT
- Children: Jose Antonio; Arnaldo da Silva Tavares

João da Costa Tavares (6 April 1931 – 8 June 2009) was the Commander-in-Chief of the pro-Indonesian Militia in East Timor. He was also a pro-integration militiamen.

== Biography ==
Tavares came from a wealthy family. During the Portuguese colonial period, Tavares was a member of the Portuguese colonial army.

He was part of the conservative Timorese Democratic Union (UDT). When the UDT was defeated by the left wing Fretilin in the East Timorese civil war in 1975, Tavares fled to Atambua, West Timor, part of Indonesian Nusa Tenggara Timur. With Indonesia's annexation of East Timor, he returned and supported the Indonesians in the fight against the FRETILIN.

From May 1976 to 1989, Tavares was regent (Bupati) of the Bobonaro District, There he commanded the Halilintar militia, which was inactive between 1980 and 1995 but was then reactivated during the 1999 East Timorese crisis. During that time he became a wealthy landowner. After his tenure as Bupati, Tavares became a member of the Regional People's Representative Council of Timor Timur Province, the legislature of annexed East Timor in Indonesia. He was also the supreme commander of the "Pasukan Pro-Integrasi" Militias (PPI) an umbrella movement of all pro-integration militias, from April 17, 1999. His deputy was Eurico Guterres, commander of the Aitarak militia. During a demonstration of pro-integration militias after the appointment of Tavares, they, together with Indonesian security forces, committed the massacre in the house of Manuel Carrascalão, in which at least 19 people died. During the 1999 wave of violence, more killings took place, which are credited to Halilintar and the PPI. Tavares himself threatened war and the assassination of independence activists if the East Timorese voted for independence in the August 30, 1999 referendum. He is also one of the leaders in the Liquiçá church massacre.

When the East Timorese voted for independence in the 1999 independence referendum and Indonesia withdrew from East Timor, Tavares left the country and moved to Atambua. There he worked as a consultant for the Union of Timor Aswain (UNTAS), a political organization of the former pro-Indonesian militias in East Timor. In the early days, Tavares supported open armed incursions into East Timor through the 59,500 militiamen under his command. Tavares also did not deny that his militias were involved in the demolitions of Operation Donner. However, he denied contacts with the armed forces of Indonesia (TNI). In October 2000, four militia leaders wanted to return to East Timor. Tavares threatened them with extrajudicial consequences.

In July 2003, Tavares was tried in absentia in Dili for crimes against humanity and his active leadership of the Bobonaro militias, leading to multiple offenses culminating in the massacre at the Maliana police station on September 8, 1999. Several Halilintar militia officers were sentenced to long prison terms by the Dili District Court's Special Panel for Serious Crimes.

Tavares died of complications from a stroke in Atambua in 2009 at the age of 78. He was buried at Seroja Heroes Cemetery, Atambua, Belu Regency.
