= José Abílio Osório Soares =

Indonesian politician

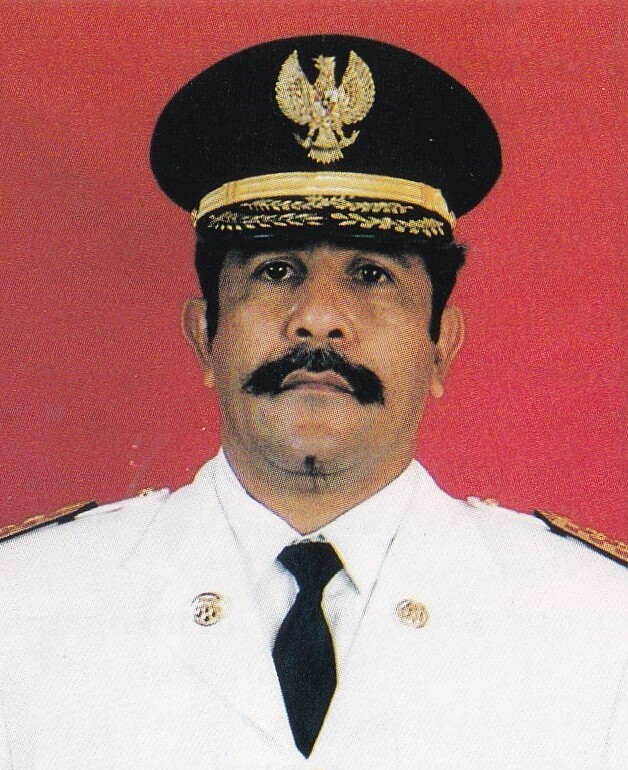
- Official portrait c. 1992

Governor of East Timor
- In office 18 September 1992 – 19 October 1999
- President: Soeharto; B. J. Habibie
- Preceded by: Mário Viegas Carrascalão
- Succeeded by: Sérgio Vieira de Mello (as Special Representative of the Secretary-General for East Timor)

Personal details
- Born: José Abílio Osório Soares; 2 June 1947 Vila Nova Ourique, Portuguese Timor
- Died: 17 June 2007 (aged 60) Kupang, East Nusa Tenggara, Indonesia
- Party: Golkar
- Spouse: Maria Ângela Correia de Lemos Osório Soares

José Abílio Osório Soares (Portuguese pronunciation: [ʒuˈzɛ ɐˈβiliu ɔˈzɔɾiu suˈaɾiʃ]; 2 June 1947 – 17 June 2007) was an Indonesian politician of East Timorese descent. He was the last governor of the Indonesian province of East Timor before the country's independence.

== Personal life ==
During the Indonesian occupation of East Timor in 1975 to 1999, Soares became Mayor of Dili, later Regent (Bupati) of his hometown of Manatuto and from 18 September 1992 until 1999, the last governor of the province of Timor Timur. Immediately after taking office, he outraged the world with his statement that "many more should have died" in the Santa Cruz massacre that had taken place shortly before. In May 1994, he proposed an autonomy within Indonesia to resolve the East Timor conflict, which was rejected by the Indonesian President Suharto as unconstitutional. Soares was then sent to Jakarta for four months on a military course, which was to be considered a disciplinary measure. During Soares second term in office from September 1997, his involvement in corruption cases in connection with the family-owned company Anak Liambau Group became so massive, that the Deputy Governor Suryo Prabowo resigned in protest in 1998. After Suharto's resignation in May 1998, there were heavy demonstrations in East Timor over allegations of corruption against Soares. At the same time, public pressure increased, calling for an East Timor independence referendum in 1999.

Soares played a key role in building up the Pro-Indonesia militia that swept across the country after the East Timor independence referendum of 30 August and the subsequent destruction of East Timor. He has also been held directly responsible for some cases, such as the Liquiçá Church massacre of 6 April 1999, massacre in the house of independence leader Manuel Carrascalão of 17 April 1999, in the residence of Bishop Belo on 6 September 1999, and in a Church in Suai on 6 September 1999. In connection with these cases, he was accused of having done nothing to prevent these crimes. With the intervention of INTERFET and takeover by the United Nations (UNTAET), which later led East Timor to independence, Soares was deposed.

== Death ==
Soares died in Kupang, East Nusa Tenggara, of cancer on 17 June 2007 after being in a coma for four days. Despite East Timorese objections he was given a state hero's funeral by the Indonesian government. Frans Lebu Raya, the deputy governor of East Nusa Tenggara province laid a wreath sent by Indonesian President Susilo Bambang Yudhoyono, who did not personally attend the funeral. Other important dignitaries who attended the funeral included several highly controversial figures from the Indonesian occupation of East Timor, including retired Lt. Gen. and future Indonesian President Prabowo Subianto, retired Indonesian Major General Zacky Anwar Makarim, former deputy army chief of staff Kiki Syanakri, and West Papua Governor Abraham Octavianus Atururi.

Soares, who was 60 when he died, is survived by his wife, Maria Ângela Correia de Lemos Osório Soares and their four children, as well as his 86-year-old mother, Beatriz Osório Soares. All of his family members attended the funeral. He was later laid to rest at the Dharma Loka Heroes Cemetery in Kupang.
