= Scorched Earth Operation =

1999 Indonesian military operation in East Timor

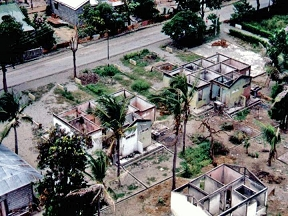
A neighborhood in Dili in October 1999

The Scorched Earth Operation (Indonesian: Operasi Bumi Hangus) refers to actions of pro-Indonesia paramilitary groups during the events of September 1999 in Dili, the capital of East Timor (now Timor-Leste). The country had been under Indonesian occupation since 1975, and resistance by Timorese peaked in 1999. Following a referendum on Timorese independence, pro-Indonesian militia and military rampaged through East Timor, inflicting violence on civilians and destroying vital infrastructure.

== Warnings ==
As pro-Indonesian militia leaders warned of a "bloodbath" if the referendum was successful, Indonesian "roving ambassador" Francisco Lopes da Cruz declared: "If people reject autonomy, there is the possibility blood will flow in East Timor." One paramilitary leader announced that a "sea of fire" would result in the event of an independence vote. As the date of the vote drew near, reports of anti-independence violence continued to circulate.

The day of the vote, 30 August 1999, was generally calm and orderly. 98.6% of registered voters cast ballots, and on 4 September, UN Secretary-General Kofi Annan announced that 78.5% of the votes had been cast for independence. Brought up on the New Order's insistence that the East Timorese supported integration, Indonesians were either shocked or disbelieved that the East Timorese had voted against being part of Indonesia.

== Reprisals ==
Within hours paramilitary groups had begun attacking people and setting fires around the capital Dili. Foreign journalists and election observers fled, and tens of thousands of East Timorese took to the mountains. Islamic gangs attacked Dili's Catholic Diocese building, killing two dozen people; the next day, the headquarters of the ICRC was attacked and burned to the ground. Almost one hundred people were killed later in Suai, and reports of similar massacres poured in from around East Timor. The UN withdrew most of its personnel, but the Dili compound had been flooded with refugees.

Four UN workers refused to evacuate unless the refugees were also rescued, insisting they would rather die at the hands of the paramilitary groups. At the same time, Indonesian troops and paramilitary gangs forced over 200,000 people into West Timor, into camps described by Human Rights Watch as "deplorable conditions".

== "Fantasies" and "lies" ==
When a UN delegation arrived in Jakarta on 8 September, they were told by Indonesian President Habibie that reports of bloodshed in East Timor were "fantasies" and "lies". General Wiranto of the Indonesian military insisted that his soldiers had the situation under control, and later expressed his sentiments and passion for East Timor by singing the 1975 hit song "Feelings" at an event for military wives.

== Attacks on education ==
The education system was a major target for destruction. The first buildings to be razed were resistance centers, including the CNRT offices and student centers. Then the schools, colleges, and the university were destroyed. 95% of school buildings in East Timor were destroyed. The Universitas Timor Timur and Dili Polytechnic buildings in Dili and in Hera, respectively, as well as the nursing school, were looted, smashed, and burnt with little surviving the onslaught.

University students fanned across the country before the referendum in 1999 to work for the independence vote and many were killed in the violence that followed. After the destruction, students again went to regional areas to teach classes in burnt-out buildings to keep the children learning, and the schools open. They also organized classes for tertiary students when no other education facilities were operational.
