= 1999 East Timorese crisis =

Pro-Indonesian attacks in East Timor after an independence referendum

- Part of the decolonisation of Asia and the fall of Suharto
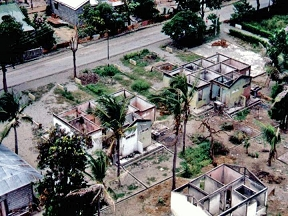
- Destroyed houses in Dili
Date	April 1999 – 2002 (3 years)
Location	East Timor
Result	East Timorese victory: Defeat of pro-Indonesian militia; Stabilisation of East Timor; East Timorese independence referendum; US embargo of military sales to Indonesia from 9 September 1999 to 22 November 2005; UK embargo of military sales to Indonesia from 11 September 1999 to 11 April 2012; Australia embargo of military sales to Indonesia September 1999-2006; European Union (EU) embargo of military sales to Indonesia 16 September 1999 – 17 January 2000; 80% of East Timor's infrastructure destroyed by Scorched Earth Operation

Belligerents
East Timor; INTERFET; UNTAET Full list: Australia – 5,000; New Zealand – 1,250; Thailand – 1,600; Argentina; Austria; Bangladesh; Benin; Bolivia; Bosnia and Herzegovina; Brazil; Bulgaria; Canada; Chile; China; Croatia; Denmark; Egypt; Fiji; France; Gambia; Germany; Ghana; Israel; Ireland; Italy; Japan; Jordan; Kenya; Malaysia; Mexico; Mozambique; Namibia; Nepal; Niger; Nigeria; Norway; Pakistan; Peru; Philippines; Portugal; Puerto Rico; Russia; Samoa; Senegal; Serbia and Montenegro; Singapore; Slovakia; Slovenia; Spain; South Korea; Sri Lanka; Sweden; Tajikistan; Turkey; Ukraine; Uruguay; United Kingdom; United States; Vanuatu; Zambia; Zimbabwe	Pro-Indonesia militias: Aitarak; Besi Merah Putih; Laksaur; Mahidi; Kopassus; BIN; BAIS

Commanders and leaders
(Australia) John Howard; (Australia) Peter Cosgrove; (New Zealand) Jenny Shipley; (New Zealand) Helen Clark; (New Zealand) Carey Adamson; (Brazil) Sérgio Vieira de Mello; (Portugal) Paulo Pereira Guerreiro #; (Italy) Giorgio Cornacchione	Wiranto; Eurico Guterres

Strength
11,000 military and police	13,000 militias

Casualties and losses
(Timor-Leste) East Timor – 16 killed (UN local staff); Australia – 2 killed by accident; New Zealand – 5 killed (4 by accident); Thailand – 2 killed; Tajikistan – 1 killed; Bangladesh – 1 killed and 1 wounded by IED; Croatia – 1 killed (UNHCR staff); Ethiopia – 1 killed (UNHCR staff); Fiji – 3 killed and 11 wounded; Brazil – 1 killed; Germany – 1 killed; Ghana – 1 killed by disease; Indonesia – 2 killed (UN local staff); (Republic of Ireland) Ireland – 2 killed; Malaysia – 3 killed; Nepal – 1 killed and 3 wounded; Philippines – 4 killed and 4 wounded; Portugal – 4 killed and 9 wounded; Puerto Rico – 1 killed (UNHCR staff); Russia – 5 killed and 1 missing by accident; South Korea – 4 killed and 1 missing by accident; Spain – 1 killed; United States – 1 wounded; Total: 65 killed; 49 UN staff and NGOs captured later released	15–19 killed; 301+ captured
- 1,400 civilians killed 220,000+ refugees 2 journalists killed 1 Indonesian soldier killed 1 Indonesian police officer killed

The 1999 East Timorese crisis began with attacks by pro-Indonesia militia groups on civilians and expanded to general violence throughout the country, centred in the capital Dili. The violence intensified after a majority of eligible East Timorese voters voted for independence from Indonesia. A Scorched Earth Operation by militia groups destroyed 80% of Dili's infrastructure. At least 1,400 civilians are believed to have been murdered both before and after voting. A UN-authorized force (INTERFET) consisting mainly of Australian Defence Force personnel was deployed to East Timor to establish and maintain peace.

== Background ==
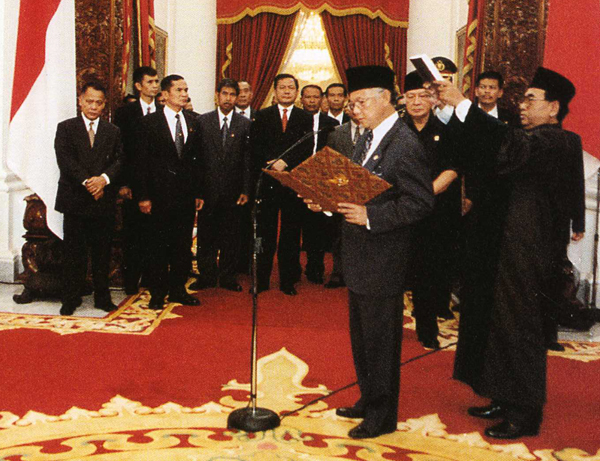
Indonesian President B. J. Habibie takes the presidential oath of office on 21 May 1998.

Independence for East Timor, or even limited regional autonomy, was not allowable under Suharto's New Order. Notwithstanding Indonesian public opinion in the 1990s occasionally showing begrudging appreciation of the Timorese position, it was widely feared that an independent East Timor would destabilise Indonesian unity. Renewed United Nations-brokered mediation efforts between Indonesia and Portugal began in early 1997. The 1997 Asian financial crisis, however, caused tremendous upheaval in Indonesia and led to Suharto's resignation in May 1998, ending his thirty-year presidency. Prabowo, by then in command of the powerful Indonesian Strategic Reserve, went into exile in Jordan and military operations in East Timor were costing the bankrupt Indonesian government a million dollars a day. The subsequent "reformasi" period of relative political openness and transition, included unprecedented debate about Indonesia's relationship with East Timor. For the remainder of 1998, discussion forums took place throughout Dili working towards a referendum. Indonesian Foreign Minister Alatas described plans for phased autonomy leading to possible independence as "all pain, no gain" for Indonesia. On 8 June 1998, three weeks after taking office, Habibie, as Suharto's successor, announced that Indonesia would soon offer East Timor a special plan for autonomy.

In late 1998, the Australian Government of John Howard drafted a letter to Indonesia advising of a change in Australian policy, and advocating a referendum on independence within a decade. President Habibie saw such an arrangement as implying "colonial rule" by Indonesia and he decided to call a snap referendum on the issue.

Indonesia and Portugal announced on 5 May 1999 that a vote would be held allowing the people of East Timor to choose between the autonomy plan or independence. The vote, to be administered by the United Nations Mission in East Timor (UNAMET), was originally scheduled for 8 August but later postponed until 30 August. Indonesia also took responsibility for security; this arrangement caused worry in East Timor, but many observers believe that Indonesia would have refused to allow foreign peacekeepers during the vote.

== Voting and violence ==
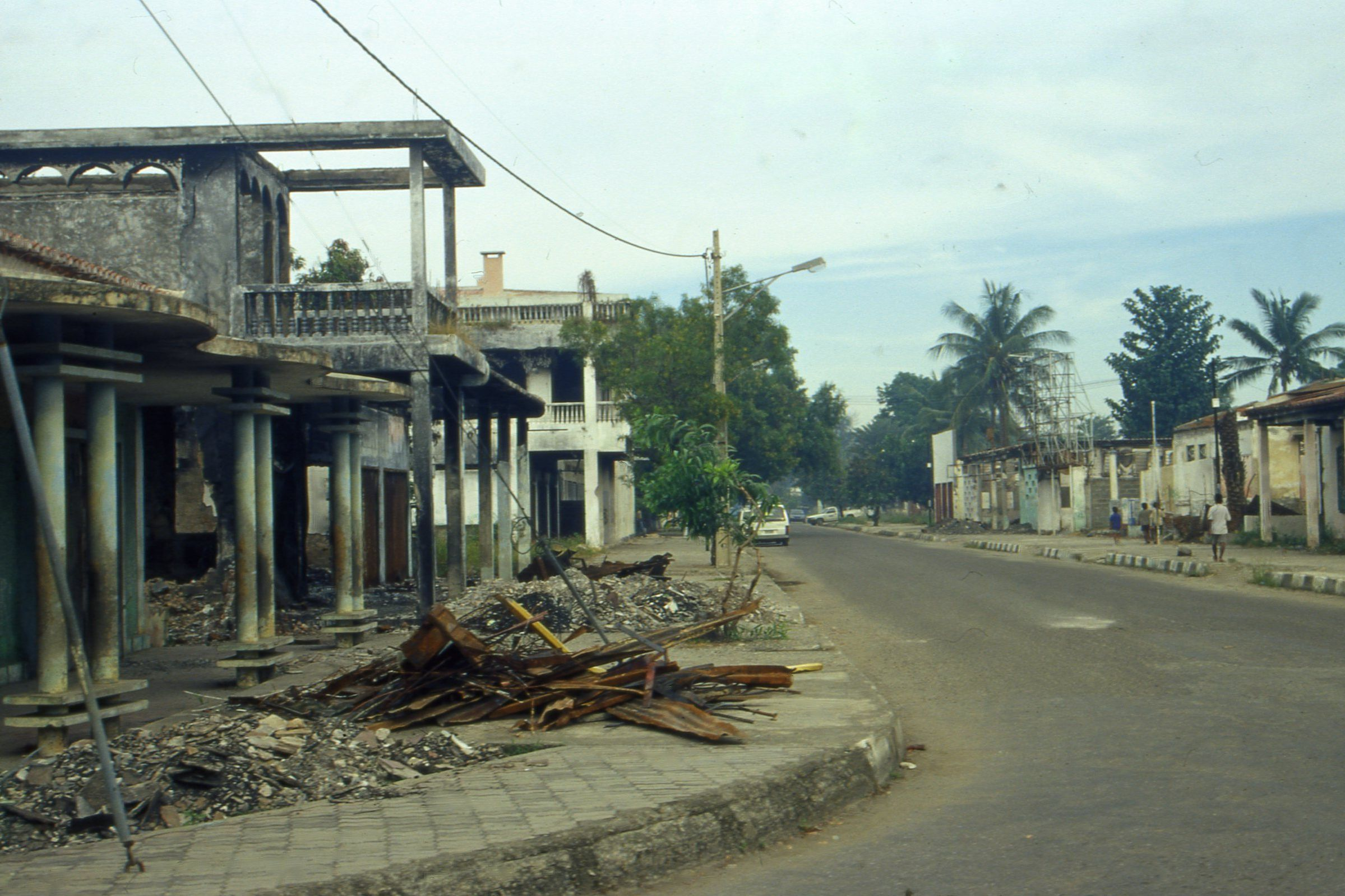
Destruction in Dili

As groups supporting autonomy and independence began campaigning, a series of pro-integration paramilitary groups of East Timorese began threatening and committing violence around the country. Alleging pro-independence bias on the part of UNAMET, the groups were seen working with and receiving training from Indonesian soldiers. Before the May agreement was announced, an April paramilitary attack in Liquiça left dozens of East Timorese dead. On 16 May 1999, a gang accompanied by Indonesian troops attacked suspected independence activists in the village of Atara; in June another group attacked a UNAMET office in Maliana. Indonesian authorities claimed to be helpless to stop what it claimed was violence between rival East Timorese factions, but Ramos-Horta joined many others in scoffing at such notions. In February 1999 he said: "Before [Indonesia] withdraws it wants to wreak major havoc and destabilization, as it has always promised. We have consistently heard that over the years from the Indonesian military in Timor."

As militia leaders warned of a "bloodbath", Indonesian "roving ambassador" Francisco Lopes da Cruz declared: "If people reject autonomy there is the possibility blood will flow in East Timor." One paramilitary leader announced that a "sea of fire" would result in the event of a vote for independence. As the date of the vote drew near, reports of anti-independence violence continued to accumulate.

The day of the vote, 30 August 1999, was generally calm and orderly. 98.6 per cent of registered voters cast ballots, and on 4 September UN Secretary-General Kofi Annan announced that 78.5 per cent of the votes had been cast for independence. Brought up on the "New Order"'s insistence that the East Timorese supported integration, Indonesians were either shocked or incredulous that the East Timorese had voted against being part of Indonesia. Many accepted media stories blaming the supervising United Nations and Australia who had pressured Habibie for a resolution.

As UNAMET staff returned to Dili following the ballot, towns began to be systematically razed. Within hours of the results, paramilitary groups had begun attacking people and setting fires around the capital Dili. Foreign journalists and election observers fled, and tens of thousands of East Timorese took to the mountains. Indonesian Muslim gangs attacked Dili's Catholic Diocese building, killing two dozen people; the next day, the headquarters of the ICRC was attacked and burned to the ground. Almost one hundred people were killed later in Suai, and reports of similar massacres poured in from around East Timor. The vast majority of the UN staff locked down in their Dili compound, which had been flooded with refugees, refused to evacuate unless the refugees were withdrawn as well, insisting they would rather die at the hands of the paramilitary groups. At the same time, Indonesian troops and paramilitary gangs forced over 200,000 people into West Timor, into camps described by Human Rights Watch as "deplorable conditions". After several weeks the Australian Government offered to allow the refugees in the UN compound along with the UN staff to be evacuated to Darwin, and all the refugees and all except four UN staff were evacuated.

When a UN delegation arrived in Jakarta on 8 September, they were told by Habibie that reports of bloodshed in East Timor were "fantasies" and "lies". General Wiranto of the Indonesian military insisted that his soldiers had the situation under control, and later expressed his emotion for East Timor by singing the 1975 hit song "Feelings" at an event for military wives.

== Countries contributing to INTERFET & UNTAET ==
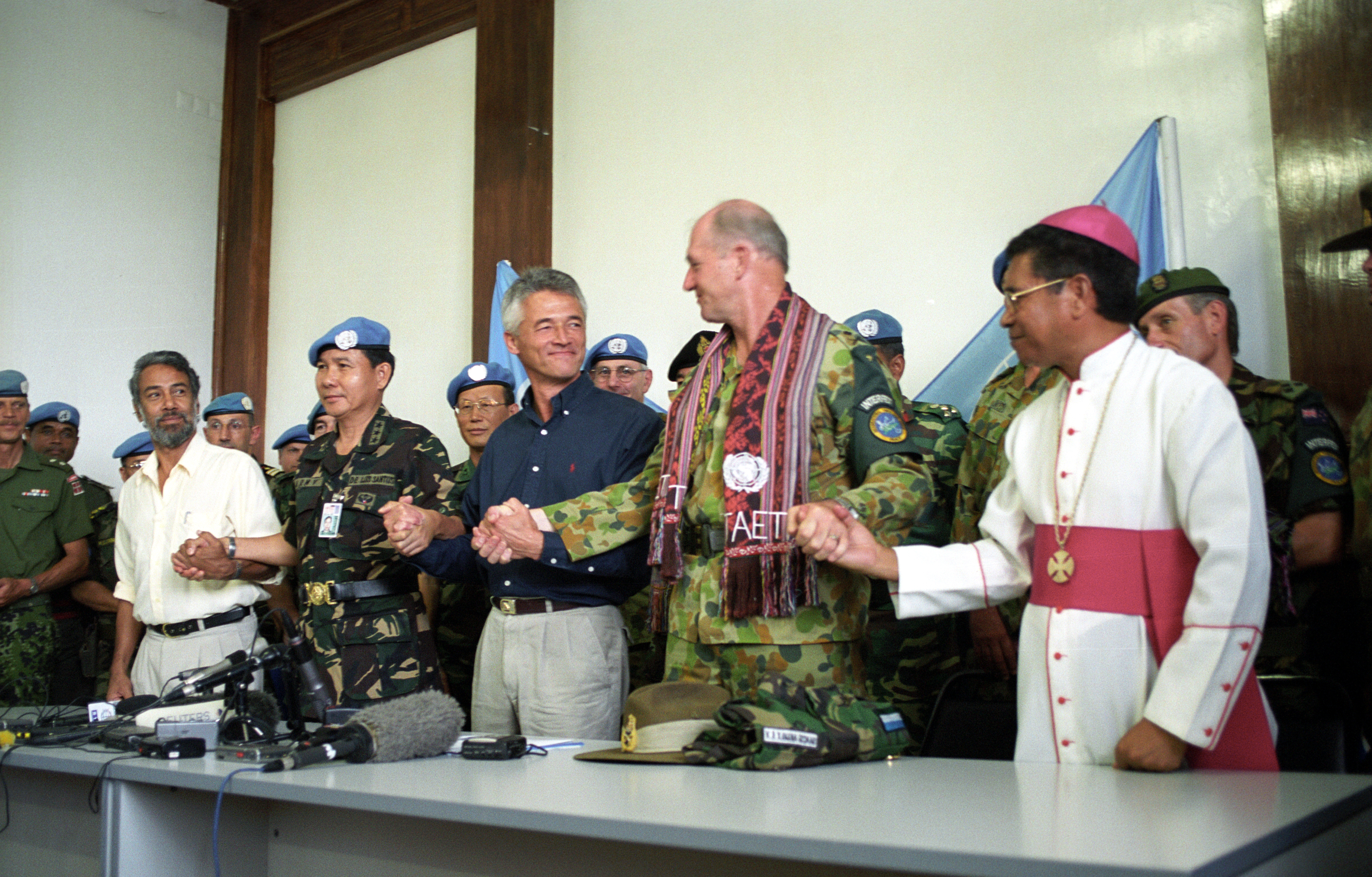
Commander INTERFET, Major General Cosgrove, joins hands with the new East Timor leadership during a celebration to mark the official handover to UNTAET.

Australia provided the largest contingent of troops, hardware and equipment for the INTERFET operation—5,500 personnel at its peak—followed by New Zealand. New Zealand's contribution peaked at 1,200 personnel. It was New Zealand's largest overseas military deployment since the Korean War. Eventually, 22 nations contributed to INTERFET, which grew to over 11,500 strong. Another 40 nations joined UNTAET as either contributing military personnel or civilian police officers. Countries known to contribute include (in alphabetical order) Australia, Austria, Argentina, Bangladesh, Benin, Bolivia, Bosnia and Herzegovina, Brazil, Bulgaria, Canada, Chile, China, Croatia, Denmark, Egypt, Fiji, France, Gambia, Germany, Ghana, Ireland, Italy, Japan, Jordan, Kenya, Malaysia, Mexico, Mozambique, Namibia, Nepal, New Zealand, Niger, Nigeria, Norway, New Zealand, Pakistan, Peru, Philippines, Portugal, Russia, Samoa, Senegal, Serbia and Montenegro, Singapore, Slovakia, Slovenia, South Korea, Spain, Sri Lanka, Sweden, Tajikistan, Thailand, Turkey, Ukraine, the United Kingdom, and the United States of America. Australia was refused US ground troops but was able to secure vital support for airlift, logistics, specialised intelligence, over the horizon deterrence, and "diplomatic muscle". Japan who was prevented by law from sending troops provided significant financial funding of a US$100 million. Participants were awarded the International Force East Timor Medal by the Australian Government.

As lead nation Australia provided logistic support for a number of other nations in addition to its own requirements. A Force Logistic Support Group was deployed during October and November based on the 10th Force Support Battalion (10 FSB), which included supply, transport, port operators, water transport and maintenance personnel, while a forward surgical team, preventative medical section, signals squadron, and engineers from the 17th Construction Squadron and a section of the 19th Chief Engineer Works were also attached. Meanwhile, the 9th Force Support Battalion was deployed to Darwin to provide additional support, and later rotated with 10 FSB in East Timor.

Despite the proximity of considerable civilian and military infrastructure in Darwin, the provision of this support proved a major challenge for Australia, which had not been required to provide full logistic support for a deployed force since the Second World War. Reductions in defence spending over the previous decade had led to the run-down of its logistic support force, resulting in the requirement to quickly implement a range of ad hoc measures to overcome these shortfalls. Despite relatively short lines of communication, low expenditure of ammunition, fuel and other consumables, and limited personnel and equipment casualties, the operation strained the ADF's limited logistic capability and it was questionable whether it could have sustained a more high intensity deployment.

== Indonesian withdrawal and peacekeeping force ==
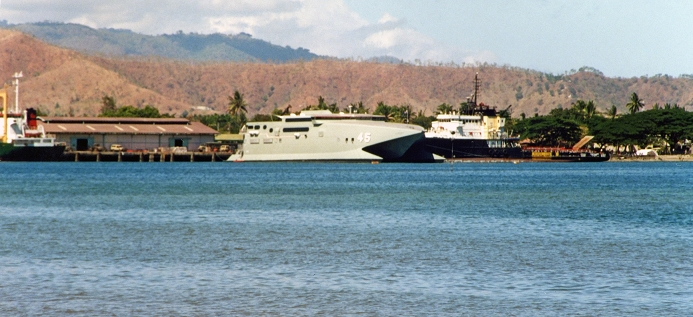
HMAS Jervis Bay in Dili in October 1999.

The violence was met with widespread public anger in Australia, Portugal and elsewhere and activists in Portugal, Australia, the United States and other nations pressured their governments to take action. Australian Prime Minister John Howard consulted United Nations Secretary General Kofi Annan and lobbied U.S. President Bill Clinton to support an Australian-led international peacekeeping force to enter East Timor to end the violence. The United States offered crucial logistical and intelligence resources and an "over-horizon" deterrent presence, but did not commit forces to the operation. Finally, on 11 September, Bill Clinton announced:

I have made clear that my willingness to support future economic assistance from the international community will depend upon how Indonesia handles the situation from today.

Indonesia, in dire economic straits, relented. Habibie announced on 12 September that Indonesia would withdraw its soldiers and allow an Australian-led international peacekeeping force to enter East Timor. The Indonesian garrison in the east of the island was Battalion 745, the bulk of which was withdrawn by sea, but one company, taking the battalion's vehicles and heavy equipment, withdrew westwards along the northern coastal road, towards Dili and the Indonesian border, leaving death and destruction as they went. They murdered dozens of innocent and unarmed villagers along the way and, near Dili, killed one journalist and attempted to kill two more.

On 15 September 1999, the United Nations Security Council expressed concern at the deteriorating situation in East Timor, and issued UNSC Resolution 1264 calling for a multinational force to restore peace and security to East Timor, to protect and support the United Nations mission there, and to facilitate humanitarian assistance operations until such time as a United Nations peacekeeping force could be approved and deployed in the area.

INTERFET then launched an operation to secure the last part of the country the Oecussi Enclave. On 22 October 1999, the SASR conducted an air insertion in Black Hawk helicopters at Port Makasa in the enclave together with an hour later an amphibious landing from a Navy landing craft with their vehicles. The night before Australian Navy Clearance divers from HMAS Success had conducted a clandestine beach reconnaissance of the amphibious landing area.

The International Force for East Timor, or INTERFET, under the command of Australian Major General Peter Cosgrove, entered Dili on 20 September and by 31 October the last Indonesian troops had left East Timor. The arrival of thousands of international troops in East Timor caused the militia to flee across the border into Indonesia, whence sporadic cross-border raids by the militia against INTERFET forces were conducted.

The United Nations Transitional Administration in East Timor (UNTAET) was established at the end of October and administered the region for two years. Control of the nation was turned over to the Government of East Timor and independence was declared on 20 May 2002. On 27 September of the same year, East Timor joined the United Nations as its 191st member state.

The bulk of the military forces of INTERFET were Australian. There were more than 5,500 Australian troops at its peak, including an infantry brigade, with armoured and aviation support. Eventually 22 nations further contributed to the force which at its height had over 11,000 troops. The United States provided crucial logistic and diplomatic support throughout the crisis, while the cruiser USS Mobile Bay operated in open ocean at arm's length, whilst Australian, Canadian and British ships entered Dili. A US Marine infantry battalion of 1,000 men—plus organic armour and artillery—was also stationed off the coast aboard the USS Belleau Wood to provide a strategic reserve in the event of significant armed opposition.

== Casualties ==
An estimated 1,400 civilians were killed both before and after the independence referendum. Between 17 and 24 UNTAET personnel died during the mission. Approximately 15 to 19 pro-Indonesian East Timorese militia members were killed in clashes with international forces. At least 15 UNAMET staff members were also killed during the crisis. Two East Timorese journalists affiliated with Suara Timor Timur and Radio UNAMET, were killed by militias amid the unrest.

=== UNTAET casualties in East Timor ===
- Timor-Leste – 6 dead
- New Zealand – 3 dead
- Philippines – 3 dead
- Thailand – 2 dead
- Malaysia – 2 dead
- Portugal – 2 dead
- Fiji – 2 dead
- Australia – 1 dead
- Spain – 1 dead
- Ireland – 1 dead
- Nepal – 1 dead
- Bangladesh – 1 dead
- Ghana – 1 dead
- Total: 24 dead

== See also ==
- 2006 East Timorese crisis
- In the Time of Madness – eye-witness account of the events leading up to and following the end of the Suharto regime
