= Aitarak =

Anti-independence militia in East Timor

- Leader: Eurico Guterres
- Dates active: 1999–2000
- Country: East Timor
- Headquarters: Dili, East Timor
- Active regions: Dili, East Timor
- Ideology: Indonesian nationalism
- Status: Defunct

Aitarak (Tetun for 'thorn') was the name of a pro-Indonesia militia group in East Timor during the late 1990s. On April 17, 1999, the group conducted 12 murders at the Manuel Carrascalão House massacre in Dili. That same month members took part in the Liquiçá Church massacre. At its height, the group was led by Eurico Guterres.

== History ==
In 1999, following the autonomy referendum, during which East Timor citizens voted to separate from Indonesia and become independent, Indonesian military forces began a slow withdrawal from East Timor. In the course of this, they practiced what is referred to as the Scorched Earth campaign, burning and destroying everything in their path.

They were assisted greatly in this by East Timorese pro-Indonesian militias. The militia groups for each district of East Timor were even more ruthless than the Indonesian military in most cases. Often, they knew their victims, and in many well-documented cases they had known their victims their entire lives, usually coming from the same villages or neighborhoods.

The Aitarak gained the most notoriety, because they were the main militia group in the capital city and Dili district as a whole. It was here where international press were most present, and then the reports were mostly about what happened in Dili itself, and therefore with the Aitarak. In May 9, suspected Aitarak militias opened fire on pro-independence rally in the downtown of Dili. During the first weeks of the crisis, the Aitarak militias participated in several arson and attacks against United Nations forces.

Cases such as the Liquiçá Church massacre, and the Suai Church massacre, as well as Catholic nuns that were killed in Lospalos were largely unknown for a time.

Due to the ruthless manner in which the Aitarak killed and raped, the group became infamous. They acted in a manner that indicated they had no fear of the press, or international reaction or consequences. In hindsight, it is quite apparent that the militia groups felt Indonesia would again gain control of East Timor, and those who had been faithful to the Indonesian government would be put in positions of power.

The exact number of victims killed by the Aitarak is unknown. It can easily be said that the number is in the hundreds. The most powerful of all the militias, Aitarak commanders could easily influence militia groups in other parts of East Timor, and did so on several occasions.

Although Indonesian military personnel and the government itself denied having any control over the militias, Indonesian military forces were present during nearly all the major incidents of mass murder. In the Liquiçá Church Massacre, investigators were baffled as to why none of the victims fled the immediate scene of the attack, until it was finally discovered through lengthy interviews that the church compound had been surrounded by Indonesian soldiers. The Indonesian military present did not enter and partake in the slaughter, but they did prevent any of the victims from fleeing.

=== The Aftermath of the crisis ===
Eurico Guterres, the commander of the Aitarak, held absolute control over not only the Aitarak, but also the Besi Merah Putih, and other militias throughout East Timor. Afterward, when suspects were being arrested and placed on trial for the carnage reaped on the East Timorese citizens during 1999, it was common to shift the blame to someone else. Militia members (Guterres included) regularly claimed that they acted on "orders" from someone else, or that they were merely a pawn with no control over what happened. Eurico Guterres was given 10 years in jail by the ad hoc Indonesian human rights tribunal, but is a free man today (as of February 2006) pending his Supreme Court Appeal. It is also well known that he is now involved with Indonesia's second largest political party, the PDI-P. Currently, Guterres militates in the Gerindra Party.
