= Suai Church massacre =

1999 massacre in East Timor

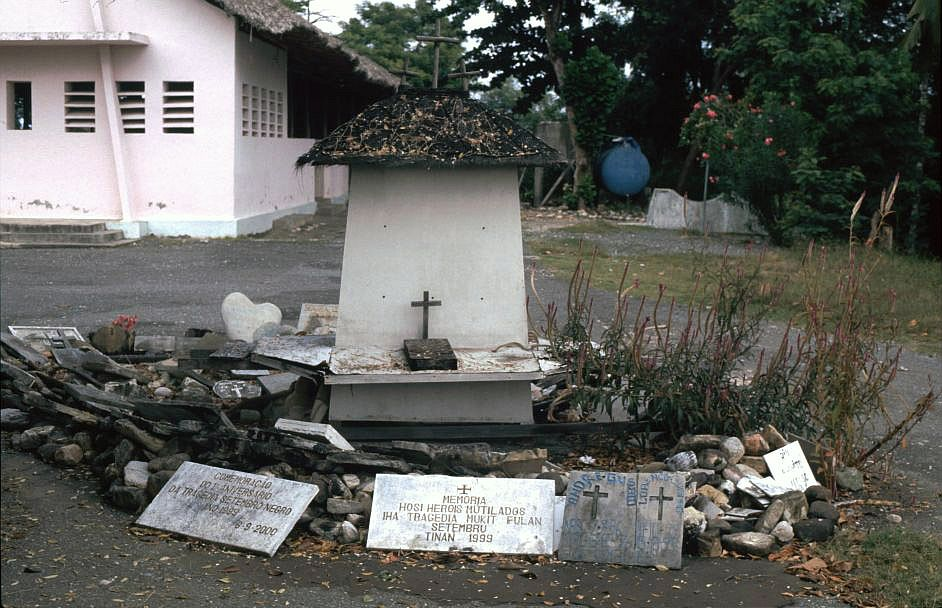
- Memorial in Suai dedicated to the victims of the massacre.
- Location: 9.3125°S 125.2556°E; Suai, Cova Lima District, East Timor
- Date: 6 September 1999 (UTC+9)
- Target: East Timorese civilians
- Attack type: Massacre
- Deaths: 200 (official source) 136 (another source)
- Injuries: 129
- Perpetrators: Indonesian militia and military

The Suai Church massacre occurred on 6 September 1999, in Suai, Cova Lima District in southwestern East Timor, two days after the results of the independence referendum were announced. Given the choice between autonomy within Indonesia or independence, 78.5% of the voters rejected autonomy. Three priests and a large number of civilians who had sought refuge in the church after a period of violent unrest were killed and many others injured.

== Background ==
This event took place during the 1999 East Timorese crisis, which had begun in April following the Indonesian government's 27 January announcement that the East Timorese people would be given the choice of autonomy or outright independence. Various pro-Indonesia militia groups systematically killed and raped civilians and destroyed property, with the acquiescence or active support of the Indonesian National Armed Forces (TNI) and Indonesian National Police (POLRI).

== Massacre ==
Several hundred people had sought refuge in the unfinished Ave Maria Church in the center of Suai from attacks of the pro-Indonesia Laksaur militia. The militia and the TNI surrounded the church. Father Tarsisius Dewanto went to the Suai POLRI police station for help and was told by the POLRI commander, Lieutenant Colonel Gatot Subiaktoro, that security would be provided.

At around 8 am on 6 September, a truck carrying TNI soldiers arrived and an officer spoke to one of the militia leaders. That afternoon, the militiamen and soldiers assaulted the church, first throwing grenades, then shooting and attacking with machetes the fleeing men, women and children, killing up to 200 people, including three priests. One witness testified that he saw one priest, Father Hilario Madeira, shot, followed by a machete attack on Father Francisco Soares.

On or about 7 September, TNI soldiers, including Lieutenant Colonel Mas Agus and Lieutenant Sugito, and militiamen removed some of the bodies. Around 27 bodies were later found buried in West Timor. A forensic expert accompanying a United Nations International Commission of Inquiry identified the three priests, 12 males, 8 females and 3 bodies of indeterminate sex. One was a child, two were teens, six were in their teens to mid-20s, 12 were middle-aged and two were elderly.

== Aftermath ==
In 2002, five Indonesian officials—Lieutenant Colonel Liliek Kusardiyanto, Captain Ahmad Syamsudin, Lieutenant Sugito, police Colonel Gatot Subiaktoro, and District Head Herman Sedyono—were tried in Indonesia for these crimes but were acquitted.

== See also ==
- List of massacres in Timor-Leste
