= Eurico Guterres =

Pro-Indonesia militia leader in East Timor

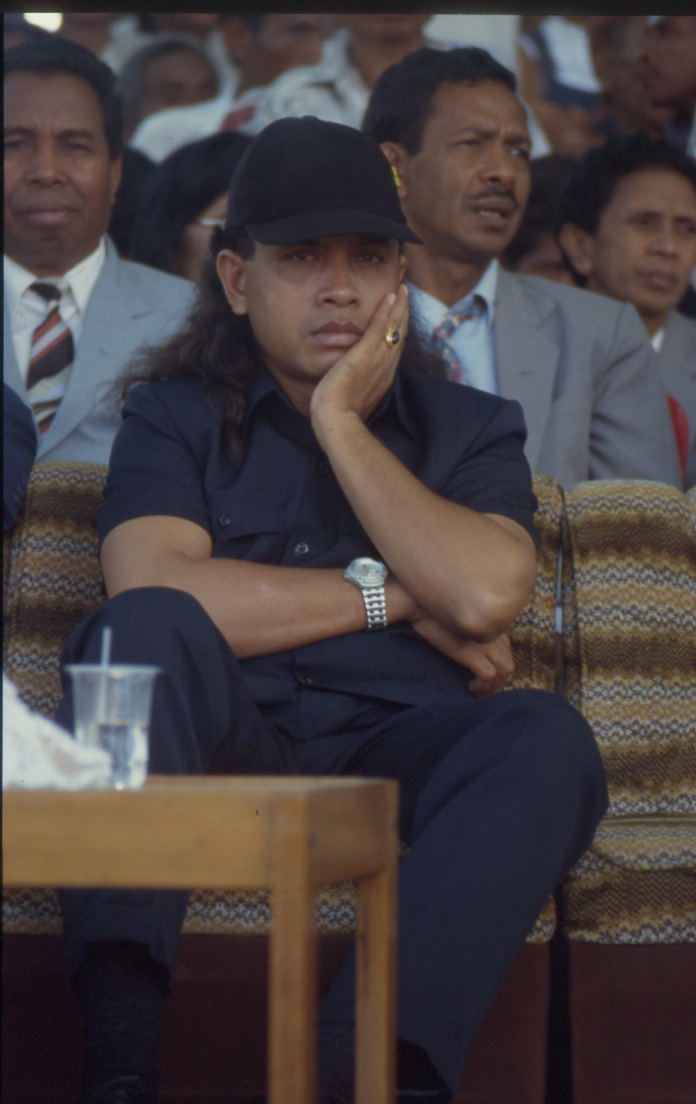
- Eurico Guterres in 1999
- Born: 4 July 1969 (age 57); Waitame, Uatolari, Viqueque, Portuguese Timor
- Military career
- Allegiance: Aitarak
- Service years: 1999–2000
- Other work: Leader of PAN East Nusa Tenggara (2005–2015)

Eurico Barros Gomes Guterres (born 4 July 1969) is an Indonesian anti-Timorese independence militiaman who was recruited by the Indonesian military during East Timor's bid for independence between 1999 and 2000. He was involved in several massacres in East Timor, and was a chief militia leader during the post-independence massacres and destruction of the capital Dili.

Indonesia officially convicted and sentenced Guterres to ten years imprisonment in November 2002, for which he was incarcerated in 2006 until 2008. In August 2003 he formed Laskar Merah Putih (The Red and White Warriors) in Indonesian Papua.

Elsham leader Aloysius Renwarin reported Guterres had 200 members consisting of Indonesian expatriates from Maluku, Timor and Sulawesi in December 2003 when Guterres requested the local government to provide his organisation offices in Timika, Papua.

== Background ==
Guterres was born in Uatulari (near Viqueque), East Timor. His parents were killed in 1976 by Indonesian TNI forces due to their known pro-Fretilin views. Guterres later accused Fretilin of their deaths, after his allegiance to Indonesia was established.

Young Guterres was brought up by an Indonesian civilian until he was sent to attend the Sacred Heart of Jesus Catholic school in Becora, Dili. He left senior high school and became involved in petty crime, including involvement in a government-protected gambling hall at Tacitolu, Dili.

In 1988, Indonesian military intelligence detained him for his alleged involvement in a plot to assassinate President Suharto, who was to visit Dili in October. At this time, Guterres switched from being pro-independence to being pro-Indonesia. He became an informant for the Army's Kopassus special forces and a double-agent against the independence movement, which expelled him around 1990.

A counter-insurgency officer, Prabowo Subianto, recruited Guterres into Gardapaksi in 1994, an organisation that gave cheap loans to start small businesses, but also used borrowers as informants and in pro-military vigilante squads. East Timor Governor José Abílio Osório Soares supported Gardapaksi, which developed a record of human rights abuse.

In 1997, with a high school certificate supposedly provided by the military, he began attending the Economics Institute in Dili. Though the Sekolah Tinggi Ilmu Ekonomi (STIE) was run by pro-integrationist Filomeno Hornay, Guterres attended only three semesters. He is married to the niece of Bishop Nascimento of Baucau, and has three children.

He is the primary suspect in the Liquiçá Church Massacre of April 1999, according to information gathered by the UNTAET Crime Scene Detachment. He was sentenced to 10 years of imprisonment in 2002 by a special court, and began serving his sentence in 2006. In April 2008, he was released from prison following an appeal to the Supreme Court of Indonesia.

He was part of the National Mandate Party (Partai Amanat Nasional or PAN) between 2003 and 2004. He served as leader of PAN East Nusa Tenggara from 2005 to 2015. And then became PAN East Nusa Tenggara Counselor and PAN Central Leader Council. In October 2017, he resigned from PAN, as several of his friends had earlier quit the party.

== See also ==
- East Timor genocide
- Pro-Indonesia militia
