= Laksaur =

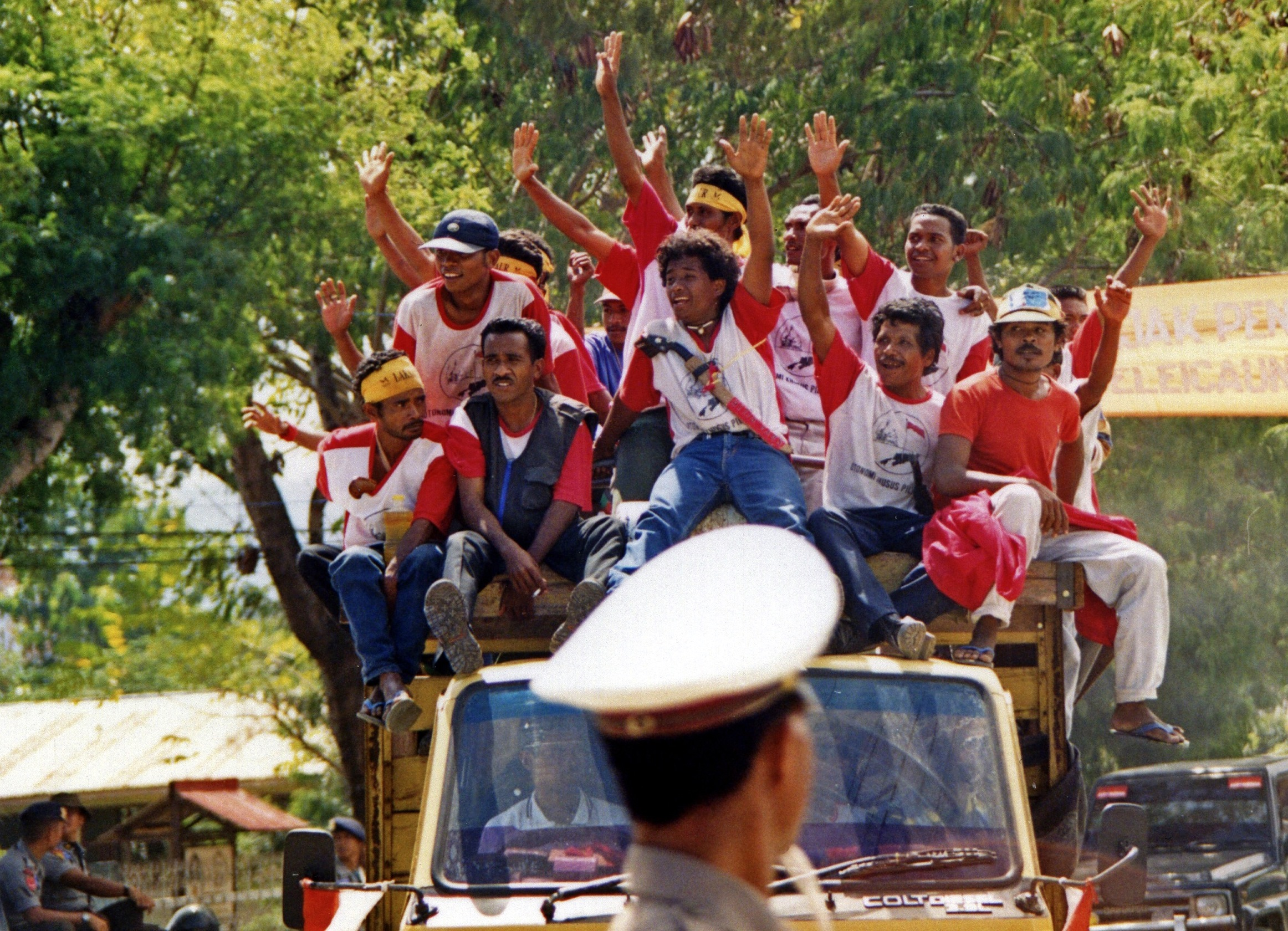
Laksaur members, 1999.

Laksaur was one of the pro-Indonesia militias which committed atrocities around the time of the referendum for independence in 1999 in East Timor. They are considered the principal agents in the Suai Church Massacre, which occurred a week after the referendum. They were believed to have been supported by the military of Indonesia.
