= Besi Merah Putih =

Militia group in East Timor

- Symbol of the BMP
- Leader: Manuel de Sousa
- Founded: December 27, 1998
- Dates active: 1999–2000
- Country: East Timor
- Headquarters: Maubara, East Timor
- Active regions: East Timor
- Political position: Right-wing
- Status: Defunct

Besi Merah Putih (also known as BMP), meaning 'red and white iron' in Indonesian, was the official name of an East Timor, approximately 200-strong, pro-Indonesia militia (Wanra). It operated in Maubara, in the district of Liquiçá, and in the neighbourhood of the river Lóis, west of the capital Dili, under the leadership of Manuel de Sousa and with the support of Leoneto Martins, the district administrator (Bupati) of Liquiçá. It was founded on 27 December 1998 in Cai-Cassa, East Timor. The current Indonesian president, Prabowo Subianto, had direct links to Besi Merah Putih and trained members at a Kopassus base near Bogor in West Java. Tomé Diogo is also rumoured to have direct links to the BMP. The Indonesian army member is said to have led the militia directly.

== Acts of murder, torture and intimidation ==
It was one of the most feared of all the militia in East Timor, and was responsible for the arson, murder, torture, rape, and intimidation of hundreds of East Timorese citizens during the 1999 pullout from East Timor by the military of Indonesia, and in the time leading up to the referendum for independence. The BMP were commanded by Manuel de Sousa, an East Timorese in support of the Indonesian rule over East Timor. During the months leading up to the East Timorese people voting for independence, the BMP held absolute control over the areas surrounding Liquica, as well as the town itself. In March 1999, international observers serving in Liquica, including several American police officers serving with the International Police (but at that time as unarmed observers) issued a report that read "The Besi Merah Putih surround a Carmelite convent in Maubara, some 60 km west of Dili yesterday and remain in place today. The militia threatened 'to kill any nun leaving the convent' because they were allegedly working for the resistance. A priest denied the charge, saying the nuns were providing aid to anyone in need 'regardless of colour, ideology or religion'."

Before committing a murder, BMP members have confessed that they all would drink a cocktail of alcohol, animal blood and drugs. Former members have also confessed to collecting trophies of those they killed, usually cutting away from the victim either an ear or a penis. The most notable acts of murder involving the BMP was the Liquica Church Massacre, which resulted in the deaths of more than 200 civilians.

On 11 December 2012, three members of the BMP were sentenced to prison. Faustino Filipe de Carvalho, the former suco leader of Ulmera, was sentenced to six years for illegal detention and deportation of civilians. Miguel Soares, who was active in Besite, received nine years in prison for his involvement in the murder of Francisco Brás. The BMP commander Salvador de Jesus was sentenced to 16 years for his involvement in the murder of Felix Barreto and Francisco Brás.

== International intervention ==
After the intervention of an international military force, led by Australia and New Zealand in mid-1999, BMP members fled into the rain forests of East Timor, or across the West Timor border into Indonesian territory. Many were later arrested by the International Police through strained but coordinated efforts with Indonesian authorities. A large number of members were indicted for their part in the Liquica Church Massacre following the UNTAET Crime Scene Detachment exhumations and murder investigations of late 1999 and into 2000.

Many other members attempted to integrate back into their former village homes in East Timor, but were often frightened away by enraged villagers, or at times killed. Several did for a time successfully integrate back into the villages of Buku Mara and Bazartete, given the job of being a servant to the other villagers, chopping and gathering firewood or cleaning. However, many of those who were integrated disappeared, with International authorities being unable to verify their whereabouts when attempting to locate them for questioning. It was suspected that they were killed by the village inhabitants in retaliation to their prior acts of violence against their own people.
