= Maria Olandina Isabel Caeiro Alves =

Timorese diplomat

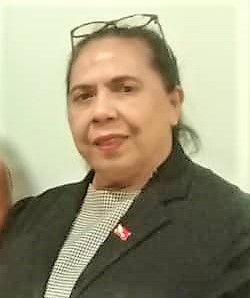
- Born: March 20, 1956; Ermera, Portuguese Timor
- Died: March 31, 2025 (aged 69); Kuala Lumpur, Malaysia
- Occupations: Activist, diplomat

Maria Olandina Isabel Caeiro Alves (March 20, 1956 – March 31, 2025) was an East Timorese activist and diplomat.

A co-founder of the organization East Timor Women Against Violence, she was imprisoned for her opposition to Indonesian rule in East Timor. After independence, she served on the Commission for Reception, Truth and Reconciliation in East Timor and later represented her country as an envoy to Malaysia and Vietnam.

== Early life ==
In 1956, Maria Olandina Isabel Caeiro Alves was born in Ermera, in what was then Portuguese Timor. (Some sources instead give her birth date as November 2, 1951.)

She trained to become a primary school teacher.

== Activities during the Indonesian occupation ==
Olandina Caeiro became heavily involved in the resistance to the Indonesian occupation of East Timor in the late 20th century. At the start of the occupation, in 1975, she co-founded the newspaper Voz de Timor, and she used her platform there and as a broadcaster on Radio Maubere to speak out against the occupiers.

In December 1975, she was arrested by the authorities and brought to a prison in Kupang. She had been pregnant at the time of her arrest and was forced to give birth in prison, where she would remain for four years and experience torture at the hands of her captors. Her husband, a Falintil fighter, was lost in the conflict during her imprisonment.

After her release, she managed to obtain work as a civil servant under Indonesian rule, while still organizing for East Timorese independence. In 1992, she was arrested again, after which she lost both her home and her job, and she subsequently made ends meet by opening a restaurant. But she did not abandon her involvement in politics, serving in East Timor province's parliament from 1997 to 1999.

In tandem with her efforts toward independence, Olandina Caeiro advocated for women's rights, co-founding East Timor Women Against Violence (ETWAVE), which was initially known as GERTAK. In November 1998, while serving as president of the organization, she led a major protest against gender-related violence. She also served on Indonesia's National Commission on Violence against Women beginning in 1998.

At the end of the 1990s, Olandina Caeiro feared for her life and went into exile in Lisbon, Portugal.

== Post-independence ==
After East Timor gained independence at the turn of the 21st century, Olandina Caeiro returned and was increasingly involved in the new country's politics.

She was a member of the Commission for Reception, Truth and Reconciliation in East Timor, which investigated human rights violations during the occupation, as well as the bilateral Indonesia–Timor Leste Commission of Truth and Friendship. She also helped set up the structure of the new state, serving as commissioner of the Civil Service Commission during the transition in 2001. In 2009, she was appointed to the newly established Public Service Commission.

Olandina Caeiro continued her women's rights activism, serving as president of the Rede Feto, an umbrella organization for East Timorese women's groups, beginning in 2003.

In her later years, she became a diplomat, representing East Timor as consul general in Denpasar, Indonesia, from 2011 to 2015, and as ambassador in Malaysia and Vietnam beginning in 2017 and 2021, respectively. She served as ambassador to Vietnam until May 22, 2024.

== Death ==
Olandina Caeiro died in 2025 in Kuala Lumpur, Malaysia, where she traveled for medical treatment.
