= East Timor and Indonesia Action Network =

Nonprofit organization

The East Timor and Indonesia Action Network
- Founded: November 1991
- Purpose: Protecting human rights, justice and self-determination in Indonesia.
- Origins: Formed, in response to the Dili massacre, to restore independence to East Timor
- Region served: Indonesia and East Timor (Timor-Leste)
- Key people: John M. Miller, National Coordinator
- Revenue: Donations
- Website: etan.org
- Its founding goal achieved in 2001, ETAN updated its mission statement

The East Timor and Indonesia Action Network (ETAN) is a nonprofit US organization supporting human rights throughout Southeast Asia and Oceania. ETAN was founded in 1991 to support the right to self-determination of Timor-Leste. In 1999, that goal was significantly realized when the people of East Timor voted for independence. Since then ETAN has focused on building on its success in support of justice and self-determination in Timor-Leste and the surrounding region.

== Profile ==
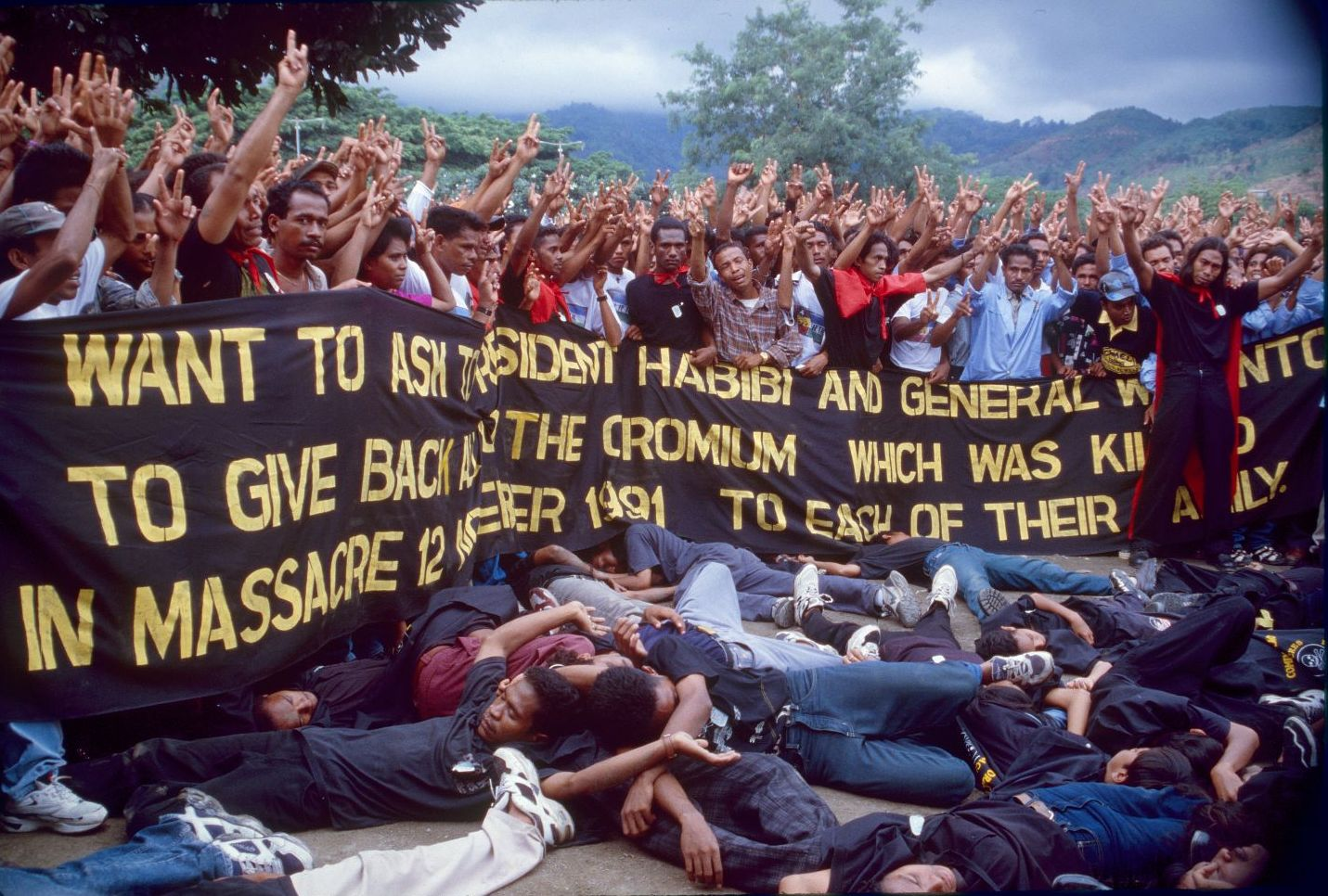
An ETAN 'die-in' reenacting, and in protest of, the Santa Cruz Dili massacre

The human rights organization ETAN has a 20-year record of successful advocacy for the people of Timor-Leste and Indonesia.

From the ETAN website: "The East Timor and Indonesia Action Network (ETAN) was founded in November 1991 to support genuine self-determination and human rights for the people of East Timor in accordance with the Universal Declaration of Human Rights, the 1960 United Nations General Assembly Resolution on Decolonization, and Security Council and General Assembly resolutions on East Timor."

=== History of Timor ===
==== Colonial Timor ====
A small country in Southeast Asia, comprising the eastern half of the island of Timor, the nearby islands of Atauro and Jaco, the country of Timor has a history marked not only by the colonization common to Southeast Asia, but repeated violence against democratic and independence movements.

Trade with Portugal began in the early 16th century. Timor's colonial history lasted over 400 years, from the Portuguese colonization of the mid-16th century, to 1975 - Imperial Japan having briefly occupied East Timor from 1942 to 1945. East Timor declared itself independent from Portugal on 28 November 1975.

==== Indonesian invasion and occupation ====
Nine days after the 1975 declaration of independence, East Timor was invaded and occupied by Indonesian forces and incorporated into Indonesia. The subsequent occupation (1974–1999) saw an estimated 102,800 conflict-related deaths (approximately 18,600 killings and 84,200 'excess' deaths from hunger and illness).

On 30 August 1999, in a UN-sponsored referendum, East Timor voted, by an overwhelming majority, for independence from Indonesia. Again, immediately following a vote for independence, violence was used to quash the democratic process of independence. Militias organised and supported by the Indonesian military commenced a scorched-earth campaign, killing approximately 1,400 Timorese and displacing 300,000 people to West Timor, and destroying the country's infrastructure. The International Force for East Timor (INTERFET) was deployed to the country and brought the violence to an end. The United Nations took over administration for a transition period, establishing the Truth and Reconciliation Commission to investigate events of the occupation period. East Timor was internationally recognised as an independent state in 2002.

Whereas Indonesia invaded East Timor by force, another form of occupation was bequeathed to Indonesia by the borders established by occupying imperial forces when they left Papua New Guinea. It remains split into the western provinces, Papua and West Papua (now with additions with Southwest, South, Central and Highland Papua since 2022) occupied by Indonesia and recognized by the world community as part of Indonesia, and Papua New Guinea 'proper'. Timor thus has resistance to Indonesian occupation in common with New Guinea.

==== Dili massacre ====
A crowd of several thousand on its way from a memorial service to a nearby graveyard was attacked by 200 soldiers, killing over 250 funeral goers, in what was later called the Dili Massacre, or Santa Cruz massacre, on 12 November 1991. Although it was only one of many incidents of violence committed by the Indonesian military, and one of four mass killings - the other three being at Quelicai, Lacluta, and Kraras - its scale, timing, and press coverage made it a rallying cry for the independence movement and created supporters abroad. It politicized many, and galvanized pro-independence East Timorese. A burgeoning East Timor solidarity movement grew in Portugal, Australia, and the United States. US ties with Indonesia were cut in 1991 and further in 1999, and not restored until 2005.

=== Formation of ETAN ===
"ETAN was founded following the November 12 Santa Cruz massacre of more than 270 peaceful protestors in a cemetery in Dili, Timor-Leste. The few western reporters present exposed the brutality of the occupying Indonesian military. ETAN was founded to support Timor-Leste’s right to self-determination and to end U.S. military and political support for the illegal occupation." - ETAN website

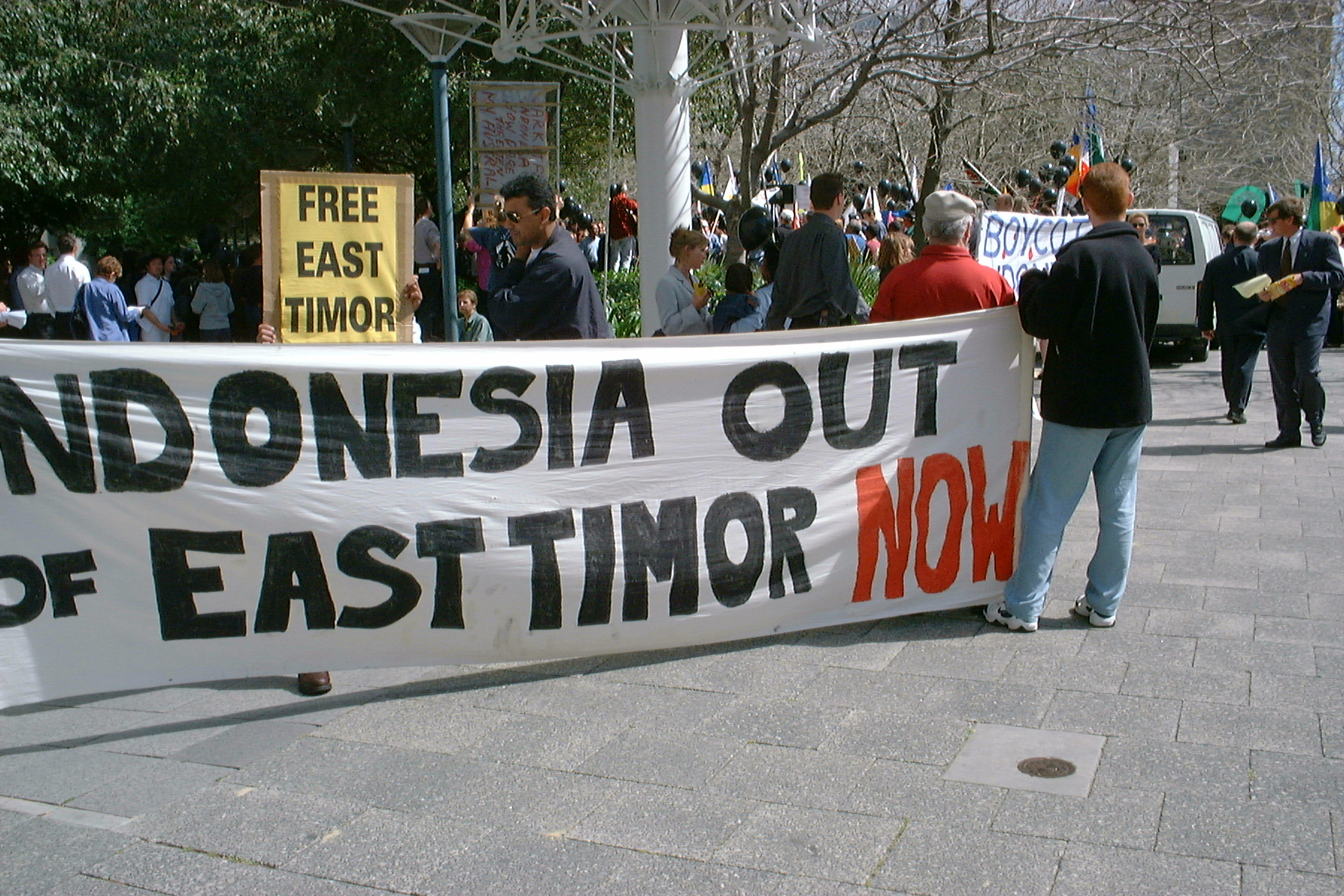
Demonstrations are a worldwide response, of which ETAN is a part, to the invasion and occupation of East Timor by Indonesia.

== Activism work ==
ETAN has co-produced the West Papua Report with the West Papua Advocacy Team since November 2007.

In spring of 2007, East Timor held its first national elections since independence; civic groups in East Timor, seeking help in monitoring the election process, requested aid from ETAN, which formed the Solidarity Observer Mission for East Timor Observer Project in response.

=== Political positions ===
ETAN has actively supported independence from Indonesia, for the western provinces of New Guinea, since 2007.

The 2005 bilateral Indonesia–Timor Leste Commission of Truth and Friendship, sponsored by the UN, in 2008 released its findings on what it called Indonesia's "organized campaign of violence" and "gross human rights violations in the form of crimes against humanity." ETAN welcomed Indonesian president Susilo Bambang Yudhoyono's acknowledgement of the facts uncovered by the commission, but pointed out that there have been no repercussions for any Indonesian officials to redress what the commission called "institutional responsibility".

ETAN addresses a wide range of concerns, including US policy in the Southeast Asia / Oceania region, oil and gas exploitation, reparations and accountability for past and present human rights violations. It supports the rights of the West Papuan people and the independence of West Papua from Indonesia.

ETAN is opposed to the oil and gas deal: Treaty on Certain Maritime Arrangements in the Timor Sea (CMATS), in the Greater Sunrise area. US national coordinator for ETAN John Miller wrote the Australian government, saying "Australia has put its own and some oil companies’ short-term financial interests over fundamental principles of democracy, the rule of law, economic justice, and respect for national sovereignty.", although he also extended an olive branch by saying "It is true that under CMATS, Timor-Leste will receive a greater share of its resources than...(under)...the International Unitization Agreement."

ETAN eschews slogans. Its original mission was achieved in 2001, and much remains to be achieved in its current scope; its homepage is dedicated to the most recent issues affecting the southeast Asian area or the occasional endorsement from political leaders.

=== Order of Timor ===
In May 2012, the 10th anniversary of Timor-Leste's independence, ETAN was awarded the government of Timor-Leste highest honor, the Order of Timor-Leste (Ordem de Timor-Leste), for its work in support of the liberation of the country.

=== Campaigning ===
ETAN is a non-profit organization which receives donations from the public. Based in the United States, its supporters campaign worldwide.

Between 1991 and 1995 the East Timor Action Network expanded from a tiny handful of people dispersed around the country to a dozen local chapters, doubling again in size over the next four years to include more than 10,000 supporters and a core of several dozen committed activists. In addition to establishing credibility in the progressive and human rights community, ETAN established a reputation as a reliable source of information for journalists, scholars, policymakers, and NGO activists. - "Solidarity in an Age of Globalization: The Transnational Movement for East Timor and U.S. Foreign Policy", by Brad Simpson. Peace and Change, Vol. 29, No. 3&4, July 2004

== See also ==
- Free Papua Movement
- National Committee for West Papua
- Benny Wenda - Papuan activist
