= Indonesian occupation of East Timor =

1975–1999 illegal annexation of Portuguese Timor

- Part of the Cold War and the decolonisation of Asia
| Date | 7 December 1975 – 31 October 1999 (23 years, 10 months, 3 weeks and 3 days); De jure: 7 December 1975 – 20 May 2002 (26 years, 5 months, 1 week and 6 days) |
| Location | East Timor |
| Result | 1999 East Timorese crisis |
| Territorial changes | East Timor gains independence after an independence referendum votes to become an independent sovereign state |

Belligerents
| Indonesia; Timor Timur; Pro-Indonesian East Timorese factions; UDT (Note: until 1986); APODETI; KOTA (Note: until 1998); Trabalhista (Note: until 1986) | (Timor-Leste) Democratic Republic of East Timor (Until 1976); East Timorese Resistance Groups; Fretilin; Falintil; CNRM (Note: later CNRT); UDT (Note: from 1986) |

Commanders and leaders
| Suharto; Maraden Panggabean; Mohammad Jusuf; L. B. Moerdani; Try Sutrisno; Edi Sudrajat; Feisal Tanjung; Wiranto; Dading Kalbuadi; Prabowo Subianto; José Abílio Osório Soares; Eurico Guterres | Francisco Xavier do Amaral (surrendered); Nicolau dos Reis Lobato †; Mari Alkatiri; Taur Matan Ruak; Nino Konis Santana †; Ma'huno Bulerek Karathayano (surrendered); Xanana Gusmão (surrendered); Rogério Lobato; David Alex †; Keri Laran Sabalae † |

Strength
| 250,000 | 27,000 (including non combatant in 1975); 1,900 (including non combatant in 1999); 12,538 fighters (1975–1999) |

Casualties and losses
| 2,277 soldier and police killed 1,527 Timorese militia killed 2,400 wounded Total: 3,408 killed and 2,400 wounded | 11,907 fighters killed (1975–1999); 6,470 non combatant killed (including civilians and foreigner supporter); Total: 18,377 killed |
- Estimates range from 100,000–300,000 civilians dead (see below)

The Indonesian occupation of East Timor began in December 1975 and lasted until October 1999. After centuries of Portuguese colonial rule in East Timor, the 1974 Carnation Revolution in Portugal led to the decolonisation of its former colonies, creating instability in East Timor and leaving its future uncertain. After a small-scale civil war, the pro-independence Fretilin declared victory in the capital city of Dili and declared an independent East Timor on 28 November 1975.

Following the "Balibo Declaration" that was signed by representatives of Apodeti, UDT, KOTA and the Trabalhista Party on 30 November 1975, Indonesian military forces invaded East Timor on 7 December 1975, and by 1979 they had all but destroyed the armed resistance to the occupation. On 17 July 1976, Indonesia formally annexed East Timor as its 27th province and declared the province of Timor Timur (East Timor).

Immediately after the invasion, the United Nations General Assembly and Security Council passed resolutions condemning Indonesia's actions in East Timor and calling for its immediate withdrawal from the territory. Although the United States, Japan, Canada and Malaysia, also supported the Indonesian government, Australia and Indonesia were the only nations in the world which recognised East Timor as a province of Indonesia, and began negotiations to divide resources found in the Timor Gap.

For twenty-four years, the Indonesian government subjected the people of East Timor to routine and systematic torture, sexual slavery, internment, forced disappearances, extrajudicial executions, massacres, and deliberate starvation. The 1991 Santa Cruz massacre caused outrage around the world and reports of other such killings were numerous. Resistance to Indonesian rule remained strong, and in 1996 the Nobel Peace Prize was awarded to two men from East Timor, Carlos Filipe Ximenes Belo and José Ramos-Horta, for their ongoing efforts to peacefully end the occupation.

A 1999 vote to determine East Timor's future resulted in an overwhelming majority in favour of independence, and in 2002 East Timor became an independent nation. The Commission for Reception, Truth and Reconciliation in East Timor estimated the number of deaths during the occupation from famine and violence to be between 90,800 and 202,600, including between 17,600 and 19,600 violent deaths or disappearances, out of a 1999 population of approximately 823,386. The truth commission held Indonesian forces responsible for initiating the conflict, and about 70% of the violent killings.

After the 1999 vote for independence, paramilitary groups working with the Indonesian military undertook a final wave of violence during which most of the country's infrastructure was destroyed. The Australian-led International Force for East Timor restored order, and following the departure of Indonesian forces from East Timor, the United Nations Transitional Administration in East Timor administered the territory for two years, establishing a Serious Crimes Unit to investigate and prosecute crimes committed in 1999. Its limited scope and the small number of sentences delivered by Indonesian courts have caused numerous observers to call for an international tribunal for East Timor.

Oxford University held an academic consensus calling the occupation of East Timor a genocide and Yale University teaches it as part of its Genocide Studies program. The invasion of East Timor and the suppression of its independence movement caused great harm to Indonesia's reputation and international credibility.

== Background ==
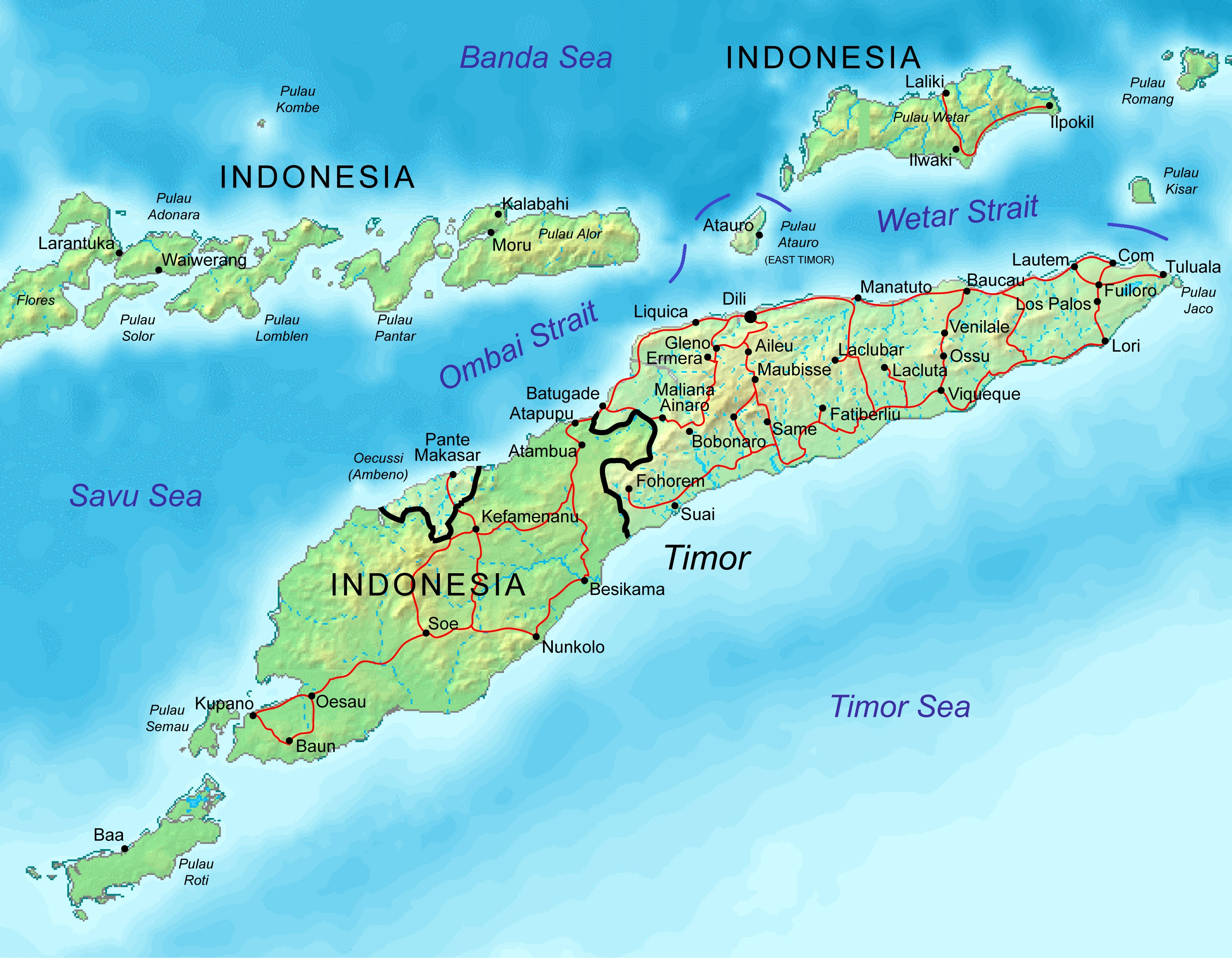
Map of Timor island, showing the political boundary and its major cities

The Portuguese first arrived in Timor in the 16th century, and in 1702 East Timor came under Portuguese colonial administration. Portuguese rule was tenuous until the island was divided with the Dutch Empire in 1860. A significant battleground during the Pacific War, East Timor was occupied by 20,000 Japanese troops. The fighting helped prevent a Japanese occupation of Australia but resulted in 60,000 East Timorese deaths.

When Indonesia secured its independence after World War II under the leadership of Sukarno, it did not claim control of East Timor, and aside from general anti-colonial rhetoric, it did not oppose Portuguese control of the territory. A 1959 revolt in East Timor against the Portuguese was not endorsed by the Indonesian government. A 1962 United Nations document notes: "the government of Indonesia has declared that it maintains friendly relations with Portugal and has no claim to Portuguese Timor..." These assurances continued after Suharto took power in 1965. An Indonesian official declared in December 1974: "Indonesia has no territorial ambition... Thus there is no question of Indonesia wishing to annex Portuguese Timor."

In 1974, the Carnation Revolution in Portugal caused significant changes in Portugal's relationship with its colony in Timor. The power shift in Europe invigorated movements for independence in colonies like Mozambique and Angola, and the new Portuguese government began a decolonisation process for East Timor. The first of these was an opening of the political process.

=== Fretilin, UDT, and APODETI ===
When East Timorese political parties were first legalised in April 1974, three groupings emerged as significant players in the post-colonial landscape. The União Democrática Timorense (Timorese Democratic Union, or UDT), was formed in May by a group of wealthy landowners. Initially dedicated to preserving East Timor as a protectorate of Portugal, in September UDT announced its support for independence. A week later, the Frente Revolucionária de Timor-Leste Independente (Revolutionary Front for an Independent East Timor, or Fretilin) appeared. Initially organised as the ASDT (Associacão Social Democrata Timorense), the group endorsed "the universal doctrines of socialism", as well as "the right to independence". As the political process grew more tense, however, the group changed its name and declared itself "the only legitimate representative of the people". The end of May saw the creation of a third party, Associacão Popular Democratica Timorense (Timorese Popular Democratic Association, or APODETI). Advocating East Timor's integration with Indonesia and originally named Associacão Integraciacao de Timor Indonesia (Association for the Integration of Timor into Indonesia), APODETI expressed concerns that an independent East Timor would then be economically weak and vulnerable.

Fretilin took power after the civil war and declared an independent East Timor on 28 November 1975.

Indonesian nationalist and military hardliners, particularly leaders of the intelligence agency Kopkamtib and special operations unit, Kopassus, saw the Portuguese revolution as an opportunity for East Timor's integration with Indonesia. The central government and military feared that an East Timor governed by leftists could be used as a base for incursions by unfriendly powers into Indonesia, and also that an independent East Timor within the archipelago could inspire secessionist sentiments within Indonesian provinces. The fear of national disintegration was played upon military leaders close to Suharto and remained as one of Indonesia's strongest justifications for refusing to entertain the prospect of East Timorese independence or even autonomy until the late 1990s. The military intelligence organisations initially sought a non-military annexation strategy, intending to use APODETI as its integration vehicle.

In January 1975, UDT and Fretilin established a tentative coalition dedicated to achieving independence for East Timor. At the same time, the Australian government reported that the Indonesian military had conducted a "pre-invasion" exercise at Lampung. For months, the Indonesian Special Operations command, Kopassus, had been covertly supporting APODETI through Operasi Komodo (Operation Komodo, named after the lizard). By broadcasting accusations of communism among Fretilin leaders and sowing discord in the UDT coalition, the Indonesian government fostered instability in East Timor and, observers said, created a pretext for invading. By May tensions between the two groups caused UDT to withdraw from the coalition.

In an attempt to negotiate a settlement to the dispute over East Timor's future, the Portuguese Decolonization Commission convened a conference in June 1975 in Macau. Fretilin boycotted the meeting in protest of APODETI's presence; representatives of UDT and APODETI complained that this was an effort to obstruct the decolonisation process. In his 1987 memoir Funu: The Unfinished Saga of East Timor, Fretilin leader José Ramos-Horta recalls his "vehement protests" against his party's refusal to attend the meeting. "This", he writes, "was one of our tactical political errors for which I could never find an intelligent explanation."

=== Coup, civil war, and independence declaration ===
The tension reached a boiling point in mid-1975 when rumours began circulating of possible power seizures from both independence parties. In August 1975, UDT staged a coup in the capital city Dili, and a small-scale civil war broke out. Ramos-Horta describes the fighting as "bloody", and details violence committed by both UDT and Fretilin. He cites the International Committee of the Red Cross, which counted 2,000–3,000 people dead after the war. The fighting forced the Portuguese government onto the nearby island of Atauro. Fretilin defeated UDT's forces after two weeks, much to the surprise of Portugal and Indonesia. UDT leaders fled to Indonesian-controlled West Timor. There they signed a petition on 7 September calling for East Timor's integration with Indonesia; most accounts indicate that UDT's support for this position was forced by Indonesia.

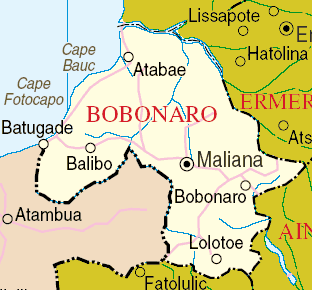
Map of East Timor's Bobonaro District, which lies on the border with Indonesian West Timor. Fighting continued in this region after the civil war, and several cities were captured by Indonesia prior to their full invasion.

Once they had gained control of East Timor, Fretilin faced attacks from the west, by Indonesian military forces—then known as Angkatan Bersenjata Republik Indonesia (ABRI)—and by a small group of UDT troops. Indonesia captured the border city of Batugadé on 8 October 1975; nearby Balibó and Maliana were taken eight days later. During the Balibó raid, members of an Australian television news crew—later dubbed the "Balibo Five"—were killed by Indonesian soldiers. Indonesian military officials say the deaths were accidental, and East Timorese witnesses say the journalists were deliberately killed. The deaths, and subsequent campaigns and investigations, attracted international attention and rallied support for East Timorese independence.

At the start of November, the foreign ministers from Indonesia and Portugal met in Rome to discuss a resolution of the conflict. Although no Timorese leaders were invited to the talks, Fretilin sent a message expressing their desire to work with Portugal. The meeting ended with both parties agreeing that Portugal would meet with political leaders in East Timor, but the talks never took place. In mid-November, Indonesian forces began shelling the city of Atabae from the sea and captured it by the end of the month.

Frustrated by Portugal's inaction, Fretilin leaders believed they could ward off Indonesian advances more effectively if they declared an independent East Timor. National Political Commissioner Mari Alkatiri conducted a diplomatic tour of Africa, gathering support from governments there and elsewhere.

According to Fretilin, this effort yielded assurances from twenty-five countries—including the People's Republic of China, the Soviet Union, Mozambique, Sweden, and Cuba—to recognise the new nation. Cuba currently shares close relations with East Timor today. On 28 November 1975, Fretilin unilaterally declared independence for the Democratic Republic of East Timor. Indonesia announced UDT and APODETI leaders in and around Balibó would respond the next day by declaring that region independent from East Timor and officially part of Indonesia. This Balibo Declaration, however, was drafted by Indonesian intelligence and signed on Bali; later this was described by some as the 'Balibohong Declaration', a pun on the Indonesian word for 'lie'. Portugal rejected both declarations, and the Indonesian government approved military action to begin its annexation of East Timor.

== Invasion ==
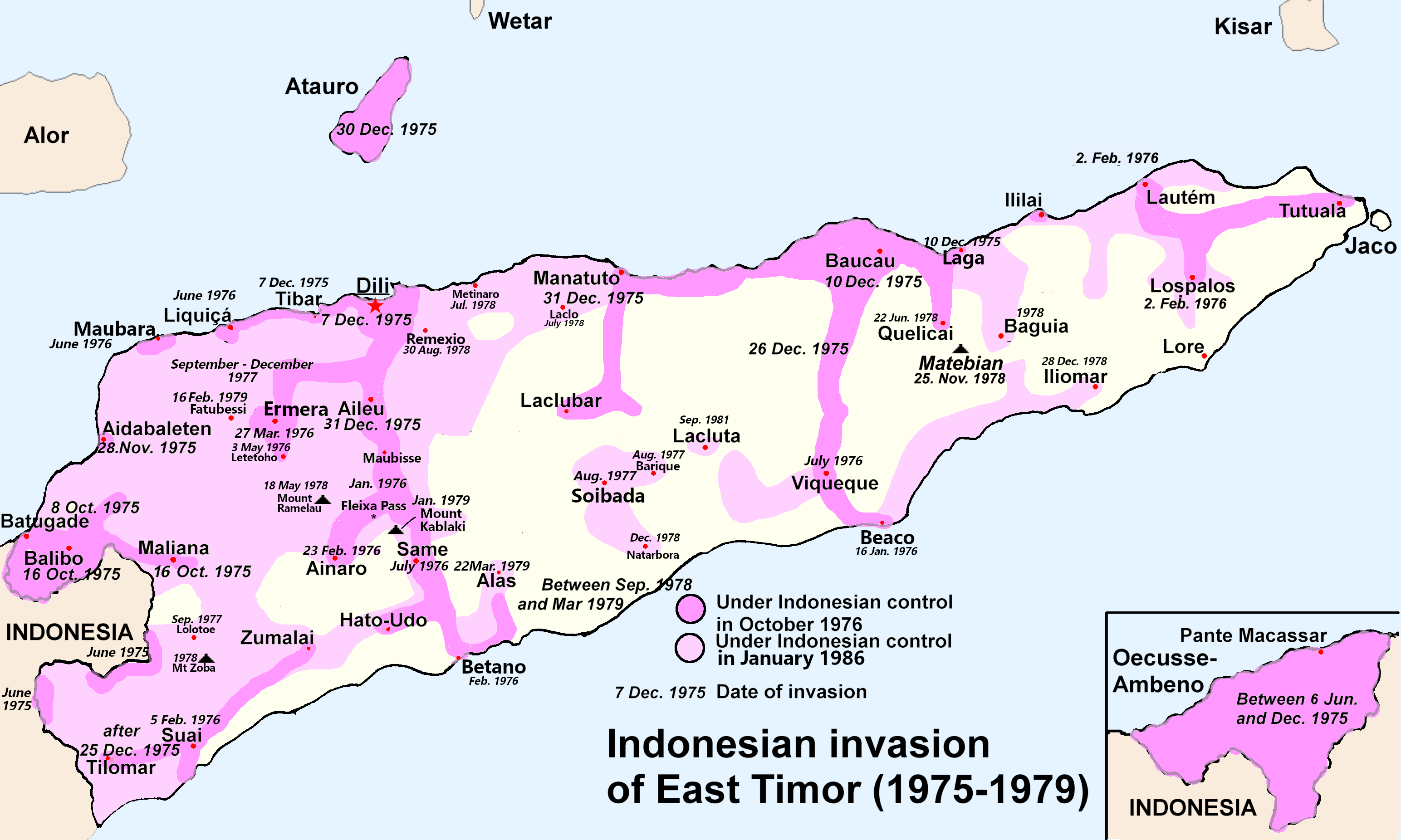
Indonesian invasion

On 7 December 1975, Indonesian forces invaded East Timor. Operasi Seroja (Operation Lotus) was the largest military operation ever carried out by that nation. Troops from Fretilin's military organisation Falintil engaged ABRI forces in the streets of Dili and reported 400 Indonesian paratroopers were killed as they descended into the city. Angkasa Magazine reports 35 dead Indonesian troops and 122 from the Fretilin side. By the end of the year, 10,000 troops occupied Dili, and another 20,000 had been deployed throughout East Timor. Massively outnumbered, Falintil troops fled to the mountains and continued guerrilla combat operations.

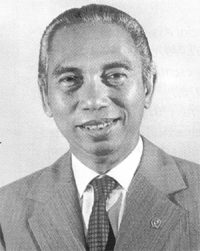
Indonesian Foreign Minister Adam Malik suggested that the number of East Timorese killed in the first two years of the occupation was "50,000 people or perhaps 80,000".

=== Indonesian atrocities ===
From the start of the invasion onward, TNI forces engaged in the wholesale massacre of Timorese civilians. At the start of the occupation, Fretilin radio sent the following broadcast: "The Indonesian forces are killing indiscriminately. Women and children are being shot in the streets. We are all going to be killed.... This is an appeal for international help. Please do something to stop this invasion." One Timorese refugee told later of "rape [and] cold-blooded assassinations of women and children and Chinese shop owners". Dili's bishop at the time, Martinho da Costa Lopes, said later: "The soldiers who landed started killing everyone they could find. There were many dead bodies in the streets – all we could see were the soldiers killing, killing, killing." In one incident, a group of fifty men, women, and children – including Australian freelance reporter Roger East – were lined up on a cliff outside of Dili and shot, their bodies falling into the sea. Many such massacres took place in Dili, where onlookers were ordered to observe and count aloud as each person was executed. It is estimated that at least 2,000 Timorese were massacred in the first two days of the invasion in Dili alone. In addition to Fretilin supporters, Chinese migrants were also singled out for execution; five hundred were killed in the first day alone.

The mass killings continued unabated as Indonesian forces advanced on the Fretilin-held mountain regions of East Timor. A Timorese guide for a senior Indonesian officer told former Australian consul to Portuguese Timor James Dunn that during the early months of the fighting TNI troops "killed most Timorese they encountered." In February 1976 after capturing the village of Aileu – to the south of Dili – and driving out the remaining Fretilin forces, Indonesian troops machine-gunned most of the town's population, allegedly shooting everyone over the age of three. The young children who were spared were taken back to Dili in trucks. At the time Aileu fell to Indonesian forces, the population was around 5,000; by the time Indonesian relief workers visited the village in September 1976 only 1,000 remained. In June 1976, TNI troops badly battered by a Fretilin attack exacted retribution against a large refugee camp housing 5–6,000 Timorese at Lamaknan near the West Timor border. After setting several houses on fire, Indonesian soldiers massacred as many as 2,000 men, women and children.

In March 1977 ex-Australian consul James Dunn published a report detailing charges that since December 1975 Indonesian forces had killed between 50,000 and 100,000 civilians in East Timor. This is consistent with a statement made on 13 February 1976 by UDT leader Lopez da Cruz that 60,000 Timorese had been killed during the previous six months of civil war, suggesting a death toll of at least 55,000 in the first two months of the invasion. A delegation of Indonesian relief workers agreed with this statistic. A late 1976 report by the Catholic Church also estimated the death toll at between 60,000 and 100,000. These figures were also corroborated by those in the Indonesian government itself. In an interview on 5 April 1977 with the Sydney Morning Herald, Indonesian Foreign Minister Adam Malik said the number of dead was "50,000 people or perhaps 80,000".

The Indonesian government presented its annexation of East Timor as a matter of anti-colonial unity. A 1977 booklet from the Indonesian Department of Foreign Affairs, entitled Decolonization in East Timor, paid tribute to the "sacred right of self-determination" and recognised APODETI as the true representatives of the East Timorese majority. It claimed that Fretilin's popularity was the result of a "policy of threats, blackmail and terror". Later, Indonesian Foreign Minister Ali Alatas reiterated this position in his 2006 memoir The Pebble in the Shoe: The Diplomatic Struggle for East Timor. The island's original division into east and west, Indonesia argued after the invasion, was "the result of colonial oppression" enforced by the Portuguese and Dutch imperial powers. Thus, according to the Indonesian government, its annexation of the 27th province was merely another step in the unification of the archipelago which had begun in the 1940s.

=== UN response and international law ===
On the day following the invasion, a committee of the United Nations General Assembly convened to debate the situation. Nations allied with Indonesia—including India, Japan, and Malaysia—wrote a resolution blaming Portugal and the Timorese political parties for the bloodshed; it was rejected in favour of a draft prepared by Algeria, Cuba, Senegal, and Guyana, among others. This was adopted as GA Resolution 3485 (XXX) on 12 December, calling on Indonesia to "withdraw without delay". Ten days later, the United Nations Security Council unanimously adopted Resolution 384 (1975), which echoes the GA resolution's call for immediate Indonesian withdrawal. One year later the Security Council expressed the same sentiment in Resolution 389 (1976), and the General Assembly passed resolutions every year between 1976 and 1982 calling for self-determination in East Timor. Governments of large countries like China and the United States opposed further action; smaller countries like Costa Rica, Guinea-Bissau, and Iceland were the only delegations calling for vigorous enforcement of the resolutions. The 1982 resolution calls on the UN secretary-general to "initiate consultations with all parties directly concerned, with a view to exploring avenues for achieving a comprehensive settlement of the problem".

Legal expert Roger S. Clark notes that Indonesia's invasion and occupation violated two vital elements of international law: the right to self-determination and the prohibition on aggression. Neither the petition of 7 September 1975 calling for integration, nor the later resolution of the "People's Assembly" in May 1976, qualify as "informed and democratic processes impartially conducted and based on universal adult suffrage", as required by UN General Assembly Resolution 1541 (XV), which establishes the guidelines for the norms of self-determination. Other inadequacies existed in the petitions as well.

Indonesia's use of military force in East Timor is cited as a violation of Chapter I of the United Nations Charter, which states: "All Members shall refrain in their international relations from the threat or use of force against the territorial integrity or political independence of any state...." Some observers have argued that East Timor was not a state at the time of the invasion, and is thus not protected by the UN Charter. This claim mirrors those made against Indonesia by the Dutch during the Indonesian National Revolution. As legal scholar Susan Marks points out, if East Timor was considered a Portuguese colony, then although "there may be some doubt about the application of this provision [of UN Charter Chapter I] in the context of an armed conflict between a colonial power and its own colony, there can hardly be doubt that it applies to force by one sovereign state against another state's colony".

== Indonesian hegemony ==
On 17 December, Indonesia formed the Provisional Government of East Timor (PSTT) which was headed by Arnaldo dos Reis Araújo of APODETI as president and Lopez da Cruz of UDT. Most sources describe this institution as a creation of the Indonesian military. One of PSTT's first activities was the formation of a "Popular Assembly" consisting of elected representatives and leaders "from various walks of Timorese life". Like the PSTT itself, the Popular Assembly is usually characterised as an instrument of propaganda created by the Indonesian military; although international journalists were invited to witness the group's meeting in May 1976, their movement was tightly constrained. The Assembly drafted a request for formal integration into Indonesia, which Jakarta described as "the act of self-determination" in East Timor.

Indonesia kept East Timor shut off from the rest of the world, except for a few years in the late 1980s and early 1990s, claiming that the vast majority of East Timorese supported integration. This position was followed closely by the Indonesian media such that an East Timorese acceptance of their integration with Indonesia was taken for granted by, and was a non-issue for, the majority of Indonesians. East Timor came to be seen as a training ground for the officer corps in tactics of suppression for Aceh and Irian Jaya and was pivotal in ensuring military sector dominance of Indonesia.

=== Indonesian campaigns against the resistance ===
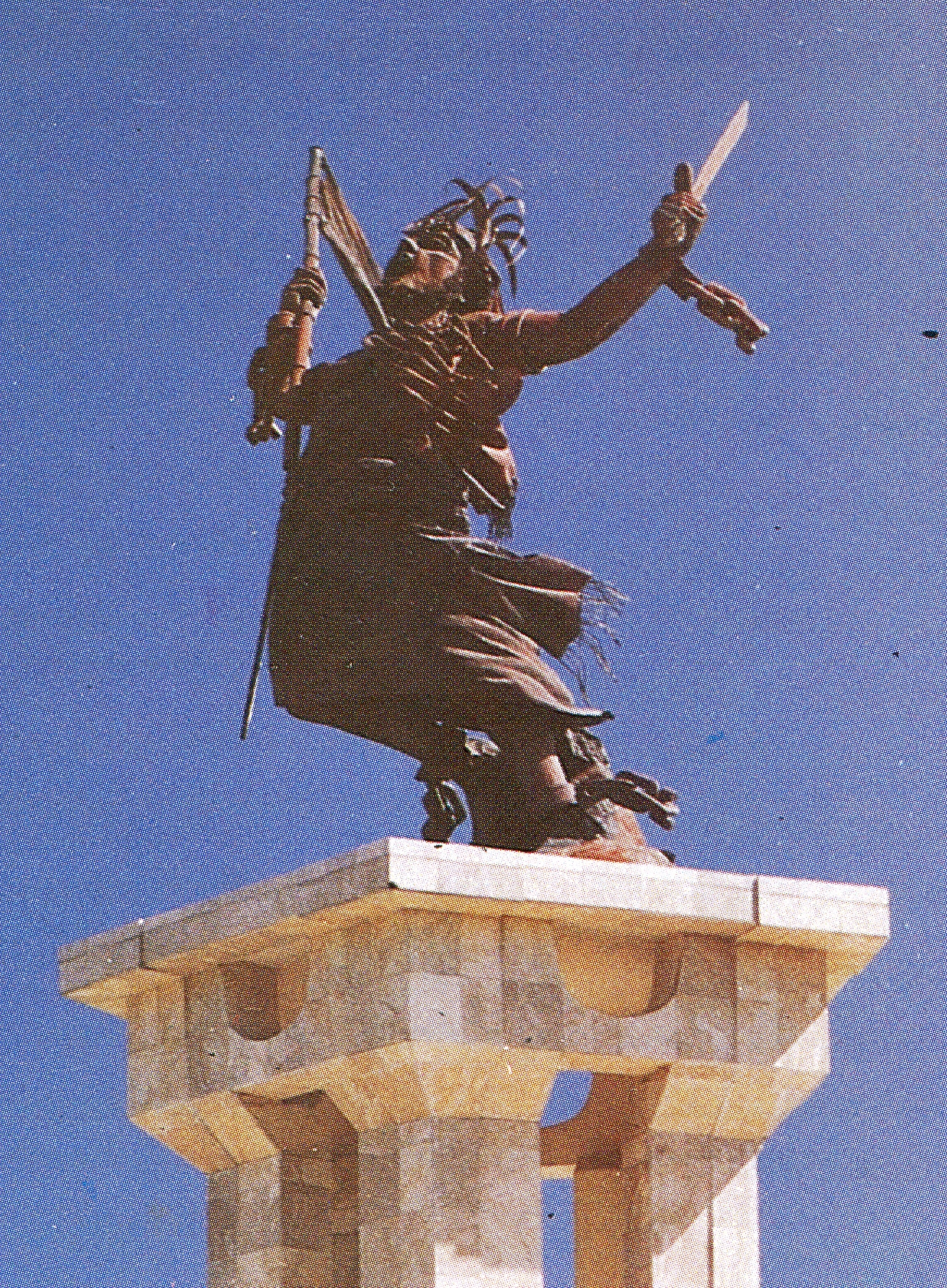
The integration monument in Dili was donated by the Indonesian government to represent emancipation from colonialism

Leaders of Indonesian intelligence influential with Suharto had initially envisaged that invasion, subdual of Fretilin resistance, and integration with Indonesia would be quick and relatively painless. The ensuing Indonesian campaigns up through 1976 were devastating for the East Timorese, an enormous drain on Indonesian resources, were severely damaging to Indonesia internationally, and ultimately a failure. The wanton, wholesale killings by the TNI near the coastal regions during the opening months of the invasion had driven a large portion of the population and most of the remaining Falintil into the central regions. This proved counterproductive as it left Indonesian troops fighting against an enemy which was well equipped and had access to agricultural resources and population. The civilian population came to see the Falintil as a buffer against the excesses of the Indonesian forces, which led to heightened support for the resistance. From 1975 to 1977, the Fretilin protected at least 40% of the population who had fled the coastal regions, in inhospitable conditions, with the active support of rallied communities. Schwarz suggests the fact that the Indonesian military's power base remained barely dented by the mid-1970s intelligence miscalculations and ongoing failures was a measure of the military's dominance of Indonesian affairs.

By the end of 1976, a stalemate existed between the Falintil and the Indonesian army. Unable to overcome massive resistance and drained of its resources, the TNI began rearming. The Indonesian navy ordered missile-firing patrol-boats from the United States, Australia, the Netherlands, South Korea, and Taiwan, as well as submarines from West Germany. In February 1977, Indonesia also received thirteen OV-10 Bronco aircraft from the Rockwell International Corporation with the aid of an official US government foreign military aid sales credit. The Bronco was ideal for the East Timor invasion, as it was specially designed for counter-insurgency operations in steep terrain. By the beginning of February 1977, at least six of the 13 Broncos were operating in East Timor and helped the Indonesian military pinpoint Fretilin positions. The OV-10 Broncos dealt a heavy blow to the Falintil when the aircraft attacked their forces with conventional weapons and Soviet-supplied Napalm known as 'Opalm.' Along with the new weaponry, an additional 10,000 troops were sent in to begin new campaigns that would become known as the 'final solution'.

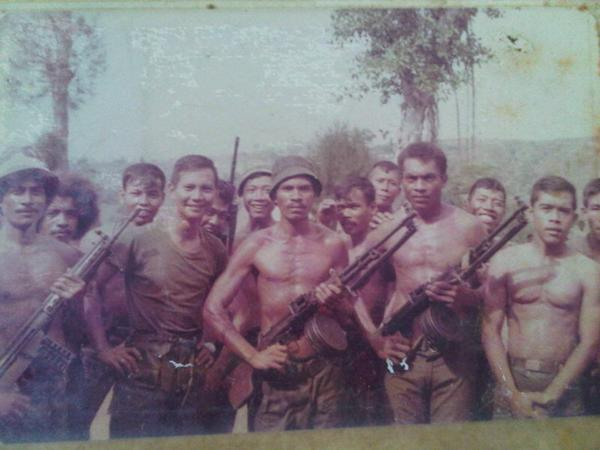
Indonesian Army's Nanggala commando unit in East Timor led by Prabowo Subianto

TNI strategists implemented a strategy of attrition against the Falintil beginning in September 1977. This was accomplished by rendering the central regions of East Timor unable to sustain human life through napalm attacks, chemical warfare and destruction of crops. This was to be done in order to force the population to surrender into the custody of Indonesian forces and deprive the Falintil of food and population. Catholic officials in East Timor called this strategy an "encirclement and annihilation" campaign. 35,000 ABRI troops surrounded areas of Fretilin support and killed men, women, and children. Air and naval bombardments were followed by ground troops, who destroyed villages and agricultural infrastructure. Thousands of people may have been killed during this period. In early 1978, the entire civilian population of Arsaibai village, near the Indonesian border, was killed for supporting Fretilin after being bombarded and starved. The success of the 'encirclement and annihilation' campaign led to the 'final cleansing campaign', in which children and men would be forced to hold hands and march in front of Indonesian units searching for Fretilin members. When Fretilin members were found, the members would be forced to surrender or to fire on their own people.

During this period, allegations of Indonesian use of chemical weapons arose, as villagers reported maggots appearing on crops after bombing attacks. Fretilin radio claimed Indonesian planes dropped chemical agents, and several observers—including the Bishop of Dili—reported seeing napalm dropped on the countryside. The UN's Commission for Reception, Truth and Reconciliation in East Timor, based on interviews with over 8,000 witnesses, as well as Indonesian military papers and intelligence from international sources, confirmed that the Indonesians used chemical weapons and napalm to poison food and water supplies in Fretilin controlled areas during the "encirclement and annihilation" campaign.

While brutal, the Indonesian 'encirclement and annihilation' campaign of 1977–1978 was effective in that it broke the back of the main Fretilin militia. The capable Timorese president and military commander, Nicolau Lobato, was shot and killed by helicopter-borne Indonesian troops on 31 December 1978.

=== Resettlement and enforced starvation ===
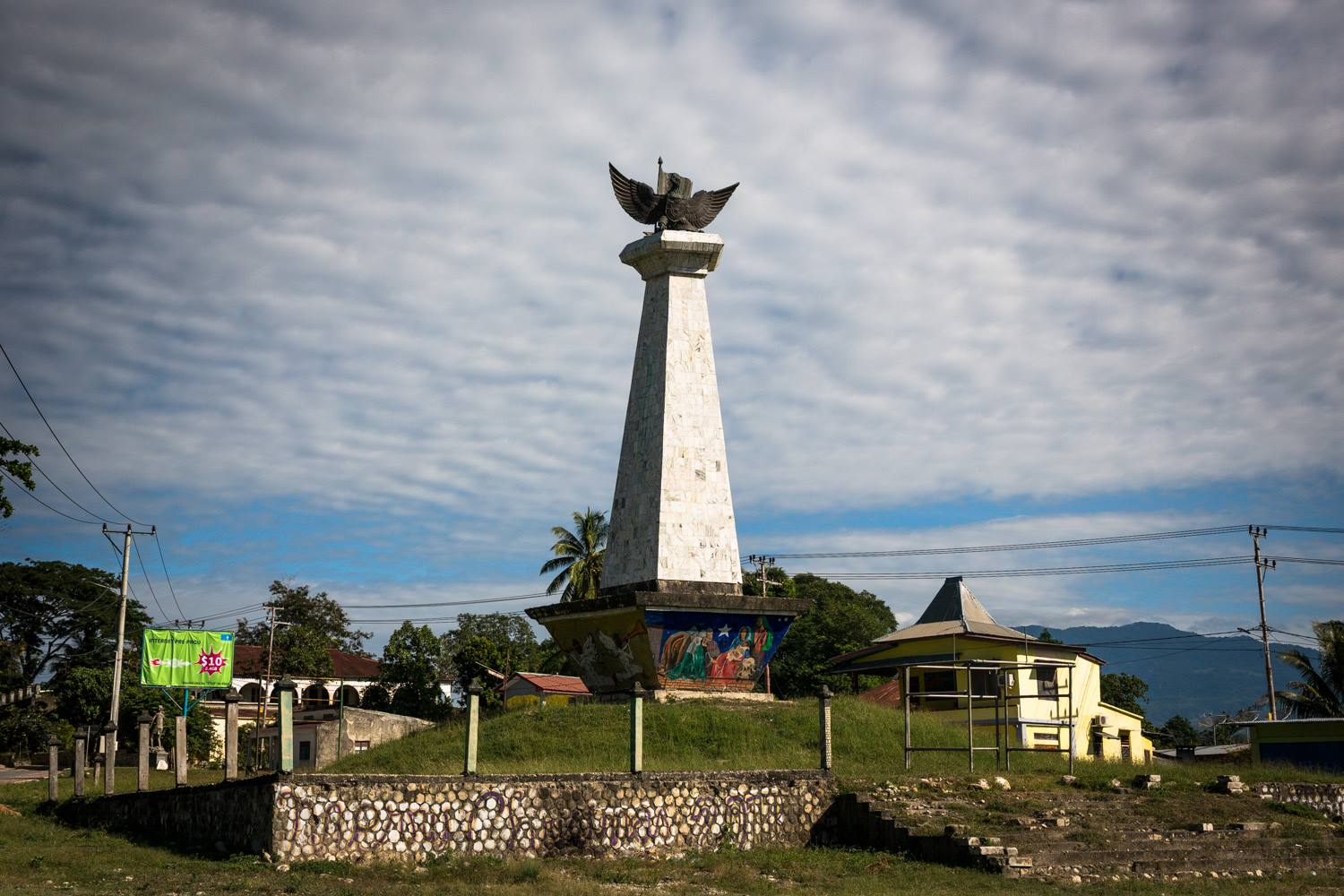
Monument with the National emblem of Indonesia in Viqueque (2016)

As a result of the destruction of food crops, many civilians were forced to leave the hills and surrender to the TNI. Often, when surviving villagers came down to lower-lying regions to surrender, the military would execute them. Those who were not killed outright by TNI troops were sent to receiving centres for vetting, which had been prepared in advance in the vicinity of local TNI bases. In these transit camps, the surrendered civilians were registered and interrogated. Those who were suspected of being members of the resistance were killed.

These centres were often constructed of thatch huts with no toilets. Additionally, the Indonesian military barred the Red Cross from distributing humanitarian aid, and no medical care was provided to the detainees. As a result, many of the Timorese – weakened by starvation and surviving on small rations given by their captors – died of malnutrition, cholera, diarrhoea and tuberculosis. By late 1979, between 300,000 and 370,000 Timorese had passed through these camps. After three months, the detainees were resettled in "strategic hamlets" where they were imprisoned and subjected to enforced starvation. Those in the camps were prevented from travelling and cultivating farmland and were subjected to a curfew. The UN truth commission report confirmed the Indonesian military's use of enforced starvation as a weapon to exterminate the East Timorese civilian population, and that large numbers of people were "positively denied access to food and its sources". The report cited testimony from individuals who were denied food and detailed destruction of crops and livestock by Indonesian soldiers. It concluded that this policy of deliberate starvation resulted in the deaths of 84,200 to 183,000 Timorese. One church worker reported five hundred East Timorese dying of starvation every month in one district.

World Vision Indonesia visited East Timor in October 1978 and claimed that 70,000 East Timorese were at risk of starvation. An envoy from the International Committee of the Red Cross reported in 1979 that 80% of one camp's population was malnourished, in a situation that was "as bad as Biafra". The ICRC warned that "tens of thousands" were at risk of starvation. Indonesia announced that it was working through the government-run Indonesian Red Cross to alleviate the crisis, but the NGO Action for World Development charged that organisation with selling donated aid supplies.

=== Sexual slavery and systematic violence against women ===
Known Indonesian abuses against women in East Timor were numerous and well-documented, though the true scope of the problem is difficult to ascertain, owing to the tight military control imposed during the occupation, compounded by the shame felt by victims. In a 1995 report on violence against women in Indonesia and East Timor, Amnesty International USA wrote: "Women are reluctant to pass on information to non-governmental organizations about rape and sexual abuse, let alone to report violations to the military or police authorities."

Sexual slavery was institutionally tolerated and supported by the TNI and women could be summoned for sexual abuse by TNI soldiers. According to credible investigations, the TNI kept files designating East Timorese women who were to be made available for rape and sexual abuse by Indonesian soldiers. These lists could be passed on between military battalions, which predisposed women to recurring sexual victimisation. Enforced marriage was also a component of TNI policy in East Timor. The Amnesty report cites the case of a woman forced to live with a commander in Baucau, then harassed daily by troops after her release. Such "marriages" took place regularly during the occupation.

Women in areas under Indonesian control were also coerced into accepting sterilisation procedures, and some were pressured or forced outright to take the contraceptive Depo Provera. Village leaders were often urged to cooperate with TNI policy, and local clinics responsible for administering contraceptive injections were established under the control of the TNI in the countryside. In one case specifically, a group of high-school girls were injected with the contraceptive without their knowledge. Other forms of birth control consisted of killing newborn children of women who were suspected of being associated with the Fretilin.

In addition to suffering systematic sexual slavery, forced sterilisation, enforced marriage, torture, and extrajudicial execution, women also faced rape and sexual abuse during interrogation by Indonesian authorities. These women included the wives of resistance members, resistance activists and suspected Fretilin collaborators. Often, women were targeted and subjected to torture as a form of proxy violence when male relatives who were suspected of being Fretilin were not present. In 1999 researcher Rebecca Winters released the book Buibere: Voice of East Timorese Women, which chronicles many personal stories of violence and abuse dating to the earliest days of the occupation. One woman tells of being interrogated while stripped half-naked, tortured, molested, and threatened with death. Another describes being chained at the hands and feet, raped repeatedly, and interrogated for weeks. A woman who had prepared food for Fretilin guerrillas was arrested, burned with cigarettes, tortured with electricity, and forced to walk naked past a row of soldiers into a tank filled with urine and faeces.

=== Forced adoption and removal of children ===
During the occupation, approximately 4,000 children were forcibly removed from their families by Indonesian soldiers as well as by state and religious organisations. Although some were well-treated, others were subjected to various forms of abuse, including sexual abuse. Some were converted to Islam. A number of soldiers who kidnapped these children still hold senior positions within the Indonesian military.

=== Operasi Keamanan: 1981–82 ===
In 1981 the Indonesian military launched Operasi Keamanan (Operation Security), which some have named the "fence of legs" program. During this operation, Indonesian forces conscripted 50,000 to 80,000 Timorese men and boys to march through the mountains ahead of advancing TNI troops as human shields to foreclose a Fretilin counterattack. The objective was to sweep the guerrillas into the central part of the region where they could be eradicated. Many of those conscripted into the "fence of legs" died of starvation, exhaustion or were shot by Indonesian forces for allowing guerrillas to slip through. As the "fence" converged on villages, Indonesian forces massacred an unknown number of civilians. At least 400 villagers were massacred in Lacluta by Battalion 744 of the Indonesian Army in September 1981. An eyewitness who testified before the Australian Senate stated that soldiers deliberately killed small children by smashing their heads against a rock. The operation failed to crush the resistance, and widespread resentment toward the occupation grew stronger than ever. As Fretilin troops in the mountains continued their sporadic attacks, Indonesian forces carried out numerous operations to destroy them over the next ten years. In the cities and villages, meanwhile, a non-violent resistance movement began to take shape.

=== 'Operation Clean-Sweep': 1983 ===
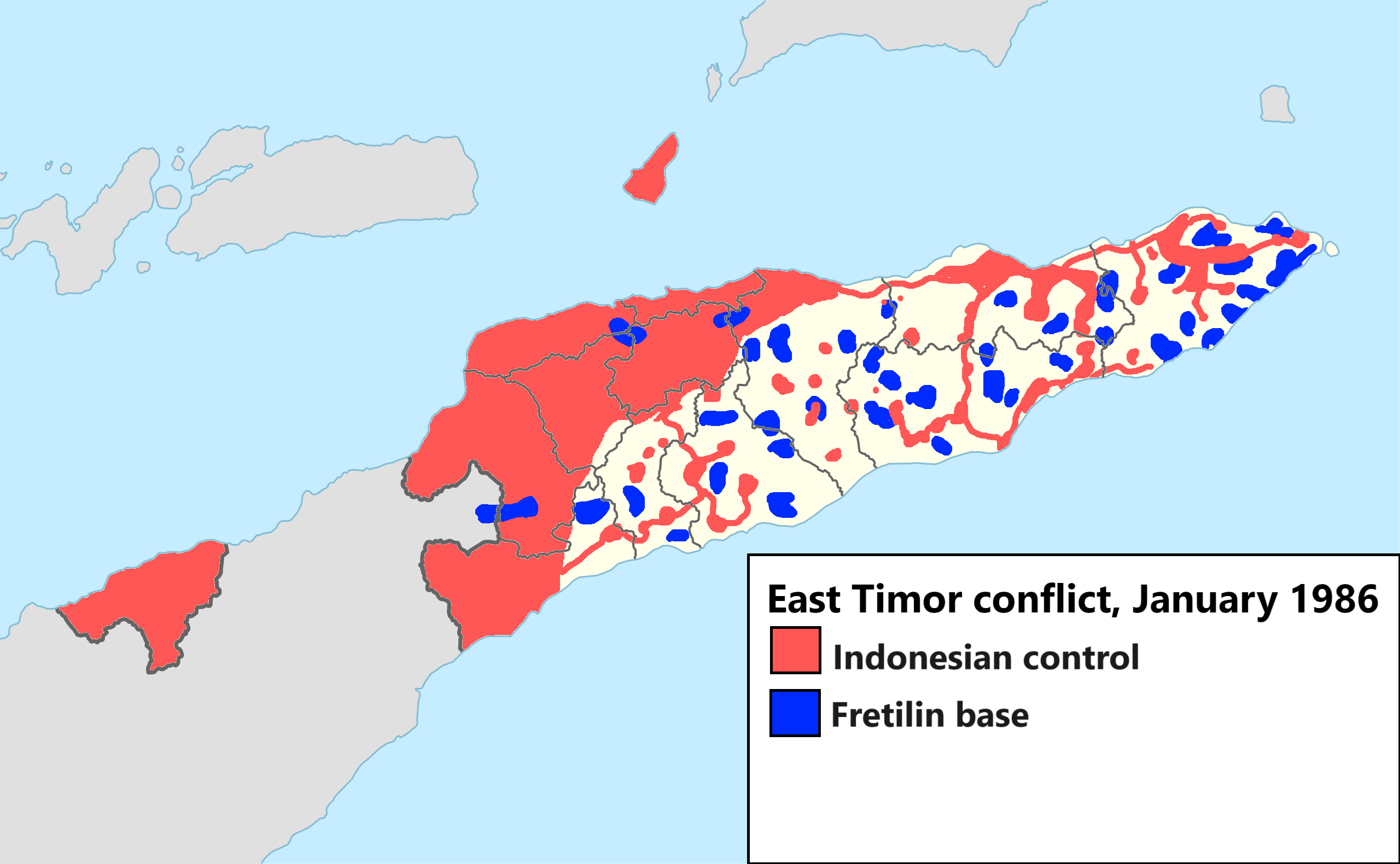
Map of military situation in East Timor in January 1986

The failure of successive Indonesian counterinsurgency campaigns led the Indonesian military elite to instruct the commander of the Dili-based Sub regional Military Resort Command, Colonel Purwanto to initiate peace talks with Fretilin commander Xanana Gusmão in a Fretilin-controlled area in March 1983. When Xanana sought to invoke Portugal and the UN in the negotiations, ABRI Commander Benny Moerdani broke the ceasefire by announcing a new counterinsurgency offensive called "Operational Clean-Sweep" in August 1983, declaring, "This time no fooling around. This time we are going to hit them without mercy."

The breakdown of the ceasefire agreement was followed by a renewed wave of massacres, summary executions and "disappearances" at the hands of Indonesian forces. In August 1983, 200 people were burned alive in the village of Creras, with 500 others killed at a nearby river. Between August and December 1983, Amnesty International documented the arrests and "disappearances" of over 600 people in the capital city alone. Relatives were told by Indonesian forces that the "disappeared" were sent to Bali.

Those suspected of opposing integration were often arrested and tortured. In 1983 Amnesty International published an Indonesian manual it had received from East Timor instructing military personnel on how to inflict physical and mental anguish, and cautioning troops to "Avoid taking photographs showing torture (of someone being given electric shocks, stripped naked and so on)". In his 1997 memoir East Timor's Unfinished Struggle: Inside the Timorese Resistance, Constâncio Pinto describes being tortured by Indonesian soldiers: "With each question, I would get two or three punches in the face. When someone punches you so much and so hard, it feels as if your face is broken. People hit me on my back and on my sides with their hands and then kicked me.... [In another location] they psychologically tortured me; they didn't hit me, but they made strong threats to kill me. They even put a gun on the table." In Michele Turner's book Telling East Timor: Personal Testimonies 1942–1992, a woman named Fátima describes watching torture take place in a Dili prison: "They make people sit on a chair with the front of the chair on their own toes. It is mad, yes. The soldiers urinate in the food then mix it up for the person to eat. They use electric shock and they use an electric machine...."

=== Abuses by Fretilin ===
The Indonesian government reported in 1977 that several mass graves containing "scores" of people killed by Fretilin had been found near Ailieu and Samé. Amnesty International confirmed these reports in 1985, and also expressed concern about several extrajudicial killings for which Fretilin had claimed responsibility. In 1997 Human Rights Watch condemned a series of attacks carried out by Fretilin, which led to the deaths of nine civilians.

=== Demography and economy ===
Indonesian flag of East Timor (Timor Timur)

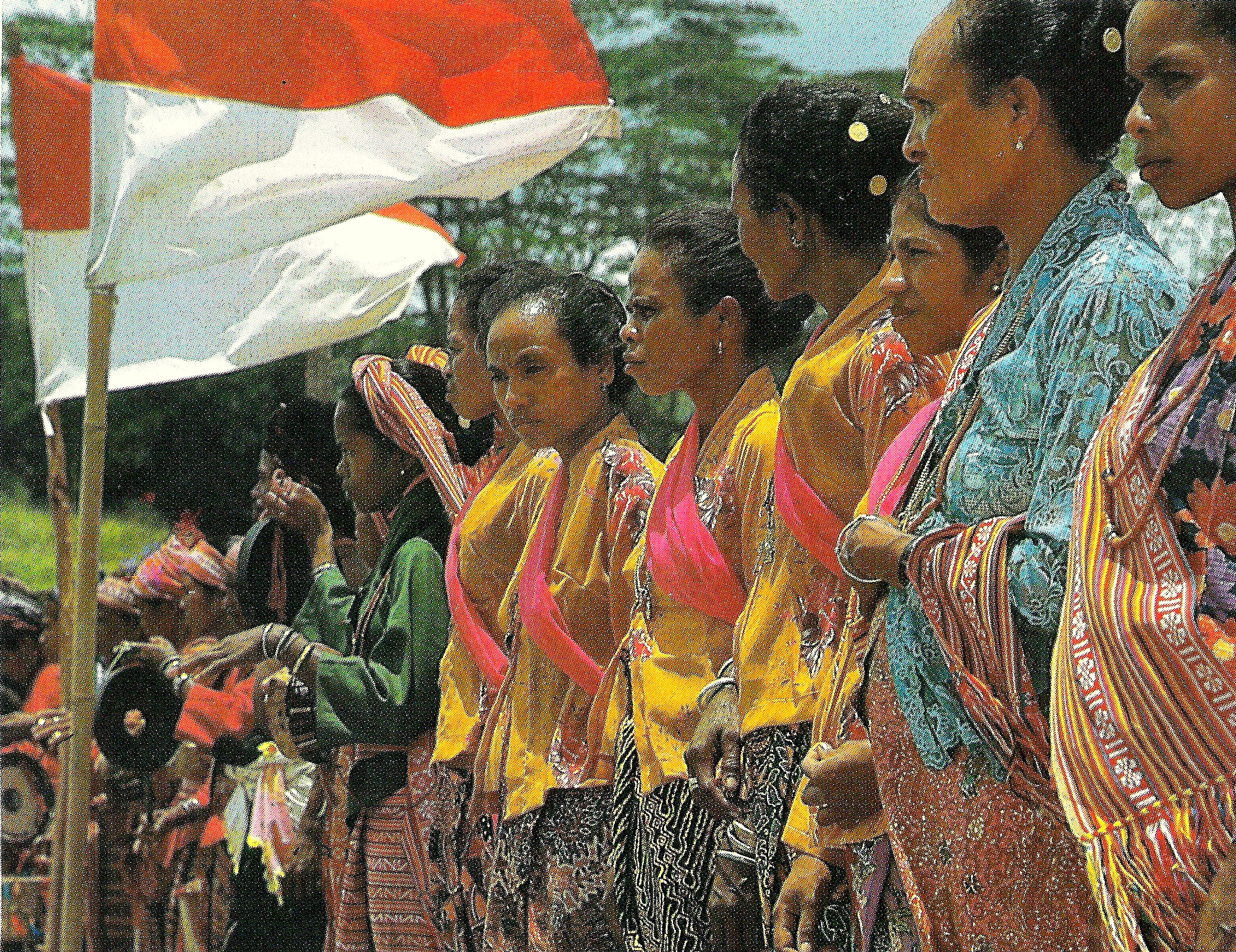
Timorese women with the Indonesian national flag

The Portuguese language was banned in East Timor and Indonesian was made the language of government, education and public commerce, and the Indonesian school curriculum was implemented. The official Indonesian national ideology, Pancasila, was applied to East Timor and government jobs were restricted to those holding certification in Pancasila training. East Timorese animist belief systems did not fit with Indonesia's constitutional monotheism, resulting in mass conversions to Christianity. Portuguese clergy were replaced with Indonesian priests, and Latin and Portuguese mass were replaced by Indonesian mass. Before the invasion, only 20% of East Timorese were Roman Catholics, and by the 1980s, 95% were registered as Catholics. With over 90% Catholic population, East Timor is currently one of the most densely Catholic countries in the world.

East Timor was a particular focus for the Indonesian government's transmigration program, which aimed to resettle Indonesians from densely to less populated regions. Media censorship under the "New Order" meant that the state of conflict in East Timor was unknown to the transmigrants, predominantly poor Javanese and Balinese wet-rice farmers. On arrival, they found themselves under the ongoing threat of attack by East Timorese resistance fighters, and became the object of local resentment, since large tracts of land belonging to East Timorese had been compulsorily appropriated by the Indonesian government for transmigrant settlement. Although many gave up and returned to their island of origin, those migrants that stayed in East Timor contributed to the "Indonesianisation" of East Timor's integration. 662 transmigrant families (2,208 people) settled in East Timor in 1993, whereas an estimated 150,000 free Indonesian settlers lived in East Timor by the mid-1990s, including those offered jobs in education and administration. Migration increased resentment among Timorese who were overtaken by more business savvy immigrants.

Following the invasion, Portuguese commercial interests were taken over by Indonesians. The border with West Timor was opened, resulting in an influx of West Timorese farmers, and in January 1989 the territory was open to private investment. Economic life in the towns was subsequently brought under the control of entrepreneurial Bugis, Makassarese, and Butonese immigrants from South Sulawesi, while East Timor products were exported under partnerships between army officials and Indonesian businessmen. Denok, a military-controlled firm, monopolised some of East Timor's most lucrative commercial activities, including sandal wood export, hotels, and the import of consumer products. The group's most profitable business, however, was its monopoly on the export of coffee, which was the territory's most valuable cash crop. Indonesian entrepreneurs came to dominate non-Denok/military enterprises, and local manufactures from the Portuguese period made way for Indonesian imports.

The Indonesian government's primary response to criticism of its policies was to highlight its funding of development in East Timor's health, education, communications, transportation, and agriculture. East Timor, however, remained poor following centuries of Portuguese colonial neglect and Indonesian critic George Aditjondro points out that conflict in the early years of occupation leads to sharp drops in rice and coffee production and livestock populations. Other critics argue that infrastructure development, such as road construction, is often designed to facilitate Indonesian military and corporate interests. While the military controlled key businesses, private investors, both Indonesian and international, avoided the territory. Despite improvements since 1976, a 1993 Indonesian government report estimated that in three-quarters of East Timor's 61 districts, more than half lived in poverty.

== 1990s ==
=== Changing resistance and integration campaigns ===
Major investment by the Indonesian government to improve East Timor's infrastructure, health and education facilities since 1975 did not end East Timorese resistance to Indonesian rule. Although by the 1980s Fretilin forces had dropped to a few hundred armed men, Fretilin increased its contacts with young Timorese especially in Dili, and an unarmed civil resistance seeking self-determination took shape. Many of those in the protest movements were young children at the time of the invasion and had been educated under the Indonesian system. They resented the repression and replacement of Timorese cultural and political life, were ambivalent of Indonesian economic development, and spoke Portuguese among themselves, stressing their Portuguese heritage. Seeking help from Portugal for self-determination, they considered Indonesia an occupying force. Abroad, Fretilin's members—most notably former journalist José Ramos-Horta (later to be prime minister and president)—pushed their cause in diplomatic forums.

The reduced armed resistance prompted the Indonesian government in 1988 to open up East Timor to improve its commercial prospects, including a lifting of the travel ban on journalists. The new policy came from foreign minister Ali Alatas. Alatas and other diplomats swayed Suharto in favour of the policy as a response to international concerns despite concerns among the military leadership that it would lead to a loss of control. In late 1989, hardline military commander Brigadier General Mulyadi was replaced by Brigadier General Rudolph Warouw who promised a more "persuasive" approach to anti-integrationists. Restrictions on travel within the territory were reduced, groups of political prisoners were released, and the use of torture in interrogation became less frequent. Warouw attempted to increase military discipline; in February 1990 an Indonesian soldier was prosecuted for unlawful conduct in East Timor, the first such action since the invasion.

The reduced fear of persecution encouraged the resistance movements; anti-integration protests accompanied high-profile visits to East Timor, including that of Pope John Paul II in 1989. Additionally, the end of the Cold War removed much of the justification for western support of Indonesia's occupation. The resulting increase in international attention to self-determination and human rights put further pressure on Indonesia. Subsequent events within East Timor in the 1990s helped to dramatically raise the international profile of East Timor, which in turn significantly boosted the momentum of the resistance groups.

=== Santa Cruz massacre ===
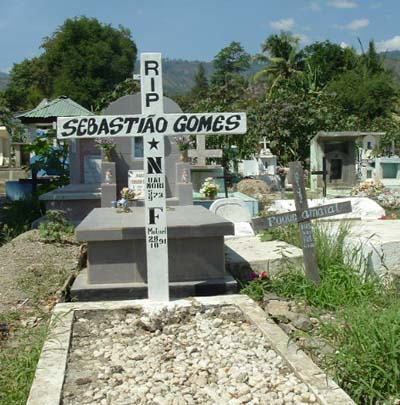
The Santa Cruz massacre took place during a 1991 funeral procession to the grave of Sebastião Gomes.

During a memorial mass on 12 November 1991 for a pro-independence youth shot by Indonesian troops, demonstrators among the 2,500-strong crowd unfurled the Fretilin flag and banners with pro-independence slogans and chanted boisterously but peacefully. Following a brief confrontation between Indonesian troops and protesters, 200 Indonesian soldiers opened fire on the crowd killing at least 250 Timorese.

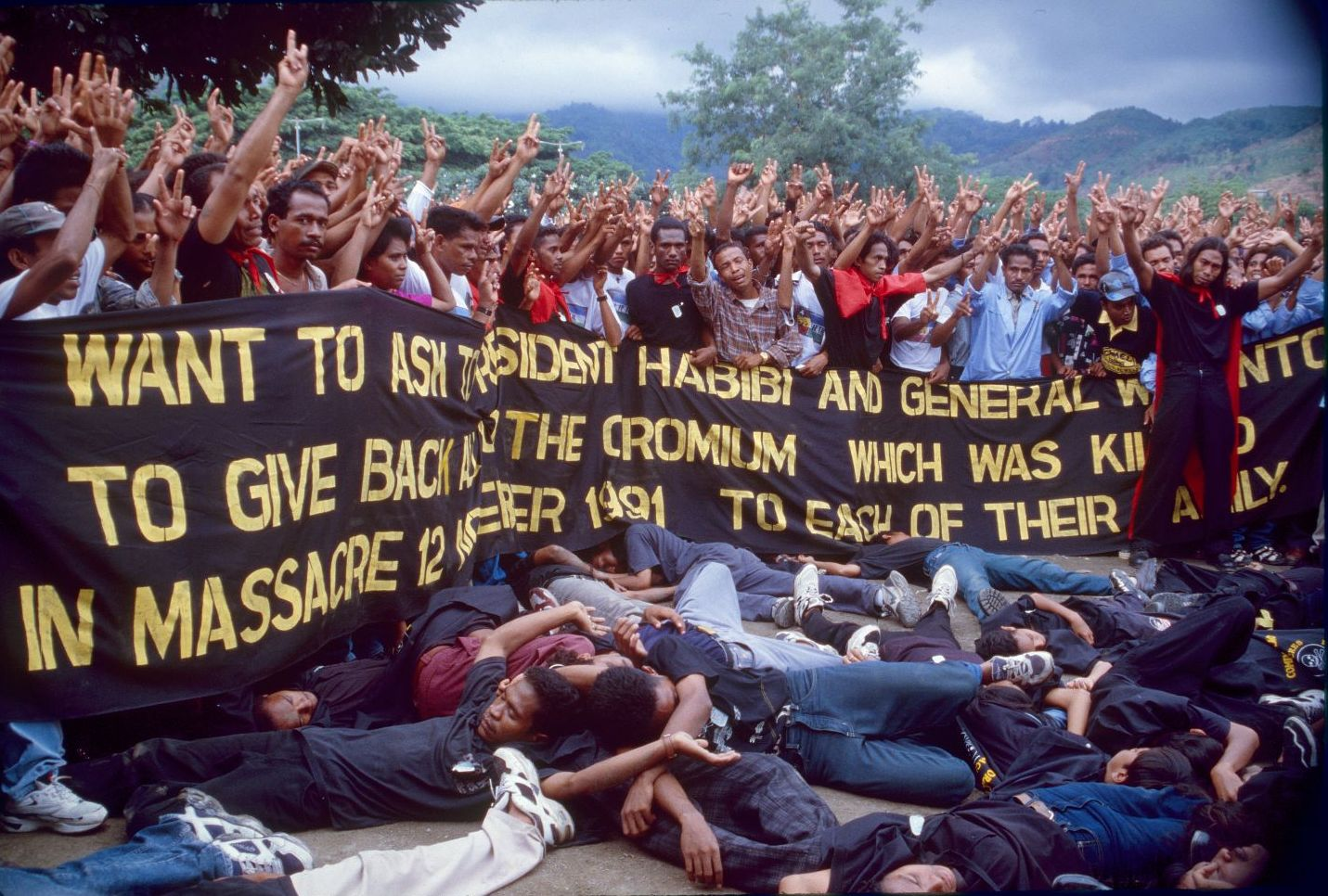
A re-enactment of the Santa Cruz massacre

The testimonies of foreigners at the cemetery were quickly reported to international news organisations, and video footage of the massacre was widely broadcast internationally, causing outrage. In response to the massacre, activists around the world organised in solidarity with the East Timorese, and a new urgency was brought to calls for self-determination. TAPOL, a British organisation formed in 1973 to advocate for democracy in Indonesia, increased its work around East Timor. In the United States, the East Timor Action Network (now the East Timor and Indonesia Action Network) was founded and soon had chapters in ten cities around the country. Other solidarity groups appeared in Portugal, Australia, Japan, Germany, Malaysia, Ireland, and Brazil. Coverage of the massacre was a vivid example of how the growth of new media in Indonesia was making it increasingly difficult for the "New Order" to control information flow in and out of Indonesia, and that in the post-Cold War 1990s, the government was coming under increasing international scrutiny. Several pro-democracy student groups and their magazines began to openly and critically discuss not just East Timor, but also the "New Order" and the broader history and future of Indonesia.

Sharp condemnation of the military came not just from the international community, but from within parts of the Indonesian elite. The massacre ended the government's 1989 opening of the territory and a new period of repression began. Warouw was removed from his position and his more accommodating approach to Timorese resistance rebuked by his superiors. Suspected Fretilin sympathisers were arrested, human rights abuses rose, and the ban on foreign journalists was reimposed. Hatred intensified among Timorese of the Indonesian military presence. Major General Prabowo's, Kopassus Group 3 trained militias gangs dressed in black hoods to crush the remaining resistance.

=== Arrest of Xanana Gusmão ===
On 20 November 1992, Fretilin leader Xanana Gusmão was arrested by Indonesian troops. In May 1993 he was sentenced to life imprisonment for "rebellion", but his sentence was later commuted to 20 years. The arrest of the universally acknowledged leader of the resistance was a major frustration to the anti-integration movement in East Timor, but Gusmão continued to serve as a symbol of hope from inside the Cipinang prison. Nonviolent resistance by East Timorese, meanwhile, continued to show itself. When President Bill Clinton visited Jakarta in 1994, twenty-nine East Timorese students occupied the US embassy to protest US support for Indonesia.

At the same time, human rights observers called attention to continued violations by Indonesian troops and police. A 1995 report by Human Rights Watch noted that "abuses in the territory continue to mount", including torture, disappearances, and limitations on fundamental rights. After a series of riots in September and October 1995, Amnesty International criticised Indonesian authorities for a wave of arbitrary arrests and torture. The report indicates detainees were beaten with iron bars, kicked, lacerated, and threatened with death.

=== Nobel Peace Prize ===
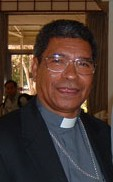
Carlos Filipe Ximenes Belo

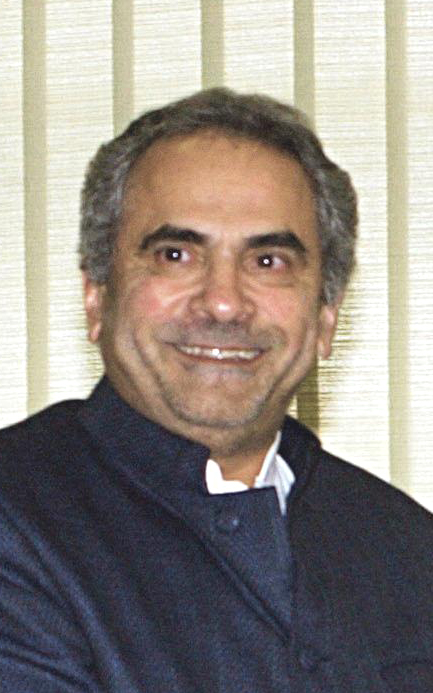
José Ramos-Horta

In 1996 East Timor was suddenly brought to world attention when the Nobel Peace Prize was awarded to Bishop Carlos Filipe Ximenes Belo and José Ramos-Horta "for their work towards a just and peaceful solution to the conflict in East Timor". The Nobel Committee indicated in its press release that it hoped the award would "spur efforts to find a diplomatic solution to the conflict in East Timor based on the people's right to self-determination". As Nobel scholar Irwin Abrams notes:

For Indonesia the prize was a great embarrassment.... In public statements the government tried to put distance between the two laureates, grudgingly recognising the prize for Bishop Belo, over whom it thought it could exercise some control, but accusing Ramos-Horta of responsibility for atrocities during the civil strife in East Timor and declaring that he was a political opportunist. At the award ceremony Chairman Sejersted answered these charges, pointing out that during the civil conflict Ramos-Horta was not even in the country and on his return he tried to reconcile the two parties.

Diplomats from Indonesia and Portugal, meanwhile, continued the consultations required by the 1982 General Assembly resolution, in a series of meetings intended to resolve the problem of what Foreign Minister Ali Alatas called the "pebble in the Indonesian shoe".

== End of Indonesian control ==
Renewed United Nations-brokered mediation efforts between Indonesia and Portugal began in early 1997.

=== Transition in Indonesia ===
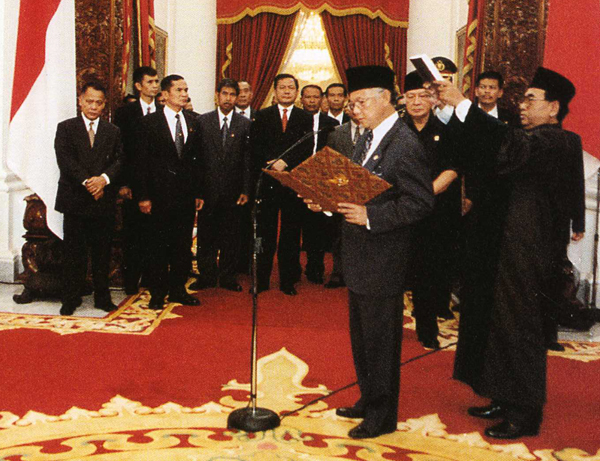
Indonesian president BJ Habibie takes the presidential oath of office on 21 May 1998.

Independence for East Timor, or even limited regional autonomy, was never going to be allowed under Suharto's New Order. Notwithstanding Indonesian public opinion in the 1990s occasionally showing begrudging appreciation of the Timorese position, it was widely feared that an independent East Timor would destabilise Indonesian unity. The 1997 Asian financial crisis, however, caused tremendous upheaval in Indonesia and led to Suharto's resignation in May 1998, ending his thirty-year presidency. Prabowo, by then in command of the powerful Indonesian Strategic Reserve, went into exile in Jordan and military operations in East Timor were costing the bankrupt Indonesian government a million dollars a day. The subsequent "reformasi" period of relative political openness and transition, included an unprecedented debate about Indonesia's relationship with East Timor. For the remainder of 1998, discussion forums took place throughout Dili working towards a referendum. Foreign Minister Alatas, described plans for phased autonomy leading to possible independence as "all pain, no gain" for Indonesia. On 8 June 1998, three weeks after taking office, Suharto's successor B. J. Habibie announced that Indonesia would soon offer East Timor a special plan for autonomy.

In late July 1,300 Indonesian soldiers were withdrawn from East Timor on landing craft in a publicised event but returned on a beach called Com days later, in an attempt to surprise Falintil. Although word spread through East Timor quickly of the soldiers return. ‘A Dirty Little War’ by John Martinkus

In late 1998, the Australian government of John Howard drafted a letter to Indonesia advising of a change in Australian policy and advocating for the staging of a referendum on independence within a decade. President Habibie saw such an arrangement as implying "colonial rule" by Indonesia, and he decided to call a snap referendum on the issue.

Indonesia and Portugal announced on 5 May 1999 that it had agreed to hold a vote allowing the people of East Timor to choose between the autonomy plan or independence. The vote, to be administered by the United Nations Mission in East Timor (UNAMET), was initially scheduled for 8 August but later postponed until 30 August. Indonesia also took responsibility for security; this arrangement caused worry in East Timor, but many observers believe that Indonesia would have refused to allow foreign peacekeepers during the vote.

=== 1999 referendum ===
As groups supporting autonomy and independence began campaigning, a series of pro-integration paramilitary groups of East Timorese began threatening violence—and indeed committing violence—around the country. Alleging pro-independence bias on the part of UNAMET, the groups were seen working with and receiving training from Indonesian soldiers. Before the May agreement was announced, an April paramilitary attack in Liquiça left dozens of East Timorese dead. On 16 May 1999, a gang accompanied by Indonesian troops attacked suspected independence activists in the village of Atara; in June another group attacked a UNAMET office in Maliana. Indonesian authorities claimed to be helpless to stop the violence between rival factions among the East Timorese, but Ramos-Horta joined many others in scoffing at such notions. In February 1999 he said: "Before [Indonesia] withdraws it wants to wreak major havoc and destabilization, as it has always promised. We have consistently heard that over the years from the Indonesian military in Timor."

As militia leaders warned of a "bloodbath", Indonesian "roving ambassador" Francisco Lopes da Cruz declared: "If people reject autonomy there is the possibility blood will flow in East Timor." One paramilitary announced that a vote for independence would result in a "sea of fire", an expression referring to the Bandung Sea of Fire during Indonesia's own war of independence from the Dutch. As the date of the vote drew near, reports of anti-independence violence continued to accumulate.

The day of the vote, 30 August 1999, was generally calm and orderly. 98.6% of registered voters cast ballots, and on 4 September UN secretary-general Kofi Annan announced that 78.5% of the votes had been cast for independence. Brought up on the "New Order"'s insistence that the East Timorese supported integration, Indonesians were either shocked by or disbelieved that the East Timorese had voted against being part of Indonesia. Many people accepted media stories blaming the supervising United Nations and Australia who had pressured Habibie for a resolution.

Within hours of the results, paramilitary groups had begun attacking people and setting fires around the capital Dili. Foreign journalists and election observers fled, and tens of thousands of East Timorese took to the mountains. Islamic gangs attacked Dili's Catholic diocese building, killing two dozen people; the next day, the headquarters of the ICRC was attacked and burned to the ground. Almost one hundred people were killed later in Suai, and reports of similar massacres poured in from around East Timor. The UN withdrew most of its personnel, but the Dili compound had been flooded with refugees. Four UN workers refused to evacuate unless the refugees were withdrawn as well, insisting they would rather die at the hands of the paramilitary groups. At the same time, Indonesian troops and paramilitary gangs forced over 200,000 people into West Timor, into camps described by Human Rights Watch as "deplorable conditions".

When a UN delegation arrived in Jakarta on 8 September, they were told by Indonesian president Habibie that reports of bloodshed in East Timor were "fantasies" and "lies". General Wiranto of the Indonesian military insisted that his soldiers had the situation under control, and later expressed his emotion for East Timor by singing the 1975 hit song "Feelings" at an event for military wives.

=== Indonesian withdrawal and peacekeeping force ===
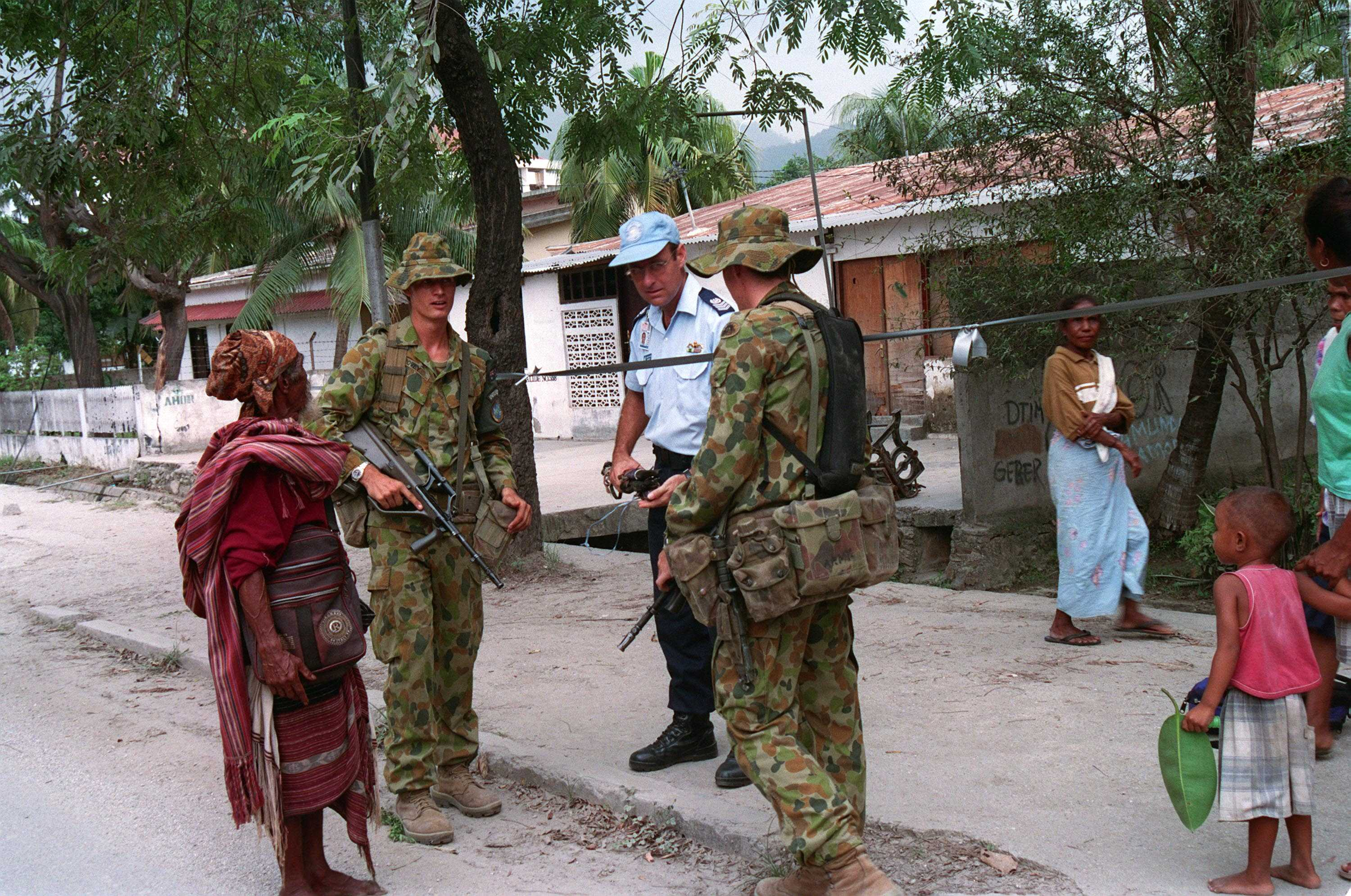
INTERFET troops entered Dili on 20 September, two weeks after pro-Indonesian paramilitary groups began a final wave of violence.

The violence was met with widespread public anger in Australia, Portugal and elsewhere and activists in Portugal, Australia, the United States and other nations pressured their governments to take action. Australian prime minister John Howard consulted United Nations secretary-general Kofi Annan and lobbied US president Bill Clinton to support an Australian led international peacekeeper force to enter East Timor to end the violence. The United States offered crucial logistical and intelligence resources and an "over-horizon" deterrent presence but did not commit forces to the operation. Finally, on 11 September, Clinton announced:

I have made clear that my willingness to support future economic assistance from the international community will depend upon how Indonesia handles the situation from today.

Indonesia, in dire economic straits, relented. President BJ Habibie announced on 12 September that Indonesia would withdraw Indonesian soldiers and allow an Australian-led international peacekeeping force to enter East Timor.

On 15 September 1999, the United Nations Security Council expressed concern at the deteriorating situation in East Timor and issued UNSC Resolution 1264 calling for a multinational force to restore peace and security to East Timor, to protect and support the United Nations mission there, and to facilitate humanitarian assistance operations until such time as a United Nations peacekeeping force could be approved and deployed in the area.

The International Force for East Timor, or INTERFET, under the command of Australian Major General Peter Cosgrove, entered Dili on 20 September and by 31 October the last Indonesian troops had left East Timor. The arrival of thousands of international troops in East Timor caused the militia to flee across the border into Indonesia, whence sporadic cross-border raids by the militia against INTERFET forces were conducted.

The United Nations Transitional Administration in East Timor (UNTAET) was established at the end of October and administered the region for two years. Control of the nation was turned over to the government of East Timor, and independence was declared on 20 May 2002. On 27 September of the same year, East Timor joined the United Nations as its 191st member state.

The bulk of the military forces of INTERFET were Australian—more than 5,500 troops at its peak, including an infantry brigade, with armoured and aviation support—while eventually, 22 nations contributed to the force which at its height numbered over 11,000 troops. The United States provided crucial logistic and diplomatic support throughout the crisis. At the same time, the cruiser USS Mobile Bay protected the INTERFET naval fleet and a US Marine infantry battalion of 1,000 men—plus organic armour and artillery—was also stationed off the coast aboard the USS Belleau Wood to provide a strategic reserve in the event of significant armed opposition.

== International response ==
Indonesia used fear of communism to garner varying degrees of support among western countries, including the United States and Australia, for its East Timor invasion and occupation. The invasion and suppression of East Timor's independence movement caused great harm to Indonesia's reputation and international credibility. Criticism from the developing world undermined efforts in the 1980s to secure the Non-Aligned Movement chair which Suharto strongly desired for Indonesia and condemnation of Indonesia continued through the 1990s.

=== Australia ===
In September 1974, Australian prime minister Gough Whitlam met with Suharto and indicated that he would support Indonesia if it annexed East Timor. On 11 November 1975, the Whitlam government was dismissed. This placed restrictions on the caretaker government of Fraser. Until the results of the 13 December election were known, any action required approval from both political parties and the governor-general. On 4 December 1975 Australia unsuccessfully sought a UN resolution to determine the independence of East Timor, and the Australian government evacuated Australians and other foreign nationals from Dili. José Ramos-Horta arrived in Darwin on 5 December saying that aid agencies the Australian Red Cross and Australian Society for Intercountry Aid Timor (ASIAT) had been banned from East Timor. In the same news conference, Horta said that the Fretilin government in East Timor would not accept any UN assistance that included Australia.

After winning the December elections, the Fraser government took the approach that trade with Southeast Asia and political ties with Southeast Asia were too important to be put at risk for what was seen as a lost cause. Australia abstained from the 1976 and 1977 UN General Assembly Resolutions, and by 1978 became the only country to recognise East Timor officially as a province of Indonesia.

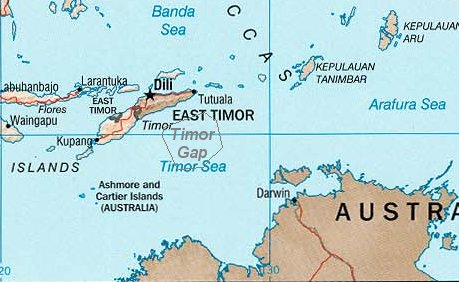
Soon after recognising the annexation of East Timor in 1978, Australia began negotiations with Indonesia to divide resources found in the Timor Gap.

One year later, Australia and Indonesia began drafting a treaty to share resources in the Timor Gap. The treaty was signed in December 1989, with estimates ranging from one to seven billion barrels of oil to be secured. This agreement, along with general economic partnership with Indonesia, is frequently cited as a crucial factor for the Australian government's position. However, given that nearly 60,000 East Timorese had died during the fighting between Australian and Japanese forces that followed the invasion of Timor by the Japanese during the Pacific War, some Australians believed their government owed a special debt to the former Portuguese colony. James Dunn, a senior Foreign Affairs adviser to the Australian Parliament before and during the occupation, condemned the government's position, saying later: "What had been of vital strategic value in 1941 was, in 1974, irrelevant and dispensable." Some Australian World War II veterans protested the occupation for similar reasons.

Successive Australian governments saw good relations and stability in Indonesia (Australia's largest neighbour) as providing an important security buffer to Australia's north, but the East Timor issue complicated co-operation between the two nations. Australia provided important sanctuary to East Timorese independence advocates like José Ramos-Horta, who based himself in Australia during his exile. Australia's trade with Indonesia grew through the 1980s, and the Keating Labor government signed a security pact with Indonesia in 1995 and gave relations with Jakarta a high priority. The fall of Indonesian president Suharto and a shift in Australian policy by the Howard government in 1998 helped precipitate a proposal for a referendum on the question of independence for East Timor. In late 1998, Prime Minister John Howard and Foreign Minister Alexander Downer drafted a letter to Indonesia setting out a change in Australian policy, suggesting that East Timor be given a chance to vote on independence within a decade. The letter upset Indonesian president B. J. Habibie, who saw it as implying Indonesia was a "colonial power", and he decided to announce a snap referendum. A UN-sponsored referendum held in 1999 showed overwhelming approval for independence but was followed by violent clashes and a security crisis instigated by the anti-independence militia. Australia then led a United Nations-backed International Force for East Timor to end the violence, and order was restored. While the intervention was ultimately successful, Australian-Indonesian relations would take several years to recover.

The Australian Labor Party altered its East Timor policy in 1999 and adopted a policy of support for East Timorese independence and opposition to the Indonesian presence there through its Foreign Affairs spokesperson Laurie Brereton. Breretons' credibility was attacked by the governing Liberal-National Coalition government and its Foreign Affairs Minister Alexander Downer, and Prime Minister Howard. They were assisted in their campaign by the then-Labor-backbencher Kevin Rudd (who would later lead the Labor Party to victory in the 2007 Australian federal election).

=== Philippines ===
Owing to its strong relations with Indonesia, the Philippines initially was cold on the issue. In fact, not only did it deny José Ramos-Horta entry in 1997 when he was supposed to give a lecture at the University of the Philippines Diliman, then President Fidel V. Ramos even included him in the immigration blacklist.

However, with widespread support from various countries, the Philippines finally changed its policy. After Timorese independence, the Philippines contributed medical and logistics personnel to Interfet, rather than ground troops. In 2000, the UN named a Filipino, Lieutenant General Jaime de los Santos, to command the full-fledged UN Interfet.

Sharing the same Roman Catholic heritage, the Philippines became a natural ally and has maintained a good relationship with East Timor since. It has also removed José Ramos-Horta from the blacklist; he frequently gives lectures at various universities in the Philippines, most notably at the University of the Philippines Diliman, Polytechnic University of the Philippines, De La Salle University and Ateneo de Davao University.

=== Portugal ===
The day after the invasion, Portugal cut diplomatic ties with Indonesia and went on to support UN resolutions condemning the invasion. However, in the late 1970s and early 1980s, the Portuguese government appeared reluctant to push the issue; American Indonesia specialist Benedict Anderson suggests this stemmed from uncertainty at the time over its application to the European Community. Portugal's criticism mounted sharply from the mid-1980s, and due to public pressure, the country became one of the highest-profile campaigners in international forums for East Timorese self-determination. Throughout the 1990s, Portugal took part in UN-brokered mediations with Indonesia.

=== United States ===
In 1975, the United States was completing a retreat from Vietnam. A staunchly anti-communist Indonesia was considered by the United States to be an essential counterweight, and friendly relations with the Indonesian government were considered more important than a decolonisation process in East Timor. The United States also wanted to maintain its access to deep water straits running through Indonesia for undetectable submarine passage between the Indian and Pacific oceans.

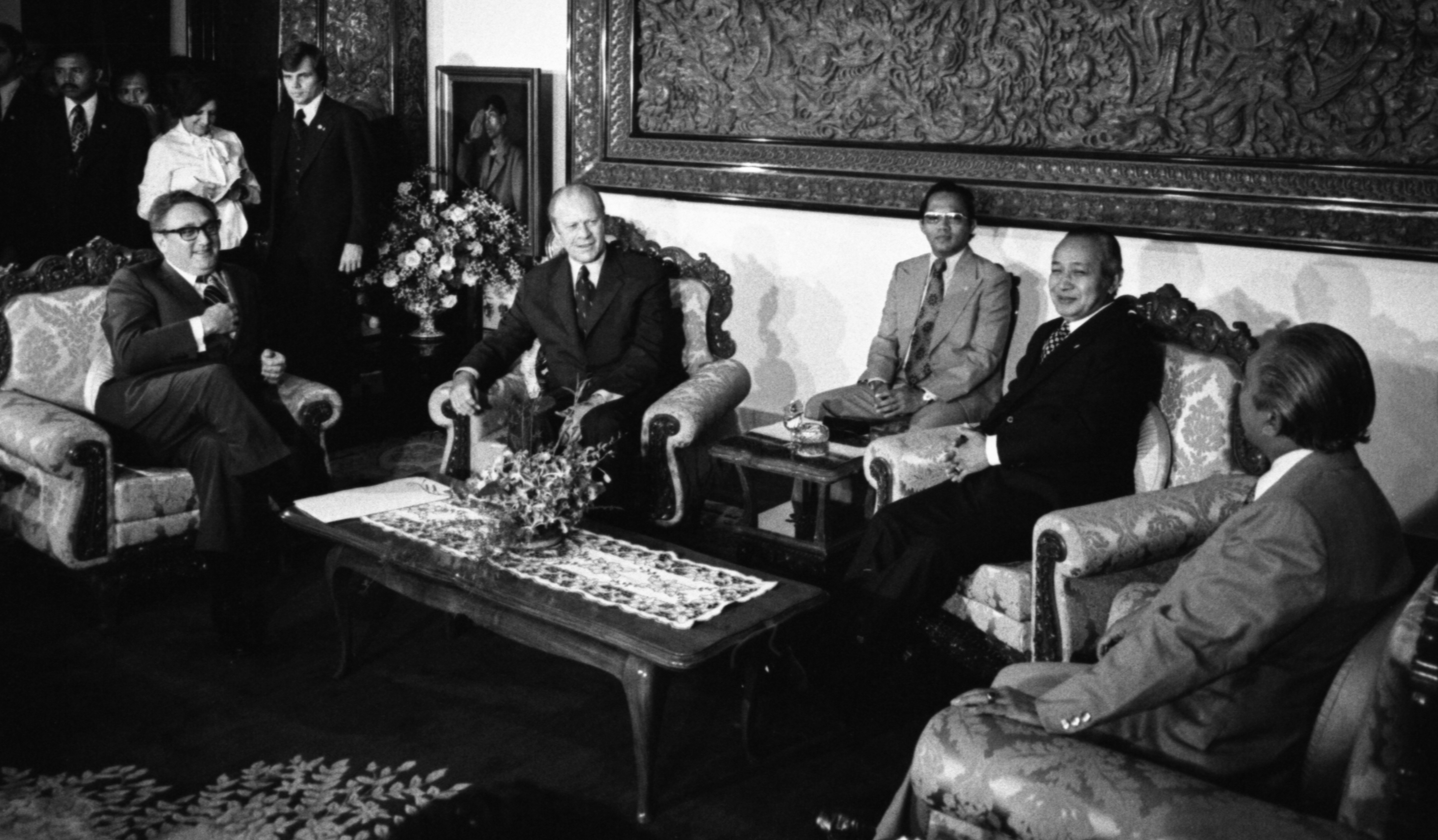
US secretary of state Henry Kissinger and President Gerald Ford discussed East Timor with President Suharto one day before the invasion.

On the day before the invasion, US president Gerald R. Ford and US secretary of state Henry A. Kissinger met with Indonesian president Suharto and reportedly gave their approval for the invasion. In response to Suharto saying "We want your understanding if it was deemed necessary to take rapid or drastic action [in East Timor]." Ford replied, "We will understand and will not press you on the issue. We understand the problem and the intentions you have." Kissinger similarly agreed, though he had fears that the use of U.S.-made arms in the invasion would be exposed to public scrutiny, talking of their desire to "influence the reaction in America" so that "there would be less chance of people talking in an unauthorised way." The US also hoped the invasion would be swift and not involve protracted resistance. "It is important that whatever you do succeeds quickly," Kissinger said to Suharto.

The U.S. supplied weapons to Indonesia during the invasion and the subsequent occupation. A week after the invasion of East Timor, the National Security Council prepared an analysis which found widespread use of US-supplied military equipment. Although the US government said they would delay new arms sales from December 1975 to June 1976 pending a review by the State Department to determine whether Indonesia had violated a bilateral agreement stipulating that Indonesia could only use U.S.-supplied arms for defensive purposes, military aid continued to flow, and Kissinger chastised members of his State Department staff for suggesting arms sales be cut. Kissinger was worried about reactions to his policies from the U.S. public, including the Congress, deploring that "Everything on paper will be used against me". Between 1975 and 1980, when the violence in East Timor was at its climax, the United States furnished approximately $340 million in weaponry to the Indonesian government. US military aid and arms sales to Indonesia increased from 1974 and continued through to the Bush and Clinton years until it was stopped in 1999. US arms provisions to Indonesia between 1975 and 1995 amounted to approximately $1.1 billion. The Clinton administration, under the Pentagon's JCET program, trained the Indonesian Kopassus special forces in urban guerrilla warfare, surveillance, counter-intelligence, sniper tactics and 'psychological operations'.

The UN's Commission for Reception, Truth and Reconciliation in East Timor (CAVR) stated in the "Responsibility" chapter of its final report that US "political and military support were fundamental to the Indonesian invasion and occupation" of East Timor between 1975 and 1999. The report (p. 92) also stated that "U.S. supplied weaponry was crucial to Indonesia's capacity to intensify military operations from 1977 in its massive campaigns to destroy the Resistance in which aircraft supplied by the United States played a crucial role."

Fretilin has claimed that the degree of US support for the Indonesian government's efforts in East Timor may have extended beyond that of diplomatic support and material assistance. A UPI report from Sydney, Australia dated 19 June 1978, quoted a Fretilin press release, which stated: "American military advisers and mercenaries fought alongside Indonesian soldiers against FRETILIN in two battles ... In the meantime, American pilots are flying OV-10 Bronco aircraft for the Indonesian Air Force in bombing raids against the liberated areas under FRETILIN control."

The United States abstained from most of the UN resolutions censuring the Indonesian invasion. Daniel Patrick Moynihan, the US Ambassador to the UN at the time, wrote later in his memoirs: "The Department of State desired that the United Nations prove utterly ineffective in whatever measures it undertook. This task was given to me, and I carried it forward with no inconsiderable success."

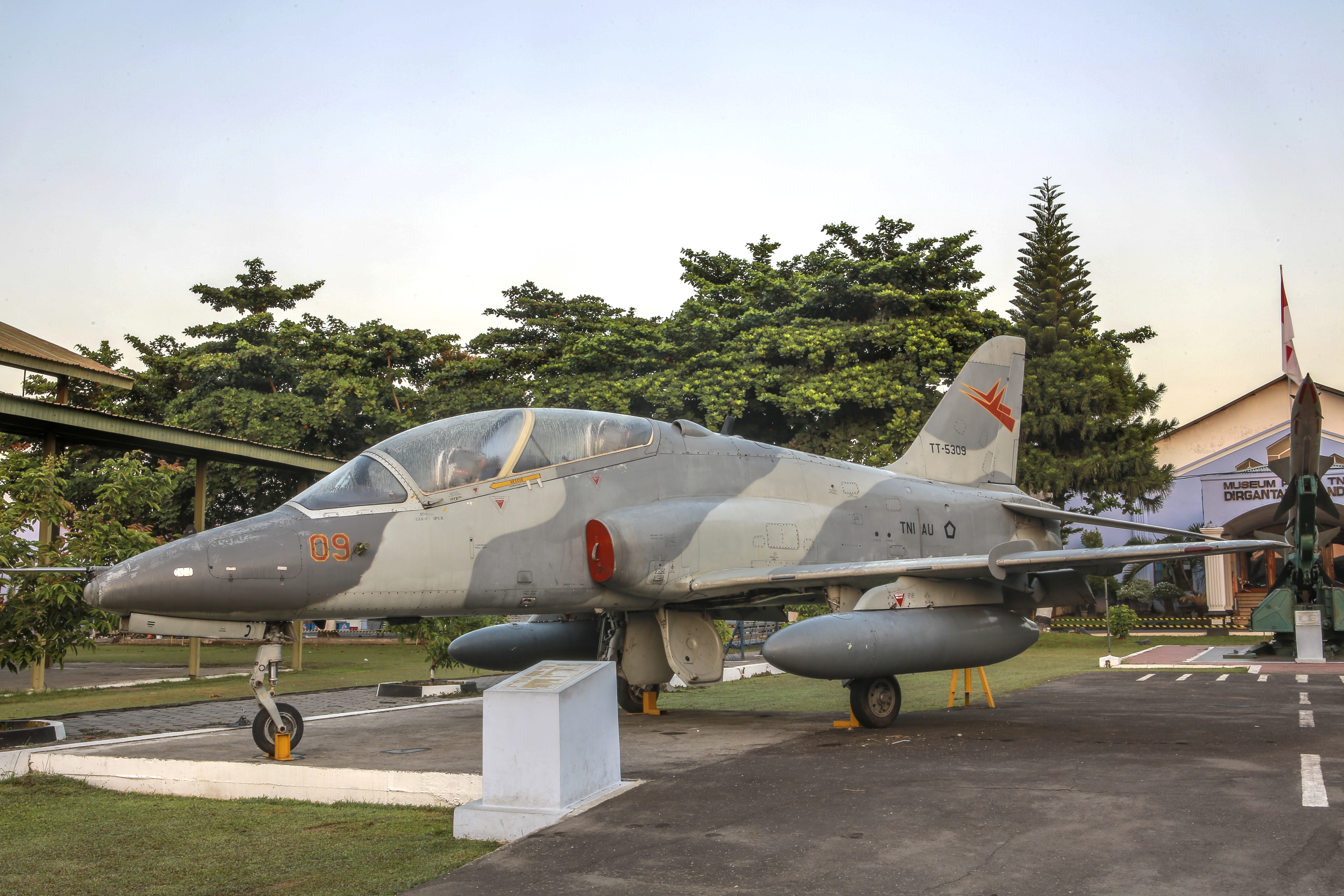
Britain sold dozens of BAE Hawk jets to Indonesia during the occupation, some of which were used in the "encirclement and annihilation" campaign.

=== Other countries ===
Britain, Canada, Japan, and other nations supported Indonesia during the occupation of East Timor. Britain abstained from all of the UN General Assembly resolutions relating to East Timor and sold arms throughout the occupation. In 1978 Indonesia purchased eight BAE Hawk jet trainers, which were used during the "encirclement and annihilation" campaign. Britain sold dozens of additional jets to Indonesia in the 1990s. Canada abstained from early General Assembly resolutions about East Timor and opposed three. The Canadian government regularly sold weapons to Indonesia during the occupation, and in the 1990s approved over C$400 million in exports for spare weapons parts. Japan voted against all eight General Assembly resolutions regarding East Timor.

The Indian government also supported Indonesia, likening the occupation to its own seizure of Goa in 1961. Some analysts remarked that Indonesia's delayed action also prevented a peaceful transfer of East Timor to it, similar to how the French transferred Pondicherry to India in 1962.

Member nations of the Association of Southeast Asian Nations (ASEAN), consistently voted against the General Assembly resolutions calling for self-determination in East Timor.

== Consequences ==
=== Number of deaths ===
Precise estimates of the death toll are difficult to determine. The 2005 report of the UN's Commission for Reception, Truth and Reconciliation in East Timor (CAVR) reports an estimated minimum number of conflict-related deaths of 102,800 (+/- 12,000). Of these, the report says that approximately 18,600 (+/-1,000) were either killed or disappeared and that approximately 84,000 (+/-11,000) died from hunger or illness in excess of what would have been expected due to peacetime mortality. These figures represent a minimum conservative estimate that CAVR says is its scientifically based principal finding. The report did not provide an upper bound. However, CAVR speculated that the total number of deaths due to conflict-related hunger and illness could have been as high as 183,000. The truth commission held Indonesian forces responsible for about 70% of the violent killings.

Researcher Ben Kiernan says that "a toll of 150,000 is likely close to the truth," although one can throw out an estimate of 200,000 or higher. The Center for Defense Information also estimated a total close to 150,000. A 1974 Catholic church estimate of the population of East Timor was 688,711 people; in 1982 the church reported only 425,000. This led to an estimate of 200,000 people killed during the occupation, which was widely reported around the world. Other sources such as Amnesty International and Human Rights Watch also support an estimate of over 200,000 killed.

According to specialist Gabriel Defert based on statistical data available from the Portuguese and Indonesian authorities, and from the Catholic Church, between December 1975 and December 1981, approximately 308,000 Timorese lost their lives; this constituted about 44% of the pre-invasion population. Similarly, Indonesian Professor George Aditjondro, formerly of Salatiga University in Java, concluded from his study of Indonesian Army data that in fact 300,000 Timorese had been killed in the early years of the occupation.

Robert Cribb of the Australian National University argues that the toll was significantly exaggerated. He argues that the 1980 census that counted 555,350 Timorese, although "the most reliable source of all", was probably a minimum rather than a maximum estimate for the total population. "It is worth recalling that hundreds of thousands of East Timorese disappeared during the violence of September 1999, only to reappear later," he writes. The 1980 census becomes more improbable in the face of the 1987 census that counted 657,411 Timorese – this would require a growth rate of 2.5% per year, nearly identical to the very high growth rate in East Timor from 1970 to 1975, and a highly unlikely one given the conditions of the brutal occupation, including Indonesian efforts to discourage reproduction. Noting the relative lack of personal accounts of atrocities or of traumatised Indonesian soldiers, he further adds that East Timor "does not appear—on the basis of news reports and academic accounts—to be a society traumatized by mass death...the circumstance leading up to the Dili massacre of 1991...indicate a society which retained its vigour and indignation in a way which would probably not have been possible if it had been treated as Cambodia was treated under Pol Pot." Even Indonesian military strategy was based on winning the "hearts and minds" of the population, a fact that does not support charges of mass killing.

Kiernan, starting from a base population of 700,000 Timorese in 1975 (based on the 1974 Catholic Church census), calculated an expected 1980 population of 735,000 Timorese (assuming a growth rate of only 1% per year as a result of the occupation). Accepting the 1980 count that Cribb regards as at least 10% (55,000) too low, Kiernan concluded that as many as 180,000 might have died in the war. Cribb argued that the 3% growth rate suggested by the 1974 census was too high, citing the fact that the church had previously postulated a growth rate of 1.8%, which would have produced a figure in line with the Portuguese population estimate of 635,000 for 1974.

Although Cribb maintained that the Portuguese census was almost certainly an underestimate, he believed it to be more likely correct than the church census, since any church attempt to extrapolate the size of the total population "must be seen in light of its incomplete access to society" (less than half of Timorese were Catholic). Assuming a growth rate in line with the other nations of South East Asia, then, would yield a more accurate figure of 680,000 for 1975, and an expected 1980 population of slightly over 775,000 (without accounting for the decline in the birth rate resulting from the Indonesian occupation). The deficit remaining would be almost exactly 200,000. According to Cribb, Indonesian policies restricted the birth rate by up to 50% or more. Thus, around 45,000 of these were not born rather than killed; another 55,000 were "missing" as a result of the Timorese evading the Indonesian authorities who conducted the 1980 census. A variety of factors—the exodus of tens of thousands from their homes to escape FRETILIN in 1974–5; the deaths of thousands in the civil war; the deaths of combatants during the occupation; killings by FRETILIN; and natural disasters—diminish further still the civilian toll attributable to Indonesian forces during this time. Considering all this data, Cribb argues for a much lower toll of 100,000 or less, with an absolute minimum of 60,000, and a mere tenth of the civilian population dying unnaturally, for the years 1975–80.

Kiernan responded, however, by asserting that the influx of migrant workers during the occupation and the increase in the population growth rate typical of a mortality crisis justifies accepting the 1980 census as valid despite the 1987 estimate and that the 1974 church census—though a "possible maximum"—cannot be discounted because the church's lack of access to society might well have resulted in an undercount. He concluded that at least 116,000 combatants and civilians were killed by all sides or died "unnatural" deaths from 1975 to 1980 (if true, this would yield the result that about 15% of the civilian population of East Timor was killed from 1975 to 1980). F. Hiorth separately estimated that 13% (95,000 out of an expected 730,000 when accounting for the reduction in birth rates) of the civilian population died during this period. Kiernan believes that the deficit was most probably around 145,000 when accounting for the reduction in birth rates, or 20% of East Timor's population. The mid-value of the UN report is 146,000 deaths; R.J. Rummel, an analyst of political killings, estimates 150,000.

Many observers have called the Indonesian military action in East Timor an example of genocide. Oxford held an academic consensus calling the event genocide and Yale university teaches it as part of their "Genocide Studies" program. In a study of the word's legal meaning and applicability to the occupation of East Timor, legal scholar Ben Saul concludes that because no group recognised under international law was targeted by the Indonesian authorities, a charge of genocide cannot be applied. However, he also notes: "The conflict in East Timor most accurately qualifies as genocide against a 'political group', or alternatively as 'cultural genocide', yet neither of these concepts is explicitly recognised in international law." The occupation has been compared to the killings of the Khmer Rouge, the Yugoslav wars, and the Rwandan genocide.

Accurate numbers of Indonesian casualties are well-documented. The complete names of around 2,300 Indonesian soldiers and pro-Indonesian militias who died in action as well as from illness and accidents during the entire occupation are engraved into the Seroja Monument located in Armed Forces Headquarters in Cilangkap, East Jakarta.

=== Justice ===
Saul goes on to discuss prosecutions of responsible parties for "crimes against humanity, war crimes, and other gross violations of human rights". In the years after the end of the occupation, several proceedings have been carried out to such an end. The 1999 UN Security Council resolution authorising UNTAET described the history of "systematic, widespread and flagrant violations of international and human rights law" and demanded "that those responsible for such violence be brought to justice". To achieve these ends, UNTAET established a Serious Crimes Unit (SCU), which has attempted to investigate and prosecute individuals responsible for such violence. However, the SCU has been criticised for accomplishing relatively little, presumably because it is funded inadequately, limited in mandate to crimes committed only in 1999, and for other reasons. Indonesian trials purporting to punish those responsible for the violence were described as "manifestly inadequate" by a UN commission.

Deficiencies in these processes have led some organisations to call for an international tribunal to prosecute individuals responsible for killings in East Timor, similar to those established in Yugoslavia and Rwanda. A 2001 editorial by the East Timor NGO La'o Hamutuk said:

An uncountable number of Crimes Against Humanity were committed during the 1975–1999 period in East Timor. Although an international court could not pursue all of them, it ... [would] confirm that the invasion, occupation and destruction of East Timor by Indonesia was a long-standing, systematic, criminal conspiracy, planned and ordered at the highest levels of government. Many of the perpetrators continue to wield authority and influence in East Timor's nearest neighbour. The future of peace, justice and democracy in both East Timor and Indonesia depends on holding the highest-level perpetrators accountable.

In 2005, the Indonesia-Timor Leste Commission of Truth and Friendship was set up with the goal of establishing the truth relating to crimes under the occupation, and healing divisions between the countries. It has received criticism from NGOs and was rejected by the United Nations for offering impunity.

== Indonesian governors of East Timor ==
- President of the Provisional Government:
  - 17 December 1975 – 17 July 1976: Arnaldo dos Reis Araújo
- Governors:
  - 1976 – 1978: Arnaldo dos Reis Araújo
  - 1978 – 1982: Guilherme Maria Gonçalves
  - 18 September 1982 – 18 September 1992: Mário Viegas Carrascalão
  - 18 September 1992 – 25 October 1999: José Abílio Osório Soares

== Depictions in fiction ==
- Balibo, a 2009 Australian film about the Balibo Five, a group of Australian journalists who were captured and killed just prior to the Indonesian invasion of East Timor. The Redundancy of Courage by Timothy Mo, a novel which was short-listed for the Booker Prize, is generally accepted to be about East Timor.

== See also ==
- Timor Timur

== Bibliography ==
- Aarons, Mark; Domm, Robert (1992). East Timor: A Western Made Tragedy. Sydney: Left Book Club. ISBN 1875285105.
- Aditjondro, George. "Prospects for development in East Timor after the capture of Xanana Gusmão". International Law and the Question of East Timor. London: Catholic Institute for International Relations, 1995. ISBN 1-85287-129-6. pp. 50–63.
- Aditjondro, George. "The Silent Suffering of Our Timorese Sisters". Free East Timor: Australia's Culpability in East Timor's Genocide. Random House Milsons Point: Australia Pty Ltd, 1998. ISBN 0-09-183917-3 pp. 243–265.
- Amnesty International. East Timor Violations of Human Rights: Extrajudicial Executions, "Disappearances", Torture and Political Imprisonment, 1975–1984. London: Amnesty International Publications, 1985. ISBN 0-86210-085-2.
- Amnesty International. East Timor: The Santa Cruz Massacre. London: Amnesty International, 1991. OCLC 28061998
- Amnesty International USA. Women in Indonesian & East Timor: Standing Against Repression. New York: Amnesty International USA, 1995. OCLC 34283963
- Budiardjo, Carmel and Liem Soei Liong. The War against East Timor. London: Zed Books Ltd, 1984. ISBN 0-86232-228-6.
- Carey, Peter. "Historical Background". Generations of Resistance. By Steve Cox. London: Cassell, 1995. ISBN 0-304-33252-6. pp. 13–55.
- Chinkin, Christine. "Australia and East Timor in international law". International Law and the Question of East Timor. London: Catholic Institute for International Relations / International Platform of Jurists for East Timor, 1995. ISBN 1-85287-129-6. pp. 269–289.
- Clark, Roger S. "The 'decolonisation' of East Timor and the United Nations norms on self-determination and aggression". International Law and the Question of East Timor. London: Catholic Institute for International Relations / International Platform of Jurists for East Timor, 1995. ISBN 1-85287-129-6. pp. 65–102.
- Comissão de Acolhimento, Verdade e Reconciliação de Timor Leste (CAVR). Chega! The Report of the Commission for Reception, Truth and Reconciliation Archived 22 May 2017 at the Wayback Machine. Dili, East Timor: 2005. Online at East Timor & Indonesia Action Network Archived 19 August 2014 at the Wayback Machine. Retrieved 11 February 2008.
- Dunn, James (1996). Timor: A People Betrayed. Sydney: Australian Broadcasting Corporation. ISBN 0-7333-0537-7.
- Fernandes, Clinton (2011). The Independence of East Timor: Multi-Dimensional Perspectives - Occupation, Resistance, and International Political Activism. The Sussex Library of Asian Studies. Portland, OR: Sussex Academic Press. ISBN 9781845194284.
- Friend, T. (2003). Indonesian Destinies. Harvard University Press. ISBN 0-674-01137-6.
- Horner, David (2001). Making the Australian Defence Force. The Australian Centenary History of Defence. Vol. IV. Melbourne: Oxford University Press. ISBN 0-19-554117-0.
- Hainsworth, Paul and McCloskey, Stephen (eds.) The East Timor Question: The Struggle for Independence from Indonesia. New York: I.B. Tauris Publishers, 2000, ISBN 1-86064-408-2
- Hearman, Vannessa (13 April 2023). "Australian News Photography and Contested Images of Famine in Indonesian-Occupied East Timor". Australian Historical Studies. 54 (3): 530–553. doi:10.1080/1031461X.2023.2189275. hdl:20.500.11937/90743. ISSN 1940-5049. S2CID 258152469.
- Hill, Helen Mary. Fretilin: the origins, ideologies and strategies of a nationalist movement in East Timor. Canberra: Centre for Continuing Education, Australia National University, 1978. OCLC 07747890
- Indonesia. Department of Foreign Affairs. Decolonization in East Timor. Jakarta: Department of Information, Republic of Indonesia, 1977. OCLC 4458152.
- Indonesia. Department of Foreign Affairs and Department of Information. The Province of East Timor: Development in Progress. Jakarta: Department of Information, Republic of Indonesia, 1981.
- Jardine, Matthew. East Timor: Genocide in Paradise. Monroe, ME: Odonian Press, 1999. ISBN 1-878825-22-4.
- Jolliffe, Jill. East Timor: Nationalism and Colonialism. Queensland: University of Queensland Press, 1978. OCLC 4833990
- Kiernan, Ben. "The Demography of Genocide in Southeast Asia: The Death Tolls in Cambodia, 1975–79, and East Timor, 1975–80" Archived 9 February 2021 at the Wayback Machine. Critical Asian Studies. 35:4 (2003), 585–597.
- Kohen, Arnold and John Taylor. An Act of Genocide: Indonesia's Invasion of East Timor. London: TAPOL, 1979. 0-9506751-0-5.
- Krieger, Heike, ed. East Timor and the International Community: Basic Documents. Melbourne: Cambridge University Press, 1997. ISBN 0-521-58134-6.
- Marker, Jamsheed (2003). East Timor: A Memoir of the Negotiations for Independence. North Carolina: McFarlnad & Company, Inc. ISBN 0-7864-1571-1.
- Martin, Ian (2002). Self-Determination In East Timor: The United Nations, The Ballot and International Intervention. International Peace Academy Occasional Paper Series. Boulder: Rienner.
- Nevins, Joseph (2005). A Not-So-Distant Horror: Mass Violence in East Timor. Ithaca, New York: Cornell University Press. ISBN 0-8014-8984-9.
- Ramos-Horta, José. Funu: The Unfinished Saga of East Timor. Lawrenceville, NJ: The Read Sea Press, 1987. ISBN 0-932415-15-6.
- Schwarz, A. (1994). A Nation in Waiting: Indonesia in the 1990s. Westview Press. ISBN 1-86373-635-2.
- Smith, M.G. (2003). Peacekeeping in East Timor: The Path to Independence. International Peace Academy Occasional Paper Series. Boulder: Rienner.
- Tanter, Richard; van Klinken, Gerry; Ball, Desmond, eds. (2006). Masters of Terror: Indonesia's Military and Violence in East Timor. Lanham, MD: Rowman & Littlefield. ISBN 0742538338.
- Taylor, Jean Gelman (2003). Indonesia: Peoples and Histories. New Haven and London: Yale University Press. ISBN 0-300-10518-5.
- Taylor, John G. The Indonesian Occupation of East Timor 1974–1989. London: Catholic Institute for International Relations, 1990. ISBN 1-85287-051-6.
- Taylor, John G. Indonesia's Forgotten War: The Hidden History of East Timor. London: Zed Books Ltd, 1991. ISBN 1-85649-014-9.
- Turner, Michele. Telling East Timor: Personal Testimonies 1942–1992. Sydney: University of New South Wales Press Ltd., 1992.
- Vickers, Adrian (2005). A History of Modern Indonesia. Cambridge University Press. ISBN 0-521-54262-6.
- Wesley-Smith, Rob. "Radio Maubere and Links to East Timor". Free East Timor: Australia's Culpability in East Timor's Genocide. Milsons Point: Random House Australia, 1998. pp. 83–102.
- Winters, Rebecca. Buibere: Voice of East Timorese Women. Darwin: East Timor International Support Center, 1999. ISBN 0-9577329-3-7.
