= Balide Comarca =

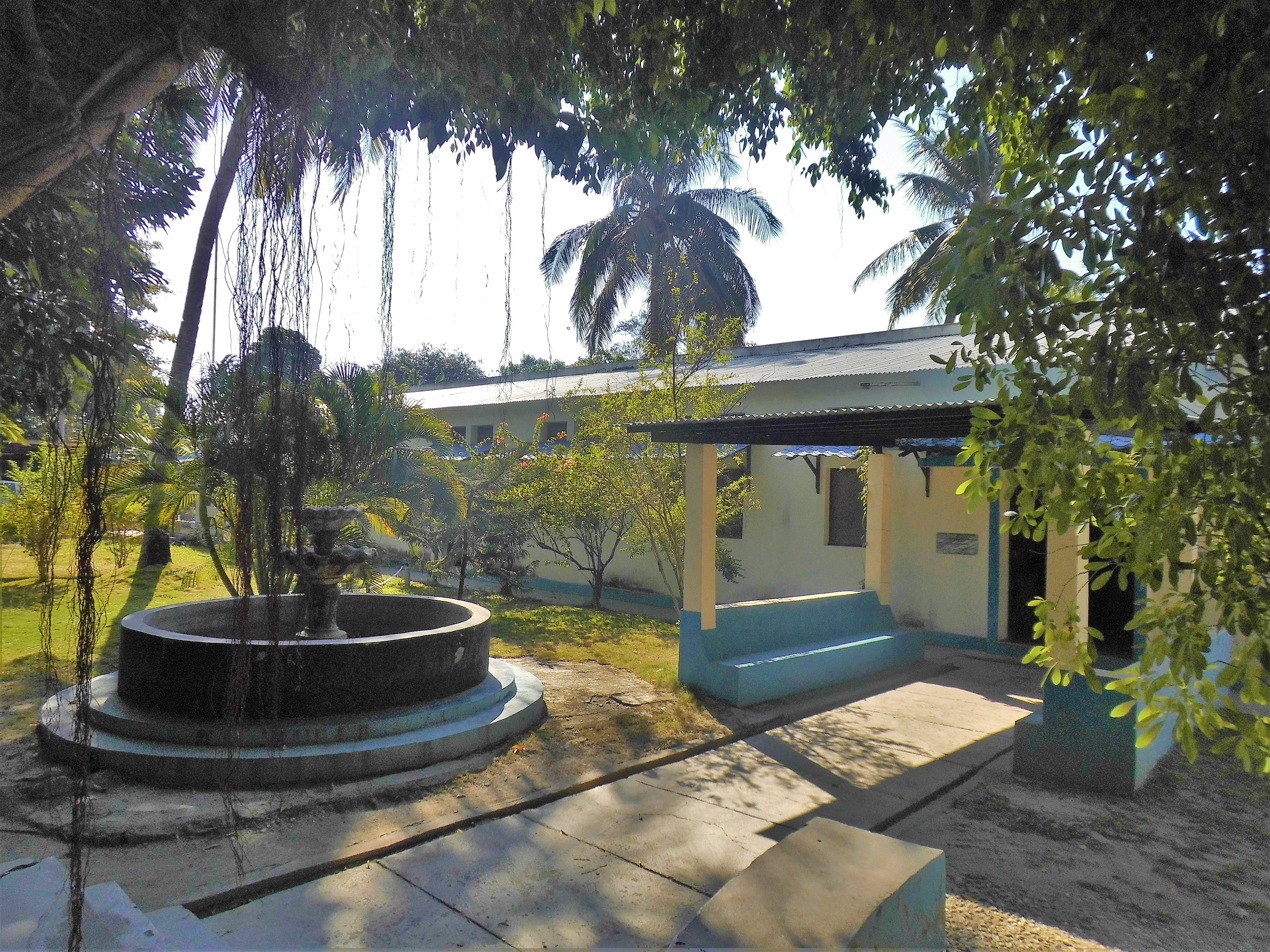
- Interactive map of the Balide Comarca area

General information
- Coordinates: 8.565389°S 125.577722°E
- Construction started: 1963

Balide Comarca is a museum and former prison in Dili, Timor-Leste.

== Construction ==
The Portuguese colonial administration built the prison in 1963 on marshy land in an area notorious for mosquitos. It was surrounded by Portuguese military buildings. It replaced a prison behind Government Palace.

== Indonesian occupation ==
From 7 December 1974 the Indonesian military took over the prison and detained independence activists as well as criminals charged with minor offences and members of Indonesian National Armed Forces who broke disciplinary rules.

People from across East Timor were detained in the prison from 1976. It was the only prison in Dili until 1986. Women detainees were moved here the same year.

The prison was under control of military police, remaining so until 1999, though the Indonesian government had ordered it to be run by the Justice Ministry in 1990.

=== Torture ===
Detainees were subject to torture, including beatings, being boiled in a barrel of water, being forced to stand in the prison yard during hotest parts of the day, electrocution and rape. Both men and women were tortured.

There were cells known as "dark cells" with no windows, which prisoners dreaded being sent to, because many sent to those cells died. These cells were overcrowded and filthy. If one prisoner in one of these cells fell ill, others would become ill soon after.

Conditions did improve in the 1990s due to interventions by the International Committee of the Red Cross and Amnesty International.

== 1999 ==
After the independence referendum in 1999, the attacks carried out by Indonesian forces included burning the prison, though prisoners managed to escape before the burning.

== Post independence ==
After independence the building housed the Commission for Reception, Truth and Reconciliation in East Timor. It is now the home of the Centro Nacional Chega!, the Commissions' archive and a museum open to the public.
