= Indonesia–Timor Leste Commission of Truth and Friendship =

The Indonesia–Timor Leste Commission on Truth and Friendship (more commonly known by its Portuguese acronym CVA, Comissão Verdade e Amizade) was a truth commission established jointly by the governments of Indonesia and East Timor in August 2005. The commission was officially created to investigate acts of violence that occurred around the independence referendum held in East Timor in 1999 and sought to find the "conclusive truth" behind the events. After holding private hearings and document reviews, the commission handed in the final report on July 15, 2008 to the presidents of both nations, and was fully endorsed by Indonesian President Susilo Bambang Yudhoyono, providing the first acknowledgement by the government of Indonesia of the human rights violations committed by state institutions in Timor. The commission is notable for being the first modern truth commission to be bilateral.

== Background ==
East Timor was originally colonized by the Portuguese, and remained a colony up until the fall of the military dictatorship in 1974. East Timor declared independence soon afterwards, but Indonesia soon decided to intervene as it became clear that the government of the new state would most likely be leftist. The Indonesian government began Operation Komodo, which was intended to bring about the integration of the East Timorese territory. It began with a propaganda campaign, but after the outbreak of conflict in East Timor, the Indonesian military began a campaign on 7 October starting with an assault on a border post and accumulating with a full-scale invasion utilizing paratroopers and naval support. The United Nations quickly condemned the invasion via resolution, but due to resistance in the Security council, no further action was taken. The United States also tacitly gave their approval, as the dismantling of a pro-communist government helped advance the policy of containment being pursued by the government.

Indonesia occupied the territory for the following two decades. During the administration of the Habibie government, a referendum was held in the occupied area asking if the residents of the area wished to remain a part of Indonesia. Even before the referendum, there was harassment by militia groups in the area, with UN workers being attacked in Maliana. It soon became clear in the wake of the referendum that the referendum result would be overwhelmingly in favor of the "no" option on the ballot; this raised tensions to a boiling point, and within two hours of the announcement of the results, armed militia groups began attacking civilians. Militia continued to attack civilians as they withdrew from the country, and several massacres occurred as the troops filtered out of the area. A UN peacekeeping force known as INTERFET was deployed to stabilize the situation, made up of mostly Australian troops, and was withdrawn with the arrival of normal UN peacekeepers. East Timor eventually transitioned from a UN mandate to an independent country.

== Report ==
The commission itself was announced in August 2006 and sought to establish "the conclusive truth regarding human rights violations to have occurred prior to, immediately after the Popular Consultation on 30 August 1999" as well as "prepare recommendations that can contribute to healing wounds of the past and strengthen friendship". The timing of the commission's creation was criticized by some, as it was believed that it was created to intentionally subvert calls for an international tribunal to deal with the events surrounding the 1999 plebiscite. The commission's mandate allowed it to review documents pertaining to four other inquiries surrounding the events that predated it: "The Indonesian National Commission of Inquiry on Human Rights Violations in East Timor in 1999", "The Indonesian Ad Hoc Human Rights Court on East Timor", "The Special Panels for Serious Crimes", and "The Commission for Reception, Truth and Reconciliation".

The commission was made up of four members appointed from each nation, and these commissioners were instructed to conduct a document review and analyze previous trials and investigations into the subject, including the UN Special Panels for Serious Crimes and Serious Crime Units in Dili, and the report of the Commission of Reception, Truth and Reconciliation of Timor-Leste. The commission also stated its intent to research the "historical background, political dynamics, and institutional structures that shaped events before and during 1999" to "inform its conclusions with a broader understanding of the way in which the causes of the violence in 1999 were connected to previously established institutional structures and practices."

Operating over three years, the commission gave its final report on July 15, 2008, and presented it to the Presidents of Indonesia and East Timor, concluding that "gross human rights violations in the form of crimes against humanity did occur in East Timor in 1999" and that "pro-autonomy militia groups, TNI, the Indonesian civil government, and Polri must all bear institutional responsibility", as well as stating that "from a moral and political perspective the respective states must accept state responsibility for the violations identified in the report." The commission also made recommendations that both nations begin institutional reform enhancing the strength of investigative and prosecuting bodies involved with investigations into the events, as well as forming joint security policy to ensure the safety of individuals in case of the recurrence of violence. It also noted the need to resolve other standing border and security issues between the two nations to allow for more cooperation. Notably, the report gave no recommendations of amnesty or rehabilitation. The report was endorsed by the president of Indonesia, Susilo Bambang Yudhoyono, making it the first recognition of the Indonesian government's complicity in human rights violations in East Timor by Indonesia.

== Reception ==
In Indonesia and Timor, the report was presented to both governments and accepted by both the Timorese and Indonesian governments. However, Timorese NGO Timor-Leste National Alliance for International Tribunal wrote an open letter in response to the commission's findings with several criticisms, including the lack of public consultation with victims and parliamentary approval of the commission, as well as noting that the commission assigned institutional responsibility rather than individual responsibility, "which is contrary to the principles of international laws which were ratified by the state of Timor-Leste and to Article 160 of its constitution which says that there must be a justice process for crimes against humanity.", as well as stating their belief that the CAVR was a more trustworthy and support worthy commission for the government to support.

Internationally, the report had a mixed reception. Some, such as the War Crimes Studies Center at the University of California, Berkeley, said that the commission could be seen as "widely acknowledged as credible and far-reaching.", noting that the Indonesian government's affirmation of the results was important and that the commission made arguments that "there was credible evidence to indicate that Timorese institutions were also responsible for illegal detentions and possibly other crimes."

== See also ==
- History of East Timor
- Commission for Reception, Truth and Reconciliation in East Timor
- Indonesian occupation of East Timor
- Santa Cruz massacre
