= Commission for Reception, Truth and Reconciliation in East Timor =

Independent truth commission in East Timor

The Commission for Reception, Truth and Reconciliation in East Timor (more commonly known by its Portuguese acronym CAVR: Comissão de Acolhimento, Verdade e Reconciliação de Timor Leste) was an independent truth commission established in East Timor in 2001 under the UN Transitional Administration in East Timor (UNTAET) and charged to “inquire into human rights violations committed on all sides, between April 1974 and October 1999, and facilitate community reconciliation with justice for those who committed less serious offenses.” The idea of a truth commission in East Timor was first agreed by the National Council of Timorese Resistance in 2000.

The Commission had a triple mandate as reflected in its name, to address: (1) reception (acolhimento), the return of Timorese displaced into Indonesian West Timor and their reintegration into their communities, which the Commission described as "people embracing each other as East Timorese, of coming back to our selves, living under one roof, after many years of division and violence"; (2) truth seeking, rendering a full accounting of human rights violations between 1974 and 1999 (the end of the period of Indonesian rule), primarily though the collection of 7,669 statements; and (3) reconciliation, conducted through a "novel and previously untested programme" called the Community Reconciliation Process, designed to reintegrate low-level offenders into their community.

The commissioners, all Timorese nationals, were:

- Aniceto Guterres Lopes, from the human rights group "Yayasan Hak"
- Jacinto Alves
- Maria Olandina Isabel Caeiro Alves, chair of "Women against violence"
- Isabel Amaral Guterres
- Father Jovito Araujo, a Catholic priest and former member of the resistance group OJETIL (Organização de Jovens e Estudantes de Timor Leste)
- Jose Estevao Soares
- Agustino de Vasconcelos, a minister in the East Timor Protestant Church (GKTT)

CAVR was housed in the Comarca, a former Portuguese and Indonesian prison, which today houses the Centro Nacional Chega!, the CAVR archive, and a museum open to the public.

During its work, over 10,000 statements were taken from victims and perpetrators, and public hearings were held which were broadcast on tv and radio. The Commission delivered its 2,500-page report entitled Chega! meaning "stop" or "enough" in Portuguese, covering human rights violations from 1974 to 1999, to the President of East Timor on 31 October 2005. The President then handed the report to the Secretary General of the UN as required by law, on 20 January 2006.

Chega! found that East Timor had suffered massive human rights violations, including violations of the right to self-determination, killings and disappearances, forced displacement and famine, detention and torture, violations of the laws of war, political trials, sexual violence, violations of the rights of the child, and violations of economic and social rights. It determined that the death toll during Indonesian rule had been between a low limit of 102,800 and may have been as high as 183,000. It also concluded that the majority of deaths had been the result of actions by the Indonesian army, and that violence in 1999 was the result of a "systematic campaign orchestrated at the highest levels of the Indonesian government." The findings of Chega were affirmed in 2008 by the Indonesia–Timor Leste Commission of Truth and Friendship.

The Chega! report was published in Indonesian and subsequently in English translation by Kompas Gramedia Group. It consists of five volumes:

- Vol 1: CAVR’s work and mandate; history of the conflict; analysis of the occupying power and the resistance; profile of human rights violations 1974-1999.
- Vol 2: Human rights violations: self-determination; unlawful killings and forced disappearances; forced displacement and famine.
- Vol 3: Human rights violations (cont.): arbitrary detention, torture and ill-treatment; violations of the laws of war; political trials; rape, sexual slavery and other forms of sexual violence; violations of the rights of the child; economic and social rights.
- Vol 4: Findings on responsibility and accountability; the community reconciliation process; victim support; recommendations.
- Vol 5: Appendices on: crimes against humanity in 1999, data and statistical methods, indictments by the Serious Crimes Unit, and acknowledgements (including donors); glossary; index.

== Follow-up ==
The Chega! Report was never debated in parliament, although the government of Timor-Leste says it implemented the majority of the report’s recommendations.

Follow-up work on education, archives, memorialization, advocacy, victim support and other aspects are carried out by the Centro Nacional Chega!, established in 2016 by then prime minister Rui María de Araújo.

Several non-governmental organizations are also active in pushing for full implementation of the Chega! Recommendations, including the Chega for Us Association (ACBIT) and Asia Justice and Rights (AJAR).
