= List of massacres in Timor-Leste =

The following is a list of massacres that have occurred in Timor-Leste (numbers may be approximate):

Name	Date	Location	Deaths	Notes
Ration truck massacre	20 February 1942	Dili	16	16 Australian soldiers who were driving a ration truck to Dili were captured by Japanese soldiers. The Japanese forced four of the soldiers to follow the truck on foot and were shot and bayoneted near the Comoro River. 11 of the 12 remaining men were executed when they entered Dili. Another soldier on a motorcycle was also captured and executed in Dili a little while later.
1942 Aileu massacre	31 August 1942	Aileu	10+	Five Portuguese soldiers and several civil servants were massacred by the pro-Japanese Colunas Negras.
Bebui River massacre	1 June 1959	Bebui River	6+	In late May several people, Luis 'Xina' da Costa Rego, Joao 'Chiquito' Pereira da Silva, Jose 'Zeca' de Sousa Gama and several family members of Antonio 'Metan' da Costa Soares, were arrested by Portuguese forces and on 1 June they were taken to the Bebui River where they were all dumped into the river. They were arrested for an alleged plot for a colony-wide rebellion on New Year's Day known as the 'Dili plot'. Six days after the executions, the Viqueque rebellion began.
1959 Viqueque killings	December 1959	Viqueque Municipality	7	Seven men Alberto Ribeiro, Abílio de Meneses, João Soares, Feliciano Soares, Paulo, Nara-Leque and Armindo were executed by Portuguese soldiers.
Berloi-Fatisi River killings	20 August 1975	Fatisi	8	Eight men detained by Fretilin on suspicions of being spies for the UDT. Five of them were taken to the Berloi River and executed while the other three were executed near Fatisi.
Paramin massacre	22 August 1975	Paramin	11	11 civilians who were falsely accused of being UDT supporters were gunned down by members of Fretilin.
Meti Oan killings	27 August 1975	Wedauberek, Alas Administrative Post, Manufahi Municipality	11	11 members of Fretilin were executed by members of the UDT at the Meti Oan beach in Wedauberek.
Klaek Reman and Aifu massacres	1 September 1975	Klaek Reman and Aifu	30	UDT members brought four detained Fretilin members to Klaek Reman, and picked up another detainee along the way and stabbed them all with spears, killing four of them. Later that day in Aifu they killed 26 detainees.
Balibo massacre	16 October 1975	Balibo	5	A few months before the invasion of East Timor five journalist, reporter Greg Shackleton and sound recordist Tony Stewart who were both Australian, a New Zealand cameraman Gary Cunningham and two Brits cameraman Brian Peters and reporter Malcolm Rennie were summarily executed by the Indonesian Army.
Massacre of APODETI detainees	November, 1975	Unknown	200+	Shortly before the Indonesian invasion hundreds of APODETI detainees were executed, one of the victims was former rebel leader Antonio Metan.
Dili massacre	7–8 December 1975	Dili	3,500+	Over 2,000 East Timorese and 500 Chinese migrants were massacred by the Indonesian Army, during the first two days of the invasion. The two most known individual incidents were those at Colmera and the Dili Wharf.
Matadouro massacre	7 December 1975	Matadouro, Dili	31-78+	The Indonesian Army rounded up over 80 men outside the Assistência building in Matadouro, they opened fire on the group, killing 23 to 70. At least eight people were executed outside the Matadouro Slaughterhouse at around the same time.
Colmera massacre	7–8 December 1975	Colmera, Dili	27~	The Indonesian Army shot dead 14 Chinese residents in Colmera, after an Indonesian paratrooper accidentally hanged himself when his parachute got stuck on Toko Lay. The next day the soldiers executed 13 Chinese workers on the beach. However it is believed up to 500 Chinese were massacred in Dili.
Ailok Laran massacre	8 December 1975	Ailok Laran, Bairro Pite, Dili	17-18	The Indonesian Army detained a group of civilians and split them up into men, women and children. They led the group to the Maloa River in the suburb of Ailok Laran. The soldiers pulled a young man from the group and questioned him, shortly after they shot him dead and opened fire on the rest, killing either 17 or 18, with only one of them surviving.
Dili Wharf massacre	8 December 1975	Dili	150+	Over 150 people including Six members of Fretilin, Isabel Lobato, Rosa Bonaparte, Bernardino Soares and Francisco Borja da Costa, Bimba da Silva and Silvinia da Silva, along with Australian journalist Roger East were gunned down by the Indonesian Army along a cliff overlooking the Port of Dili.
Hat Nipah and Same massacres	27–29 January 1976	Hat Nipah and Same	48	Members of Fretilin took eight UDT prisoners to Hat Nipah and gunned them down, leaving only two survivors, one of whom was stabbed with a spear and shot dead the next day in Holarua. Later that morning 11 detainees who were being driven away from the elementary school in Same, to somewhere else to be executed, but they all jumped out of the truck, nine of which were able to escape while the other two were shot dead. In retaliation for the escape attempt they entered the elementary school and gunned down around 30 detainees, leaving only three survivors.
Aileu massacre	February 1976	Aileu	4,000~	The Indonesian Army is believed to have killed up to 4,000 people in the city of Aileu, which at the time had a population of 5,000. In September of the same year the population was only at 1,000.
Lamaknan massare	June 1976	Lamaknan	4,000+	Indonesian soldiers who had just suffered a heavy loss attacked a refugee camp housing around 5,000 to 6,000 Timorese refugees near the West Timor border, the soldiers massacred over 4,000 people.
Assalaino and Sepelata killings	14 May 1978	Assalaino and Sepelata, Lautém Municipality	7	Eight Hansip officers who were suspected of being in contact with Falintil, were taken to the Indonesian bases in Assalaino and Sepelata and executed seven of them, releasing the last officer. Two of them men's bodies were found in Assalaino and one was found in Sepelata, while the other four bodies remain missing.
Garaulu and Afaloicai massacres	November–December 1978	Garaulu and Afaloicai, Baucau Municipality	24	13 men were taken from Afaloicai, and were interogatted and tortured for two days. The men were then taken to Garaulu and shot dead, a week later two more men were also taken to Garaulu and executed. The next month seven men were executed in Afaloicai.
Laleia massacre	February 1979	Laleia	16	14 Hansip officers who were working as informants for Falintil and two civilians were summarily executed by the Indonesian Army.
Sabailolo Gorge massacre	22–23 February 1979	Turiscai, Foholau, Manufahi	13	Members of the Indonesian Army rounded up around 30 civilians in Turiscai, they separated the men from the group and took 12 of them to the edge of the Sabailolo gorge, and opened fire on them, all but one of them died. The next day they executed the last two who were brothers.
Matebian massacre	December 1979	Matebian	48	48 men who were falsely accused of being members of Fretilin, disappeared after having been detained at Matebian.
Manatuto Hotel disappearances	September 1980	Manatuto	17	17 people including two members of Fretilin disappeared from the Manatuto Hotel after having been detained by the Indonesian Army.
Lacluta massacre	September 1981	Lacluta	400+	Over 400 Timorese were massacred by the Indonesian Army during Operasi Keamanan.
Kraras massacre	August–October 1983	Viqueque Municipality	287	Series of mass killings across the Viqueque Municipality committed by the Indonesian Army.
Ossoala disappearances	23 September 1983	Ossoala, Baucau	10	The Indonesian army detained 10 civilians in the village of Ossoala. All 10 men weren't seen again since 23 September. It's believed they were executed later that day.
Maluro bombing	4 November 1983	Maluro, Lore	9	The Indonesian army killed nine civilians in a mortar attack in the town of Maluro.
Muapitine massacre	8 December 1983	Muapitine, Lospalos, Lautém	5	Members of the Indonesian army forced the villagers themselves to publicly execute five resistance men in Muapitine.
Santa Cruz massacre	12 November 1991	Dili	250+	Indonesian soldiers fatally shot and bayoneted at least 250 pro-independence supporters during the funeral of 18-year-old activist, Sebastião Rangel Gomes.
Galitas massacre	25 January 1999	Galitas, Zumalai, Cova Lima	4	Members of the Mahidi murdered four pro-independence activists in Galitas.
Ritabou ambush	16 March 1999	Ritabou, Maliana, Bobonaro	4	Four members of Fretilin, Pedro dos Santos, Domingos dos Santos, Jóse Barros and Fonseca Asu Mau were ambushed and killed by the Indonesian Army and Halilintar militiamen during a meeting in Ritabou.
Liquiçá Church massacre	5 April 1999	Liquiçá	30-100	Members of the Indonesian Army and Besi Merah Putih massacred over 200 catholic civilians at the church in Liquiçá.
Manuel Carrascalão house massacre	17 April 1999	Dili	12	12 people were killed by the pro-Indonesia Aitarak militia, commanded by Eurico Guterres, including Carrascalão's 17-year-old son Manelito, who was tortured and hacked to death.
Cailaco massacre	12–24 April 1999	Cailaco, Bobonaro	20~	At least 20 people during a two-week period in and around the Cailaco Administrative Post. The killings were committed by the Indonesian Army along with the local Cailaco militia and the Dadurus Merah Putih, Guntur Batu-Laka, Halilintar, and the Kaer Metin Merah Putih militias.
Dili Diocese massacre	5 September 1999	Dili	15-24+	Around 15 to 24 people who were seeking refuge in the Dili Diocese headquarters were massacred by the Indonesian Army and Aitarak militiamen. 11 of the bodies were discovered in a burnt out truck which included those of victims killed in the attack.
Suai Church massacre	6 September 1999	Suai	136-200	Members of the Indonesian Army and Laksaur massacred over 130 civilians at the Ave Maria Church in Suai.
Mau-Nuno massacre	23 September 1999	Mau-Nuno, Ainaro Municipality	11	Members of the Mahidi murdered 11 people in Mau-Nuno and forcibly relocated the remaining villagers to West Timor.
Massacre at the Veromoco River	25 September 1999	Veromoco, Lautém Municipality	9	Members of the pro-Indonesian militia Team Alfa, led by Joni Marques, murdered nine people at Malaiada on the northern coastal road from Lautém to Baucau. Among the victims were two nuns, three priests and an Indonesian journalist Agus Muliawan.
Maubusa market bombing	29 May 2001	Maubusa, Balibo	5	Former members of the Dangi Dadaras Merah Putih militia threw around four hand grenades over the Loes River, which was around 50 to 100m away, from the Indonesian side of the market to the East Timorese side killing five and injuring over 40. The attack was in retaliation for the men getting in debt to a cross border gambling ring, and were targeting those involved in the operation. One of those killed was the leader of the operation, but the rest were all uninvolved.
2002 Dili protests	3–5 December 2002	Dili	2-5	Two to five people were killed by police during a protest, over 20 others were injured.
2006 Dili riots	28 April 2006	Dili	60~	Rebel leaders alleged that soldiers loyal Mari Alkatiri massacred up to 60 people and dumped them in a mass grave.
2006 Dili riots	28 April 2006	Dili	5	The F-FDTL fired on former soldiers who were rioting leaving five dead.
2006 Dili riots	5 May 2006	Dili	5	Five people were killed when riots broke out and rioters began attacking government buildings.
Caicoli massacre	24 May 2006	Caicoli, Dili	8-10	Members of the F-FDTL led by general Taur Matan Ruak lined up around 35 unarmed PNTL officers at their headquarters in Dili. The soldiers then opened fire on the officers killing eight to ten of them and injuring 27. The shooting lasted around 40 seconds. Among the injured were a Filipino and Pakistani.
2006 Dili clashes	27 May 2006	Dili	3	At least three civilians were hacked to death with machetes during a clash between rival gangs.
Kulu Hun shooting	17 November 2018	Kulu Hun, Dili	3	An intoxicated off duty police officer, José Mina and three other officers attempted to stop an argument between two men at a during a kore metan, while this was happening a power outage occurred and Mina then stood on a bench and began to fire his service pistol into the darkness killing three 18-year-old men, Leo Sequeira, Luis Belo and Erick Bria, five others were injured. Mina and the three other officers were all arrested.

== See also ==
- Battle of Timor
- East Timorese civil war
- Indonesian occupation of East Timor
- East Timor genocide
- 1999 East Timorese crisis
- 2006 East Timorese crisis
