= Maliana =

- City
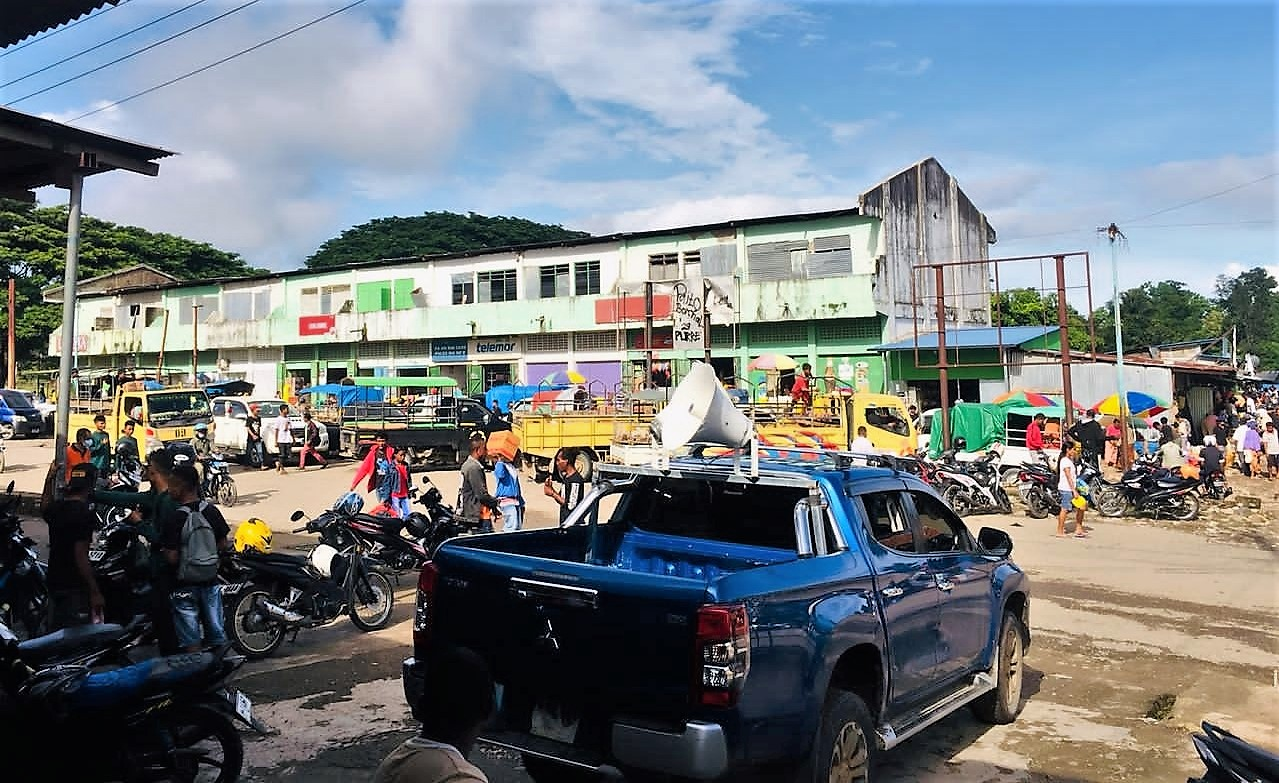
- Market of Maliana

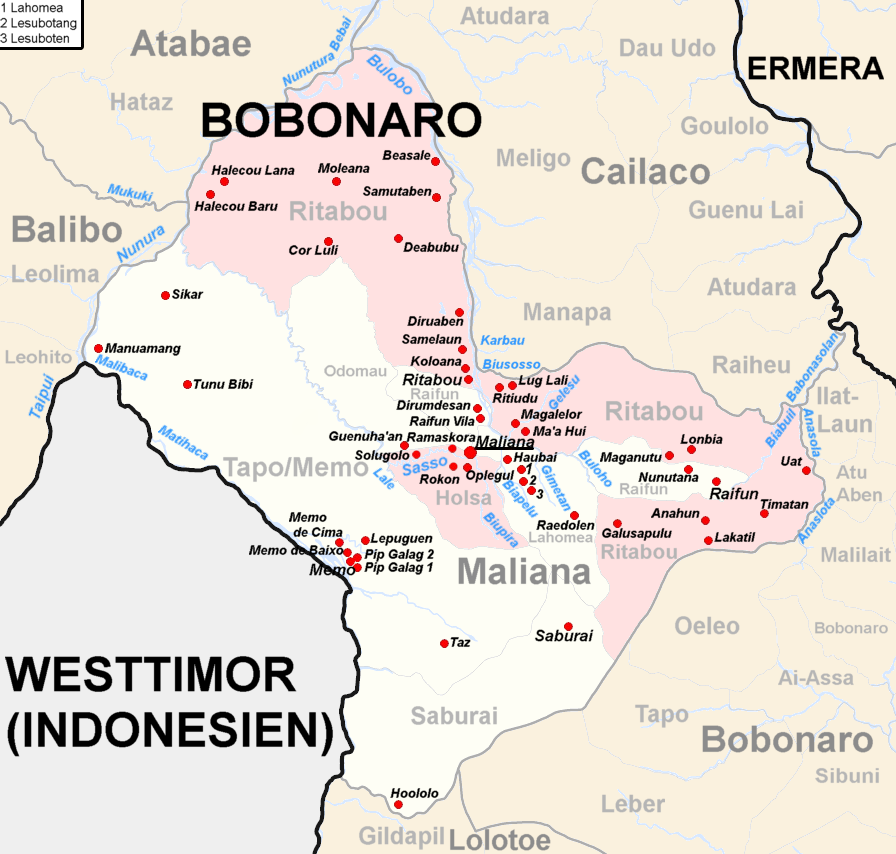
- Administrative post and city of Maliana

- Location in Timor-Leste
- Coordinates: 8°59′30″S 125°13′11″E
- Country: Timor-Leste
- Municipality: Bobonaro
- Administrative post: Maliana

Area
  - Total: 239.35 km^{2} (92.41 sq mi)
- Elevation: 402 m (1,319 ft)

Population (2015 census)
  - Total: 12,220
  - Density: 51.05/km^{2} (132.2/sq mi)
- Time zone: UTC+09:00 (TLT)
- Climate: Aw

Maliana is a city in Timor-Leste, 149 kilometers southwest of Dili, the national capital. It has a population of 22,000. It is the capital of the district of Bobonaro and Maliana Subdistrict, and is located just a few kilometers from the border with Indonesia. It is also the see city of the Roman Catholic Diocese of Maliana, which was formed by Pope Benedict XVI with territory taken from the Roman Catholic Diocese of Dili.

Maliana an important agriculture sector, especially rice production. The majority of Maliana's population is heavily dependent on agriculture for their livelihoods, this is because rice became the preferred staple food among many Timorese. Most of the population are farmers cultivating rice and maize. During Indonesian occupation, Maliana became a rice barn town to support other districts in East Timor, and export to other places in Western Timor of Indonesia.

Maliana has seven villages consisting of Lahomea, Holsa, Ritabou, Odomau, Raifun, Tapo-Memo and Saburai. There are two main sources of water irrigation that supply water to paddy fields such Bulobu River, Nunura River, Malibaka and Bui Pira river. Bunak and Kemak are the native dialects of Maliana but most people understand and speak Tetum. Maliana had one of the preferred schools during Portuguese occupation, known as Collegio Infante sagres. This was under a catholic mission and many East Timor educated people have graduated from this senior high School.

The citizens of Maliana were instrumental to the Australian army between 1999 and 2001, during the UNTAET operation. Employed as "Locally Employed Civilians" by a small contingent from the 110th Signals Squadron, the people of Maliana provided domestic support, as well as local intelligence regarding the threat of Indonesian militia to the soldiers and civilian contractors working in the area.

Australian newsman Greg Shackleton and his colleagues (the "Balibo Five") filed news reports from Maliana (then in Portuguese Timor) shortly before their fateful trip to Balibo in October, 1975.

== Sister cities ==
City of Knox, Australia

Municipality of Leichhardt, Australia
