= Atabae Administrative Post =

Administrative post in Bobonaro Municipality, Timor-Lester

Atabae
- Administrative Post
- Posto Administrativo de Atabae (Portuguese); Postu administrativu Atabae (Tetum)
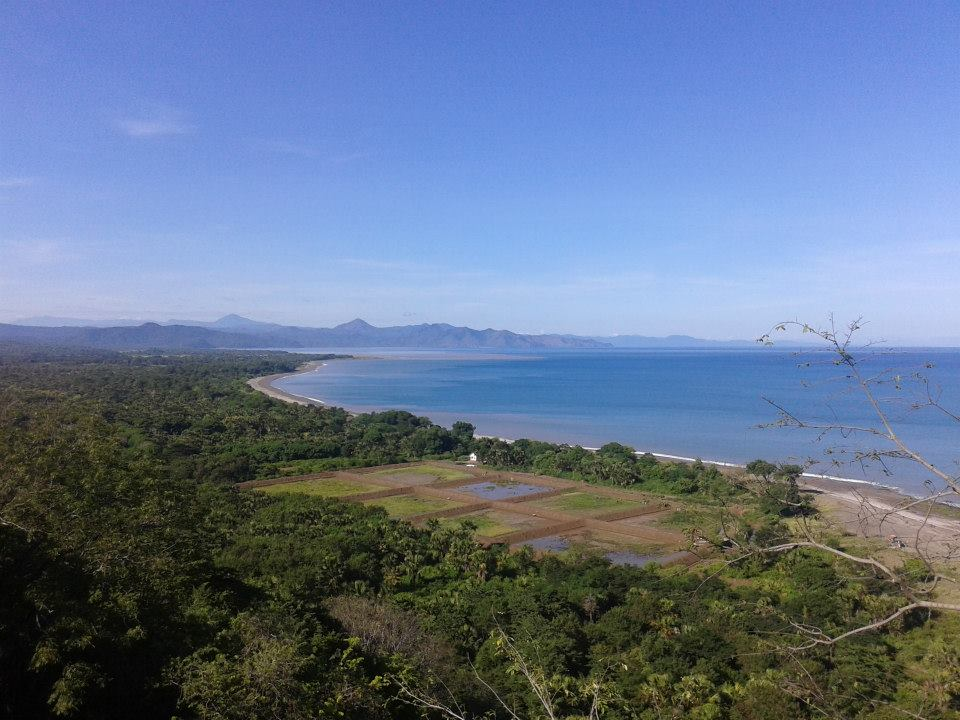
- Atabae landscape

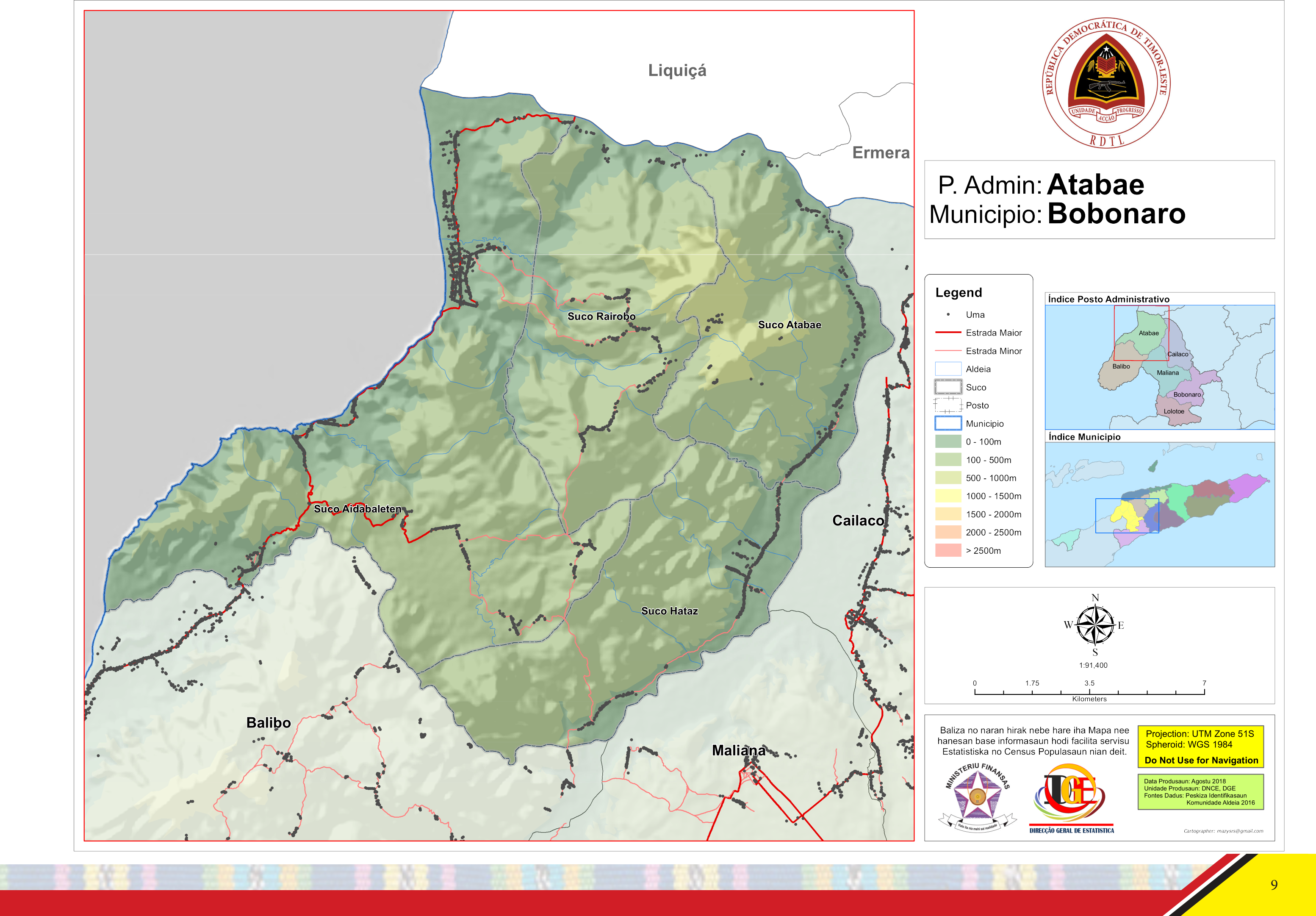
- Official map

- Location within East Timor
- Coordinates: 8°50′S 125°12′E
- Country: Timor-Leste
- Municipality: Bobonaro
- Seat: Aidabaleten
- Sucos: Aidabaleten; Atabae; Hataz; Rairobo

Area
  - Total: 251.8 km^{2} (97.2 sq mi)

Population (2015 census)
  - Total: 10,963
  - Density: 43.54/km^{2} (112.8/sq mi)

Households (2015 census)
  - Total: 1,894
- Time zone: UTC+09:00 (TLT)

Atabae, officially Atabae Administrative Post (Portuguese: Posto Administrativo de Atabae, Tetum: Postu administrativu Atabae), is an administrative post (and was formerly a subdistrict) in Bobonaro municipality, Timor-Leste. Its seat or administrative centre is Aidabaleten, which is sometimes wrongly named Atabae, too. Its population at the 2010 census was 10,976.

The real village of Atabae is in the suco of Rairobo.
