= Batugade =

Suco in Timor-Leste

Coordinates: 8°57′33″S 124°57′03″E

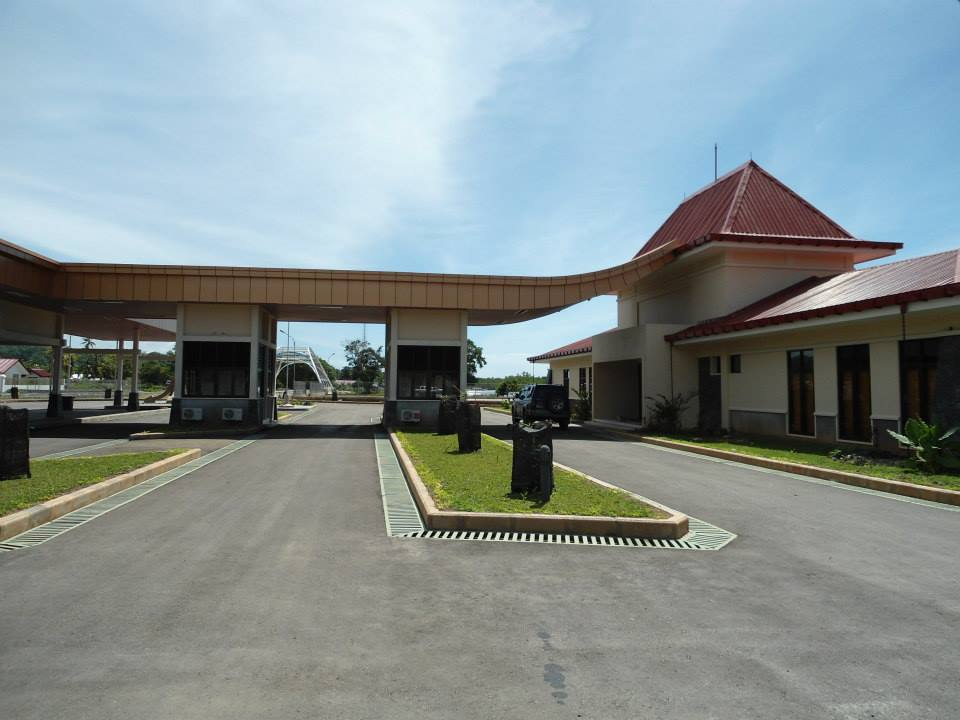
The new Timor-Leste customs, immigration and quarantine checkpoint at Batugade.

Batugade is a suco (village) located in Balibó Subdistrict, Bobonaro Municipality of Timor-Leste. The administrative seat of the suco is the village of Batugade.

Batugade is located on the main road between Dili and Kupang, the capital of Nusa Tenggara Timur Province of Indonesia in the western part of Timor island. A major immigration post for the border crossing into Indonesia, called the Batugade Integrated Border Post, is located about 3km from the village of Batugade.

== Border Crossing ==
The Batugade Integrated Border Post is located near the Timor-Leste-Indonesia border, about 3km from the village. This is the main border crossing into Indonesia with complete customs, immigration and quarantine (CIQ) facilities. The border crossing checkpoint on the Indonesian side is called Mota'ain.

The new CIQ complex was opened on 4 February 2012 by then Timor-Leste Prime Minister Xanana Gusmão. The border crossing facilities includes a dock for boats to ensure maritime control and curb illegal trade between Indonesia and Timor-Leste. The complex replaced the old checkpoint which consisted of several small buildings which were set up to handle border crossing procedures when Timor-Leste separated from Indonesia. The Batugade Customs checkpoint collects the second highest amount of revenue after Customs at Dili Port.

== Shooting Incident of 1999 ==
On 10 October 1999, International Force East Timor (INTERFET) troops - a platoon from 2 RAR - patrolling along the main road between Batugade and Mota'ain were shot at as they were approaching the border bridge at Mota'ain while still within East Timor territory. Reports stated that the shots were fired by either pro-Indonesian militia or the Indonesian police. The INTERFET troops returned fire and in the ensuing clash, one Indonesian was killed. Reports stated that a meeting between the Indonesian army and INTERFET following the incident established that the INTERFET troops were still about 100 metres inside East Timor territory when they were fired upon.

== Gallery ==
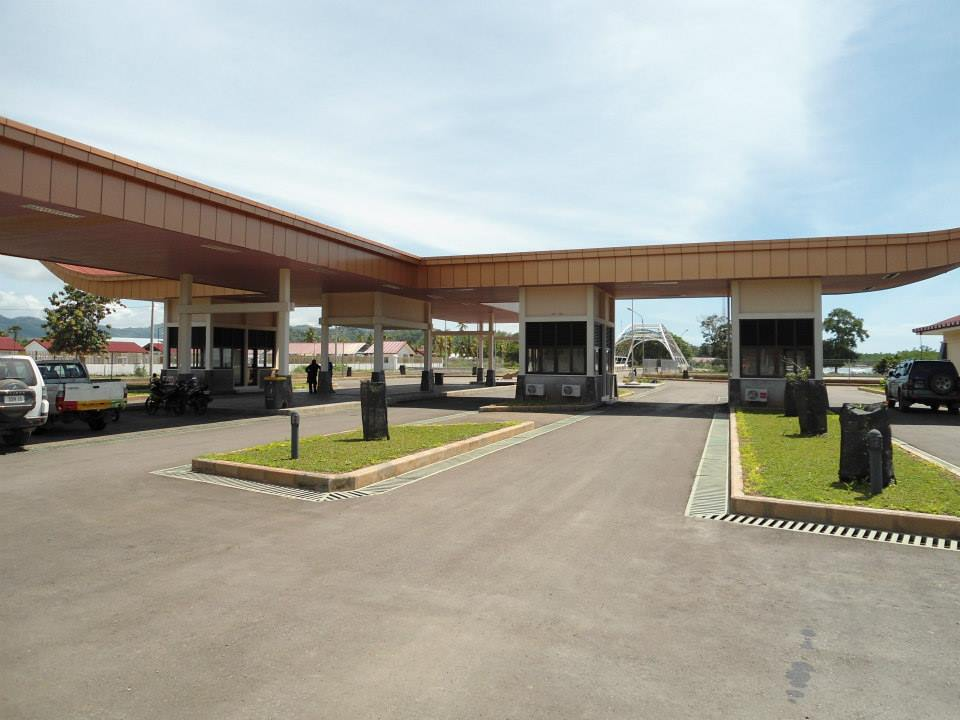
Another view of the new immigration post building, looking towards the border.

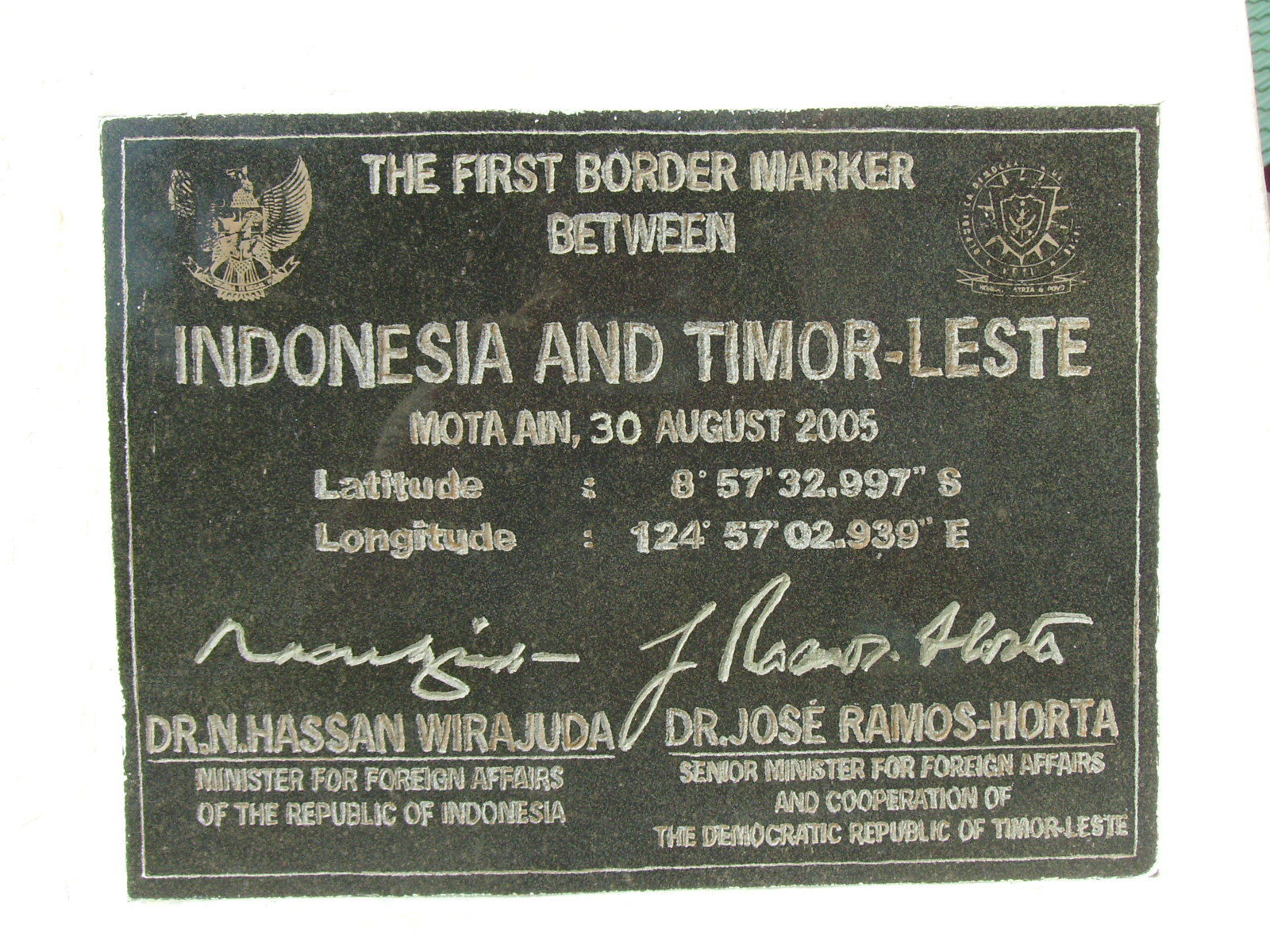
Plaque on one of the pair of border markers on each side of the river marking the Timor-Leste-Indonesia boundary at Mota'ain/Batugade.

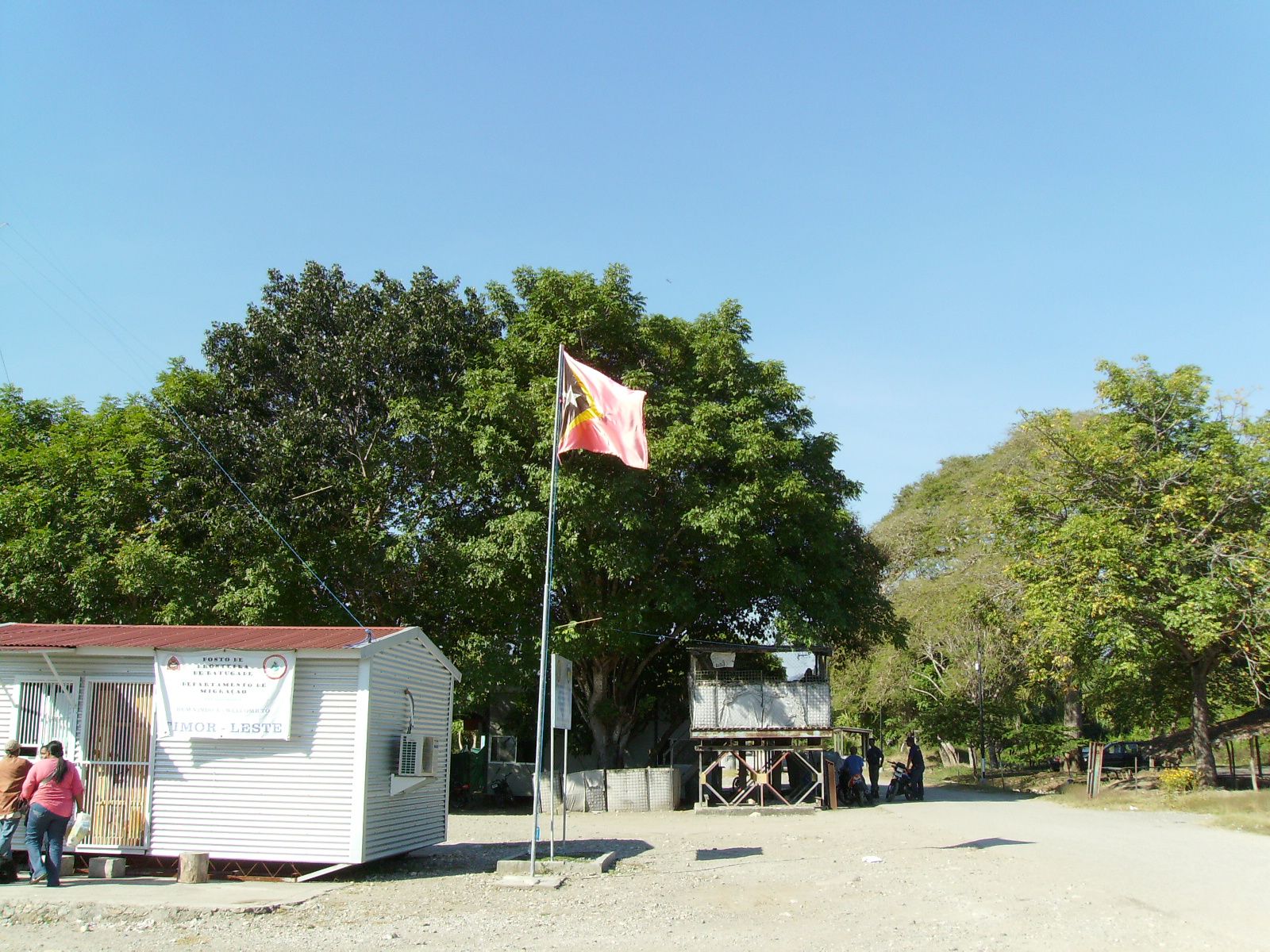
The old immigration checkpoint housed in a wooden building.

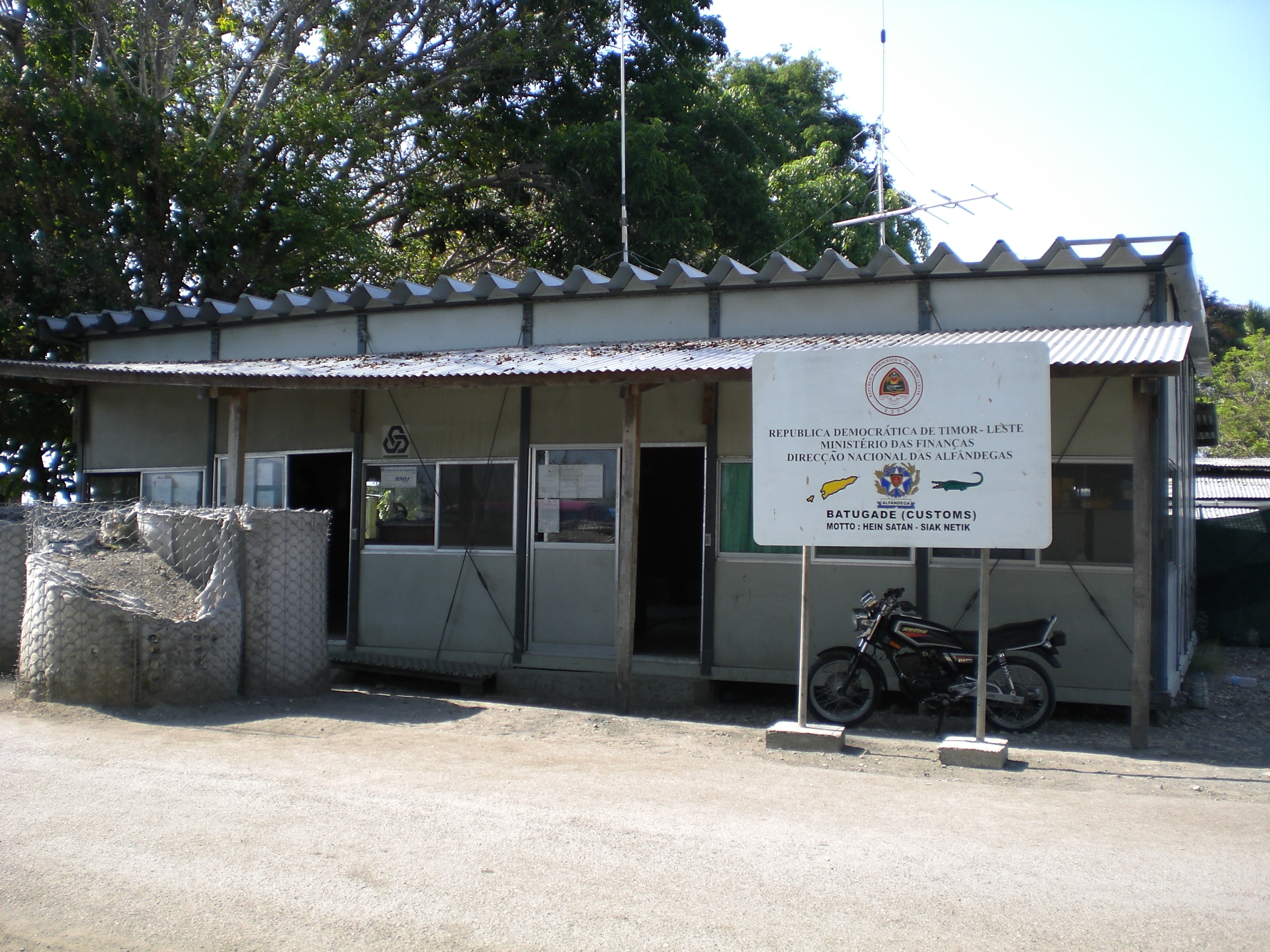
The old customs office housed in a temporary cabin.
