= Bobonaro Municipality =

Municipality of East Timor

Bobonaro
- Municipality of Timor-Leste
- Município Bobonaro (Portuguese); Munisípiu Bobonaru/Buburnaru (Tetun)
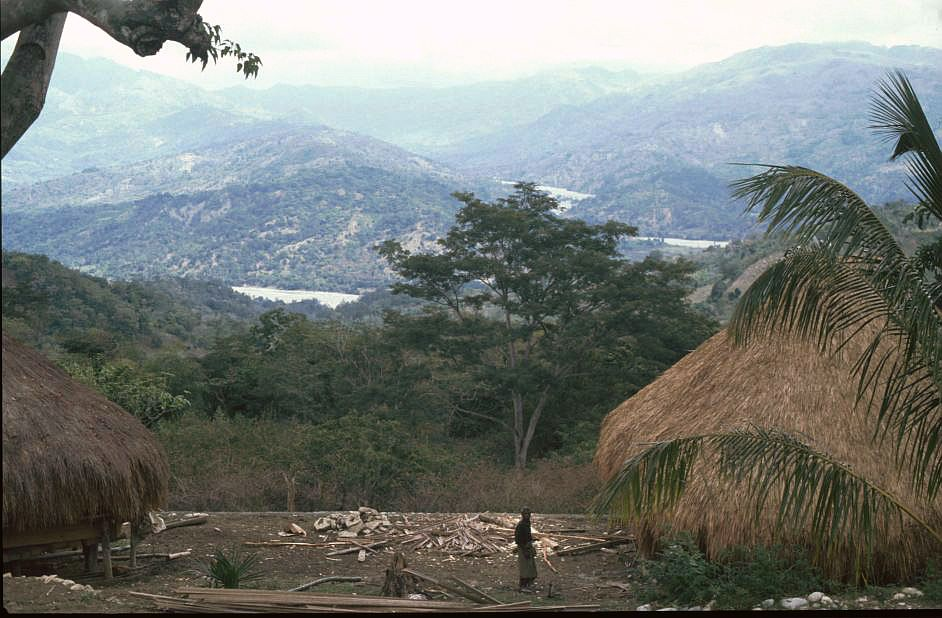
- Close to Maliana

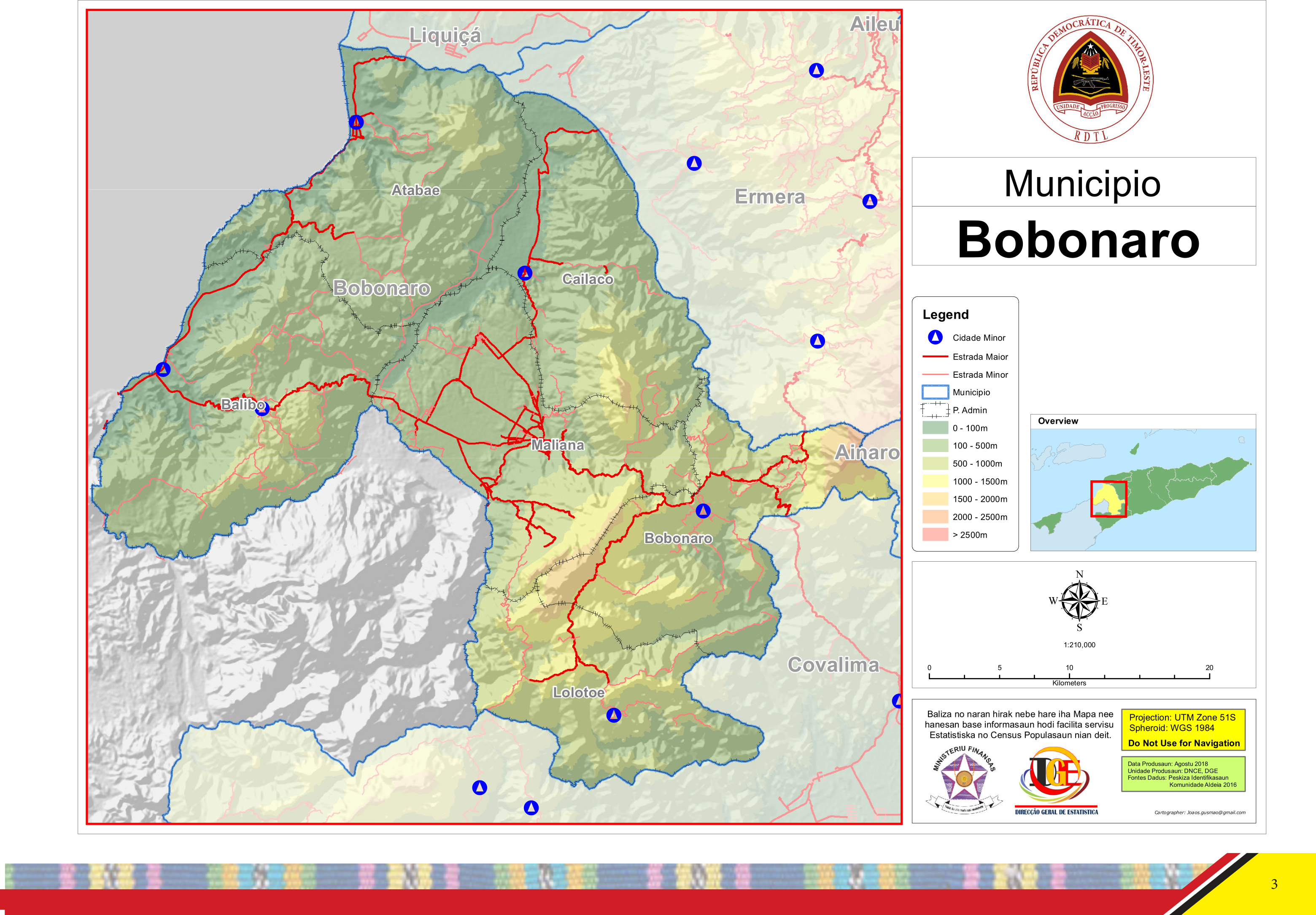
- Official map

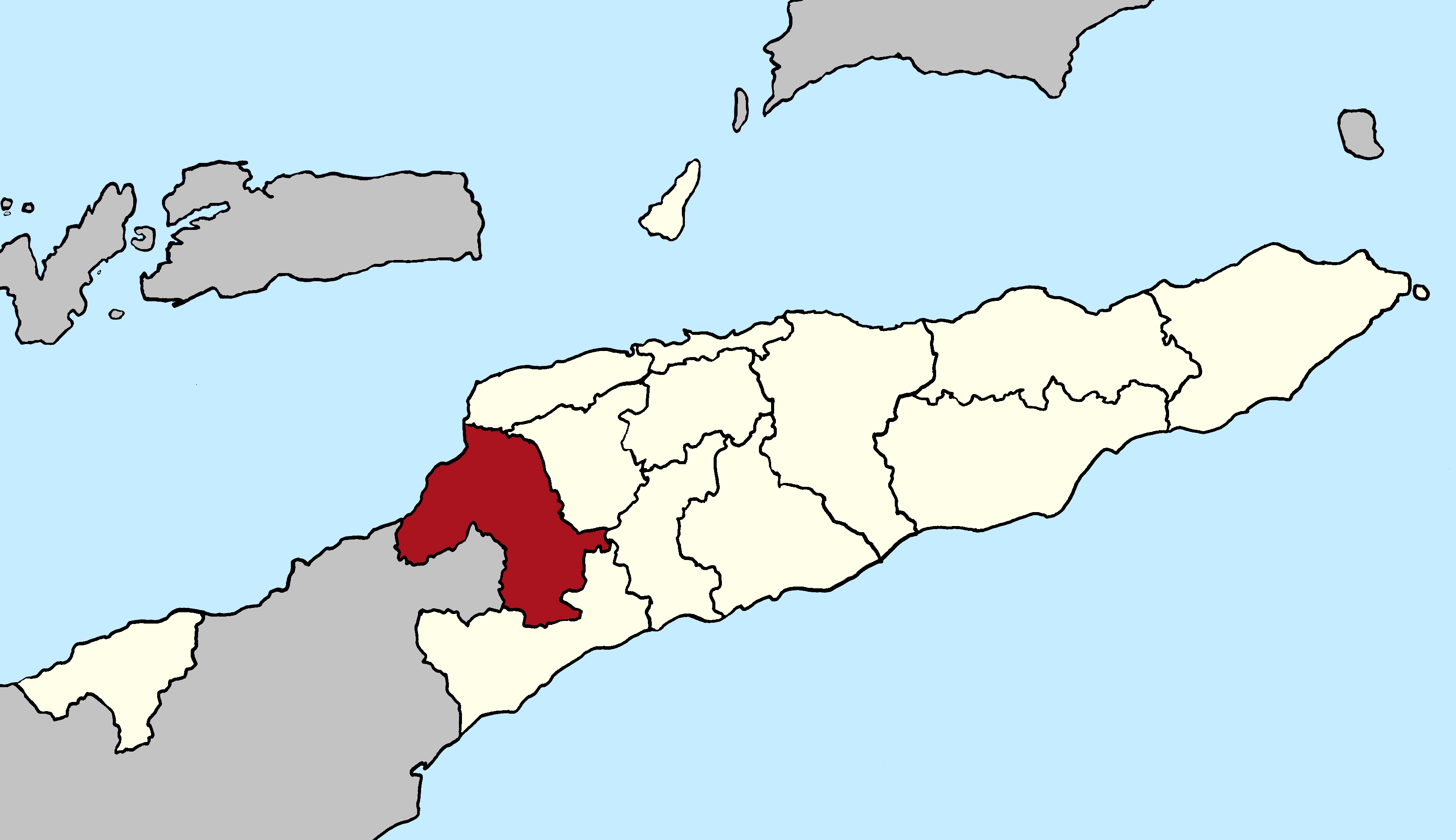
- Bobonaro in Timor-Leste
- Interactive map of Bobonaro
- Coordinates: 8°55′S 125°15′E
- Country: Timor-Leste
- Capital: Maliana
- Administrative posts: Atabae; Balibo; Bobonaro; Cailaco; Lolotoe; Maliana

Area
  - Total: 1,378.1 km^{2} (532.1 sq mi)
  - Rank: 5th

Population (2015 census)
  - Total: 97,762
  - Rank: 4th
  - Density: 70.940/km^{2} (183.73/sq mi)
  - Rank: 7th

Households (2015 census)
  - Total: 17,635
  - Rank: 4th
- Time zone: UTC+09:00 (TLT)
- ISO 3166 code: TL-BO
- HDI (2017): 0.606 medium · 8th
- Website: Bobonaro Municipality

Bobonaro (Portuguese: Município Bobonaro, Tetun: Munisípiu Bobonaru, or Munisípiu Buburnaru) is a municipality (and was formerly a district) in Timor-Leste. It is the second-most western municipality on the east half of the island. It has a population of 92,045 (Census 2010) and an area of 1,376 km^{2}.

== Toponymy ==
Bobonaro is said to be a Portuguese approximation of the Tetum language word Buburnaru, which means 'tall eucalypt', but there are also other explanations for the origin of the municipality's name.

Ho (transl. 'blood') and nalu, the name of a traditional woven basket also called a 'bote' or a 'taan', are words in the local Bunak language. The basket is worn on the back with a strap on the forehead. In combination, ho and nalu mean 'basket of blood' or 'basket of life', and Bobonaro approximates the combination.

Additionally, the combination of the words bobo (transl. 'hide') and naru (transl. 'long') in another local language, Kemak, refer to a safe place where one can hide for a long time.

== Geography ==
The Savu Sea lies to the north of Bobonaro. The municipality borders the municipalities of Liquiçá to the northeast, Ermera to the east, Ainaro to the southeast, and Cova-Lima to the south. To the west lies the Indonesian province Nusa Tenggara Timur. In Portuguese Timor, the then district had the same boundaries as the present municipality; however its capital was at Vila Armindo Monteiro, which is now called Bobonaro.

The capital of Bobonaro is Timor-Leste's fourth largest city, Maliana. As of 2004 it had a population of 13,200. It sits at 9.00°S and 125.22°E, 149 km from to the southwest of the national capital, Dili. The next two largest cities in the municipality are Bobonaro City (also known as Aubá), with 6,700 people; and Lolotoi with a population of 3,800. Another village is Atabae in Atabae Administrative Post.

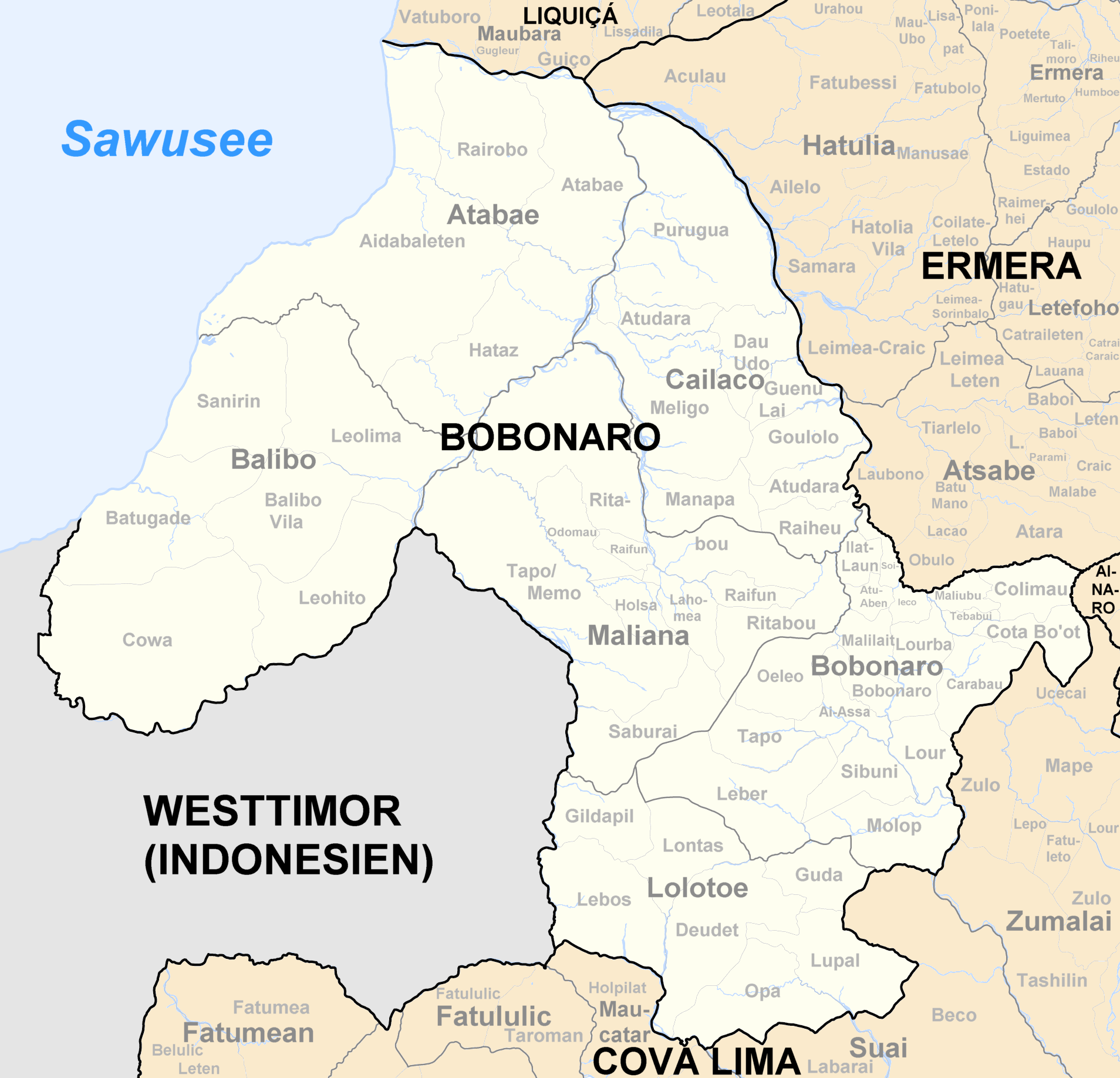
Sucos and subdistricts of Bobonaro

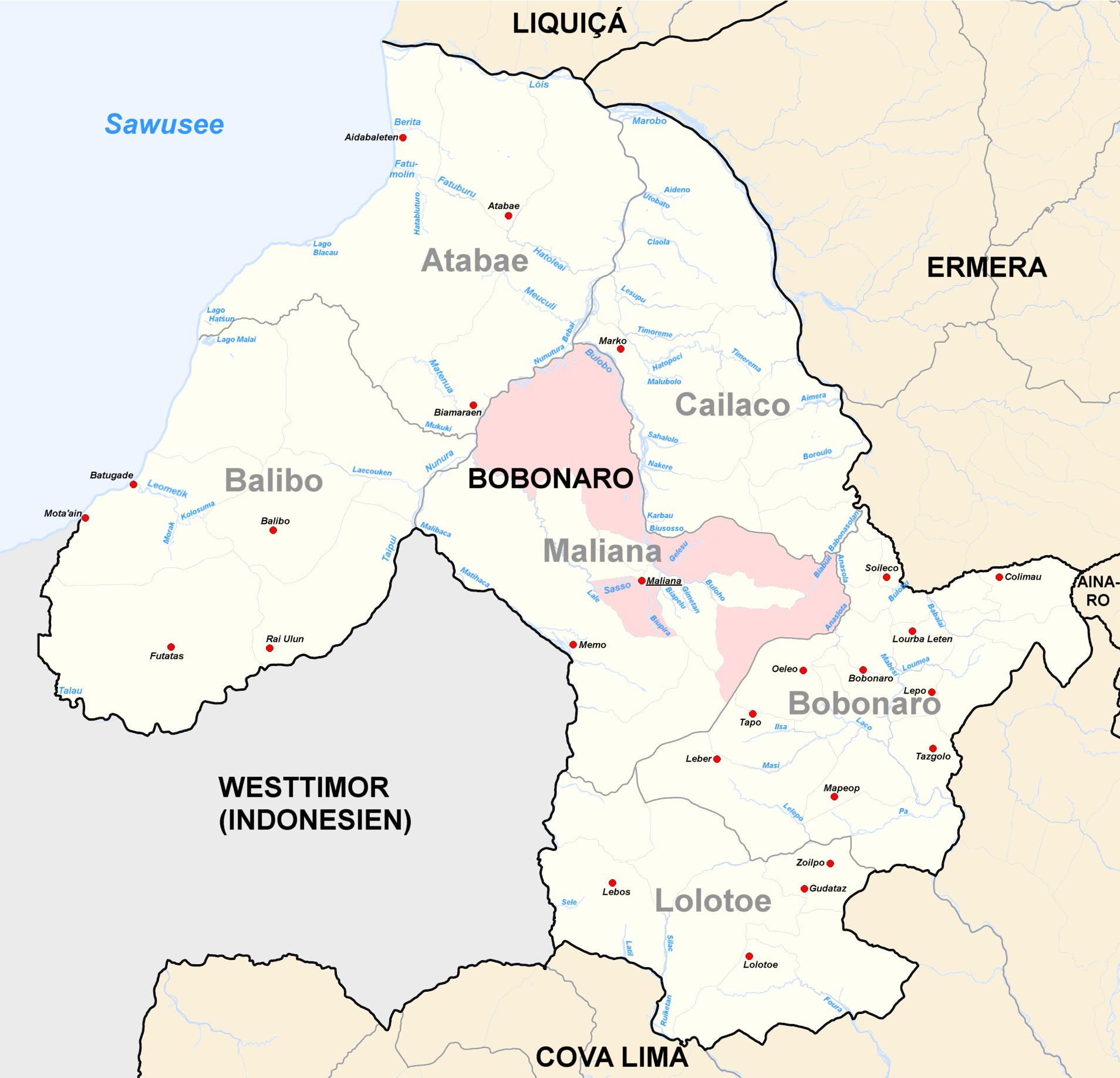
Cities and rivers of Bobonaro

Coastal sites in Bobonaro (Sanirin, Batugade and Aidabaleten) have been included in a north-west marine protected area initiative supported by the Ministry of Agriculture, Livestock, Fisheries and Forestry and Conservation International Timor-Leste.

== Administrative posts ==
The municipality's administrative posts (formerly sub-districts) are:

- Atabae
- Balibo
- Bobonaro
- Cailaco
- Lolotoe (also spelled Lolotoi); and
- Maliana.

The administrative posts are divided into 50 sucos ("villages") in total.

== Infrastructure ==
The main road between Dili and the Indonesian border at Batugade runs through this municipality, clinging closely to the coast for almost its entire length through the municipality. It runs through Atabae and Balibó administrative posts.

=== Border crossings ===
The main border crossing between Timor-Leste and Indonesia is located in this district at Batugade where the Timor-Leste Immigration Post is located. The Indonesian checkpoint is located in Mota'ain in Belu Regency, Nusa Tenggara Timur Province. Another minor border crossing checkpoint is maintained by the Immigration Service of Timor-Leste within this municipality at Tunibibi near Maliana. The Indonesian post for this crossing is at Turiskain, also in Belu Regency.

== History ==
The municipality had been a popular destination in Timor, due to its mountains and hot springs, but it suffered much violence in the war for independence. Balibó, located about 10 miles from the Indonesian border, was estimated by Human Rights Watch to be 70% destroyed during the militia violence that preceded the referendum for East Timorese independence. It was also the site of the killing of five Australian-based journalists (the Balibo Five) by Indonesian forces on 16 October 1975 during an incursion by Indonesia into what was then Portuguese Timor.

On 29 May 2001, former members of Dadaras Merah Putih who had become indebted to a cross border gambling ring in Maubusa, in retaliation they threw around four grenades over the Loes River from the Indonesian side towards the market in the East Timorese side killing five, one of the leaders of the gambling ring were killed, but the other four were uninvolved, over 40 others were wounded in the attack. Their bodies were taken to the Indonesian side, and have yet to be publicly identified with the exception of a 20-year-old woman, Rosina Olaloco.

== Demographics ==
In addition to the official languages of Tetum and Portuguese, a large part of Bobonaro speaks the Malayo-Polynesian languages Bekais and Kemak and Papuan language Bunak, which are designated "national languages" by the constitution.

== See also ==
- Battle of Aidabasalala
