= Cailaco Administrative Post =

Administrative post in Bobonaro Municipality, Timor-Leste

Cailaco
- Administrative Post
- Posto Administrativo de Cailaco (Portuguese); Postu administrativu Kailaku (Tetum)
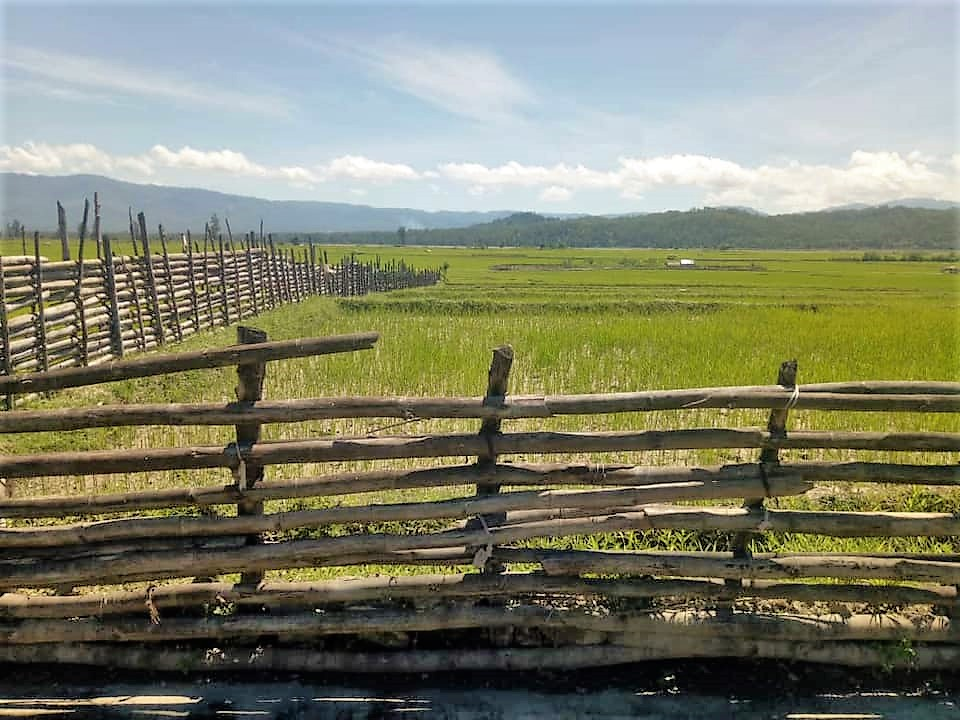
- Guenu Lai landscape

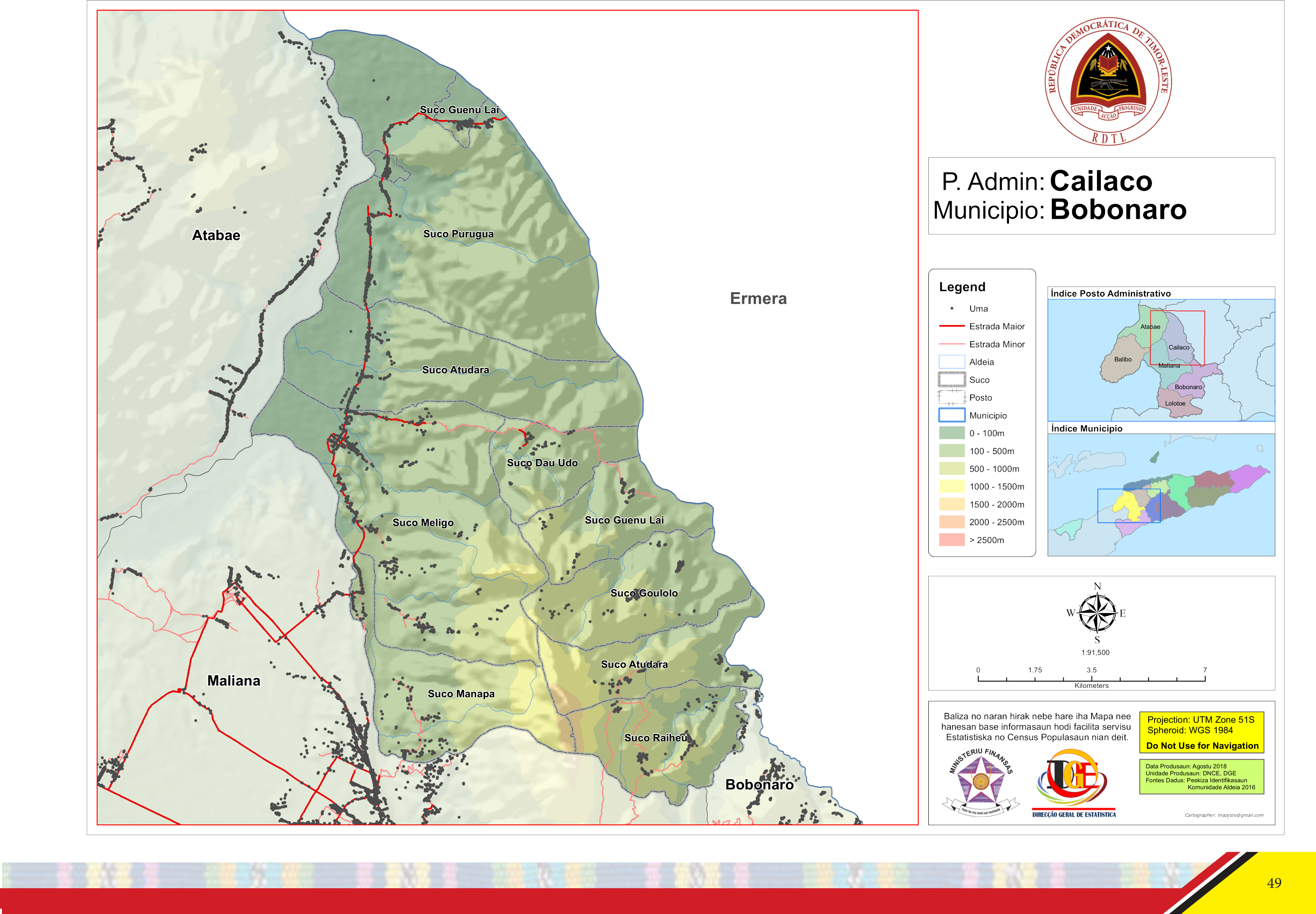
- Official map

- Location within East Timor
- Coordinates: 8°54′S 125°17′E
- Country: Timor-Leste
- Municipality: Bobonaro
- Seat: Meligo
- Sucos: Atudara; Dau Udo; Goulolo; Guenu Lai; Manapa; Meligo; Purugua; Raiheu

Area
  - Total: 208.0 km^{2} (80.3 sq mi)

Population (2015 census)
  - Total: 10,405
  - Density: 50.02/km^{2} (129.6/sq mi)

Households (2015 census)
  - Total: 1,863
- Time zone: UTC+09:00 (TLT)

Cailaco, officially Cailaco Administrative Post (Portuguese: Posto Administrativo de Cailaco, Tetum: Postu administrativu Kailaku), is an administrative post (formerly a subdistrict) in Bobonaro municipality, Timor-Leste. Its administrative centre is in Suco Meligo, and its population at the 2004 census was 8,374.

== History ==
In April 1999, an event known as the Cailaco massacre left at least 20 deaths. The killings were carried out by Indonesian soldiers and pro-Indonesian militias. The massacre started on 12 April 1999 after an Indonesian soldier and a local pro-autonomy activist, Manuel Gama, were ambushed and killed in Purogoa village.

Later that day, soldiers and militiamen searched for suspects. They arrested four independence supporters, Paulino Soares (34), José Pou-Lelo (37), Antonio Soares (45), and Manuel Mau Lelo Araújo, and took them to the Joint Intelligence Unit compound, where they were shot dead. That same day, three more men, Carlito Mau Leto (32), Domingos Resi Mau (29), and João Evangelista Lima Vidal (30) were detained and killed in Purogoa. A fourth man, João Matos, a farmer from Meligo village (also Leto's home), is believed to have been killed with them.

In the following days, soldiers and militiamen killed at least 20 people, mistreated hundreds, and committed sexual violence against hundreds of women and girls. On 17 April, two men, Aprigio Mali Tae and Carlos Sama-Lelo were killed by militiamen.

On 19 April, Antonio Basilio and Armando Berlaku were killed in Manapa village by members of the Dadurus Merah Putih. The next day, José Barros and Carnelio were killed by soldiers and members of the Guntur Batu-Laka and Halilintar militias.

On 24 April, Calistro da Cunha was abducted by members of the Kaer Metin Merah Putih militia and Indonesian soldiers. He was taken to Omelain village and handed over to Halilintar militiamen who killed him shortly after. His family buried him the following day in Guda cemetery.
