= Balibo Administrative Post =

Administrative post in Bobonaro Municipality, East Timor

Balibo
- Administrative Post
- Posto Administrativo de Balibo / Balibó (Portuguese); Postu administrativu Balibó (Tetum)
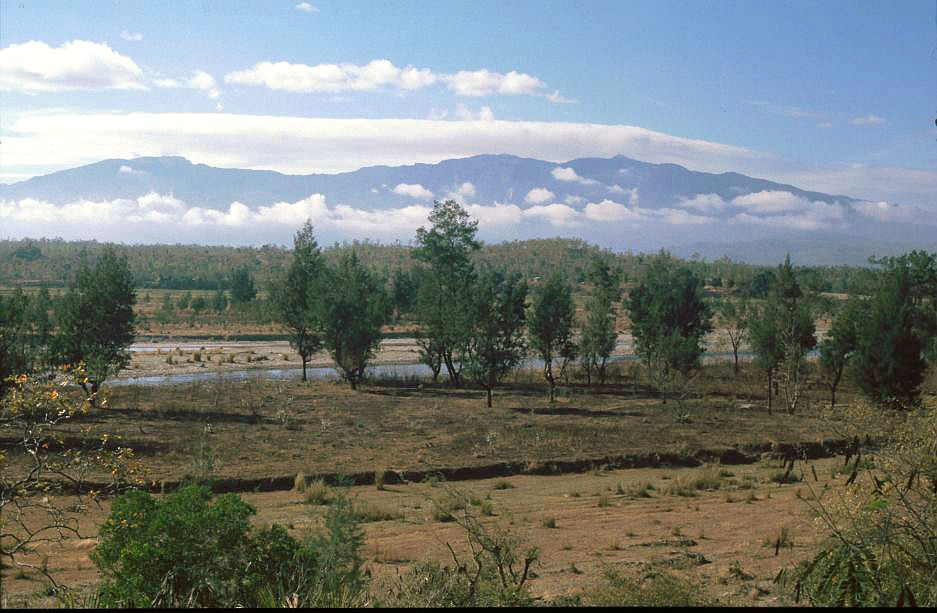
- Balibo landscape

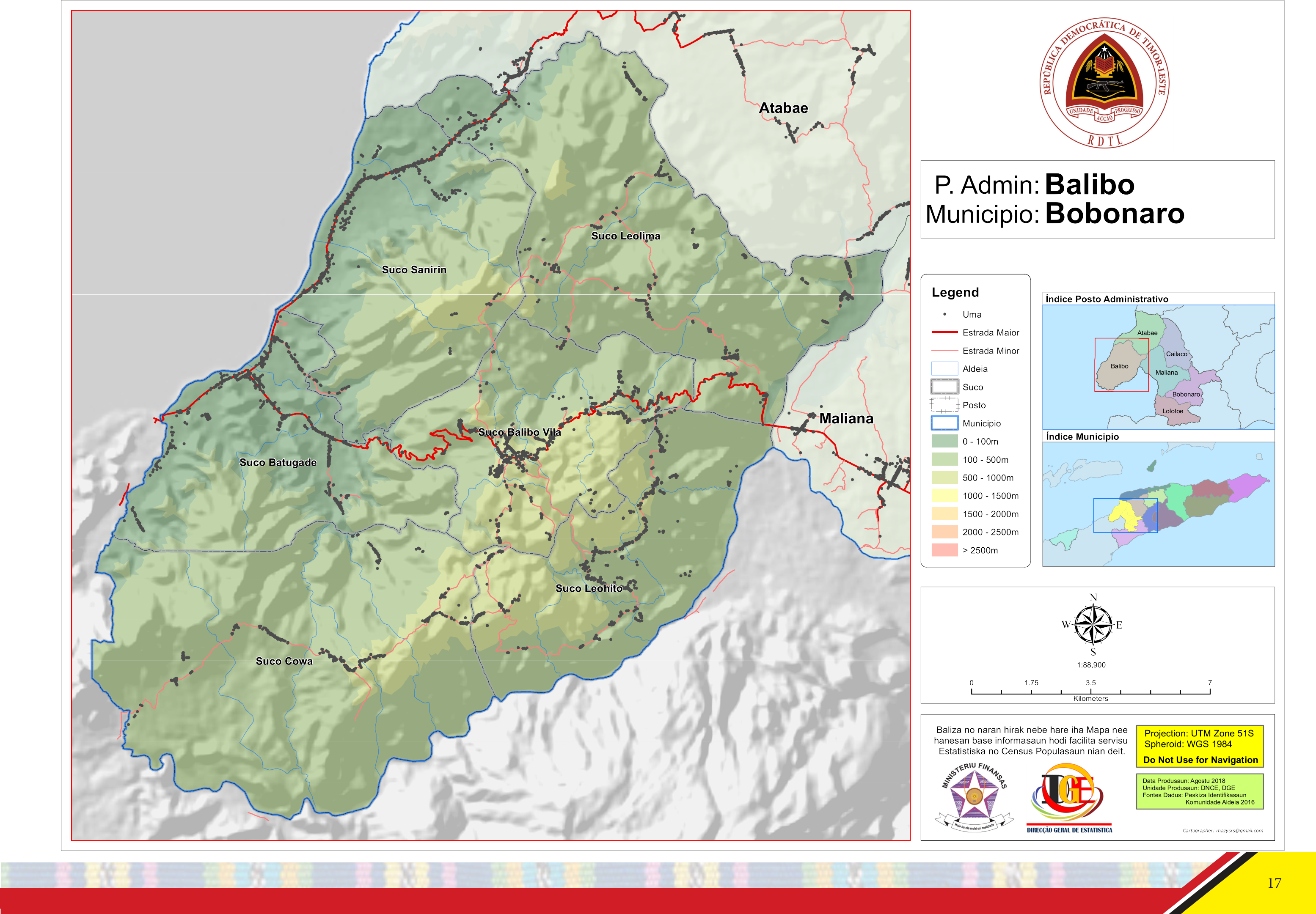
- Official map

- Location within East Timor
- Coordinates: 08°58′S 125°2′E
- Country: East Timor
- Municipality: Bobonaro
- Seat: Balibo
- Sucos: Balibo; Batugade; Cová; Leohito; Leolima; Sanirin

Area
  - Total: 296.0 km^{2} (114.3 sq mi)

Population (2015 census)
  - Total: 15,922
  - Density: 53.79/km^{2} (139.3/sq mi)

Households (2015 census)
  - Total: 3,043
- Time zone: UTC+09:00 (TLT)

Balibo, officially Balibo Administrative Post (Portuguese: Posto Administrativo de Balibo or Balibó, Tetum: Postu administrativu Balibó), is an administrative post (and was formerly a sub-district) in Bobonaro municipality, East Timor. Its seat or administrative centre is the town of Balibo.
