= Kraras massacre =

Series of massacres in 1983 in East Timor

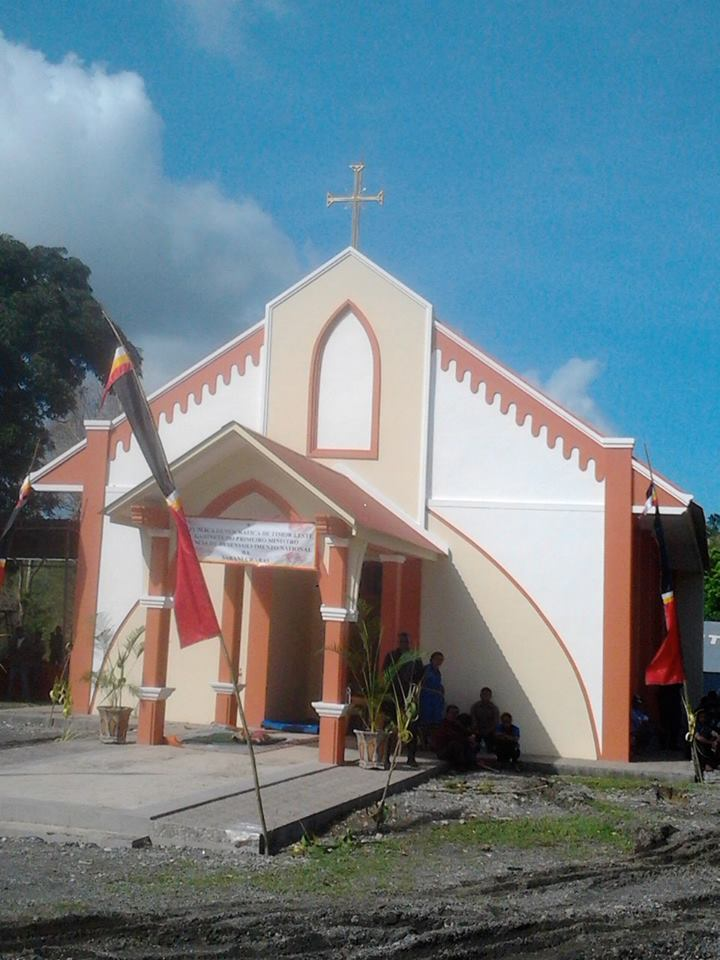
- Church at central place of Kraras
- Location: Kraras, Viqueque Municipality, East Timor
- Date: August – September 1983
- Target: East Timorese residents of Kraras
- Attack type: Massacre
- Deaths: >200
- Perpetrators: Indonesian Army and Timorese Hansip members
- Motive: East Timor genocide

The Kraras massacre was a series of mass killings committed by the Indonesian Army, along with Timorese Hansip members, in August and September 1983 in Kraras, Viqueque Municipality, East Timor. More than 200 civilians, mostly men, died in the killings. The region is now known as the "Valley of Widows".

== Background ==
Until late 1970s, most of the residents of the Bibileo lived outside of the control of the Indonesian army. In 1979, the residents of Bibileo who were captured were relocated to Viqueque. In 1981, they were relocated again to a settlement North of Viqueque, named Kraras.

The Indonesian army's control of the region was helped by two Timorese civilian units. The Hansip were armed and paid by the Indonesian military, while the Ratih (Rakyat Terlatih, "trained people") were not armed or paid. In the beginning of 1983, the Indonesian army decided to downgrade some of the Hansip members in the region to Ratih. However, some Ratih refused to turn in their arms, and instead joined the pro-independence Falintil.

Resentment against the Indonesian occupation was compounded by sexual harassment of local women by the Indonesian army.

== Events ==
On 8 August 1983, the Indonesian military post in Kraras was attacked by Falintil and ex-Ratih members. 14 Indonesian soldiers were killed in the attack. Subsequently, most inhabitants of Kraras fled the settlement and went in hiding in the surrounding mountains, fearing reprisals.

On 7 September 1983, the Indonesian military entered Kraras, burning most of the houses and killing the 4 or 5 people left in the settlement, including an old woman. The military then went to search for the residents in the mountains. Those captured were resettled to Viqueque.

On 16 September 1983, Indonesian soldiers and Hansip members took between 18 and 55 of the ex-Kraras residents to a hole in suco Caraubalu and executed them.

On 17 September 1983, the Indonesian army found ex-residents of Kraras in Buikarin. They took most of the men to a place known as Tahubein and shot them, killing 141 people.

== See also ==
- Lospalos case
