= Atabae =

Village in Timor-Leste

Coordinates: 8°48′S 125°12′E

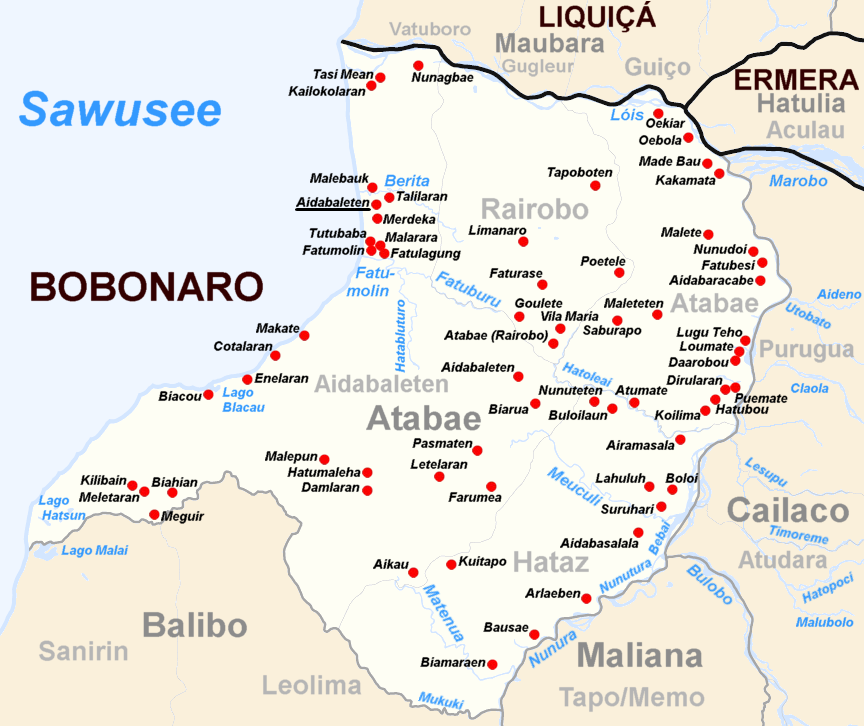
Atabae lies in the north of Bobonaro, in the center of Atabae.

Atabae is a village in the suco of Rairobo (subdistrict Atabae, Bobonaro District, Timor-Leste).

It is the home of a primary school, a hospital, a church, and the former Portuguese cavalry barracks are currently a training center for the National Police of Timor-Leste (PNTL).
