= East Timor genocide =

20th century genocide of the Timorese

- Part of the Indonesian occupation of East Timor
- Cemetery in Santa Cruz visited in memory of the victims of the Indonesian Army's brutality
- Location: East Timor province, Indonesia (Note: East Timor under Indonesian occupation)
- Date: Occupation lasted from 1975 to 1999, though most of the killing occurred in the 1970s and 1980s
- Target: Overwhelming majority were East Timorese civilians
- Attack type: Forced disappearance, genocidal massacre, reprisal, scorched earth, enforced starvation, state terrorism, mass rape, internment, torture, mass execution, mass shootings, democide
- Deaths: estimate ranges from 60,000 to 308,000 apr. 90,800 and 202,600 per UN (Note: Precise estimates of the death toll are difficult to determine. The 2005 report of the UN's Commission for Reception, Truth and Reconciliation in East Timor (CAVR) reports an estimated minimum number of conflict-related deaths of 102,800 (+/− 12,000). Of these, the report says that approximately 18,600 (+/− 1,000) were either killed or disappeared, and that approximately 84,000 (+/− 11,000) died from hunger or illness in excess of what would have been expected due to peacetime mortality. These figures represent a minimum conservative estimate that CAVR says is its scientifically-based principal finding. The report did not provide an upper bound, however, CAVR speculated that the total number of deaths due to conflict-related hunger and illness could have been as high as 183,000. The truth commission held Indonesian forces responsible for about 70% or more of the violent killings. This estimates comes from taking the minimum killed violently applying the 70% violent death responsibility given to Indonesian military combined with the minimum starved.)
- Perpetrators: Government of Indonesia: Indonesian army; Indonesian collaborators
- Motive: Anti-communism (official); Indonesian irredentism; Expansionism

The East Timor genocide refers to the campaign of systematic killings, repression and state terrorism against the East Timorese people by Indonesia's New Order regime between 1975 and 1999, during the invasion and subsequent occupation of East Timor.

The Indonesian military framed their counter-insurgency operations as "pacification" and "anti-communist stabilisation" while operating with total impunity and engaging in a large-scale extermination of the East Timor's population, including mass killings, forced displacement, starvation, and the destruction of East Timor's social and political fabric. During the occupation period, the Indonesian government received diplomatic and military support from Australia and the United States.

A significant body of scholarship has concluded that Indonesia perpetrated genocide in East Timor. According to the Oxford Bibliographies, "the majority of sources consider the Indonesian killings in East Timor to constitute genocide". Many scholars, including Ben Kiernan, who has documented the atrocities in detail, define the campaign as genocide. Other scholars, such as Ben Saul and David Lisson, disagree with using the term to describe the campaign but do not deny the scale of atrocities committed.

Between 60,000 and 308,000 East Timorese died as a result of Indonesia's occupation, representing a substantial proportion of East Timor's population. Victims included civilians killed in massacres, from forced famine and disease in Indonesian-controlled camps, and from torture and political imprisonment. Timorese resistance fighters and civilians alike were targeted in a coordinated genocidal campaign. East Timor's eventual independence in 2002 came after years of sustained resistance and international exposure, but Indonesia has never been held accountable for the genocide it committed.

== Initial invasion ==
On the pretext of protecting its citizens in Timorese territory, Indonesia invaded the eastern part of the East Timor island and declared it as its 27th province, renaming it Timor Timur. Indonesia was given the tacit support of the American Government, which saw FRETILIN as a Marxist organization. Framed as a response to Fretilin's proclamation of sovereign rule, Indonesia's intervention was conceived from its perception of Fretilin-controlled East Timor as a threat to regional stability and an adversity to its own strategic interests, including control over the lucrative oil and gas reserves in the Timor Sea. From the start of the invasion in August 1975, the TNI forces engaged in the wholesale massacre of Timorese civilians. At the start of the occupation, FRETILIN radio sent the following broadcast: "The Indonesian forces are killing indiscriminately. Women and children are being shot in the streets. We are all going to be killed ... This is an appeal for international help. Please do something to stop this invasion." One Timorese refugee told later of "rape [and] cold-blooded assassinations of women and children and Chinese shop owners".

Dili's bishop at the time, Martinho da Costa Lopes, said later: "The soldiers who landed started killing everyone they could find. There were many dead bodies in the streets—all we could see were the soldiers killing, killing, killing." In one incident, a group of fifty men, women, and children—including Australian freelance reporter Roger East—were lined up on a cliff outside of Dili and shot, their bodies falling into the sea. Many such massacres took place in Dili, where onlookers were ordered to observe and count aloud as each person was executed. It is estimated that at least 2,000 Timorese were massacred in the first two days of the invasion in Dili alone. In addition to FRETILIN supporters, Chinese migrants were also singled out for execution; five hundred were killed in the first day alone.

The mass killings continued unabated as Indonesian forces advanced on the Fretilin-held mountain regions of East Timor. A Timorese guide for a senior Indonesian officer told former Australian consul to Portuguese Timor James Dunn that during the early months of the fighting TNI troops "killed most Timorese they encountered." In February 1976 after capturing the village of Aileu - to the south of Dili - and driving out the remaining Fretilin forces, Indonesian troops machine gunned most of the town's population, allegedly shooting everyone over the age of three. The young children who were spared were taken back to Dili in trucks. At the time Aileu fell to Indonesian forces, the population was around 5,000; by the time Indonesian relief workers visited the village in September 1976 only 1,000 remained. In June 1976, TNI troops badly battered by a Fretilin attack exacted retribution against a large refugee camp housing 5–6,000 Timorese at Lamaknan near the West Timor border. After setting several houses on fire, Indonesian soldiers massacred as many as 4,000 men, women and children.

In March 1977 ex-Australian consul James Dunn published a report detailing charges that since December 1975 Indonesian forces had killed between 50,000 and 100,000 civilians in East Timor. This is consistent with a statement made on 13 February 1976 by UDT leader Lopez da Cruz that 60,000 Timorese had been killed during the previous six months of civil war, suggesting a death toll of at least 55,000 in the first two months of the invasion. A delegation of Indonesian relief workers agreed with this statistic. A late 1976 report by the Catholic Church also estimated the death toll at between 60,000 and 100,000. These figures were also corroborated by those in the Indonesian government itself. In an interview on 5 April 1977 with the Sydney Morning Herald, Indonesian Foreign Minister Adam Malik said the number of dead was "50,000 people or perhaps 80,000".

The Indonesian government presented its annexation of East Timor as a matter of anticolonial unity. A 1977 booklet from the Indonesian Department of Foreign Affairs, entitled Decolonization in East Timor, paid tribute to the "sacred right of self-determination" and recognised APODETI as the true representatives of the East Timorese majority. It claimed that FRETILIN's popularity was the result of a "policy of threats, blackmail and terror". Later, Indonesian Foreign Minister Ali Alatas reiterated this position in his 2006 memoir The Pebble in the Shoe: The Diplomatic Struggle for East Timor. The island's original division into east and west, Indonesia argued after the invasion, was "the result of colonial oppression" enforced by the Portuguese and Dutch imperial powers. Thus, according to the Indonesian government, its annexation of the 27th province was merely another step in the unification of the archipelago which had begun in the 1940s. The United Nations (UN) would later come to condemn the violences performed by the Indonesian government.

=== Resettlement and enforced starvation ===
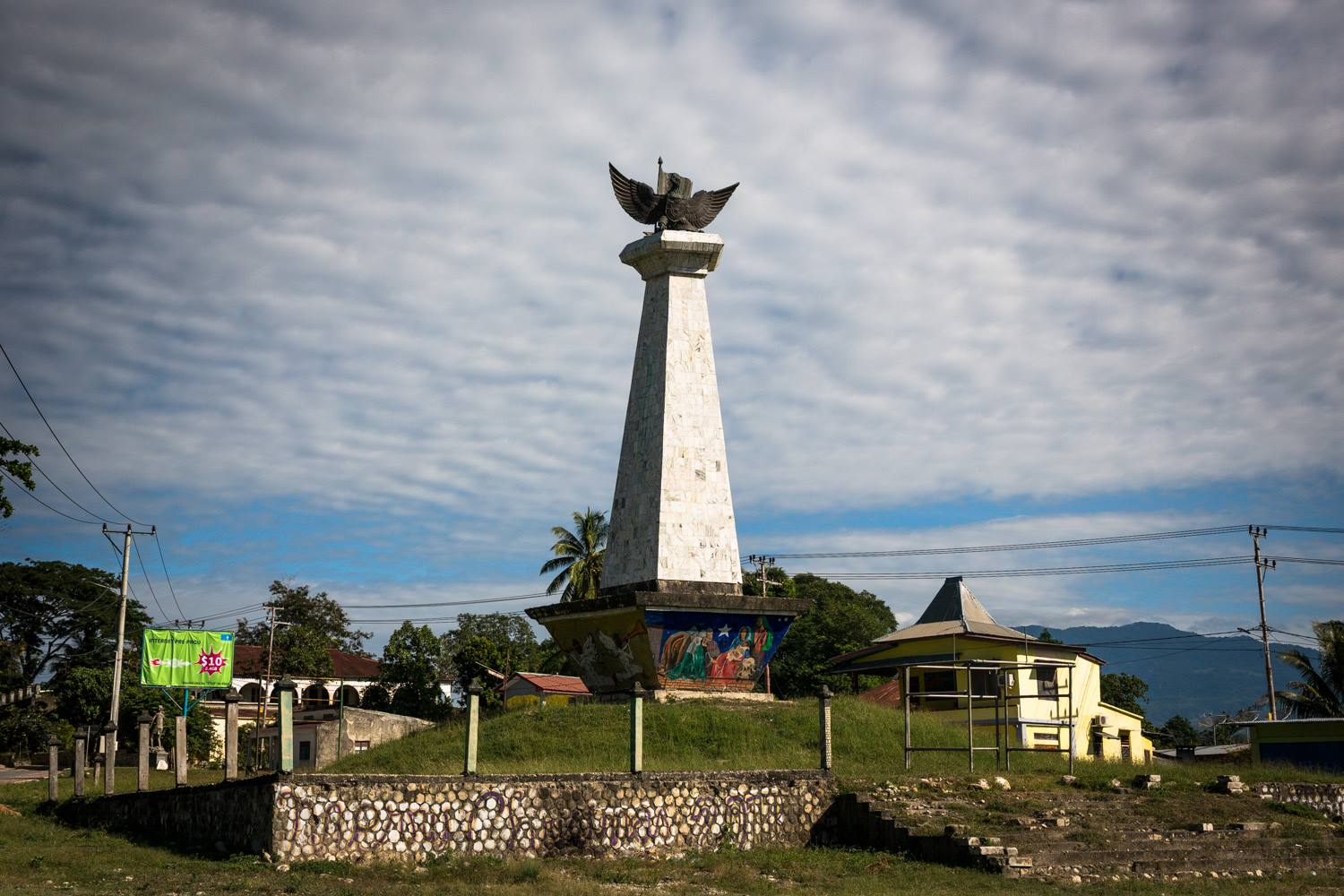
Monument with the National emblem of Indonesia in Viqueque (2016)

As a result of the destruction of food crops, many civilians were forced to leave the hills and surrender to the TNI. Often, when surviving villagers came down to lower-lying regions to surrender, the military would execute them. Those who were not killed outright by TNI troops were sent to receiving centers which were prepared in advance. These camps were located in close proximity to local military bases where Indonesian forces "screened" the population in order to single out members of the resistance, often with the aid of Timorese collaborators. In these transit camps, the surrendered civilians were registered and interrogated. Those who were suspected of being members of the resistance were detained and killed.

These centers were often constructed of thatch huts with no toilets. Additionally, the Indonesian military barred the Red Cross from distributing humanitarian aid and no medical care was provided to the detainees. As a result, many of the Timorese - weakened by starvation and surviving on small rations given by their captors - died of malnutrition, cholera, diarrhea and tuberculosis. By late 1979, between 300,000 and 370,000 Timorese had passed through these camps. After a period of three months, the detainees were resettled in "strategic hamlets" where they were imprisoned and subjected to enforced starvation. Those in the camps were prevented from traveling and cultivating farmland and were subjected to a curfew. The UN truth commission report confirmed the Indonesian military's use of enforced starvation as a weapon to exterminate the East Timorese civilian population, and that large numbers of people were "positively denied access to food and its sources". The report cited testimony from individuals who were denied food, and detailed destruction of crops and livestock by Indonesian soldiers. It concluded that this policy of deliberate starvation resulted in the deaths of 84,200 to 183,000 Timorese. One church worker reported five hundred East Timorese dying of starvation every month in one district.

World Vision Indonesia visited East Timor in October 1978 and claimed that 70,000 East Timorese were at risk of starvation. An envoy from the International Committee of the Red Cross reported in 1979 that 80 percent of one camp's population was malnourished, in a situation that was "as bad as Biafra". The ICRC warned that "tens of thousands" were at risk of starvation. Indonesia announced that it was working through the government-run Indonesian Red Cross Society to alleviate the crisis, but the NGO Action for World Development charged that organisation with selling donated aid supplies.

== Indonesian pacification operations ==
=== Operasi Keamanan: 1981–82 ===
In 1981, the Indonesian military launched Operasi Keamanan (Operation Security), which some have named the "fence of legs" program. During this operation, Indonesian forces conscripted 50,000 to 80,000 Timorese men and boys to march through the mountains ahead of advancing TNI troops as human shields to foreclose a FRETILIN counterattack. The objective was to sweep the guerillas into the central part of the region where they could be eradicated. Many of those conscripted into the "fence of legs" died of starvation, exhaustion or were shot by Indonesian forces for allowing guerillas to slip through. As the "fence" converged on villages, Indonesian forces massacred an unknown number of civilians. At least 400 villagers were massacred in Lacluta by Battalion 744 of the Indonesian Army in September 1981. An eyewitness who testified before the Australian Senate stated that soldiers deliberately killed small children by smashing their heads against a rock. The operation failed to crush the resistance, and popular resentment toward the occupation grew stronger than ever. As FRETILIN troops in the mountains continued their sporadic attacks, Indonesian forces carried out numerous operations to destroy them over the next ten years. In the cities and villages, meanwhile, a non-violent resistance movement began to take shape.

=== 'Operation Clean-Sweep': 1983 ===
The failure of successive Indonesian counterinsurgency campaigns led the commander of the Dili-based Sub regional Military Resort Command, Colonel Purwanto to initiate peace talks with FRETILIN commander Xanana Gusmão in a FRETILIN-controlled area in March 1983. When Xanana sought to invoke Portugal and the UN in the negotiations, ABRI Commander Benny Moerdani broke the ceasefire by announcing a new counterinsurgency offensive called "Operational Clean-Sweep" in August 1983, declaring, "This time no fooling around. This time we are going to hit them without mercy."

The breakdown of the ceasefire agreement was followed by a renewed wave of massacres, summary executions and "disappearances" at the hands of Indonesian forces. In August 1983, 200 people were burned alive in the village of Creras, with 500 others killed at a nearby river. Between August and December 1983, Amnesty International documented the arrests and "disappearances" of over 600 people in the capital city alone. Relatives were told by Indonesian forces that the "disappeared" were sent to Bali.

Those suspected of opposing integration were often arrested and tortured. In 1983 Amnesty International published an Indonesian manual it had received from East Timor instructing military personnel on how to inflict physical and mental anguish, and cautioning troops to "Avoid taking photographs showing torture (of someone being given electric shocks, stripped naked and so on)". In his 1997 memoir East Timor's Unfinished Struggle: Inside the Timorese Resistance, Constâncio Pinto describes being tortured by Indonesian soldiers: "With each question, I would get two or three punches in the face. When someone punches you so much and so hard, it feels as if your face is broken. People hit me on my back and on my sides with their hands and then kicked me.... [In another location] they psychologically tortured me; they didn't hit me, but they made strong threats to kill me. They even put a gun on the table." In Michele Turner's book Telling East Timor: Personal Testimonies 1942–1992, a woman named Fátima describes watching torture take place in a Dili prison: "They make people sit on a chair with the front of the chair on their own toes. It is mad, yes. The soldiers urinate in the food then mix it up for the person to eat. They use electric shock and they use an electric machine...."

== Violence against women ==
Indonesian military abuses against women in East Timor were numerous and well-documented. In addition to suffering arbitrary detainment, torture, and extrajudicial execution, women faced rape and sexual abuse—sometimes for the crime of being related to an independence activist. The scope of the problem is difficult to ascertain, owing to the intense military control imposed during the occupation, compounded by the shame felt by victims. In a 1995 report on violence against women in Indonesia and East Timor, Amnesty International USA wrote: "Women are reluctant to pass on information to non-governmental organizations about rape and sexual abuse, let alone to report violations to the military or police authorities."

Other forms of violence against women took the form of harassment, intimidation, and forced marriage. The Amnesty report cites the case of a woman forced to live with a commander in Baucau, then harassed daily by troops after her release. Such "marriages" took place regularly during the occupation. Women were also encouraged to accept sterilisation procedures, and some were pressured to take the contraceptive Depo Provera, sometimes without full knowledge of its effects.

In 1999 researcher Rebecca Winters released the book Buibere: Voice of East Timorese Women, which chronicles many personal stories of violence and abuse dating to the earliest days of the occupation. One woman tells of being interrogated while stripped half-naked, tortured, molested, and threatened with death. Another describes being chained at the hands and feet, raped repeatedly, and interrogated for weeks. A woman who had prepared food for FRETILIN guerrillas was arrested, burned with cigarettes, tortured with electricity, and forced to walk naked past a row of soldiers into a tank filled with urine and feces.

== Santa Cruz massacre ==
During a memorial mass on 12 November 1991 for a pro-independence youth shot by Indonesian troops, demonstrators among the 2,500-strong crowd unfurled the Fretilin flag and banners with pro-independence slogans, and chanted boisterously but peacefully. Following a brief confrontation between Indonesian troops and protesters, 200 Indonesian soldiers opened fire on the crowd. Indonesia's armed forces fired on East Timorese demonstrators at the Santa Cruz cemetery in East Timor’s capital city of Dili, where the death toll of the massacre reached 271, with 250 missing and 382 wounded, immediately exposing the plights and struggles of the East Timor peoples to international media for the first time in the history of the struggle for self-determination.

The testimonies of foreigners at the cemetery were quickly reported to international news organisations, and video footage of the massacre was widely broadcast internationally causing outrage. In response to the massacre, activists around the world organised in solidarity with the East Timorese, and a new urgency was brought to calls for self-determination. TAPOL, a British organisation formed in 1973 to advocate for democracy in Indonesia, increased its work around East Timor. In the United States, the East Timor Action Network (now the East Timor and Indonesia Action Network) was founded and soon had chapters in ten cities around the country. Other solidarity groups appeared in Portugal, Australia, Japan, Germany, Ireland, The Netherlands, Malaysia and Brazil. Coverage of the massacre was a vivid example of how growth of new media in Indonesia was making it increasingly difficult for the "New Order" to control information flow in and out of Indonesia, and that in the post-Cold War 1990s, the government was coming under increasing international scrutiny. A number of pro-democracy student groups and their magazines began to openly and critically discuss not just East Timor, but also the "New Order" and the broader history and future of Indonesia.

Sharp condemnation of the military came not just from the international community, but from within parts of the Indonesian elite. The massacre ended the governments 1989 opening of the territory and a new period of repression began. Warouw was removed from his position and his more accommodating approach to Timorese resistance rebuked by his superiors. Suspected Fretilin sympathisers were arrested, human rights abuses rose, and the ban on foreign journalists was reimposed. Hatred intensified amongst Timorese of the Indonesian military presence. Major General Prabowo's, Kopassus Group 3 trained militias gangs dressed in black hoods to crush the remaining resistance.

== Number of deaths ==
Precise estimates of the death toll are difficult to determine. The 2005 report by the UN's Commission for Reception, Truth and Reconciliation in East Timor (CAVR) reports an estimated minimum number of conflict-related deaths of 102,800 (+/- 12,000). Of these, the report states that approximately 18,600 (+/-1,000) were either killed or disappeared, and it also states that approximately 84,000 (+/-11,000) died from hunger or illness in excess of what would have been expected due to peacetime mortality. These figures represent a minimum conservative estimate that CAVR says is its scientifically based principal finding. The report did not provide an upper bound, however, CAVR speculated that the total number of deaths due to conflict-related hunger and illness could have been as high as 183,000. The truth commission held Indonesian forces responsible for about 70% of the violent killings.

Researcher Ben Kiernan states that "a toll of 150,000 is likely close to the truth," although one can throw out an estimate of 200,000 or higher. The Center for Defense Information also estimated a total close to 150,000. A 1974 Catholic church estimate of the population of East Timor was 688,711 people; in 1982 the church reported only 425,000. This led to an estimate of 200,000 people killed during the occupation, which was widely reported around the world. Other sources such as Amnesty International and Human Rights Watch also support an estimate of over 200,000 killed.

According to specialist Gabriel Defert, on the basis of statistical data which was made available by the Portuguese and Indonesian authorities, and according to statistical data which was made available by the Catholic Church, between December 1975 and December 1981, approximately 308,000 Timorese lost their lives; this estimate constituted about 44% of the pre-invasion population. Similarly Indonesian Professor George Aditjondro, formerly of Salatiga University in Java, concluded from his study of Indonesian Army data that in fact 300,000 Timorese had been killed in the early years of the occupation.

Robert Cribb, a professor at the Australian National University, argues that the death toll was significantly exaggerated. He argues that the 1980 census counted 555,350 Timorese, but "the most reliable source of all," was probably a minimum rather than a maximum estimate for the total population. "It is worth recalling that hundreds of thousands of East Timorese disappeared during the violence of September 1999, only to reappear later," he writes. The 1980 census becomes more improbable in the face of the 1987 census that counted 657,411 Timorese—this would require a growth rate of 2.5% per year, nearly identical to the very high growth rate in East Timor from 1970 to 1975, and a highly unlikely one given the conditions of the brutal occupation, including Indonesian efforts to discourage reproduction. Noting the relative lack of personal accounts of atrocities or of traumatised Indonesian soldiers, he further adds that East Timor "does not appear—on the basis of news reports and academic accounts—to be a society traumatized by mass death...the circumstance leading up to the Dili massacre of 1991...indicate a society which retained its vigor and indignation in a way which would probably not have been possible if it had been treated as Cambodia was treated under Pol Pot." Even Indonesian military strategy was based on winning the "hearts and minds" of the population, a fact that does not support charges of mass killing.

Kiernan, starting from a base population of 700,000 Timorese in 1975 (based on the 1974 Catholic Church census) calculated an expected 1980 population of 735,000 Timorese (assuming a growth rate of only 1% per year as a result of the occupation). Accepting the 1980 count that Cribb regards as at least 10% (55,000) too low, Kiernan concluded that as many as 180,000 may have died in the war. Cribb argued that the 3% growth rate suggested by the 1974 census was too high, citing the fact that the church had previously postulated a growth rate of 1.8%, which would have produced a figure in line with the Portuguese population estimate of 635,000 for 1974.

Although Cribb maintained that the Portuguese census was almost certainly an underestimate, he believed that it was more accurate than the church's census, due to the fact that the church's attempt to extrapolate the size of the total population "must be seen in light of its incomplete access to society" (less than half of Timorese were Catholic). Assuming a growth rate in line with the other nations of South East Asia, then, would yield a more accurate figure of 680,000 for 1975, and an expected 1980 population of slightly over 775,000 (without accounting for the decline in the birth rate resulting from the Indonesian occupation). The deficit remaining would be almost exactly 200,000. According to Cribb, Indonesian policies restricted the birth rate by up to 50% or more, thus around 45,000 of these were not born rather than killed; another 55,000 were "missing" as a result of the Timorese evading the Indonesian authorities who conducted the 1980 census. A variety of factors—the exodus of tens of thousands from their homes to escape FRETILIN in 1974–75; the deaths of thousands in the civil war; the deaths of combatants during the occupation; killings by FRETILIN; and natural disasters—diminish further still the civilian toll attributable to Indonesian forces during this time. Considering all this data, Cribb argues for a much lower toll of 100,000 or less, with an absolute minimum of 60,000, and a mere tenth of the civilian population dying unnaturally, for the years 1975–1980.

However, Kiernan responded by asserting that the influx of migrant workers during the occupation and the increase in the population's growth rate which is typical during a mortality crisis justifies the belief that the 1980 census is valid despite the 1987 estimate, and the church's 1974 census—though a "possible maximum"—cannot be discounted because the church's lack of access to society might well have resulted in an undercounting. He concluded that at least 116,000 combatants and civilians were killed by all sides or died "unnatural" deaths from 1975 to 1980 (if true, this would yield the result that about 15% of the civilian population of East Timor was killed from 1975 to 1980). F. Hiorth separately estimated that 13% (95,000 out of an expected 730,000 when accounting for the reduction in birth rates) of the civilian population died during this period. Kiernan believes that the deficit was most probably around 145,000 when accounting for the reduction in birth rates, or 20% of East Timor's population. The mid-value of the UN report is 146,000 deaths; R.J. Rummel, an analyst of political killings, estimates 150,000.

Accurate numbers of Indonesian casualties are well-documented. The complete names of around 2,300 Indonesian soldiers and members of pro-Indonesian militias who died in action as well as from illness and accidents during the entire occupation is engraved into the Seroja Monument, located in the TNI's Headquarters in Cilangkap, East Jakarta.

== Classification as a genocide ==
Many observers have classified the Indonesian military's actions in East Timor as a genocide. Oxford held an academic consensus in which the event was classified as a genocide and Yale University educates people about the event as a part of its "Genocide Studies" program. In a study of the word's legal meaning and the applicability of it to the Indonesian occupation of East Timor, legal scholar Ben Saul concludes that because no group which is recognized under international law was targeted by the Indonesian authorities, a charge of genocide cannot be applied. However, he also notes: "The conflict in East Timor most accurately qualifies as genocide against a 'political group', or alternatively as 'cultural genocide', yet neither of these concepts are explicitly recognised in international law." A similar argument was made by David Lisson, who argues that the conflict would have been classified as a genocide if the East Timorese had been able to form their own nation state prior to the invasion, yet because the Indonesian invasion deliberately pre-empted this from occurring, it paradoxically created a loophole that technically excludes the Indonesian military's actions from the charge of genocide. The Indonesian occupation of East Timor has been compared to the Cambodian genocide (the killings which were committed by the Khmer Rouge), the Yugoslav wars, and the Rwandan genocide.

== Depictions in fiction ==
- Balibo (2009)
- Amok (novel) (Barry Eisler, 2022)

== See also ==
- Genocides in history (1946 to 1999)#East Timor
- History of East Timor
- History of Indonesia
- Human rights in Indonesia
- Indonesian mass killings of 1965–66
- List of massacres in Timor-Leste
- Papua conflict
- Politics of Indonesia
- United States atrocity crimes
