= Maliana Administrative Post =

Administrative post in Bobonaro Municipality, Timor-Leste

Maliana
- Administrative Post
- Posto Administrativo de Maliana (Portuguese); Postu administrativu Maliana (Tetum)
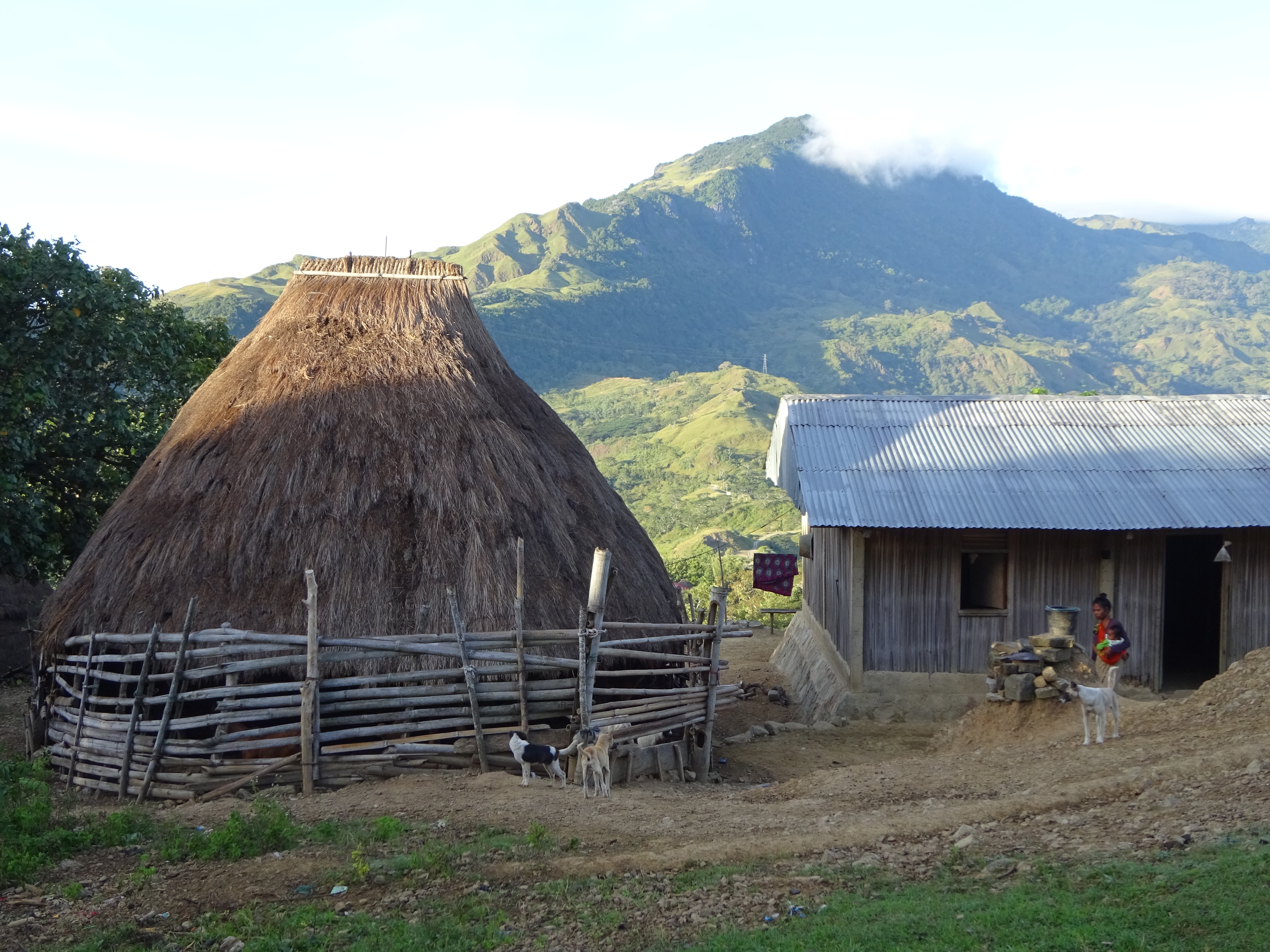
- Huts in Ritabou with Mt Leolaco behind

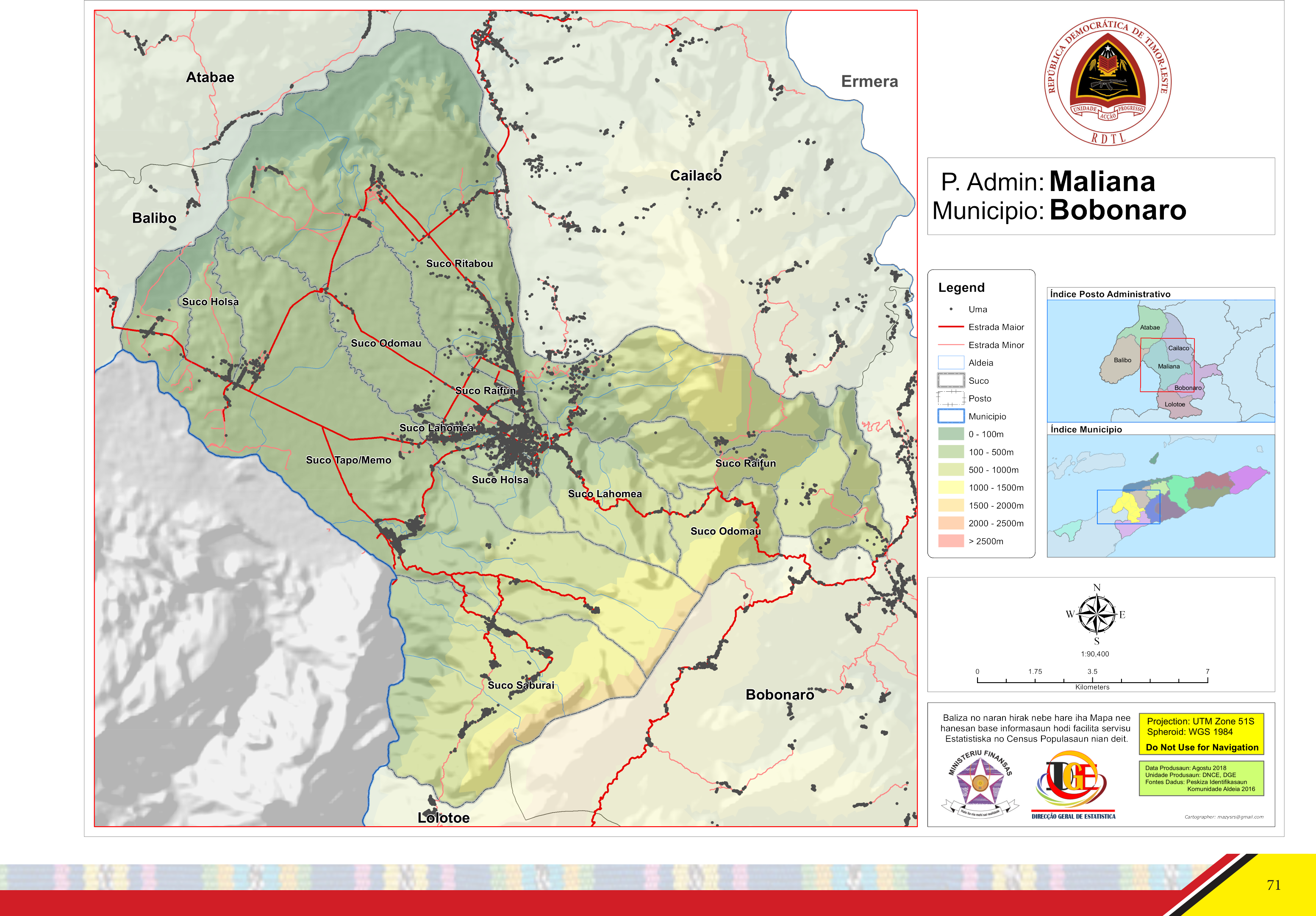
- Official map

- Location within East Timor
- Coordinates: 9°0′S 125°13′E
- Country: Timor-Leste
- Municipality: Bobonaro
- Seat: Holsa
- Sucos: Holsa; Lahomea; Odomau; Raifun; Ritabou; Saburai; Tapo/Memo

Area
  - Total: 237.0 km^{2} (91.5 sq mi)

Population (2015 census)
  - Total: 28,908
  - Density: 122.0/km^{2} (315.9/sq mi)

Households (2015 census)
  - Total: 4,942
- Time zone: UTC+09:00 (TLT)

Maliana, officially Maliana Administrative Post (Portuguese: Posto Administrativo de Maliana, Tetum: Postu administrativu Maliana), is an administrative post (and was formerly a subdistrict) in Bobonaro municipality, Timor-Leste. Its seat or administrative centre is Holsa.
