= Lospalos case =

Series of mass killings during the 1999 East Timorese crisis

Lospalos massacre
- Part of the 1999 East Timorese crisis
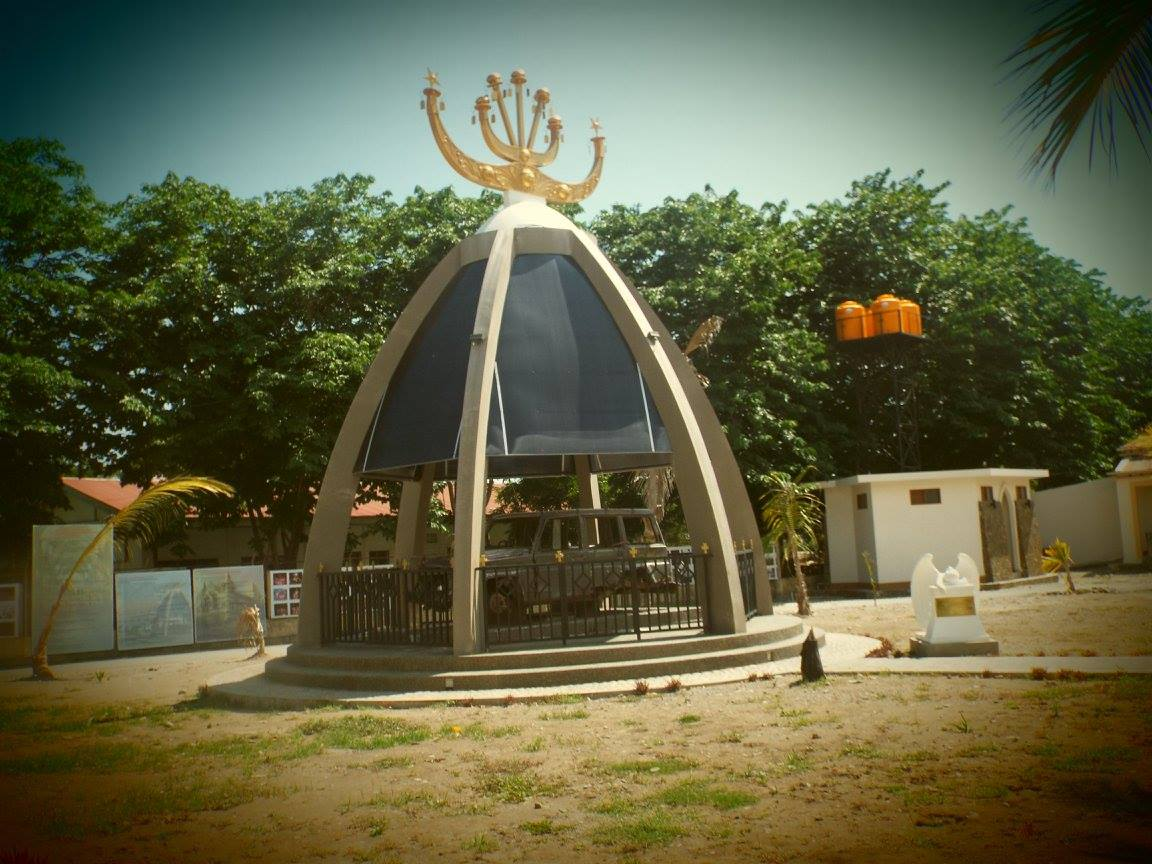
- The car of the nine people killed at the bank of the Malailada River in September 1999
- Location: Lautém Municipality, East Timor
- Date: April – September 1999
- Target: East Timorese civilians and independence supporters
- Attack type: Mass killings and enforced disappearances
- Deaths: 46+
- Perpetrators: Indonesian Army and several Pro-Indonesia militias
- Motive: Anti-Catholic sentiment and genocidal intent

The Lospalos case or also known as the Lospalos massacre and the Lautém massacre, refers to the series of killings committed by the Indonesian Army and Pro-Indonesian militias from around April to September 1999 during the 1999 East Timorese Crisis, in the area in and around Lospalos, Lautém.

== Background ==
Sometime in January, a clandestine member, Rosa Maria was killed by Team Alfa members as she hid in a forest in Lautém.

== Events ==
On 21 April, Pro-Indonesian militants tortured and stabbed to death a Falintil member Evaristo Lopes. That same day Virgilio de Sousa was stabbed to death at his home in Somoco. Two days later a former Falintil member, Lamberto da Silva was killed by Indonesian soldiers at Panili Cacaven hill in Cacaven.

Sometime in September, nine people, Afonso dos Santos, Nberto da Luz, Nato, Joao, Sikito, Olantino, Jaime, Marito, Serpa Pinto and Francisco dos Santos disappeared after being detained by Indonesian soldiers in Fuiloro.

On 9 September Indonesian soldiers killed a man named Mateus Nunes at their military post in Cacaven, they then cut Nunes' throat and threw his body in a well.

From 8 to 10 September five men Antonio da Costa, Ambrosio Bernardino Alves, Julio de Jesus, Florencio Monteiro and Florentino Monteiro were summarily executed by Indonesian soldiers while in custody in Fuiloro.

From 10 to 13 September five men Joaquim Ovi Marais, Antonio Oliveira, Marito Bernardino, Paul and Serafim were killed by Indonesian soldiers in Raça.

Around 13 September, Martinho Branco, Marcelio Jeronimo, Julião de Azis and Helder de Azis were detained and then killed by Indonesian soldiers in Fuiloro.

On 20 Indonesian soldiers tortured and beat to death Agusto Soares and João Gomes on a beach in Parlamento, another man Amilcar Barros was killed as well. The next day Team Alfa members murdered two men, Afredo Araújo and Calisto Rodrigues. That same day in Com, João Viela was killed, another man Benedito Marques Cabral was also killed nearby.

On 25 September Indonesian soldiers and members of Team Alfa shot dead nine people on the bank of the Malailada (Veromoco) River, killing nuns Erminia Cazzaniga and Maria Celeste de Carvalho Pinto, a priest Jacinto Francisco Xavier, seminarians Titi Sandora Cornelio Lopes and Valerio Pereira de Conceição, a nurse Dora, a church employee Fernando dos Santos, a teenage altar boy Cristovão Rudy Freitas Barato and an Indonesian journalist Agus Muliawan.

== See also ==
- Kraras massacre
