= Time in Timor-Leste =

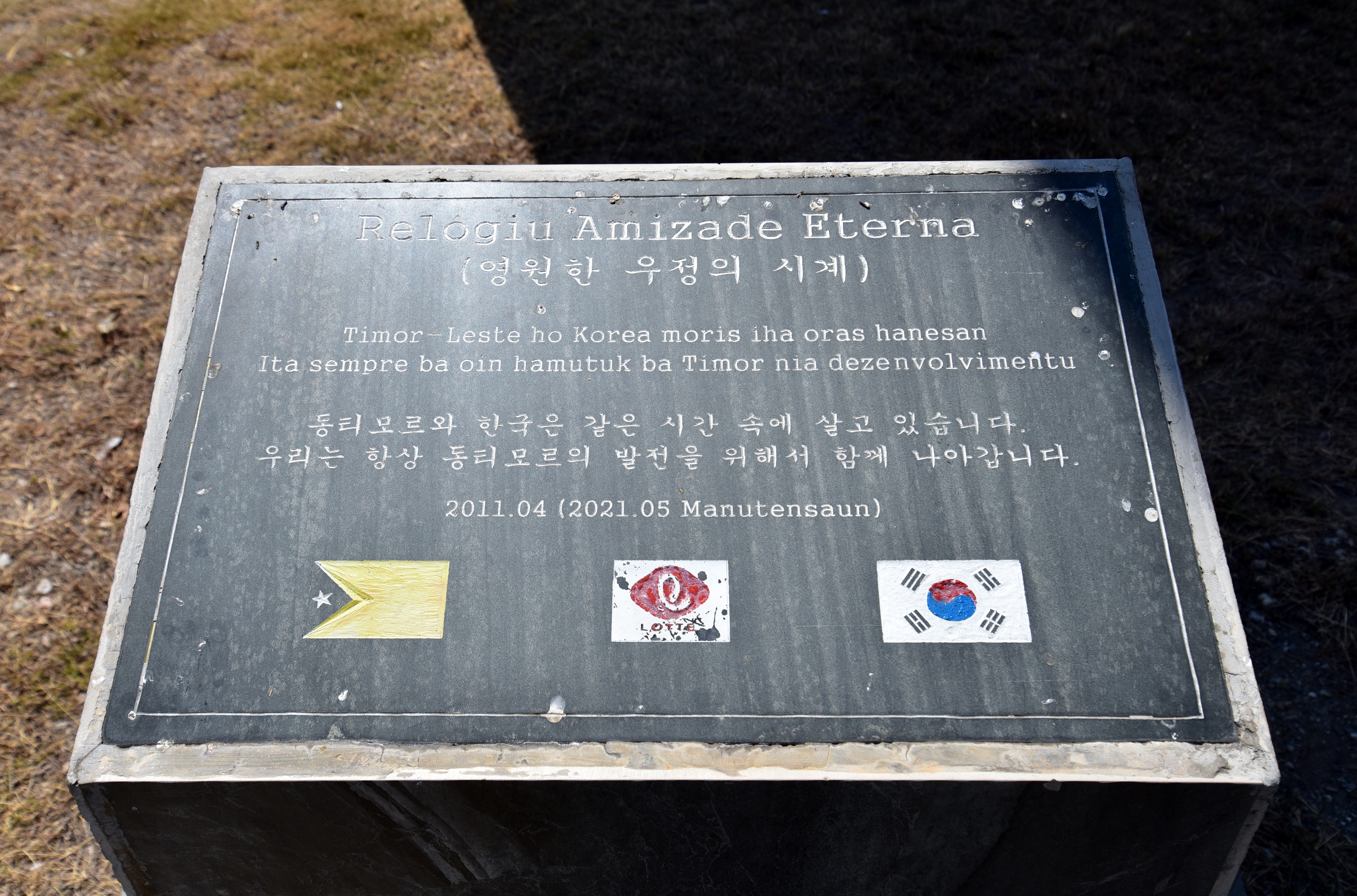
Plaque on the Eternal Friendship Clock in Dili, a gift from the South Korean state; it notes that both countries are in the same time zone.

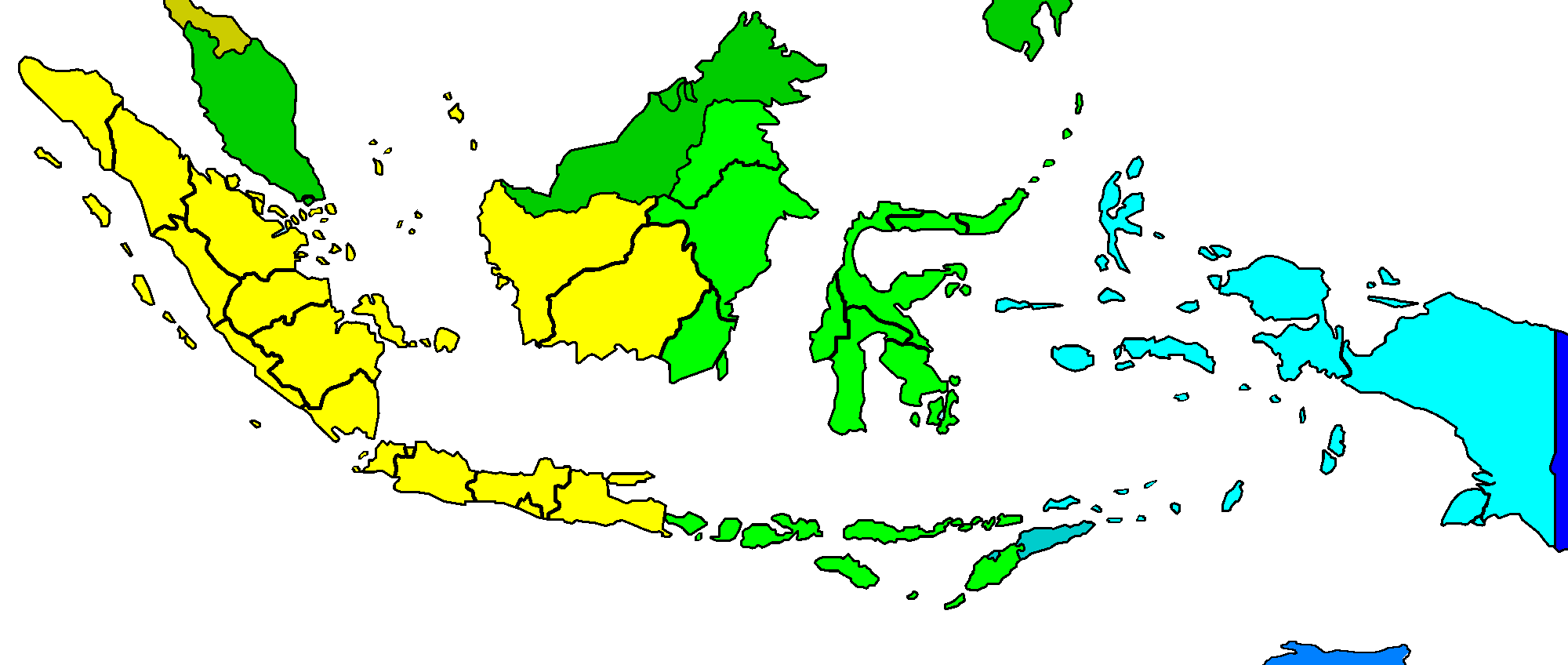
Time zones in Indonesia and nearby countries; Timor-Leste is visible at lower right.

Timor-Leste uses UTC+09:00. In the west, the country borders the UTC+08:00 zone of Central Indonesia, and in the east, the UTC+09:00 zone of Eastern Indonesia. Daylight saving time has never observed in Timor-Leste. Timor-Leste shares the same time zone with Japan Standard Time, Korean Standard Time, Pyongyang Time (North Korea), Eastern Indonesia Standard Time, Palau Time, and Yakutsk Time (Russia).

== IANA time zone database ==
The IANA time zone database contains one zone for Timor-Leste in the file zone.tab, which is named Asia/Dili.
