= List of massacres in Indonesia =

The following article is a list of massacres that have occurred in Indonesia.

== Colonial Indonesia ==
Name	Date	Location	Deaths	Notes
Banda massacre	7 March – late 1621	Lontor, Maluku	2,500–2,800	Genocidal massacre of the Banda people by the Dutch East India Company (VOC) under Jan Pieterszoon Coen during the Dutch conquest of the Banda Islands.
Massacre of ulema by Amangkurat I	1648	Sultanate of Mataram	5,000–6,000	Around 5,000–6,000 ulemas and their family members were slain within less than thirty minutes. This massacre was ordered by Sultan Amangkurat I in order to exact revenge, since two days before his own younger brother Prince Alit tried to overthrow him
1740 Batavia massacre	9 October – 22 November 1740	Jakarta	10,000+	Pogrom of the Chinese community of Batavia by the VOC under Governor-General Adriaan Valckenier.
Kuta Reh massacre	14 June 1904	Kuta Rih, Aceh	561	Massacre of the inhabitants of Kuta Reh by the Korps Marechaussee te voet of the Royal Netherlands East Indies Army (KNIL) under General Gotfried Coenraad Ernst van Daalen during the Aceh War.
1918 Kudus riot	31 October 1918	Kudus, Central Java	c. 10	Pogrom of the Chinese community of Kudus by Javanese residents.
1942 Qantas Short Empire shootdown	30 January 1942	Timor Sea off West Timor	13	The Corio, a Short Empire flying boat airliner, operated by Qantas, was shot down by Imperial Japanese Naval Air Service aircraft in the early days of the Pacific War during World War II off the coast of West Timor, Thirteen occupants were killed. Captain Aubrey Koch, along with another crewman and three passengers, swam to shore and were rescued.
Laha massacre	February 1942	Ambon, Maluku	309	Massacre of Australian and Dutch prisoners of war (POWs) by the Imperial Japanese Army (IJA) under General Takeo Itō during the Dutch East Indies campaign.
Bangka Island massacre	16 February 1942	Bangka, Bangka Belitung Islands	82	Massacre of Australian and British nurses and POWs by the IJA following the Fall of Singapore.
Balikpapan massacre	24 February 1942	Balikpapan, East Kalimantan	78	Massacre of Dutch civilians and POWs by the 56th Division of the IJA during the Dutch East Indies campaign.
Pig-basket atrocity	1942–1943	Throughout the Indonesian Archipelago	Unknown	Killings of Allied POWs by the Japanese Kempeitai and the IJA under General Hitoshi Imamura during the Japanese occupation of the Dutch East Indies.
Pontianak incidents	1943–1944	Kalimantan	20,000+	Massacres of various Borneo demographies, in particular local ethnic Malay elites, by the Imperial Japanese Navy during the Japanese occupation of the Dutch East Indies.
Bersiap killings	August 1945 – November 1947	Throughout the Indonesian Archipelago	3,500–30,000	Revolutionary and intercommunal killings of Chinese, Europeans, Indos, Japanese, Minahasans, Moluccans, and other demographies by (fellow) native Indonesians during the Indonesian National Revolution; in particular between the surrender of Japan in August 1945 and the arrival of the Dutch military in March 1946.
Bulu prison massacre	August 1945	Semarang, Central Java	200+	Massacre of Japanese POWs by Indonesian revolutionaries during the Indonesian National Revolution. In response, over 2,500 Indonesians were massacred by the Japanese.
South Sulawesi campaign	10 December 1946 – 21 February 1947	South Sulawesi	4,600–5,000	Killings of Sulawesi civilians during the Indonesian National Revolution; 3,100–3,500 people killed by troops of the KNIL and the Korps Speciale Troepen (KST) under Captain Raymond Westerling, and approximately 1,500 people killed by Indonesian revolutionaries.
1947 Yogyakarta Dakota incident	29 July 1947	Ngoto, Bantul	8	A Douglas C-47 Skytrain carrying medical supplies to the national government of Indonesia, was shot down over Ngoto, Bantul with only one survivor of the nine aboard. The Dutch initially denied complicity but would eventually pay restitution.
Mergosono massacre	31 July 1947	Malang, East Java	30	Pogrom of the Chinese community of Mergosono by Indonesian revolutionaries during the Indonesian National Revolution.
Rawagede massacre	9 December 1947	Balongsari, West Java	431	Massacre of the inhabitants of Rawegede by KNIL troops under Major Alphons Wijnen during the Indonesian National Revolution.
Rengat massacre	5 January 1949	Rengat, Riau	400–2,600	Massacre of the inhabitants of Rengat by KST troops under Lieutenant Rudy de Mey during the Indonesian National Revolution.

== Post-independence ==
Name	Date	Location	Deaths	Notes
Kashmir Princess bombing	11 April 1955	Off the Natuna Islands	16	The Air India Kasmir Princess (Lockheed Constellation) crashed into the sea near the Natuna Islands following a bomb explosion that killed 16 people. The aircraft was chartered by the government of the People's Republic of China to transport an official delegation to the Bandung Conference in Bandung. Possible suspects include a Kuomintang secret agent who used a bomb on the aircraft during its transit in Hong Kong, in an attempt to assassinate Zhou Enlai, who missed the flight.
Cikini Incident	30 November 1957	Cikini, Menteng, Central Jakarta, Jakarta	10	10 killed and 48-100 injured in a grenade attack on President Sukarno
Indonesian mass killings of 1965–66	1965 October – 1966 March	Throughout Indonesia	500,000–1,000,000+	Massacre of the members of the Communist Party of Indonesia (PKI) and alleged communist sympathizers in revenge for the 30 September Movement.
East Timor genocide	1975–1999	East Timor (then under Indonesian occupation as the East Timor Province)	100,000–300,000	Indonesian genocidal massacre and state terrorism against the population of East Timor, from the Indonesian invasion of East Timor in 1975–79 until the formation of the United Nations Transitional Administration in East Timor in 1999.
Malari incident	15–16 January 1974	Jakarta	11	Student protests against New Order government corruption, high prices, and financial inequality turn into violent riots and a pogrom of the Chinese community of Glodok.
Southern Jayapura bombings	28 July 1977	Jayapura Regency	1,605	Aerial bombardment of several villages in the southern Jayapura Regency by the Indonesian Air Force.
Baliem Valley campaign	1977–1978	Baliem Valley	4,146–26,000+	Series of aerial bombings and mass killings by the Indonesian Armed Forces in and around the Baliem Valley.
Petrus killings	1983 and 1985	Throughout Indonesia	300 to 10,000	Extrajudicial executions of thousands of criminals and other offenders (including alleged political dissents) by undercover Indonesian Army, death squads, and secret police forces.
Kraras massacre	August–September 1983	Kraras, East Timor (then under Indonesian occupation as the East Timor Province)	200+	Massacre of the inhabitants of Kraras by the Indonesian Army in collaboration with local Hansip during the Indonesian occupation of East Timor.
Tanjung Priok massacre	12 September 1984	Jakarta	24–100+	Killings of Muslim residents of Tanjung Priok by the Indonesian military, who had been protesting earlier arrests of mosque caretakers.
Banyuwangi massacre	15 April 1987	Banjarsari and Boyolangu village, Banyuwangi	21 (including the perpetrator)	Mass stabbing attack in two villages by a farmer who committed suicide following a manhunt.
Talangsari incident	7 February 1989	Talangsari village, East Lampung	27–130 or 300	Islamist civilians were massacred by Indonesian Army troops
1990–1998 Indonesian military operations in Aceh	early 1990 – 22 August 1998	Aceh	9.000—12.000	During that period, the Indonesian army practiced large-scale and systematic human rights abuses against the Acehnese. The war was characterised as a "dirty war" involving arbitrary executions, kidnapping, torture, mass rape, disappearances, and the torching of villages. Amnesty International called the military operations response as a "shock therapy" for GAM. Villages that were suspected of harboring GAM operatives were burnt down and family members of suspected militants were kidnapped and tortured. Between 9,000 and 12,000 people, mostly civilians, were killed between 1989 and 1998 in the operation.
Santa Cruz massacre	12 November 1991	Dili, East Timor (then under Indonesian occupation as the East Timor Province)	250+	Killings of East Timorese pro-independence demonstrators by the Indonesian Army during the Indonesian occupation of East Timor
Nipah Dam incident	25 September 1993	Banyuates, Sampang, Madura Island, East Java	4	Security forces fired on a group of villagers protesting the construction of Nipah Dam in Sampang Regency. Four villagers were killed
Kingmi Church massacre	31 May 1995	Hoya, Central Papua	11	Killings of Papuan refugees on their way to mass at the Kingmi Protestant Church near Hoya, by the Indonesian Army during the Papua conflict.
Timika shooting	15 April 1996	Timika, Central Papua	16	Mass shooting of five Kopassus officers, six Indonesian military officials, and five civilians by Kopassus Second Lieutenant Sanurip at the Mozes Kilangin Airport.
Banjarmasin riot	23 May 1997	Banjarmasin, South Kalimantan	137+	Attacks against Golkar supporters, local Chinese and Christians, and businesses by supporters of the United Development Party in the run-up to the 1997 Indonesian legislative election.
East Java ninja killings	1998	Banyuwangi, Jember, and Malang, East Java	143	A witchhunt against alleged sorcerers spiraled into widespread riots and violence. In addition to alleged sorcerers, Islamic clerics were also targeted and killed, Nahdlatul Ulama members were murdered by rioters.
May 1998 Indonesia riots	4–8 and 12–15 May 1998	Jakarta, Medan, Surakarta, and elsewhere	5,000	There were dozens of documented accounts of ethnic Chinese women being raped. Other sources note that over 1,500 people were killed and over 468 (168 victims in Jakarta alone) were mass gang-raped in the riots. It is estimated that possibly 5,000 died.
Trisakti shootings	12 May 1998	Trisakti University, Jakarta	4	At a demonstration demanding President Suharto's resignation, Indonesian Army soldiers opened fire on unarmed protestors in Trisakti University. Four students were killed and 15 were injured.
Biak massacre	2–6 July 1998	Biak, Papua	40–150	Massacre of Papuan pro-independence demonstrators of the Free Papua Movement by Indonesian military and police forces during the Papuan conflict.
Sambas riots	1999	Sambas, West Kalimantan	3,000	Malays and Dayaks joined to massacre the Madurese. Madurese were mutilated and killed with 3,000 of them died in the massacres, and the Indonesian government doing little to stop the violence.
Idi Cut Tragedy	3 February 1999	Idi Cut , East Aceh	7	Soldiers opened fire on a crowd of residents returning home after attending a large religious gathering in the early morning hours.
Lospalos case	April–September 1999	Lautém, East Timor (then under Indonesian occupation as the East Timor Province)	46+	Series of killings and forced disappearances by the Indonesian army and Pro-Indonesian militias
Liquiçá Church massacre	6 April 1999	Liquiçá, East Timor (then under Indonesian occupation as the East Timor Province)	c. 200	Massacre of East Timorese Catholics by pro-Indonesia militias, mainly Besi Merah Putih, during the Indonesian occupation of East Timor.
Manuel Carrascalão House massacre	17 April 1999	Dili, East Timor (then under Indonesian occupation as the East Timor Province)	14	Killings of East Timorese pro-independence figures by the pro-Indonesia Aitarak militia under Eurico Guterres during the Indonesian occupation of East Timor. Guterres has led the Indonesian Laskar Merah Putih militia in Indonesian New Guinea since August 2003.
Simpang KKA massacre	3 May 1999	North Aceh, Aceh	c. 46	This incident occurred during the Aceh conflict on 3 May 1999, in Dewantara, North Aceh. At the time, Indonesian military forces opened fire on a crowd of protesters protesting the assault on civilians that occurred on April 30 in Cot Murong, Lhokseumawe.
Beutong Ateueh massacre	23 July 1999	Nagan Raya, Aceh	56	The massacre took place at the Teungku Bantaqiah Islamic study hall by more than 100 Indonesian Army personnel under the operational control (BKO) of Korem 011/Lilawangsa, consisting of troops from Yonif 131 and 133, supported by a platoon of troops from Battalion 328 Kostrad. The students and their leader were accused of being Gerakan Aceh Merdeka (GAM) sympathizers.
Suai Church massacre	6 September 1999	Suai, East Timor (then under Indonesian occupation as the East Timor Province)	c. 200	Massacre of East Timorese Catholics by the Indonesian Army, police, and the pro-Indonesia Laksaur militia during the Indonesian occupation of East Timor.
Walisongo school massacre	28 May 2000	Poso, Central Sulawesi	191–200	Massacre of Muslim residents in villages around Poso city by radical Christian militants during the Poso riots as part of the sectarian conflict between Muslims and Christians in Central Sulawesi.
Atambua UNHCR office attack	6 September 2000	Atambua, West Timor	3–5	Angered residents and pro-Indonesian militiamen stormed the UNHCR office in Atambua. The mob then killed three foreign UN aid workers who were shot and hacked to death, two Indonesians were also supposedly killed in the riot.
Jakarta Stock Exchange bombing	14 September 2000	Jakarta	15	A car bomb exploded in the basement of the Jakarta Stock Exchange, triggering a chain of explosions in which a number of cars caught fire. Most of the dead were drivers waiting by their employer's cars.
Christmas Eve Indonesia bombings	24 December 2000	Medan, Bandung, Batam, Ciamis, Mataram, Mojokerto, and Pekanbaru	18	Series of coordinated bombings of churches in Jakarta and eight other cities which killed 18 people and injured many others.
Sampit conflict	18–28 February 2001	Sampit, Central Kalimantan	500	Massacre of Madurese migrants by Dayak natives, with violence later spreading throughout Central Kalimantan.
Bumi Flora massacre	9 August 2001	Julok, East Aceh, Aceh	c. 31	Dozens of TNI soldiers opened fire against workers of PT Bumi Flora, a rubber and palm oil plantation in East Aceh, killing 31 people, 7 injured and 1 missing.
Poso bus attacks	5 June – 8 August 2002	Poso, Central Sulawesi	7	Bombings and a shooting targeting public transport in Poso, Central Sulawesi by radical Islamic militants as part of the sectarian conflict between Muslims and Christians in Central Sulawesi.
2002 Bali bombings	12 October 2002	Kuta, Bali	204 (including both bombers)	Coordinated bomb attacks occurred on in the tourist district of Kuta, Bali. The attack was the deadliest act of terrorism in the history of Indonesia, killing 202 people, including 88 Australian citizens and 38 Indonesian citizens. A further 209 people were injured. Various members of Jemaah Islamiyah, a violent Islamist group, were convicted in relation to the bombings, including three individuals who were sentenced to death.
Wamena incident	4 April 2003	Around Wamena, Jayawijaya, Papua	53	Following a raid on an Indonesian military armory which killed 2 soldiers, around 7,000 civilians were forcefully relocated and around 50 died.
Jambo Keupok massacre	17 May 2003	South Aceh, Aceh	16+	A total of 16+ civilians died innocently after experiencing torture, shooting, extrajudicial killings, and burning, and 5 other people also experienced violence by members of the Indonesian National Army, Para Commandos (PARAKO) and the Joint Intelligence Unit (SGI).
Marriott Hotel bombing	5 August 2003	Jakarta	13	Suicide car bombing of the Marriott hotel.
Aceh New Year's Eve bombing	31 December 2003	Peureulak, Aceh	10	A New Year's Eve concert in Aceh were bombed by suspected separatists.
Australian Embassy bombing in Jakarta	9 September 2004	Jakarta	11 (including the perpetrator)	A one-tonne car bomb, which was packed into a small delivery van, exploded outside the Australian embassy at Kuningan District, South Jakarta, at about 10:30 local time (03:30 UTC), killing 11 people including the suicide bomber, and wounding over 150 others. Jemaah Islamiyah claimed responsibility for the attack.
Poso bus bombing	13 November 2004	Poso, Central Sulawesi	6	A bomb exploded on a minibus carrying Christians.
Tentena market bombings	28 May 2005	Tentena, Central Sulawesi	22	Two bombs were detonated at an open air market frequented by Christians.
Amahai killings	9 June 2005	Rutah River, Amahai, Maluku	2	Seven Nuaulu people from Nuanea hamlet in Sepa village, Amahai district were involved in killing two residents of Rutah village in Amahai district. The murder took place in the Rutah River at around 21.00 WIT, the heads of both victims were cut off, while other body parts were cut into pieces as a requirement for the traditional procession.
2005 Bali bombings	1 October 2005	Bali	23 (including 3 perpetrators)	Three suicide car bombings target a resort and Kuta town square, places popular with western tourists.
Palu market bombing	31 December 2005	Palu, Central Sulawesi	8	A butcher's shop that was frequented by Christians and sold non-Halal food was bombed.
2009 Jakarta bombings	17 July 2009	Jakarta	9	9 people killed following the bombing of the JW Marriott Hotel and Ritz-Carlton.
Tarakan riot	27–29 September 2010	Tarakan, North Kalimantan	4	A violent riot between native Tidung and migrant Bugis following the fatal mugging of a Tidung elder by Buginese youths; further escalation is avoided through a government-mediated peace agreement between the communities.
South Lampung riots	27–29 October 2012	South Lampung, Lampung	14	The riots began when two girls from Agom village, a native Lampung people, fell in Balinuraga village, which is inhabited by Balinese transmigrants. It is suspected that both of them experienced harassment by Balinuraga villagers, causing Agom villagers to go berserk and attack the Balinese people.
Bloody Paniai case	8 December 2014	Paniai, Central Papua	5	Killings of civilians protesting military misconduct by the Indonesian Army during the Papua conflict.
2016 Jakarta attacks	14 January 2016	Jakarta	8	Several explosions followed by gunfire occurred with a Starbucks and a police station appearing to be the main targets. The attack involved seven participants.
Mako Brimob standoff	8–10 May 2018	Depok, West Java	8	Five police officers and one militant were killed and four others injured in a standoff between security forces and terrorists in a detention center. Hours after the end of the siege, an Islamic militant fatally stabbed a policeman at the police detention center before he was shot by another policeman.
Surabaya bombings	13–14 May 2018	Surabaya and Sidoarjo	15	A series of terrorist attacks. The attacks killed 15 civilians, mostly churchgoers, and injured 57 others. 13 perpetrators also died as a result of the bombings.
Nduga massacre	1 December 2018	Nduga, Highland Papua	20	Massacre of 19 non-Papuan civilian workers and 1 Indonesian Army soldier by West Papua National Liberation Army fighters under Egianus Kogoya during the Papua conflict.
2019 Papua protests	19 August – 23 September 2019	Throughout Indonesian New Guinea	31–33	Papuan protests throughout western New Guinea, fueled by an incident of racism in Surabaya and the ongoing Papua conflict, resulted in 5–7 civilian deaths in clashes in Deiyai Regency and 26 deaths from looting in Wamena and Jayapura.
2019 Indonesian protests and riots	23 September – 28 October 2019	Throughout Indonesia	5	Mass protests by students in major Indonesian cities against new government legislation, resulting in the deaths of 3 protesters in Jakarta and 2 others in the Bloody September incident in Kendari, Southeast Sulawesi.
Ilaga killings	20 November 2020	Ilaga, Central Papua	4	Killings of Papuan civilians by the Indonesian Army near Ilaga, two youths were shot one dying and the other only suffering injures, around an hour later one teen, one child and a civil servant were executed, during the Papua conflict.
Sigi attack	27 November 2020	Lembantongoa, Palolo, Sigi, Central Sulawesi	4	Murder of a Christian family by the terrorist group East Indonesia Mujahideen. Seven houses, including a house usually used as a place of worship for Christians, were burned.
KM 50 incident	7 December 2020	Rest Area KM 50, Karawang, West Java	6	Three Indonesian police officers carried out an attack at kilometer 50 of the Cikampek toll road, killing six FPI members. This was marked by the sudden shutdown of CCTV footage near the scene.
Bilogai Hospital incident	16 February 2021	Bilogai, Papua	3	Torture and killing of three brothers by the Indonesian Army while two brothers were visiting their injured brother after he was shot during rioting, during the Papua conflict.
Kalimango killings	11 May 2021	Napu Valley, Poso, Central Sulawesi	4	Four farmers were killed by East Indonesia Mujahideen, The attack was said to be a revenge for the killing of two members of the group, including Santoso's son, two months prior.
Nipuralome killings	4 June 2021	Nipuralome, Central Papua	3	the killings of Papuan civilians in Nipuralome village, where a man (village chief) and his wife were killed as well as another man being killed, during the Papua conflict. Beny Wenda accused the perpetrator to be the TNI and Polri. However the Cendrawasih Commands spokesperson claimed the perpetrators to be members of the separatist movement who attacked the Aminggaru Airport. On 27 May 2022, one of the perpetrators, Lerinus Murib, member of Bumunggur and Titus Murib of TPNPB Kodap III was shot dead by Damai Cartenz Task Force.
Yahukimo riots	4 October 2021	Yahukimo, Highland Papua	6	Violent clash ensued following the death of former regent of Yahukimo Regency, Abock Busup. The riot killed 6 while 41 people were injured. At least 52 rioters were arrested.
Kiwirok bombings	10–24 October 2021	Bintang Mountains, Highland Papua	50–297	Series of aerial bombardments carried out by the Indonesian National Armed Forces (TNI) against civilians in the Kiwirok district, Bintang Mountains, Highland Papua.
Haruku Island riot	25–27 January 2022	Haruku Island, Maluku	3	A customary land dispute between two villages leads to a violent riot; local leaders deny religious conflict, despite different religions between the communities.
Telkomsel BTS tower shooting	2 March 2022	Beoga, Central Papua	8	Killings of civilian workers at a Telkomsel telecommunications facility by West Papua Liberation Organization fighters during the Papua conflict.
Nogolait shooting	16 July 2022	Nogolait, Highland Papua	11	Killings of non-Papuan and Papuan residents of Nogolait by West Papua National Liberation Army fighters under Army Tabuni, Egianus Kogoya, and Yotam Bugiangge during the Papua conflict.
Timika killings	22 August 2022	Timika, West Papua	4	Killings of alleged OPM members by the Indonesian Army, who were attempting to buy weapons from the soldiers; they were shot, dismembered and their bodies stuffed in sacks and thrown in the Pigapu River, during the Papua conflict.
Kanjuruhan Stadium disaster	1 October 2022	Malang Regency, East Java	131	Killings caused by tear gas being thrown at the football supporters by the riot police after the pitch invasion.
Southeast Maluku riot	6 October – 12 November 2022	Kai Besar, Maluku	2	A customary land dispute between two Catholic Kei villages and a Muslim Banda village leads to a violent riot; religious conflict is denied by local leadership.
2023 Wamena riot	23 February 2023	Wamena, Highland Papua	12	A violent riot between Papuan residents of Sinakma, Wamena and Indonesian security personnel following the arrests of two Batak merchants on suspicion of child kidnapping during the 2023 Indonesian child abduction scare.
Brazza River killings	14 September 2023	Brazza River, Papua	5	During clashes in the Dekai district, members of Yotam Bugiangge KKB group, Wosak Battalion, part of Kodap Nduga-Darakma under Egianus Kogoya were killed by the Indonesian Army near the Brazza River after fleeing from Nduga.
Yahukimo massacre (2023)	16 October 2023	Seradala District, Yahukimo Regency, Highland Papua	13	The attack, carried out by a group of West Papuan separatist militants under the name West Papua National Liberation Army, killed 13 civilian gold miners
Jagakarsa child killings	6 December 2023 (bodies found)	Jagakarsa, Jakarta	4	A father of four children Panca Darmansyah (41) beats his wife to the extent that she had to be hospitalized. Subsequently, he was reported to the police and summoned to the police station, but refused, citing the reason of 'taking care of the children.' Later, he killed his four children between 3 and 6 December. Their bodies were discovered lined up in their bedroom, while their father was found in the bathroom, covered in blood with cut wounds on both wrists (possibly attempting to commit suicid) on 6 December.
Kabanjahe arson attack	27 June 2024	Kabanjahe, North Sumatra	4	Journalist for Tribrata TV, Rico Sempurna Pasaribu; along with his wife Elfrida Ginting, their son Sudi Investi Pasaribu, and grandson Loin Situngkir; were killed when arsonists set their home on fire.
Mulia killings	16 July 2024	Mulia, Puncak Jaya, Central Papua	3	A member of the TPNPB outside the Mulia District school was seen buying cigarettes, Indonesian Soldiers opened fire on him however he was able to escaped and three bystanders were killed in the crossfire.
Yahukimo massacre (2025)	6–7 April 2025	Yahukimo, Highland Papua	15	TPNPB militants attacked multiple illegal gold panning sites in Yahukimo Regency and killed 15 civilian gold miners.

== See also ==
- List of disasters in Indonesia
- List of terrorist incidents in Indonesia
- List of massacres in Timor-Leste
