= Biak massacre =

1998 massacre in Indonesia

- Part of the Papua conflict
- Island of Biak is located near Cendrawasih Bay, and is part of Biak Numfor Regency (red).
- Location: 1.00°S 136.00°E; Biak, Indonesia
- Date: 2–6 July 1998 (UTC+9)
- Target: Pro-independence civilians, members of the Free Papua Movement
- Attack type: Massacre
- Deaths: 40–150
- Perpetrators: Indonesian Armed Forces, Indonesian National Police
- Motive: Indonesian nationalism, Anti-Christian sentiment

The Biak massacre was the killing of West Papuan pro-independence demonstrators on the island of Biak, Papua, Indonesia, in 1998.

On the morning of 2 July 1998, unarmed villagers, including Nobel Peace prize nominee and political prisoner Filep Karma raised the West Papuan Morning Star flag at a water tower. In the afternoon, Indonesia police and military fired tear gas in an effort to disperse the crowd but was unsuccessful. This resulted in a stand-off that lasted several days until the morning of 6 July where the Indonesian security forces surrounded and fired upon the crowd.

According to Elsham Papua, a local human rights organization, 8 people were killed and a further 32 bodies were found near Biak in the following days. The Free Papua Movement claimed that around 150 people were killed.

To this day, no one has been charged with the killings and the massacre is not officially recognized. No government or international enquiry has reported on it.

== "Biak Massacre Citizens Tribunal" ==
In 2013, "The Biak Massacre Citizens Tribunal" was held at the University of Sydney, before jurists Keith Suter and John Dowd, with Nicholas Cowdery the former NSW Director of Public Prosecutions acting as counsel assisting.

In his concluding statement, Nicholas Cowdery said, "This was not, on the morning of the 6th of July, some sort of spontaneous violence, it came after days of careful contemplation by the authorities about what was happening and how it might be approached".

== Recent events ==
In 2021, The Guardian reported that Dan Weadon, an Australian military attaché and intelligence officer was present in Biak five days after the massacre, and had photographed 50 bullet holes on Biak water tower. Weadon was also given film taken by locals documenting the massacre. This evidence was apparently destroyed by the Australian Department of Defence in 2014.

Mark Davis, a lawyer involved in a request for said evidence described the destruction of the photos, which could be evidence of crimes against humanity, as disturbing and sickening. “The photos were not created by Australian intelligence, they were entrusted to them by the families of the injured and the dead who trusted that Australia would act upon those photos or at least safeguard the evidence”, he said.

In 2023, the Australian Greens used Indonesian President Joko Widodo's visit to Australia to bring attention to the Biak massacre with Senator Jordan Steele-John stating, "The government and ADF decision-makers must be held accountable for concealing the truth about the Biak massacre".

In 2024, the anniversary of the Biak massacre saw the raising of the Morning Star flag by West Papua supporters at the Indonesian Consulate in Sydney.

== See also ==
- List of massacres in Indonesia

== External links and further reading ==
- "Indonesia: Human Rights and Pro-Independence Actions in Irian Jaya- Introduction". Human Rights Watch. Human Rights Watch. Archived from the original on 5 January 2023.
- Tim Advokasi Hak Azasi Manusia untuk Rakyat Irian Jaya, "Laporan Pelanggaran HAM di Biak" (undated report)
- Knauss, Christopher (19 September 2021). "'Killed like animals': documents reveal how Australia turned a blind eye to a West Papuan massacre". The Guardian (Australian Edition). The Guardian.
