= Wamena =

Capital of Jayawijaya Regency, Indonesia

- Town (District) and regency seat
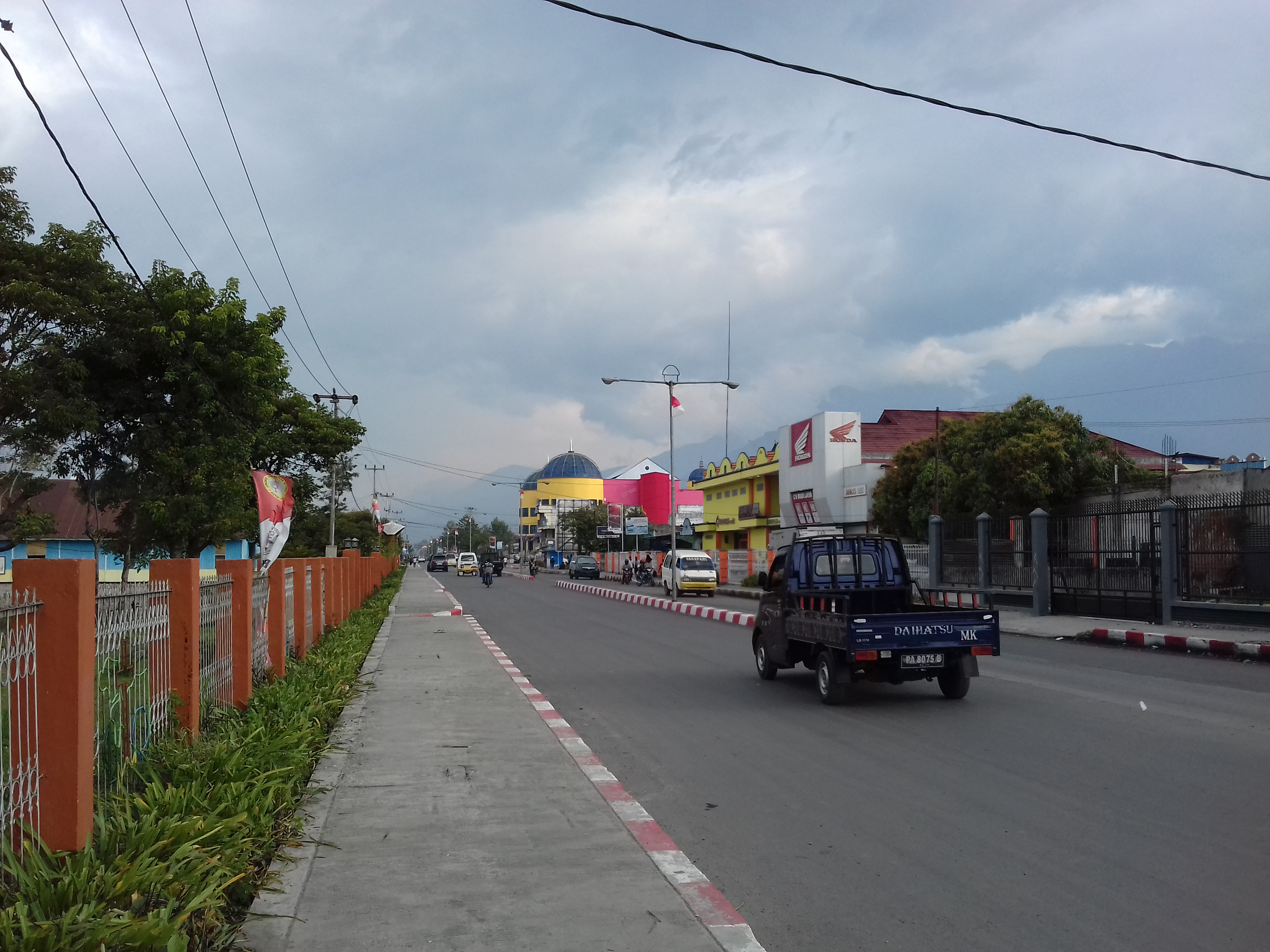
- Wamena in 2019
- Interactive map of Wamena
- Location in Highland Papua Location in Indonesian Papua Location in Indonesia
- Coordinates: 4°5′51″S 138°57′04″E
- Country: Indonesia
- Province: Highland Papua
- Regency: Jayawijaya Regency
- Elevation: 1,658 m (5,440 ft)

Population (mid 2023 estimate)
  - Total: 66,080

Wamena, also known as the District of Wamena (Distrik Wamena), is a large town in the Western New Guinea region of Indonesia. It also serves as the seat of Jayawijaya Regency. It is the largest town in the province of Highland Papua, located in the Baliem Valley and had a population of 64,967 in the 2020 Census; the official estimate in mid 2023 was 66,080. Wamena is the urban centre of a rural area housing Highland Papua's highest concentration of population, with over 300,000 people inhabiting the Baliem Valley and surrounding areas. These people belong to several related ethnic groups, the most prominent of which are the Dani, Lani, and Yali.

The town is also home to the Persiwa Wamena football team, which played in the Indonesian Super League until the early 2010s.

== History ==
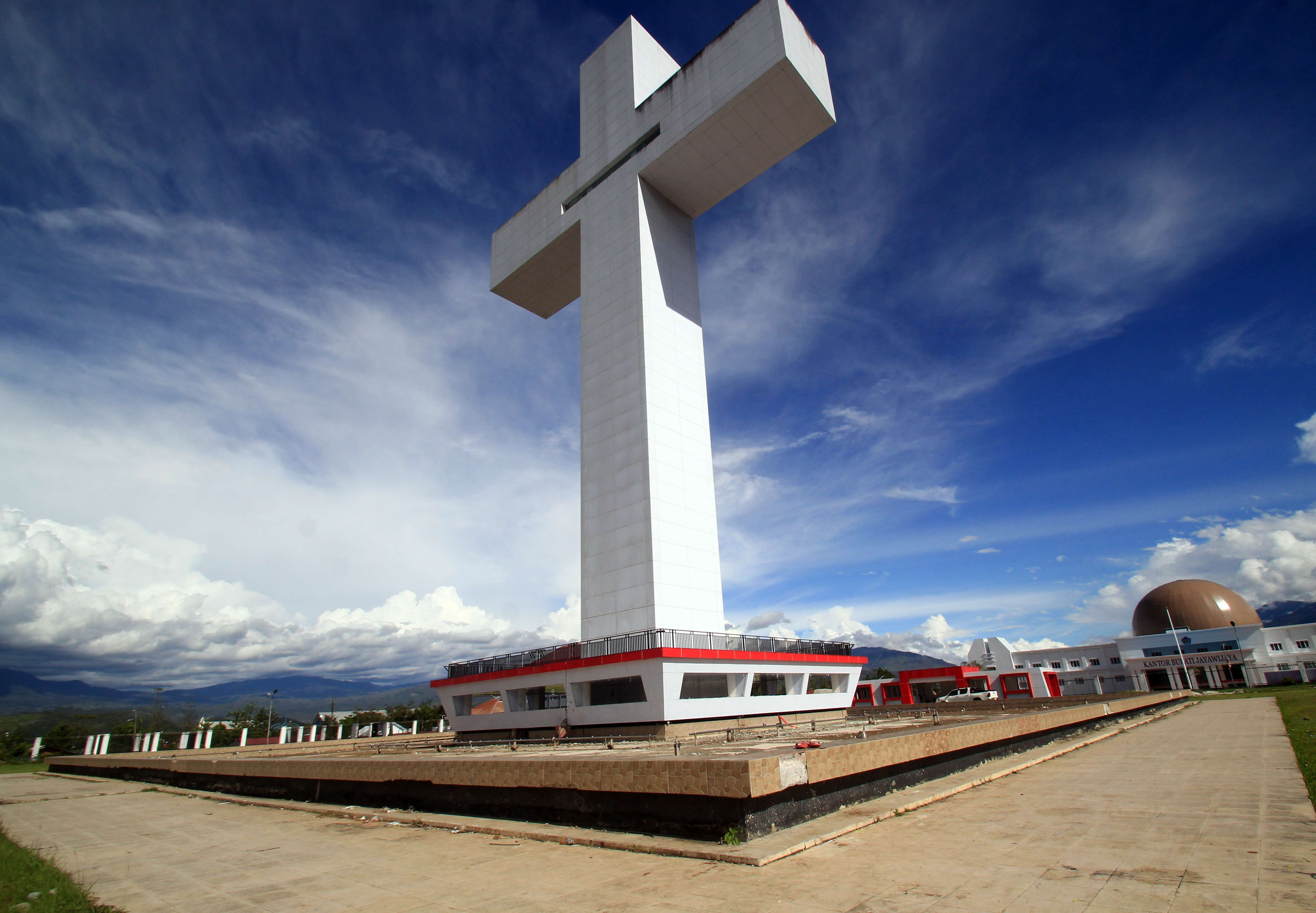
Cross monument in Wamena

As far as the outside world was concerned, the discovery of the Baliem Valley, where Wamena is located, and the unexpected presence of its large agricultural population was made by Richard Archbold's third zoological expedition to New Guinea in 1938. On 21 June an aerial reconnaissance flight southwards from Hollandia (now Jayapura) found what the expedition called the ‘Grand Valley’. Since it was almost completely cut off from the outside world, the area was spared by the fighting for the control of New Guinea during World War II. The town itself was founded by the Dutch in 1956, as one of the last towns founded during their presence in Western New Guinea. Since then the valley has gradually been opened up to a limited amount of tourism.

In 2003, during what would be called afterward the Wamena incident, an unidentified mob led by the Free Papua Movement raided the Indonesian Army's armoury of the town, killing two Indonesian soldiers and stealing several assault rifles. Reprisals were harsh, affecting 25 villages, displacing around 7,000 villagers, and killing 50 in the process, torture and destruction of properties by the Indonesian army were also reported.

During the 2019 Papua protests, several government buildings were destroyed by an angry mob, after which the police and the military retaliated, leaving 16 civilians killed and 65 injured. According to local authorities, the particular set of protests was triggered by a separate racism incident within the city. A Kompas correspondent in Wamena reported that gunshots sounded across the city and that civilians primarily migrants were taking shelter in police stations, military bases, local Papuan homes, and churches. Out of the 16 civilians killed, 13 had come from outside the province, and most deaths occurred as they were trapped in buildings torched by the angry mob. Later independence investigation by The Jakarta Post and local media Tabloid Jubi, revealed civilian victims were likely to be higher than official counts. Perpetrators were likely not local Wamenan and were too old to be students even though wearing high school uniforms. Racism incidents that were claimed to have happened in Wamena and spread through social media are also likely to be misinformation or even disinformation.

Responding to the protests, the Ministry of Communication and Information Technology reactivated the internet blackout in Wamena. Owing to the rioting and unrest, around 15,000 civilians were evacuated from Wamena, with a further 1,726 internally displaced within the town in early October. Going the opposite direction, around 2,000 Papuan students returned from other cities across Indonesia to their home towns and cities, reporting a feeling of intimidation and danger.

On 23 February 2023, around ten civilians were killed in a riot arising from a kidnapping accusation.

== Climate ==
Wamena features a tropical rainforest climate (Köppen: Af), which is milder than the surrounding regions due to its highland location.

Climate data for Wamena (2004–2020)
Month	Jan	Feb	Mar	Apr	May	Jun	Jul	Aug	Sep	Oct	Nov	Dec	Year
Mean daily maximum °C (°F)	26.0 (78.8)	25.9 (78.6)	26.1 (79.0)	26.0 (78.8)	26.3 (79.3)	25.5 (77.9)	24.9 (76.8)	25.5 (77.9)	25.7 (78.3)	26.3 (79.3)	26.2 (79.2)	26.3 (79.3)	25.9 (78.6)
Mean daily minimum °C (°F)	15.9 (60.6)	16.2 (61.2)	15.8 (60.4)	16.1 (61.0)	15.9 (60.6)	15.3 (59.5)	15.0 (59.0)	14.7 (58.5)	15.1 (59.2)	15.5 (59.9)	15.7 (60.3)	16.0 (60.8)	15.6 (60.1)
Average rainfall mm (inches)	178.7 (7.04)	178.2 (7.02)	213.3 (8.40)	249.8 (9.83)	122.9 (4.84)	133.5 (5.26)	117.1 (4.61)	110.3 (4.34)	138.1 (5.44)	143.0 (5.63)	162.9 (6.41)	166.5 (6.56)	1,914.3 (75.38)
Average rainy days	15.6	15.7	18.4	18.9	13.5	15.1	14.6	13.8	15.3	15.4	15.6	17.2	189.1
Source: Meteomanz

== Economy ==
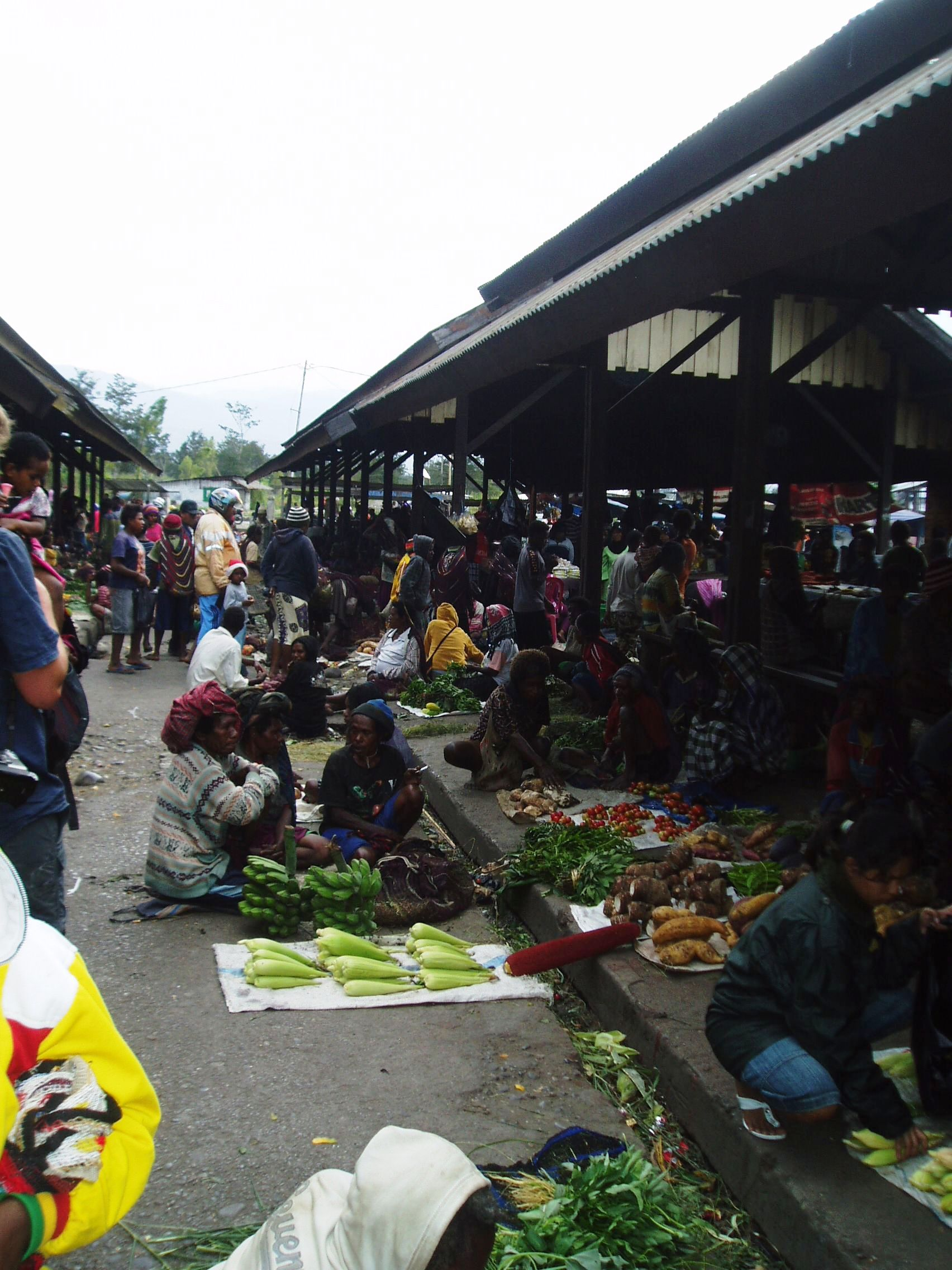
A market in Wamena.

Wamena claims a broader variety of fresh fruits and vegetables than other regions in Papua. On early 6 June 2013, a modern market was built in the town center to allow traditional farmers to sell their harvests at a proper price.

== Transport ==
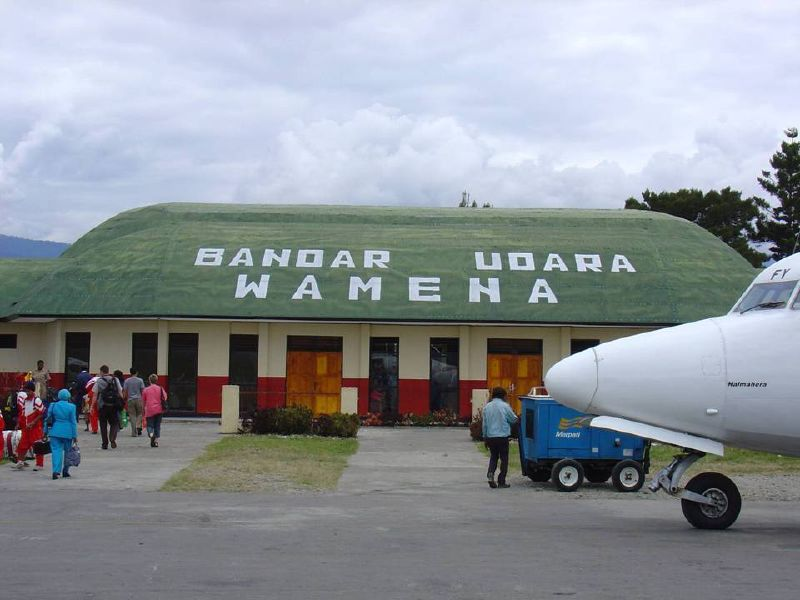
Wamena Airport old building.

Because of its relatively isolated location, the main form of access to the area is air travel. The town and the surrounding valley are served by the only Wamena Airport, which can accommodate the TNI's (Indonesian National Armed Forces) Hercules airplanes. Dimonim Air, Trigana Air, Aviastar Mandiri, Susi Air, Merpati and Wings Air serve the airport. The airport was razed by fire on 26 September 2011; all buildings including the departure and arrival terminals were engulfed by fire.

Parts of Trans-Papua Highway is passing Wamena, linking the town by road with cities across Papua such as Jayapura.

== Health ==
The largely Papuan town is densely settled and has extreme rates of HIV infection, with a claim of 5,100 cases recorded by Antara. On 16 June 2015, Jayawijaya regional secretary Yohanis Walilo rectified the total HIV cases to 4,521 HIV cases.
