= 2019 Indonesian protests and riots =

Series of mass protest

- Part of Post-Suharto era in Indonesia
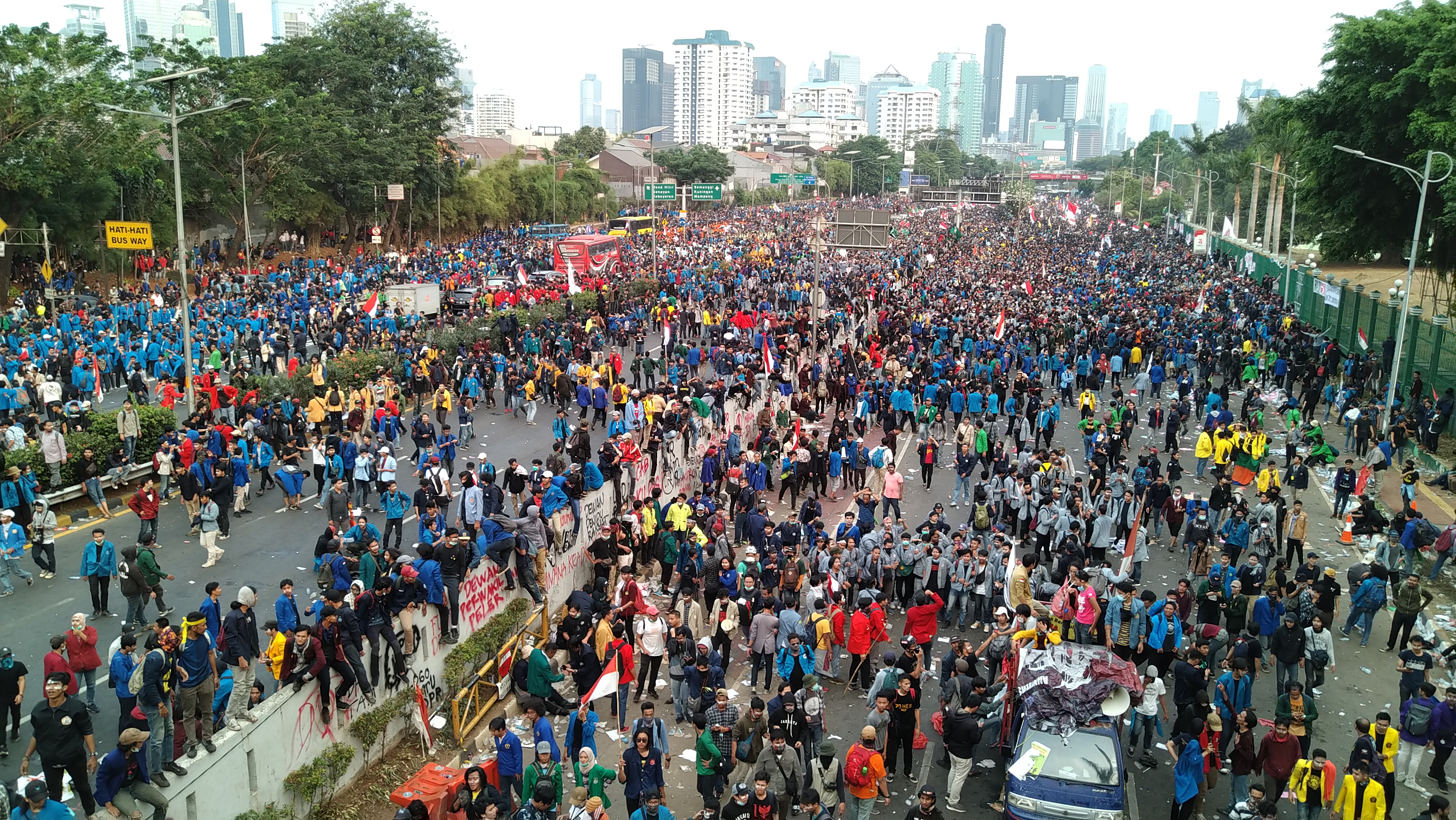
- Protesters occupying the Gatot Subroto Avenue in front of the DPR/MPR Building, Jakarta on 24 September 2019
- Date: 23 September – 28 October 2019 (1 month and 5 days)
- Location: Indonesia (Note: Yogyakarta, Malang, Semarang, Balikpapan (23 September 2019); Jakarta, Samarinda (23-25 September 2019); Banda Aceh, Medan, Padang, Palembang, Pekanbaru, Banjarmasin (24-25 September 2019); Makassar, Riau, Lampung, Jember, Bandung, Tasikmalaya (24 September 2019); Surabaya, Kendari (26 September 2019))
- Caused by: Ratification of the Revision of Corruption Eradication Commission Law (RUU KPK); Proposal of the Revision of Criminal Code (RKUHP) Bill; Proposal of other bills including on mining, land, labour, and correctional; Delay of the Elimination of Sexual Violence Bill (RUU PKS)
- Goals: "7 Demands and 7 Urges"
- Methods: Demonstration; Barricades; Civil disobedience; Vandalism; Riot; Looting
- Result: Criminal Code (RKUHP) Bill, Correctional Procedures Bill, Land Bill, and Mining Bill delayed in House

Parties
(Indonesia) Protesters: (no centralised authority): Student unions of various universities; Executive Body of Students (BEM); Labour unions; Congress of Indonesia Unions Alliance (KASBI); Indonesian Peasant Union (SPI); People's Struggle Front (FPR) (30 September)	(Indonesia) Government; House of Representatives; Indonesian National Police; Mobile Brigade Corps; Indonesian Army; Indonesian Marine Corps

Lead figures
Protesters: no centralised leadership	Government: Joko Widodo President of Indonesia; Ma'ruf Amin Vice President of Indonesia; Jusuf Kalla Former Vice President of Indonesia; (Indonesia) Muhammad Prasetyo Attorney General; (Indonesia) Mahfud MD Coordinating Minister for Political, Legal and Security Affairs; (Indonesia) Wiranto Former Coordinating Minister for Political, Legal and Security Affairs; (Indonesia) Tito Karnavian Minister of Interior; (Indonesia) Tjahjo Kumolo Former Minister of Interior; (Indonesia) Yasonna Laoly Minister of Justice; (Indonesia) Prabowo Subianto Minister of Defence; (Indonesia) Ryamizard Ryacudu Former Minister of Defence

Casualties and losses
5 dead (1 in traffic accident); 265 injured; 30 arrested	65 injured

A series of mass protests led by students took place at major cities in Indonesia from 23 September 2019, to rally against new legislation that reduces the authority of the Corruption Eradication Commission (KPK), as well as several bills including a new criminal code that penalises extramarital sex and defamation against the president. The protesters consisted of mostly students from over 300 universities, with no association with any particular political parties or groups. The protests were the most prominent student movement in Indonesia since the 1998 riots that brought down the Suharto regime.

In several cities including Jakarta, Bandung and Padang, protesters clashed with the Indonesian National Police (Polri), resulting in the riot police firing tear gas and water cannons. In the capital city of Jakarta, the police confirmed that at least 254 students and 39 police officers are injured or being treated in hospitals. In Kendari, Southeast Sulawesi, two students died, one of them allegedly being shot during the violent clash. Another three protesters died in Jakarta.

== Background ==
=== Revision of Corruption Eradication Commission Law (RUU KPK) ===
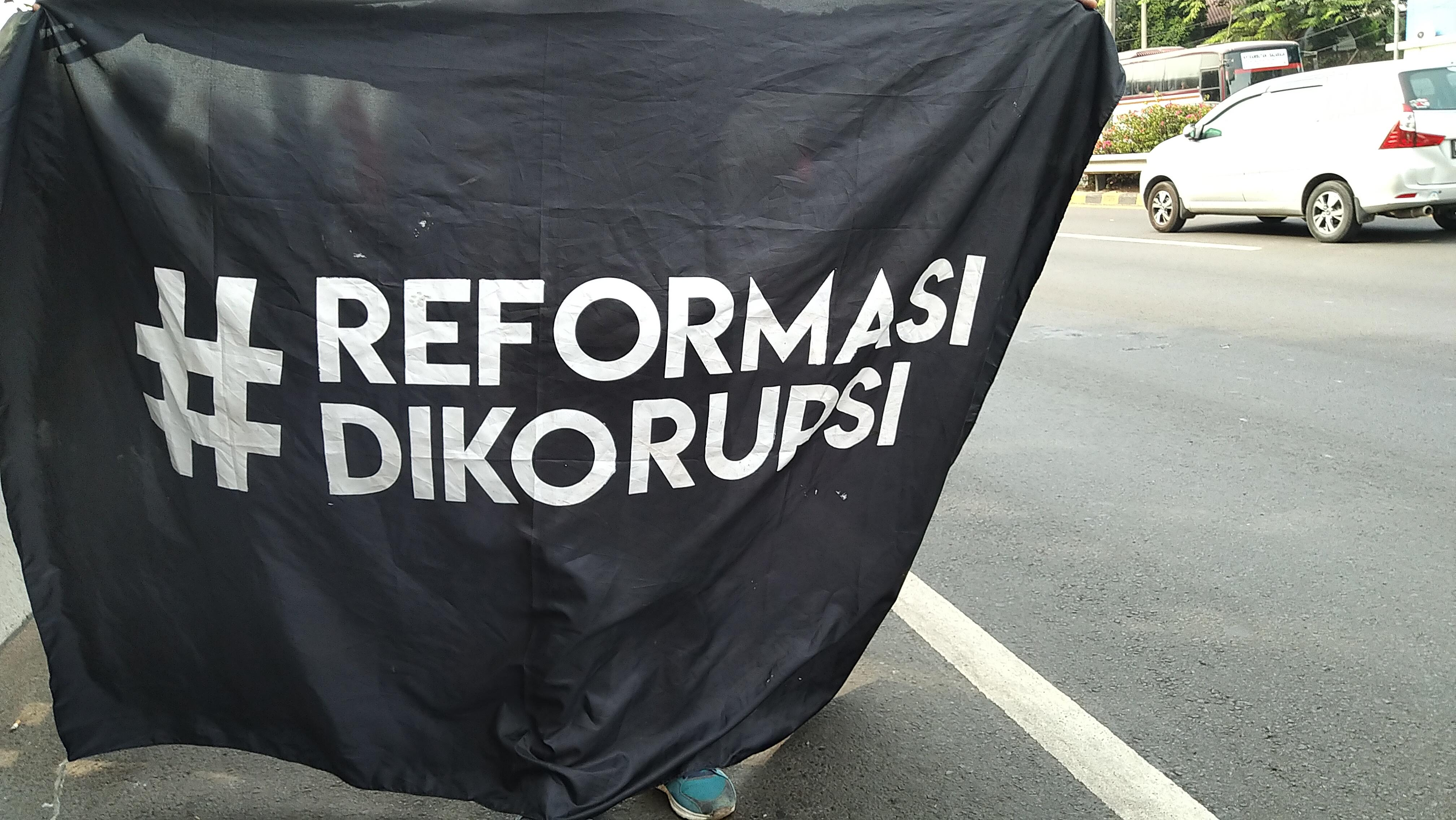
A slogan "Reformasi dikorupsi" ("Reformasi is being corrupted") is widely used during the protest.

The Revisions to Law no.30/2002 on Corruption Eradication Commission (RUU KPK) was ratified by the members of the People's Representative Council (DPR) who serve 2014–2019 term on 17 September 2019. Among the parliament, all parties under the government coalition, Indonesian Democratic Party of Struggle (PDIP), Golkar, NasDem Party, People's Conscience Party (Hanura), United Development Party (PPP), National Awakening Party (PKB), as well as an opposition party National Mandate Party (PAN) unanimously approved the bill. The ratification was made in just 13 days since the initiation. The initiation of the bill was made on 5 September 2019 without any significant interruptions. On 11 September 2019, President Joko Widodo issued a presidential letter to the Ministry of Law and Human Rights to discuss the revision along with the DPR. The administration agreed with the revision on 16 September, and the bill was ratified on the next day.

The revision was widely condemned by activists and experts for undermining the efficacy of KPK. Corruption is a significant political issue in Indonesia, and KPK, established in 2002, was a part of the reform demands that followed the overthrow of the authoritarian Suharto regime. Since its establishment, KPK has been known for targeting high-profile politicians and business people. The revision calls to reduce KPK's independent status by making it a governmental body, establishing an oversight council to monitor the commission, requiring KPK investigators official permission to conduct wiretaps, among others. Prior to the ratification, there were already numbers of small-scale protests going on in different cities. In Bali, hundreds of people gathered on 12 September 2019 to raise concerns over the bill. On the other hand, counter-protest by the pro-revision groups were also held in front of KPK headquarter in Jakarta. Some participants of the counter-protest reportedly admitted of being paid to participate without much knowledge on the issue itself.

=== Revision of Criminal Code Bill (RKUHP) ===
On 18 September 2019, the parliament discussed the bill on the revision of criminal code (RKUHP). The new criminal code has been under the creation for the past few decades, intended to replace the Dutch era set of laws. The amendment was previously introduced in 2015 by Yasonna Laoly, the minister of Law and Human Rights. Since earlier this year, conservative Islamic groups have been pushing again for an overhaul of the criminal code. The latest proposal includes several laws based on conservative religious interpretations, including the ban on premarital sex, living together outside of marriage, performing black magic, and abortion without reasons of medical emergency and rape. The vote was scheduled to be held on 24 September 2019, but facing the public outcry, the President announced to postpone the vote on 20 September 2019. However, there were still fears of the parliament pushing for the vote before the end of their term on 24 September 2019.

== Demands ==
A student group by the name of the Alliance of Acting People released what is called as "seven demands" (7 Tuntutan). These demands are shared by most of the rallies across the archipelago. The demands consist of the following:

1. Urge a delay to re-discuss the problematic articles in the RKUHP
2. Urge the government and the parliament to revise the recently passed KPK Law and reject any weakening of efforts to eradicate corruption in Indonesia
3. Demand that the state investigates and try the elites responsible for environmental damage in several regions in Indonesia
4. Reject the problematic articles in the Labour Bill (RUU Ketenagakerjaan) which do not favour workers
5. Reject the problematic articles in the Land Bill (RUU Pertanahan) which are a form of betrayal of the spirit of agrarian reform
6. Urging the passing of the Elimination of Sexual Violence Bill (RUU PKS)
7. Encourage the democratisation process in Indonesia and stop the arrest of activists in various sectors

The Executive Body of Students (BEM), a nationwide student organisation, also released what is called as "seven urges" (7 Desakan). The student rally in Jakarta on 24 September 2019 put up these demands. The demands consist of the following:

1. Reject the RKUHP, the Mineral Mining Bill, the Land Bill, the Correctional Procedure Bill, the Labour Bill, revoke the KPK Law and the Natural Resources Law, pass the RUU PKS and the Domestic Workers Protection Bill
2. Cancel the troubled KPK leaders chosen by both chambers of the People's Consultative Assembly
3. Deny TNI & Polri officials from occupying civilian positions
4. Stop militarism in Papua and other regions, release Papuan political prisoners immediately
5. Stop the criminalisation of activists
6. Stop burning forests in Kalimantan & Sumatra carried out by corporations, and address corporate forest fires, and revoke permits
7. Resolve human rights violations and prosecute human rights criminals, including those sitting in power circles. Restore the rights of the victims immediately.

== Protests ==
While small-scale demonstrations were already held sporadically, mass protests took place on 23 and 24 September, the last two days before the term end of the incumbent parliament members. The protest spread nationwide, including Jakarta, Bandung, Yogyakarta, Surabaya, Malang, Palembang, Medan, Padang, Semarang, Surakarta, Lampung, Aceh, Palu, Bogor, Denpasar, Makassar, Balikpapan, Samarinda, Purwokerto, Tasikmalaya, Kediri, Tanjungpinang, Cirebon, Jombang, and others.

=== 23 September ===
Students of various universities in the Jakarta metropolitan area responded to calls on social media to gather in front of the National Parliament Building in Jakarta. There was also a small presence of a student organisation, the Progressive Student for Anti-Corruption (MAPAK). On this day, both sides of the pro and anti-bill camps were present at the place. Anti-bill camp increased its number as time progresses, blocking the Gatot Subroto Avenue on the way to Slipi. Large numbers of farmers also joined the event from the afternoon to protest against the Land Bill, marching down from the Merdeka Palace.

While there were attempts to block the Jakarta Inner Ring Road, the rally ended without significant altercation. Protesters shout slogans such as "DPR are fascist and anti-democratic". The protest in Jakarta was crowd-funded through KitaBisa. The number of protesters reached two thousand.

Rallies were also held peacefully in other cities, including Yogyakarta, Bandung, Malang, Balikpapan, Samarinda and Purwokerto. Rallies in Yogyakarta, Bandung, and Malang gathered more than a thousand participants.

=== 24 September ===
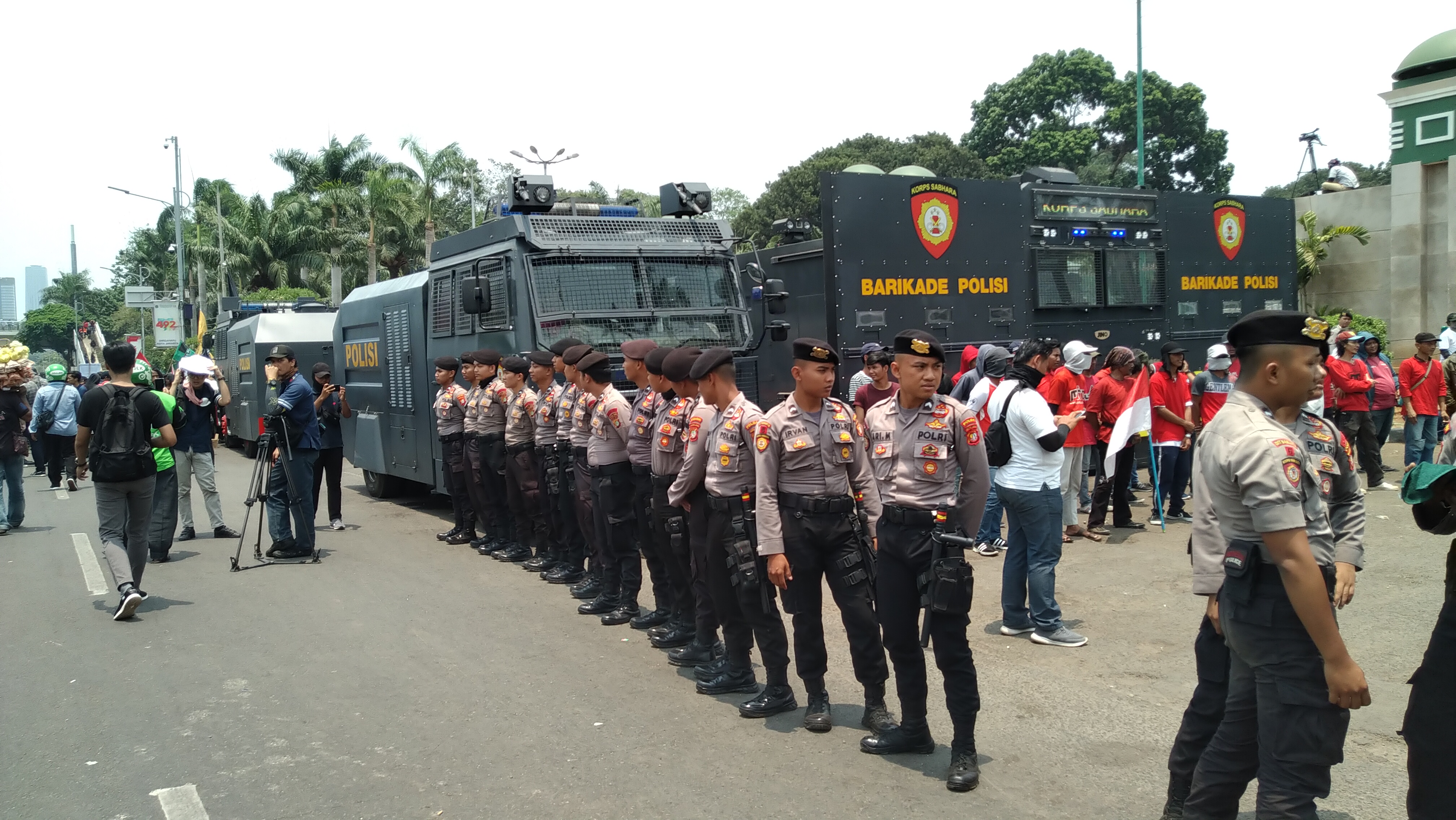
Polri officers and Brimob water cannons in front of the DPR/MPR Building in Jakarta, 24 September 2019.

Greater Jakarta Metropolitan Regional Police received an announcement for another rally scheduled on 24 September 2019. In anticipation of the event, a total of 18,000 personnel was deployed around the parliament building. Another 252 police officers were dispatched for traffic control.

On this day, students from the remote area including Bandung and Yogyakarta participated in the demonstration in Jakarta. At 16:00 (WIB), the crowd was already occupying the Gatot Subroto Avenue in front of the parliament building. Student representatives demanded a meeting with the House leaders, which was rejected by the police. This prompted protesters to throw rocks and bottles into the building, and eventually, attempt to intrude into the site by breaking the fence. The police responded by launching water cannon into the protesters and firing tear gas to disperse the crowd. The clash continued until midnight. There was a reported case of police beating up a limp protester at the Jakarta Convention Center.

The police acknowledged the destruction of three police and military vehicles as well as three police outposts. They also confirmed the arrest of 94 protesters, injury of 254 protesters and 39 police officers. Among them, eleven are reportedly hospitalised, and three are critically injured. The number of participants in the Jakarta protest reached tens of thousands.

In Padang, thousands of protesters clashed with the police and security forces armed with water cannons. Protesters eventually overwhelmed the police and entered into the governor's office.

Rallies were held peacefully in other cities, including Palembang, Semarang, Surakarta, Medan, Lampung, Aceh, and Makassar. Rallies in Palembang, Lampung, and Makassar gathered more than a thousand participants.

=== 25 September ===
Vocational school students from various parts of the Jakarta metropolitan area continued the rioting in front of the parliament building. On one occasion, a molotov cocktail was thrown towards police barricades. The police apprehended 17 protesters, mostly underage students. The police reported that some of the protesters do not recognise the content of the bill, they admitted that they was paid and persuaded by KPK officials who affiliated with Taliban and some elites.

The police have confirmed the deaths of two protesters. One is a high school student who died in a traffic accident on the way to the demonstration in Jakarta. The other one, neither a high school nor university student, likely died due to suffocation.

In Surabaya, the head of provincial legislative council Kusnadi reached out to protesters, explained that he has no authority to overturn the controversial bills and he also disagreed personally to the decisions made by the national parliament.

=== 26 September ===
In Kendari, Southeast Sulawesi, two students died after a violent clash between the protesters and police in front of the provincial legislative council (DPRD) building. A student was allegedly shot, and the Indonesian Ombudsman has launched an investigation into the origin of the bullet. Southeast Sulawesi police chief denied the use of live rounds nor rubber bullets by the police force. Later that evening, another student succumbed to blunt force injuries to the skull, after attempts to operate on his injuries failed to improve his condition.

Usman Hamid of Amnesty International demanded the authority for an immediate investigation and accountability. A board chairman of the Muhammadiyah Student League (IMM), to which the victims belong, demanded the removal of the Southeast Sulawesi police chief from its position. Solidarity rallies for the victims were held throughout the country.

Rallies were continuously held nationwide, including in Surabaya, Magelang, and Ciamis. In Magelang, an employee of the Ministry of Transportation was injured during the evacuation from the riot.

=== 27 September ===
Hundreds of students from the Muslim Students Association (HMI) held a protest and burned tires in front of the parliament building in Jakarta and elsewhere, demanding accountability for the two victims in South Sulawesi.

A clash occurred between the protesters and riot police in Makassar, and one protester was hit by a riot control vehicle.

=== 30 September ===
As the last parliament session was being held, protests are again being held in several cities. In Jakarta, protesters were blocked from protesting in front of the parliament building as it was barricaded by the police. Protests were held peacefully in Mataram, Pekanbaru, Yogyakarta and Kendari.

== Reactions ==
President Joko Widodo denied the possibility of vetoing the ratification of RUU KPK. The Minister of Law and Human Rights Yasonna Laoly also assured that the President would not issue a presidential decree to repeal the revision. Widodo and Laoly both stated that the issue should be settled through the constitutional procedure by filing to the Constitutional Court. Laoly criticised the demonstration and urged not to normalise the forceful amendment of the legislation, citing the risk of legitimising governmental institutions.

The Minister of Research, Technology and Higher Education Mohamad Nasir stated that the President warned university lecturers against student mobilisations. He stated that lecturers, who called upon their students to join the protest or lecturers whose students are found joining the protest would be sanctioned by the government.

Oce Madril, the head of an anti-corruption study centre in Gajah Mada University, criticised the President's response, stating that he had failed to respond to the public resentment toward RUU KPK. He contrasted with the RKUHP, which was postponed, arguing that the President's lack of willingness to accommodate the voice of people would strengthen the allegations that there is corruptive power behind the legislation, and the President himself is a part of the corruption. Oce also stated that this event had devastated public trust toward President's commitment to eradicating corruption.

The government of the United States, the United Kingdom, and Australia have issued travel warnings to citizens who wish to visit Indonesia.

=== Criticism on foreign media coverage ===
The student protests made headlines not only in the national media but also in international news outlets. However, many international news outlets focused only on the contentious Criminal Code (RKUHP) bill, in which one of its articles criminalises premarital sex. This includes the BBC, Deutsche Welle, The Japan Times, Al Jazeera, Reuters, The Sydney Morning Herald, and CNN. These outlets published articles implying that Indonesians were only protesting about "sex before marriage" bill or "sex ban law", dubbed by The BBC and The Japan Times respectively. This was criticised by the Indonesian media and activists, as the revision of the RKUHP is only one among several problematic bills that the students are protesting. The students have seven demands in total, encompassing several issues.

== See also ==
- 2007 Bersih rally
- Bersih 2.0 rally
- EDSA Revolution
- EDSA II Revolution
- 2019–20 Hong Kong protests
- May 1998 riots of Indonesia
- May 2019 Jakarta protests and riots
- Indonesian Criminal Code Protest
- 2024 Indonesian local election law protests
- 2025 Indonesian protests
