= 2023 Wamena riot =

Incident in Highland Papua, Indonesia

- Date: 23 February 2023
- Location: Sinakma, Wamena, Highland Papua, Indonesia

Parties
Rioters	Indonesian Police; Indonesian Army

Casualties and losses
- 12 total killed (rioters and non-rioters); 20+ civilians and rioters injured 18 police and soldiers injured

On 23 February 2023 (UTC+9), a riot broke out in Sinakma, Wamena, Highland Papua when a crowd of Papuans attacked Indonesian security personnel following the arrest of two Batak merchants accused of child kidnapping. In the ensuing clash, a number of buildings were damaged, with twelve civilians and rioters killed including both merchants. Tens of security personnel and civilians were also injured.

== Background ==
Tensions between Indonesian authorities and Papuan locals in the highland regions of Papua had been running high in early 2023, especially following the Nduga hostage crisis. The town of Wamena had previously seen large-scale rioting in 2019 where tens of civilians were killed, mostly non-Papuans. Indonesian authorities had accused armed groups affiliated with the separatist National Committee for West Papua of being behind the 2019 riot. A more immediate cause was the rise of child kidnapping rumors in social media all over Indonesia in early 2023, with a woman accused of child kidnapping being burned alive by a mob in Sorong. She was later proven innocent.

== Course ==
The riot occurred on 23 February 2023. According to local human rights activist Theo Hasegem, the riot broke out after a misunderstanding between two Batak merchants and a local Papuan child in the Sinakma Market resulted in the merchants being accused of kidnapping. Local community leader Gibson Kogoya remarked that the merchants had asked for the child to hop on a pickup truck he used as a kiosk when the child wanted to purchase items, but the child perceived this to be a kidnapping attempt and fled. Accounts from the Indonesian authorities noted that locals had halted the merchants and brought them to the police station, where the involved parties clarified the situation. This clarification did not happen in the police station as intended, but on the street near to the location where the alleged incident happened.

While the merchants were in police custody, an angry crowd of Papuans gathered, at around 12:30 local time (05:30 UTC). Indonesian authorities claimed that a chain message accusing the police of protecting child kidnappers had spread through WhatsApp. When the crowd demanded that the police release the merchants for public questioning, the police refused. Tensions continued to rise and the merchant was evacuated in a riot control vehicle. In an attempt to disperse the crowd, security personnel utilized tear gas, batons and warning shots. The crowd became agitated and a number of shophouses belonging to Batak were set on fire. Clashes then occurred, which resulted in a number of deaths and injuries. Both of the accused Batak merchants, Albert Sitorus and Ramot Siagian, were killed during the rioting. It was later reported that fifteen buildings were torched during the rioting.

== Aftermath ==
In the aftermath of the rioting, Indonesian security forces deployed 200 additional personnel to secure the area, including a Mobile Brigade company. By the following day, the situation was described by authorities as "conducive", with no further violence reported. They also reported that ten civilians had been killed, while 18 police officers or soldiers had been injured by either arrows or thrown rocks. Out of the ten civilians initially reported killed, either seven or eight were reportedly rioters shot by security forces, the rest being non-Papuan civilians killed by rioters. Hasegem reported that nine Papuans were killed, eight of whom were shot. He further noted that most of the killed Papuans had been shot in the head or neck. By 24 February, authorities had confirmed twelve deaths: Sitorus and Siagian, along with ten Papuans. At least 23 injuries among civilians and rioters were recorded.

Due to the incident, schools in the town were closed the following day. Thousands of civilians took refuge in the local military and police headquarters or places of worship. The police chief for Papua, Mathius D. Fakhiri, initiated an evaluation on the conduct of local police units, and requested that police use a "soft" approach in responding to locals due to heightened tensions. The ten Papuans killed were buried on 25 February at the Sinakma Public Cemetery. The previous day, bodies of Sitorus and Siagian had been flown to Jayapura and later to Medan.

On 26 February, authorities arrested 13 individuals suspected of inciting the riots. They were released two days later. Coordinating Minister for Political, Legal, and Security Affairs Mahfud MD later stated that the riot had nothing to do with the ongoing separatist movement, and had been purely incited by the kidnapping rumor. The Tempo newspaper in an editorial blamed the security forces' "violent" approach in Papua for causing the riot.
