= 2003 Wamena incident =

Wamena Incident
- Part of the Papua conflict
Date	4 April 2003
Location	around Wamena, Jayawijaya Regency, Papua

Belligerents
Indonesia	(Republic of West Papua) Free Papua Movement (Note: Initial raid)

Casualties and losses
2 dead 1 heavily injured	Unknown
- 51 civilians killed (Note: 9 as a direct result of the operations, 42 due to starvation following relocations); 38 heavily injured

The 2003 Wamena incident (Indonesian: Peristiwa Wamena 2003) involved a sweeping operation and forced relocation of civilians around the town of Wamena by the Indonesian Army and the Indonesian National Police following a raid on an armory. The operations lasted for around two months following the raid, displacing thousands of civilians and resulting in the deaths of around fifty civilians from various causes.

== Incidents ==
The raid occurred on 4 April 2003 at around 1 AM, launched by an unidentified mob, against the armory of the Wamena District of the Indonesian Army. In the raid itself, 29 rifles were stolen by Papuan rebels alongside 3,500 rounds of ammunition. During the raid, two Indonesian soldiers were killed and one was heavily injured.

Between April and June 2003, sweeping operations were launched around Wamena, affecting 25 villages. The National Commission on Human Rights (Komnas HAM) estimated that nine civilians were killed and 38 were heavily injured. Torture and destruction of property and public facilities were also reported. Around 7,000 villagers were forcefully displaced, and 42 died due to starvation during this period. Reports characterized the operations as not discriminating locals and those involved in the rebel movement.

== Aftermath ==
Investigations of the human rights violations during the incident was launched by Komnas HAM following approval by then-president Megawati Sukarnoputri. However, as of 2019, the violations have not went to court. The events have been referred to as Tragedi Wamena Berdarah (Bloody Wamena Tragedy).

Five men arrested and imprisoned for their alleged involvement in the 2003 raid were given clemency by Indonesian President Widodo during one of his visits to Papua in May 2015.
