= 2022 Timika killings =

Mass killing in West Papua, Indonesia

Timika massacre
- Part of the Papua conflict
- Location: Timika, Mimika Regency, West Papua, Indonesia
- Date: 22 August 2022
- Attack type: Extrajudicial execution
- Deaths: 4
- Perpetrators: Indonesian Army and local civilians

The 2022 Timika killings or the Timika massacre, was the killing of four Nduga Papuans near the city of Timika, by members of the Indonesian Army and local civilians in August 2022.

== Killings ==
On 22 August 2022, Indonesian soldiers arrested Irian Nirigi, Arnold Lokbere, Atis Tini and Kelemanus Nirigi, for attempting to buy weapons from them in Timika. They shot them dead, dismembered their bodies and stuffed them in sacks which they then threw in the Pigapu river.

On 26 August, the bodies were discovered in the Pigapu river not far from Timika. Later Kelemanus Nirigi or Leman was identified as a weapons supplier for Egianus Kogoya TPNPB faction in Nduga, he was tasked with collecting munitions in Mimika.

== Trial ==
In August 2022, Mimika military police identified 10 anonymous suspects. From 29 August to 17 September 2022, 9 of the 10 suspects were arrested, four of them (Andre Pudjianto Lee, Dul Uman, Rafles Laksana, and Roy Marten Howay) being civilians, with Howay, an Ayamaru Papuan, having evaded capture and the other six being active soldiers, the soldiers being a captain (Dominggus Kainama), a major (Helmanto Fransiskus Dakhi), and four privates (Rahmat Amin Sese, Robertus Putra Clinsman, Pargo Rumbouw, and Rizky Oktaf Muliawan).

On 24 January 2023 a military court sentenced Dakhi to life imprisonment. On 15 February 2023 another military court sentenced the other four of the six soldiers, two of them were sentenced to life and the other two were sentenced to 15 and 20 years respectively. Dominggus Kainama died during incarceration on 24 December 2022 before being sentenced.
