= KASBI =

Indonesian trade union

Konfederasi KASBI
- Konfederasi Kongres Aliansi Serikat Buruh Indonesia
- Founded: 4 February 2005
- Members: 130,000
- Affiliations: WFTU
- Website: kasbi.or.id

KASBI, (Indonesian: Kongres Aliansi Serikat Buruh Indonesia, lit. 'Congress of Indonesia Unions Alliance') is an Indonesian trade union formed in 2005 by 18 labor unions. In 2011, they were engaged in a strike action with Carrefour, a French retailer which operates a hypermarket chain in Indonesia. Carrefour had allegedly evaded strict Indonesian labor law by treating its employees as contract employees.
