= Indonesian Japanese =

Indonesian Japanese or Japanese Indonesian may refer to

- Indonesia–Japan relations
- Japanese occupation of Indonesia
- Indonesians in Japan
- Japanese people in Indonesia
- Multiracial people of mixed Indonesian and Japanese descent
