= Kiwirok bombings =

Bombings against civilians in Indonesia

- Part of the Papua conflict
- Location: Kiwirok, Oksibil, Bintang Mountains Regency, Papua (now Highland Papua), Indonesia
- Date: 10–24 October 2021 (2 weeks)
- Target: West Papua National Liberation Army
- Deaths: 50–300
- Victim: Papuan civilians
- Perpetrator: Indonesian National Armed Forces
- Motive: Anti-Papuan sentiment Anti-Christian sentiment

The Kiwirok bombings were a series of aerial bombardments carried out by the Indonesian National Armed Forces (TNI) against civilians in the Kiwirok district of the Bintang Mountains Regency, Papua (now in Highland Papua), Indonesia in October 2021.

== Background ==
After gaining independence from the Netherlands, Indonesia claimed all Dutch colonial territories of the Malay Archipelago, including West Papua (formerly Dutch New Guinea). Following a controversial referendum known as the Act of Free Choice, the Papua conflict began as separatists from the Free Papua Movement (OPM) and West Papua National Liberation Army (TPNPB) have conducted a low-intensity guerrilla war against the Indonesian forces, while Indonesia has been accused of conducting a genocidal campaign against the local indigenous tribes.

On 8 September 2021, members of the TPNPB burnt machinery used for the construction of the Trans-Papua Highway. Five days later, riots broke out in Kiwirok when members of the TPNPB attacked public buildings, including a school and a medical centre, injuring nine people, one of whom later died. This incident was quite unusual for Kiwirok as TPNPB attacks have usually focused on other areas such as Oksibil. As a result, Indonesia has strengthened their military presence in Kiwirok, further intensifying the conflict. This included carrying out several raids during the months of September and October, in which Indonesian security forces took villagers' belongings, and in extreme cases, killed their livestock and even removed roofing from their homes.

== Bombing ==
On 10 October 2021, 14 bombs were dropped onto two buildings, including the TPNPB's local headquarters. According to Papuan People's Assembly chairman Timotius Murib, this was then followed by a series of bombings between 14 and 21 October, in which 42 bombs were dropped in residential areas within 4 villages. Eyewitness testimony obtained by the BBC corroborates this account, while later reporting has identified nine villages which were bombed in the campaign: Depsus, Kotopib, Fomdin, Pemas, Lolim, Delepkrin, Kiwi, Kiwi station, and Babinbahkon.

According to information obtained by Tempo, and confirmed by Indonesian forces, Serbian-made Krušik mortars were used in the bombings. Witness testimony states that four helicopters, as well as one drone were used to carry out the bombings. According to Conflict Armament Research, Indonesia's State Intelligence Agency (BIN) had purchased roughly 2,500 mortars in February 2021. The purchased mortars had been modified in Indonesia. Questions have also been raised by whether or not the bombs were dropped from BIN or TNI aircraft, the latter of which would constitute a violation of the ammunition purchase agreement according to Serbia. Later reporting also stated that Thales FZ-68 rockets were also used during the bombardments, while the drone was likely identified as a Ziyan Blowfish A3 based on drawings from witnesses.

Lamek Taplo, a TPNPB commander and eyewitness to the bombings, further claims that multiple people died in the aftermath not due to direct injuries but the effects of poison, accusing the Indonesian military to have deployed chemical warfare in their attacks. The use of white phosphorus in Indonesian military airstrikes in West Papua had already been documented years prior.

== Aftermath ==
Estimates regarding the casualties following the bombings vary wildly. According to Indonesian media, 500 people were reportedly forced to flee their homes as a result of the conflict as a whole, while the BBC has stated that the number "could be in the hundreds or thousands". Later reporting based on eyewitness reports puts this number as high as 2,000 from the bombings alone, and states that 15 people died as a direct outcome of the bombings, while 284 died as a result of starvation after having to flee their homes. Numbers obtained by church workers were lower, putting the total death toll to approximately 50 people. Several villages also became inhospitable as a result, with Human Rights Monitor identifying 206 buildings which were destroyed, 127 were residential buildings destroyed by the Indonesian Security Forces, while the rest were public buildings destroyed by either the Indonesian forces or TPNPB.
