= Bloody September incident =

Bloody September (Indonesian: September Berdarah) was an incident which took place on 26 September 2019 during the height of the 2019 Indonesian protests and riots in Kendari, Southeast Sulawesi. Two Haluoleo University students, Imawan Randi and Yusuf Kardawi, were allegedly shot by police while protesting in front of the provincial parliament building and the regional police headquarters against the controversial revision of the status of the Corruption Eradication Commission and the new Criminal Code Bill.

The shooting has been commemorated by the students of the university every year since with demands for an investigation and prosecution of the perpetrator. In 2022, the commemoration's demonstration ended in a riot and clashes with security personnel. Both cases' investigations, as of 2022, have not yet been closed.
