= Telkomsel BTS tower shooting =

Free Papua Movement attack in Puncak Regency, Papua, Indonesia

- Part of the Papua conflict
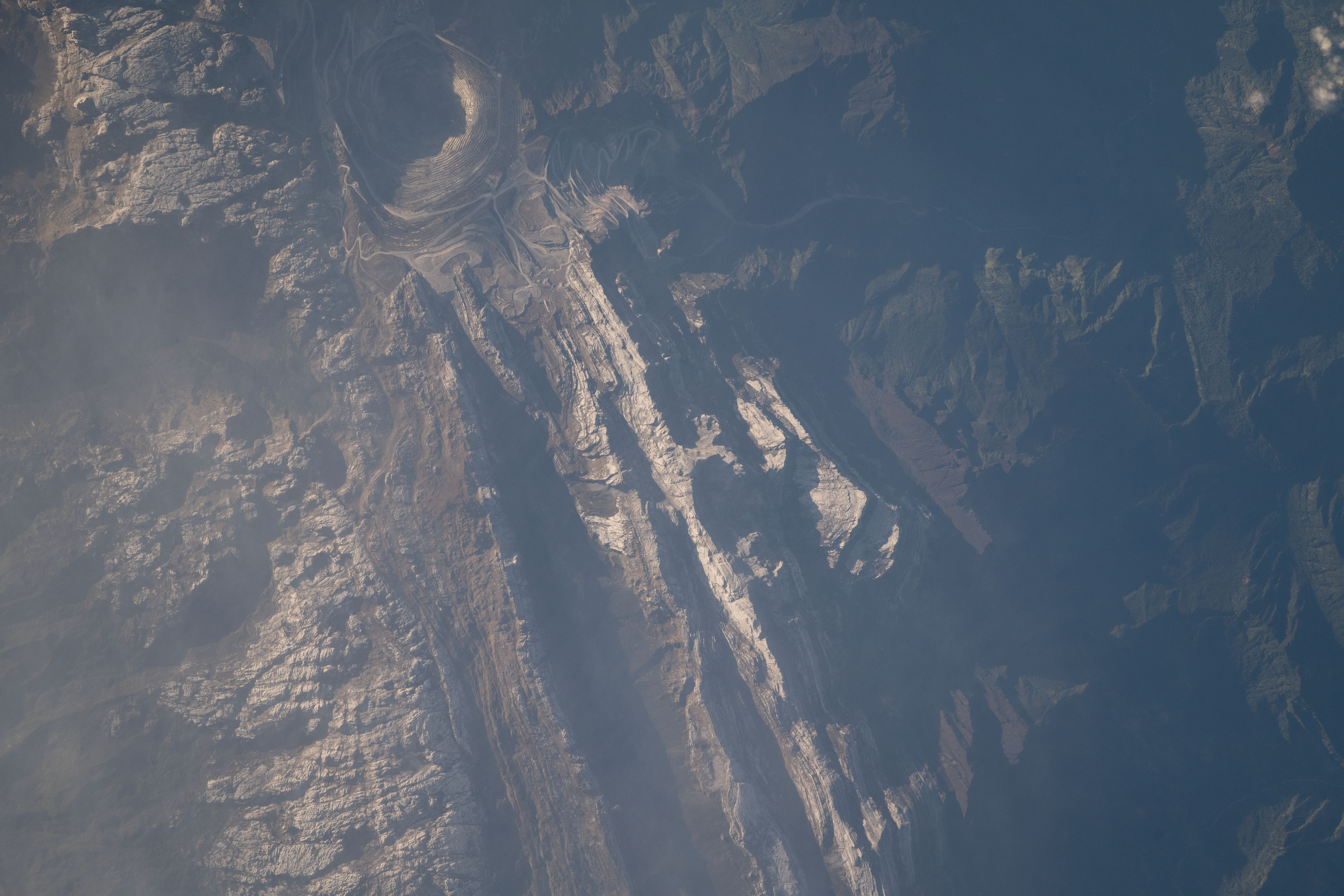
- Aerial photograph of the terrain near Beoga.
- Location: Beoga, Puncak Regency, Central Papua, Indonesia
- Date: 2 March 2022; 03:00 (UTC+09:00)
- Target: PT Palapa Timur Telematika employees
- Attack type: attack on communications tower
- Weapon: Automatic firearms
- Deaths: 8
- Injuries: 1
- Perpetrator: West Papua Liberation Organization
- No. of participants: 12

On 2 March 2022, gunmen of the Free Papua Movement attacked and killed eight workers at a Telkomsel telecommunications facility (BTS 3) in Beoga, Puncak Regency, in the Central Papua province of Indonesia.

== Background ==
The technicians were fixing the building's transceiver when around twelve militants attacked the structure and began gunning them down. One of the workers managed to flee and sent a message via the building's CCTV to Telkomsel's headquarters in Jakarta. One survivor of the attack is Nelson Sarira, while the other eight killed victims are Bona Simanullang, Billy Garibaldi, Renaltagasye Tentua, Jamaludin, Eko Septiansyah, Syahril Nurdiansyah, Ibo, and Bebi Tabuni.

The West Papua Liberation Organization claimed responsibility for the killings. The group's spokesman, Sebby Sambom, said the movement had previously told civilians to leave the area and that "There is no reason to justify that they are civilians when we have announced all immigrants to immediately leave the war zone."

The attack was condemned by many Indonesian authorities, including local military official Aqsha Erlannga, who described the shooting as an "extraordinary crime." As well as, general tribal leader of Dani from Puncak Regency, Abelom Kogoya as one of the victim Bebi Tabuni was the son of Dani tribal head from Gome, Ilaga District, Abeloni Tabuni, both condemned the attack. Abelom Kogoya further declared the KKB (armed gunmen) to not be part of family anymore and will secure them for authorities if they take further actions, "Otherwise why would they kill this son (Bebi), they only destroy Ilaga, burning and killing".

The attack was one of the deadliest incidents in the recent history of the Papua conflict, which has been ongoing since 1962.
