= 2023 Indonesian child abduction scare =

Child safety scare in Indonesia

In early 2023, rumours regarding child kidnappings across Indonesia triggered a series of mass hysteria and vigilante actions across the country. The rumours were mostly spread through WhatsApp, Facebook, and TikTok which, according to authorities, were mostly fake. The rumours resulted in injuries and fatalities in some places, with the most severe cases resulting in a riot in Wamena which killed twelve people; and in Sorong, where a woman was burned alive. In other places such as North Musi Rawas Regency, five men were injured after being beaten by a mob who accused them of kidnapping; and in Surabaya, where a mentally ill person was also beaten to death by a mob.

== Background ==
The rumours started in early January 2023 in various locations such as Sumatra, Java, Sulawesi, and Papua. Most of these rumours appeared to be used against perceived outsider or migrant communities around them, while some blamed the mentally-ill. Officials argued this was due to low digital literacy within Indonesians, while experts added that this is due to low trust in the state instruments. The rumours multiplied fast through social media and caused mob rules and vigilante actions across the country.

Most of the rumours were dismissed as fake and "scaremongering" by officials. Despite this, there are several viral kidnapping cases reported since December 2022 according to Ministry of Women Empowerment and Child Protection.

== Timeline ==
In Ambon, Maluku early January 2023, a rumour spread across communities that four elementary students were almost duped and kidnapped. This resulted in mayor of the city asking for investigation behind the rumour. However, until 11 January, there were no confirmation regarding the case. Later, head of police of the city, Meity Jacobus, clarified that the kidnapping never took place and the story was made up by the children.

In late January 2023, a voice recording that talked about an attempt of child kidnapping spread across WhatsApp in East Java. On 31 January, regional police of the province said that the rumour was fake and will investigate the source of said rumour. Screenshots of a conversation about a supposed child abduction with photo of the child's corpse were spread on WhatsApp through chain messages in Depok. The screenshots were later dismissed as hoax by the local Director of Cyber Crime.

On 23 January, a woman in Tangerang Regency, Banten, escaped an attack after being falsely accused of kidnapping a child in a small neighbourhood.

On 24 January, a woman in Sorong was accused of kidnapping a child. The police wanted to question her and escorted her to a police office, but were confronted by an angry mob who burned her to death during a riot. Rumours were spread through WhatsApp chain messages about a supposed child kidnapping case in Pontianak, coupled with a viral video of a supposedly kidnapped student from Jl. Ampera. This later was clarified to be false after authorities verified it to schools around the area.

On 3 February 2023, in Surabaya, a man with mental illness who was giving out candy to children was accused of being a kidnapper by the children, and later beaten by angry mobs. A similar rumour was spread in Sampang, a school student claimed she was almost kidnapped in a video, but this was later disproven.

On 7 February, five traders who were travelling from Jambi to Lubuklinggau stopped on North Musi Rawas Regency, where they were accused to have kidnapped a child by a woman who later reported them to her relatives and the head of her village. The head of the village made several announcements warning residents about the presence of a child kidnapper in the area through WhatsApp, which devolved into vigilante action against the traders.

In early February, a man was arrested by police for sharing false rumours about a child abduction in Minahasa Regency using an old video of police chasing a motorcycle thief. Similar rumour was also dismissed by local police as "false" in Palu, Central Sulawesi. Several pamphlets were found scattered around Samarinda, East Kalimantan with messages warning about child kidnapping together with several photos of supposed-preparators. The information within the pamphlets were unverified and later removed by police on 2 February. Traders in a market in Kupang, East Nusa Tenggara complained about the widespread rumour of child kidnapping around the city to the regional police chief, which was assured by the police as "only rumours". The police also clarified in 1 February 2023, there was no report of child kidnapping case in the city since early 2022.

On 23 February 2023, a rumour of child kidnapping in Wamena, Highland Papua, triggered a deadly riot resulting in 10 rioters dead, mostly killed by police; and two traders accused of kidnapping were also killed.

== See also ==
- 1998 Banyuwangi massacre
