= East Timor (province) =

Former province of Indonesia

Coordinates: 8.55°S 125.56°E

East Timor Timor Timur (Indonesian) Timor Lorosa'e (Tetun)
- 1975–1999
- Flag Coat of arms
- Motto: Houri Otas, Houri Wain, Oan Timor Asswa'in (Tetun) "From the past and from today, we are Timorese warriors"
- Location of East Timor Province
- Status: Province of Indonesia (de facto) Internationally unrecognized territory occupied by Indonesia (1976–1999) ^{[1]} Overseas province of Portugal (de jure)
- Capital and largest city: Dili
- Official languages: Indonesian
- Recognised regional languages: Tetum, Balinese, Bunak, Fataluku, Javanese, Sundanese, Uab Meto, other native languages
- Governor
  - 1976–1978 (first): Arnaldo dos Reis Araújo
  - 1992–1999 (last): José Abílio Osório Soares
- Vice Governor
  - 1976–1981 (first): Francisco Xavier Lopes da Cruz
  - 1998–1999 (last): Musiran Darmosuwito
- Legislature: East Timor Regional House of Representatives (DPRD Timor Timur)
- Historical era: Cold War, Post–Cold War era, New Order, Reform era
  - Indonesian invasion of East Timor: 7 December 1975
  - East Timor annexed by Indonesia: 17 May 1976
  - Santa Cruz massacre: 12 November 1991
  - Independence referendum: 30 August 1999
  - Indonesian annexation rescinded: 19 October 1999
  - UNTAET established: 25 October 1999

Area
  - Total: 15,007 km^{2} (5,794 sq mi)
  - Water (%): negligible

Population
  - 1980: 555,350
  - 1990: 747,750
- Currency: Indonesian rupiah (Rp) (IDR)
Preceded by	Succeeded by
Provisional Government of East Timor	United Nations Administered East Timor
- Today part of: Timor-Leste
- Notes: 1. East Timor was legalized by Indonesian law as the 27th province, but was seen by the UN and several countries (including Portugal) as a "military occupation" (see Indonesian occupation of East Timor). Thus, it was a Portuguese territory under Indonesian occupation from the standpoint of international law, but operated de facto as an Indonesian province and considered by Indonesia's own laws as a de jure province as well.

East Timor (Indonesian: Timor Timur) was a province of Indonesia between 1976 and 1999, during the Indonesian occupation of the country. Its territory corresponded to the previous Portuguese Timor and to the present-day independent country of Timor-Leste. It gained its independence as a UN-recognised sovereign state in September of 2002.

From 1702 to 1975, East Timor was an overseas territory of Portugal, called "Portuguese Timor". In 1974, Portugal initiated a gradual decolonisation process of its remaining overseas territories, including Portuguese Timor. During the process, a civil conflict between the different Timorese parties erupted. Indonesia invaded East Timor in 1975 and formally annexed the territory in 1976, declaring it Indonesia's 27th province and renaming it "Timor Timur". The United Nations, however, declared this occupation illegal, continuing to consider Portugal as the legitimate administering power of East Timor. East Timor voted for independence in UN-sponsored referendum in August 1999. Following the end of Indonesian occupation in October 1999, as well as a United Nations-administered transition period, East Timor became formally independent in May 2002 and adopted the official name of Timor-Leste.

== History ==
=== Indonesian invasion and occupation ===
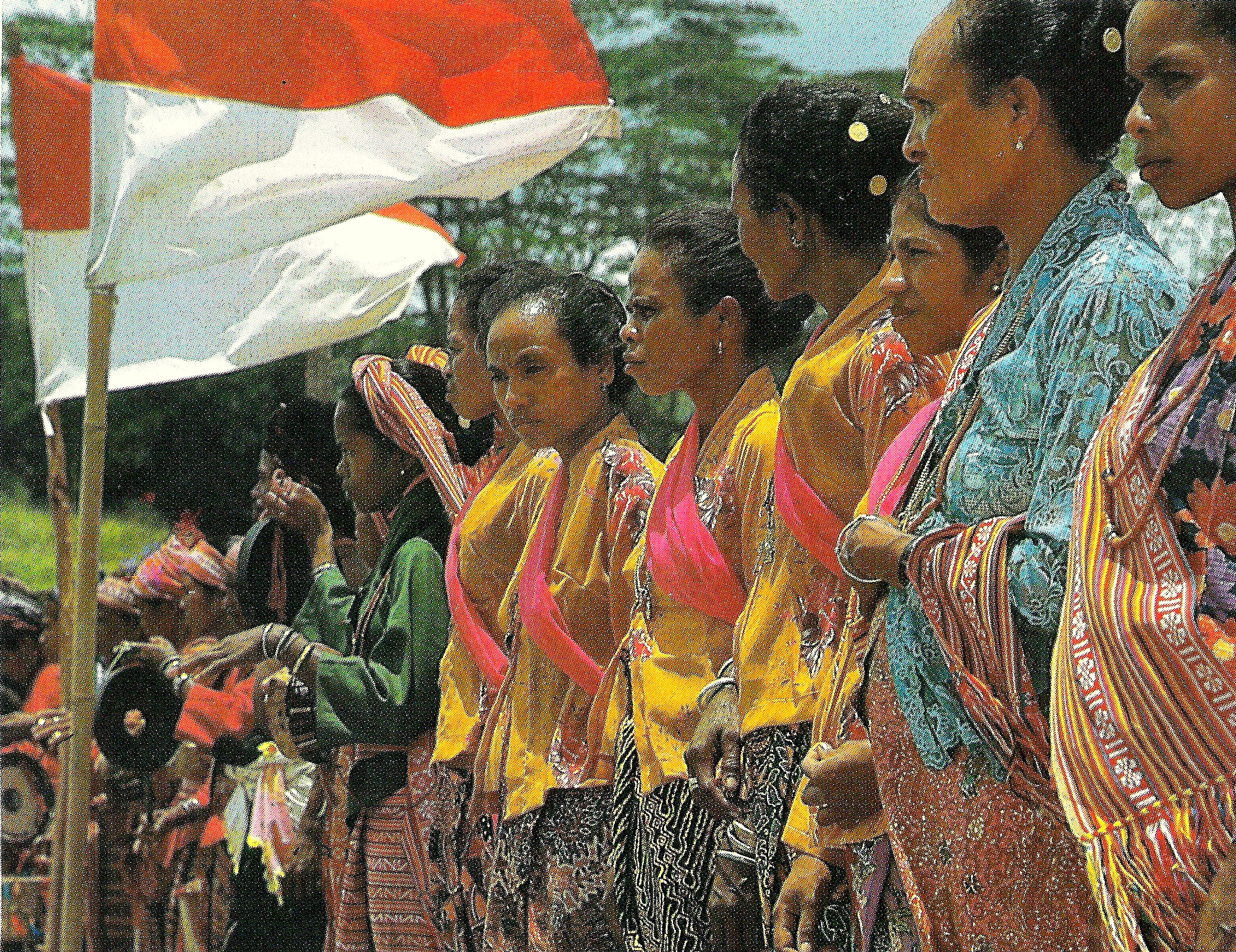
Timorese women with the Indonesian national flag

From 1702 to 1975, East Timor was a colony of Portugal, officially designated in later years as the Portuguese overseas province of Timor, commonly referred to as "Portuguese Timor." Portuguese control was largely confined to coastal areas until the late 19th century, when colonial administration was consolidated in the interior through military campaigns. The colony remained under Portuguese rule with minimal economic development, relying primarily on coffee exports.

In April 1974, the Carnation Revolution in Portugal led to a shift in government policy, initiating a decolonization process for its overseas territories, including Portuguese Timor. Various Timorese political parties emerged, including the left-wing Revolutionary Front for an Independent East Timor (Fretilin), the pro-integration Timorese Democratic Union (UDT), and the APODETI (Timorese Popular Democratic Association) party, which advocated integration with Indonesia. Tensions between Fretilin and UDT escalated into a civil war in August 1975, with Fretilin emerging victorious and gaining control of the capital, Dili. As a result, the Portuguese governor and his staff relocated their seat of administration to Atauro Island.

On 28 November 1975, Fretilin unilaterally declared the independence of the Democratic Republic of East Timor (Portuguese: República Democrática de Timor-Leste) from Portugal. Portugal did not recognize the declaration and the Portuguese governor continued to formally administer the province from Atauro, albeit with limited authority over the rest of East Timor.

Nine days later, on 7 December 1975, Indonesia began an invasion of East Timor proper. Following the invasion, the Portuguese governor and his staff left Atauro aboard two Portuguese warships. As a statement of Portuguese sovereignty, Portugal maintained those warships patrolling the waters around East Timor until May 1976.

Indonesia established a Provisional Government of East Timor in December 1975 and formally annexed East Timor as its 27th province on 17 July 1976, changing its official name to Timor Timur, the Indonesian translation of "East Timor". The use of the Portuguese language was then forbidden, as it was seen as a relic of colonisation.

The annexation was not recognised by the United Nations and was only recognised by one country Australia in 1979. The United Nations continued to recognise Portugal as the legitimate administering power of East Timor.

=== Referendum and independence ===
An agreement was reached by the governments of Portugal and Indonesia in May 1999 to offer the people of East Timor referendum on whether to remain in Indonesia as the Special Autonomous Region of East Timor or to become an independent country. In the referendum, held in August 1999, an overwhelming majority voted for independence. Immediately following the referendum, Pro-Indonesia militias commenced a scorched earth campaign triggering the 1999 East Timorese crisis. An International Force for East Timor was deployed to the territory to bring the violence to an end. Indonesia formally rescinded its annexation on 19 October 1999 and a United Nations transitional administration was subsequently established on 25 October 1999 by Security Council Resolution 1272 to administer the territory until independence on 22 May 2002.

== Government ==
As with all provinces of Indonesia, executive authority was vested in a Governor and Vice-Governor elected by the Regional House of Representatives every five years. Legislative authority was vested in the DPRD, both in province and regency level.

=== Governors ===
Below are governors of East Timor Province from 1976 to 1999:

Governors of Timor Timur during Indonesian occupation
No.	Portrait	Officeholders	Tenure		Notes	Head of state (Term)
No.	Portrait	Officeholders	From	Until	Notes	Head of state (Term)
130		Arnaldo dos Reis Araújo (Independent); Governor	3 August 1976	19 September 1978		Soeharto; President of Indonesia (27 March 1968 – 21 May 1998) B. J. Habibie; President of Indonesia (21 May 1998 – 20 October 1999)
131		Guilherme Maria Gonçalves (APODETI); Governor	19 September 1978	18 September 1981		Soeharto; President of Indonesia (27 March 1968 – 21 May 1998) B. J. Habibie; President of Indonesia (21 May 1998 – 20 October 1999)
132		Mário Viegas Carrascalão (Golkar); Governor	18 September 1981	18 September 1992		Soeharto; President of Indonesia (27 March 1968 – 21 May 1998) B. J. Habibie; President of Indonesia (21 May 1998 – 20 October 1999)
133		José Abílio Osório Soares (Golkar); Governor	18 September 1992	19 October 1999		Soeharto; President of Indonesia (27 March 1968 – 21 May 1998) B. J. Habibie; President of Indonesia (21 May 1998 – 20 October 1999)

=== Regional House of Representatives ===
Composition of the Regional House of Representatives between 1980 and 1999:

Regional House of Representatives of Timor Timur
Year	PPP	Golkar	PDI	ABRI	Total
1980	0	25	0	0	25
1981	0	24	0	0	24
1982	0	32	0	4	36
1987	0	34	2	9	45
1988	0	34	2	9	45
1989	0	33	2	9	44
1990	0	34	2	9	45
1991	0	34	2	9	45
1992	2	29	5	9	45
1997	1	30	5	9	45

== Administrative divisions ==
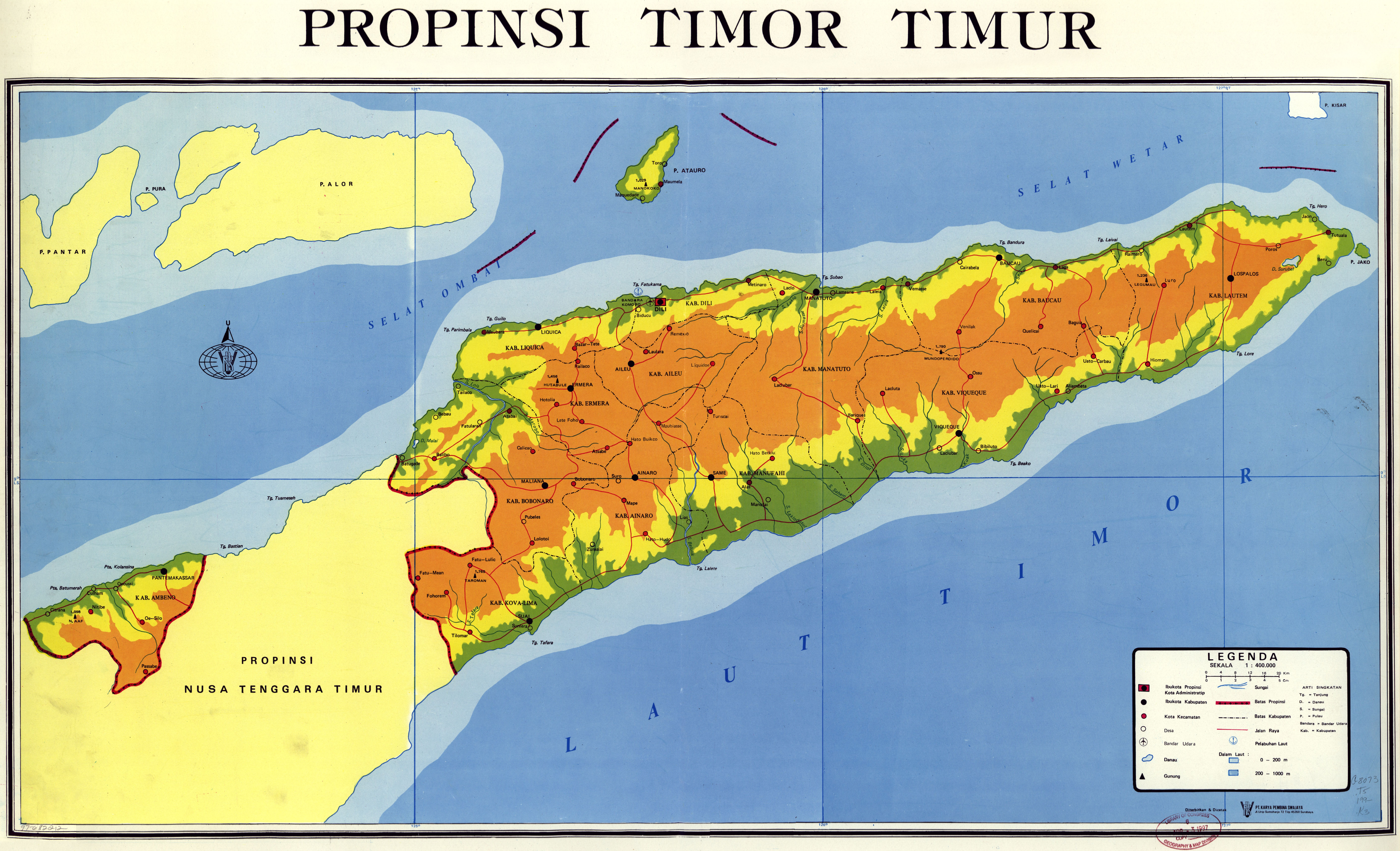
Map of East Timor province, c. 1990s

The province was divided into thirteen regencies (kabupaten) and one administrative city (kota administratif). These are listed below along with their districts (kecamatan), per December 1981:

- Dili Administrative City, served as the capital of East Timor, also the capital and part of Dili Regency, consisted of East Dili (Dili Timur) and West Dili (Dili Barat) districts, which formerly belonged to Dili Regency before the creation of the administrative city status in November 1981.
- Dili Regency, consisted of Dili Administrative City, Atauro and Metinaro districts.
- Baucau Regency, with its capital at Baucau, consisted of Baucau, Vemasse, Laga, Baguia, Venilale, and Quelicai districts.
- Manatuto Regency, with its capital at Manatuto, consisted of Manatuto, Laclubar, Barique, Laclo, and Laleia districts.
- Lautem Regency, with its capital at Lospalos, consisted of Lospalos, Luro, Iliomar, Lautem, and Tutuala districts.
- Viqueque Regency, with its capital at Viqueque, consisted of Viqueque, Ossu, Uato-Lari, Lacluta, and Uato-Carbau districts.
- Ainaro Regency, with its capital at Ainaro, consisted of Ainaro, Maubisse, Hatu-Bullico, Hato-Hudo, and Mape districts.
- Manufahi Regency, with its capital at Same, consisted of Same, Alas, Fato-Berliu, and Turiscai districts.
- Kova-Lima Regency, with its capital at Suai, consisted of Suai, Tilomar, Fohorem, Fatu-Lulic, and Fatu-Mean districts.
- Ambeno Regency, with its capital at Pante-Makassar, consisted of Pante-Makassar, Oe-Silo, Nitibe, and Passabe districts.
- Bobonaro Regency, with its capital at Maliana, consisted of Maliana, Bobonaro, Lolotoi, Atabai, Balibo, and Cailaco districts.
- Liquica Regency, with its capital at Liquica, consisted of Liquica, Bazar-Tete, and Maubara districts.
- Ermera Regency, with its capital at Gleno, consisted of Ermera, Atsabe, Hatolia, Lete-Foho, and Railaco districts.
- Aileu Regency, with its capital at Aileu, consisted of Aileu, Remexio, Laulara, and Lequidoe districts.

== See also ==
- Indonesian occupation of East Timor
- 1999 East Timorese crisis
- East Timor–Indonesia relations
