= Hatulia B Administrative Post =

Administrative post in Ermera Municipality, East Timor

Hatulia B
- Administrative Post
- Posto Administrativo de Hatulia B (Portuguese); Postu administrativu Hatólia B (Tetum)
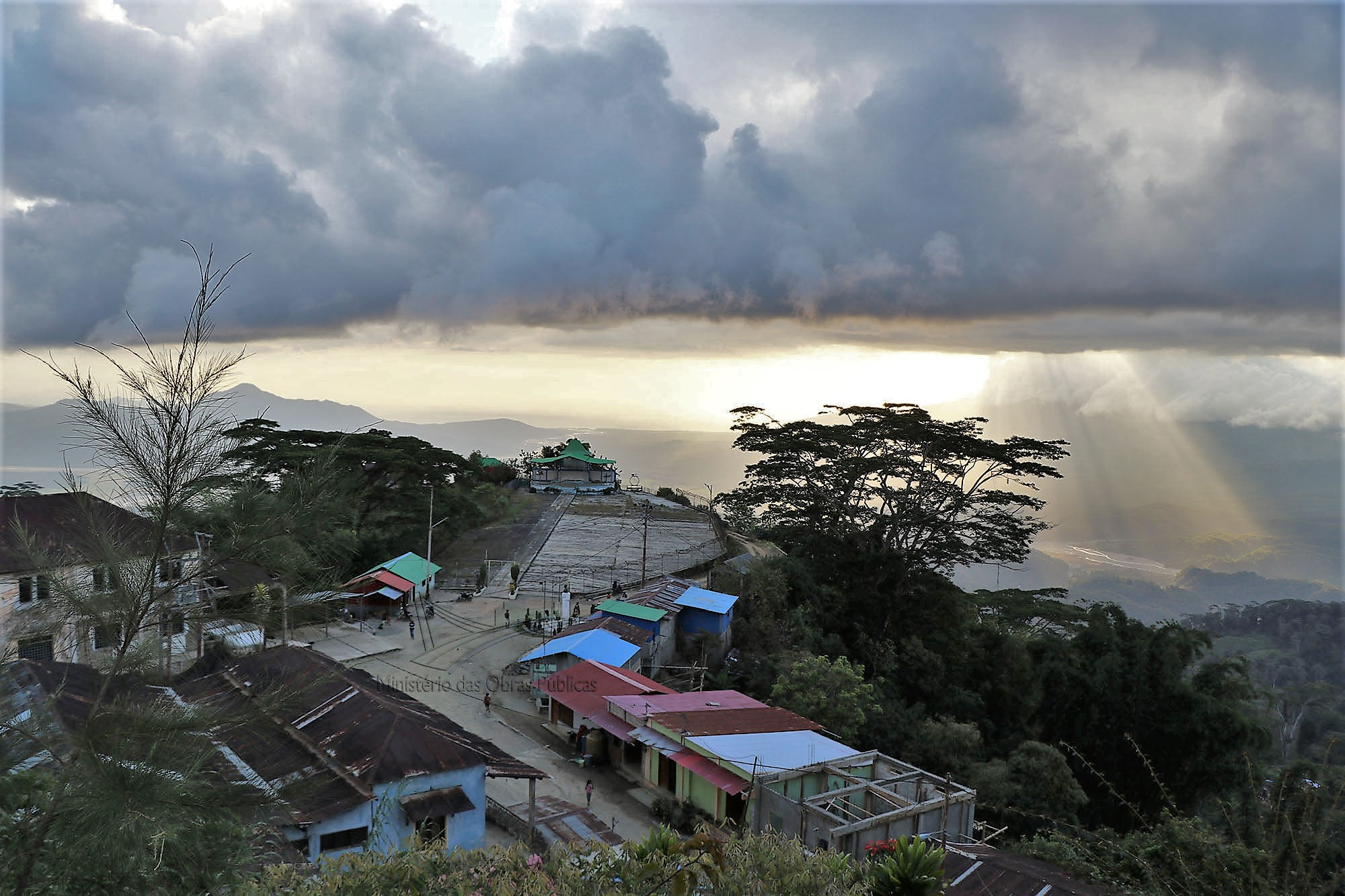
- Fatubessi, Hatulia B

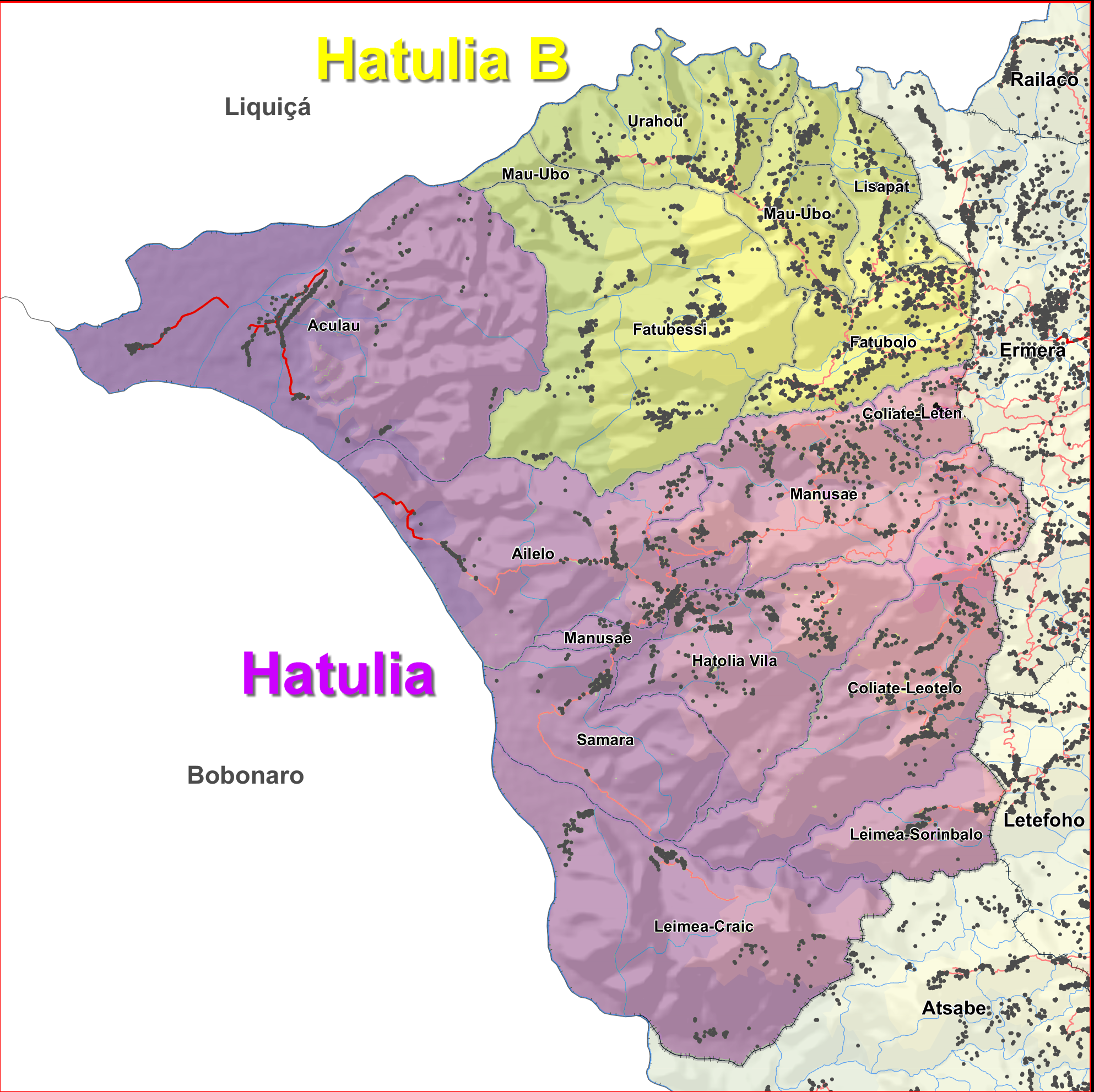
- Map of Hatulia and Hatulia B

- Location within East Timor
- Coordinates: 8°45′S 125°20′E
- Country: East Timor
- Municipality: Ermera
- Established: 1 January 2022
- Sucos: Fatubessi; Fatubolo; Lisapat; Mau-Ubo; Urahou

Area
  - Total: 79.08 km^{2} (30.53 sq mi)

Population (2022)
  - Total: 21,479
  - Density: 271.6/km^{2} (703.5/sq mi)
- Time zone: UTC+09:00 (TLT)

Hatulia B, officially Hatulia B Administrative Post (Portuguese: Posto Administrativo de Hatulia B, Tetum: Postu administrativu Hatólia B), is an administrative post in Ermera municipality, East Timor. It was separated from Hatulia Administrative Post with effect from 1 January 2022.
