= Ermera =

Town in Timor-Leste

Ermera Vila Ermera
- City
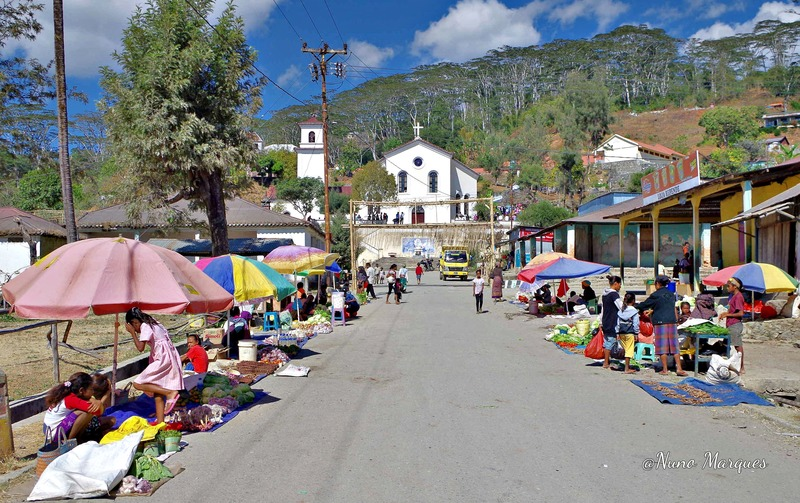
- Main street and church of Ermera

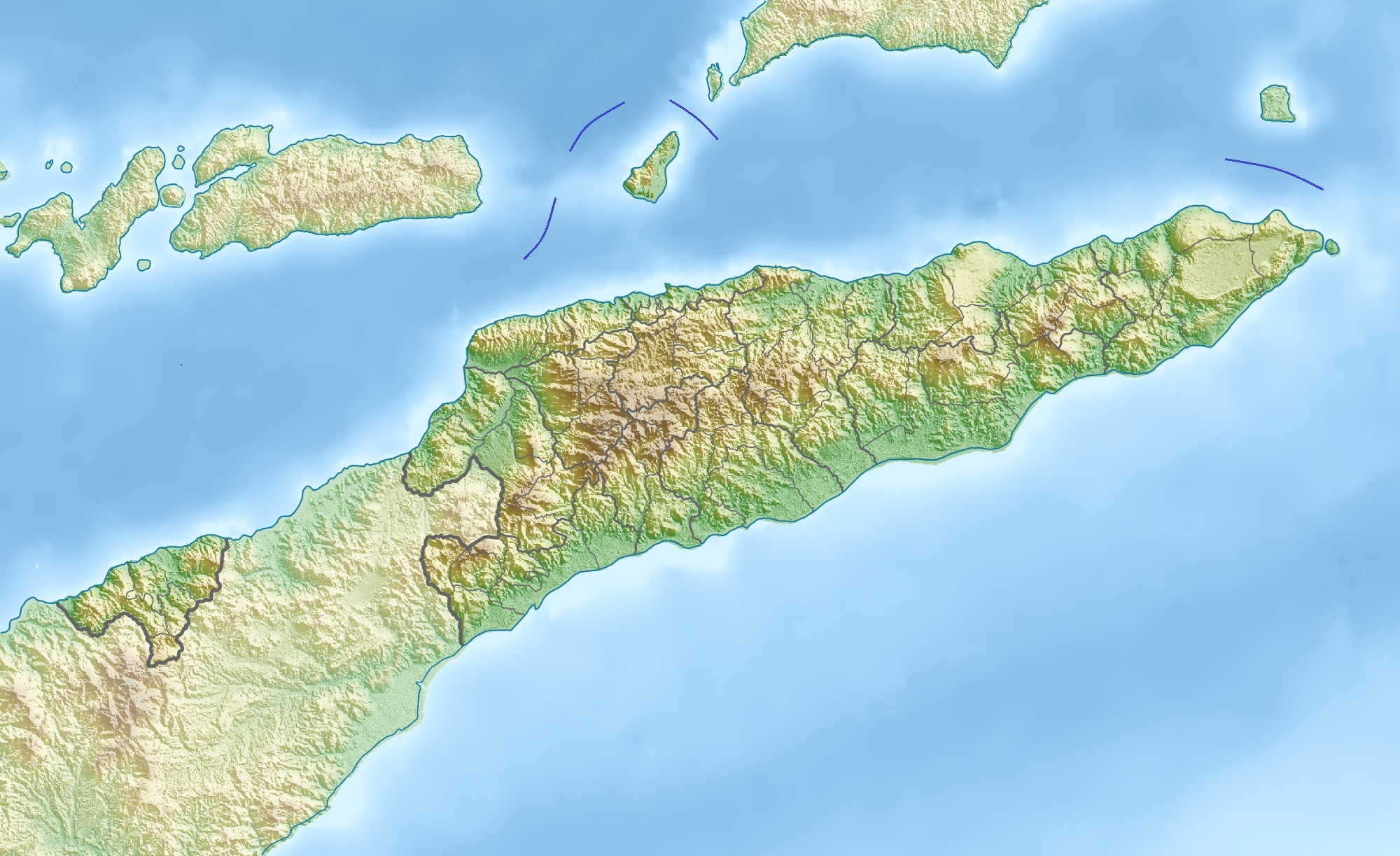
- Location in Timor-Leste
- Coordinates: 8°45′8″S 125°23′49″E
- Country: Timor-Leste
- Municipality: Ermera
- Administrative post: Ermera
- Suco: Poetete
- Elevation: 1,195 m (3,921 ft)

Population (2022 census)
  - Total: 8,904
- Time zone: UTC+09:00 (TLT)

Ermera (Vila Ermera) is a city in Timor-Leste and a former capital of the East Timorese community, Ermera. The population was 8,904 in 2022.

== Etymology ==
Ermera, which is Mambai for red water.
