= Railaco Administrative Post =

Administrative post in Ermera Municipality, Timor-Leste

Railaco
- Administrative Post
- Posto Administrativo de Railaco (Portuguese); Postu administrativu Railaku (Tetum)
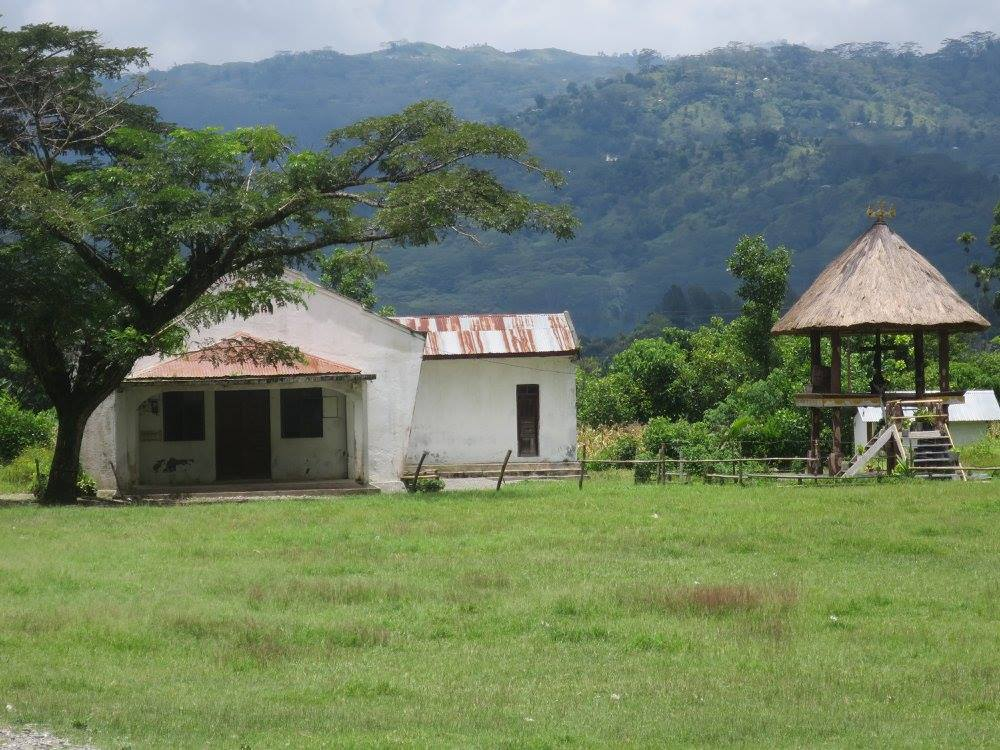
- A church in Fatuquero

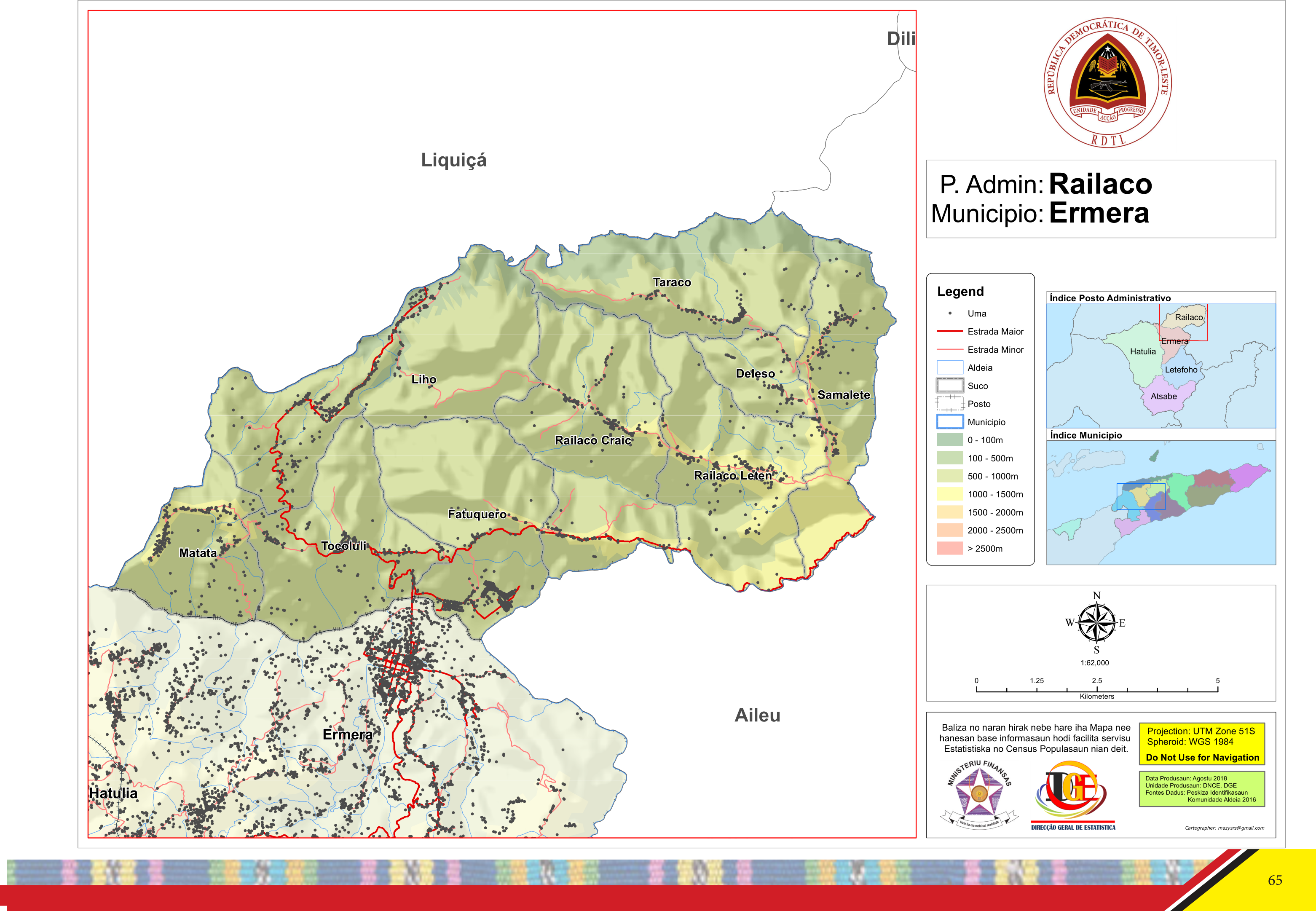
- Official map

- Location within East Timor
- Coordinates: 8°40′S 125°25′E
- Country: Timor-Leste
- Municipality: Ermera
- Seat: Liho
- Sucos: Deleso; Fatuquero; Liho; Matata; Railaco Craic; Railaco Leten; Samalete; Taraco; Tocoluli

Area
  - Total: 92.2 km^{2} (35.6 sq mi)

Population (2015 census)
  - Total: 12,128
  - Density: 132/km^{2} (341/sq mi)

Households (2015 census)
  - Total: 1,950
- Time zone: UTC+09:00 (TLT)

Railaco, officially Railaco Administrative Post (Portuguese: Posto Administrativo de Railaco, Tetum: Postu administrativu Railaku), is an administrative post (and was formerly a subdistrict) in Ermera municipality, Timor-Leste. Its seat or administrative centre is Liho, and its population at the 2004 census was 9,293.

Climate

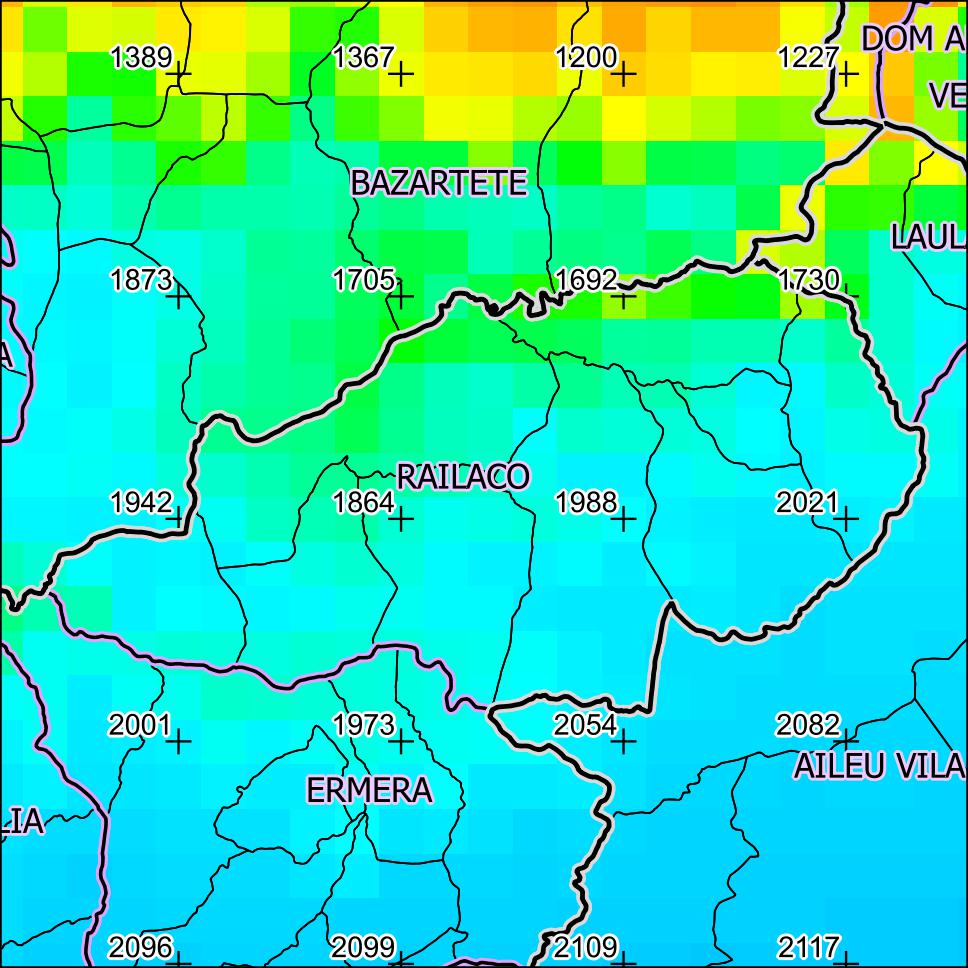
Annual rainfall (2000)

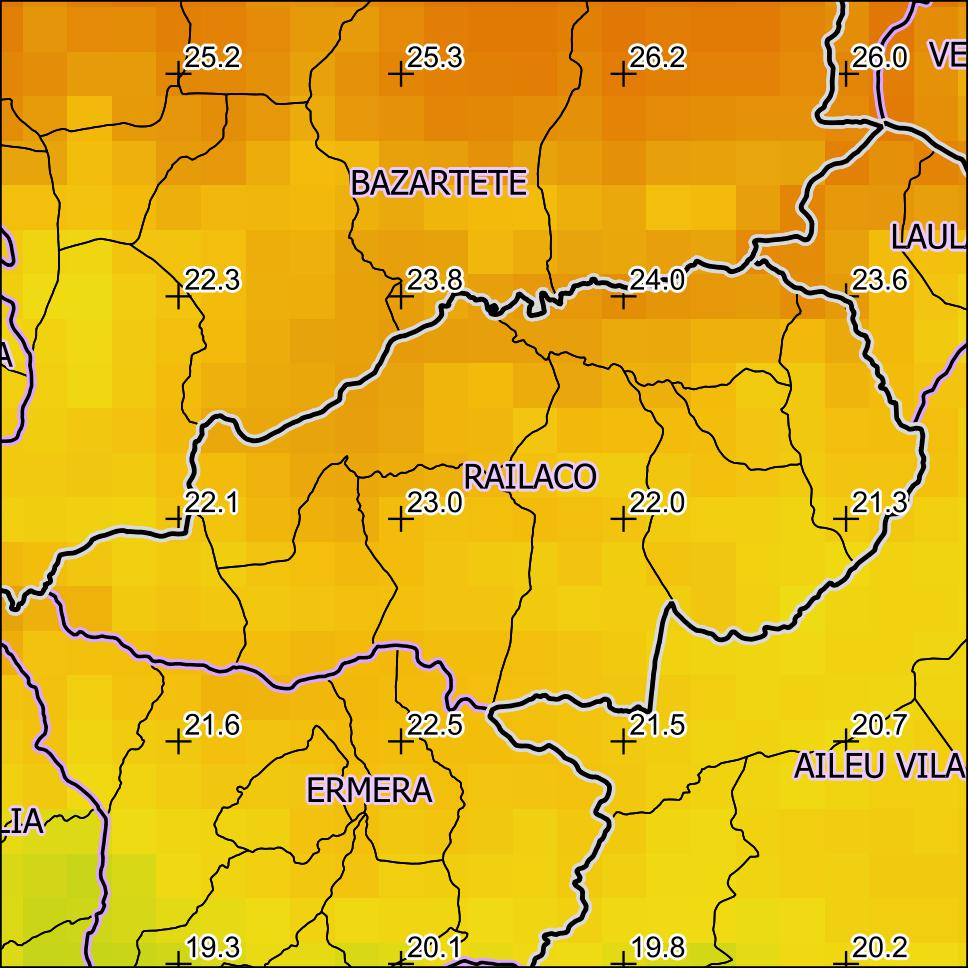
Temperature (2000)
