= Gleno =

- City
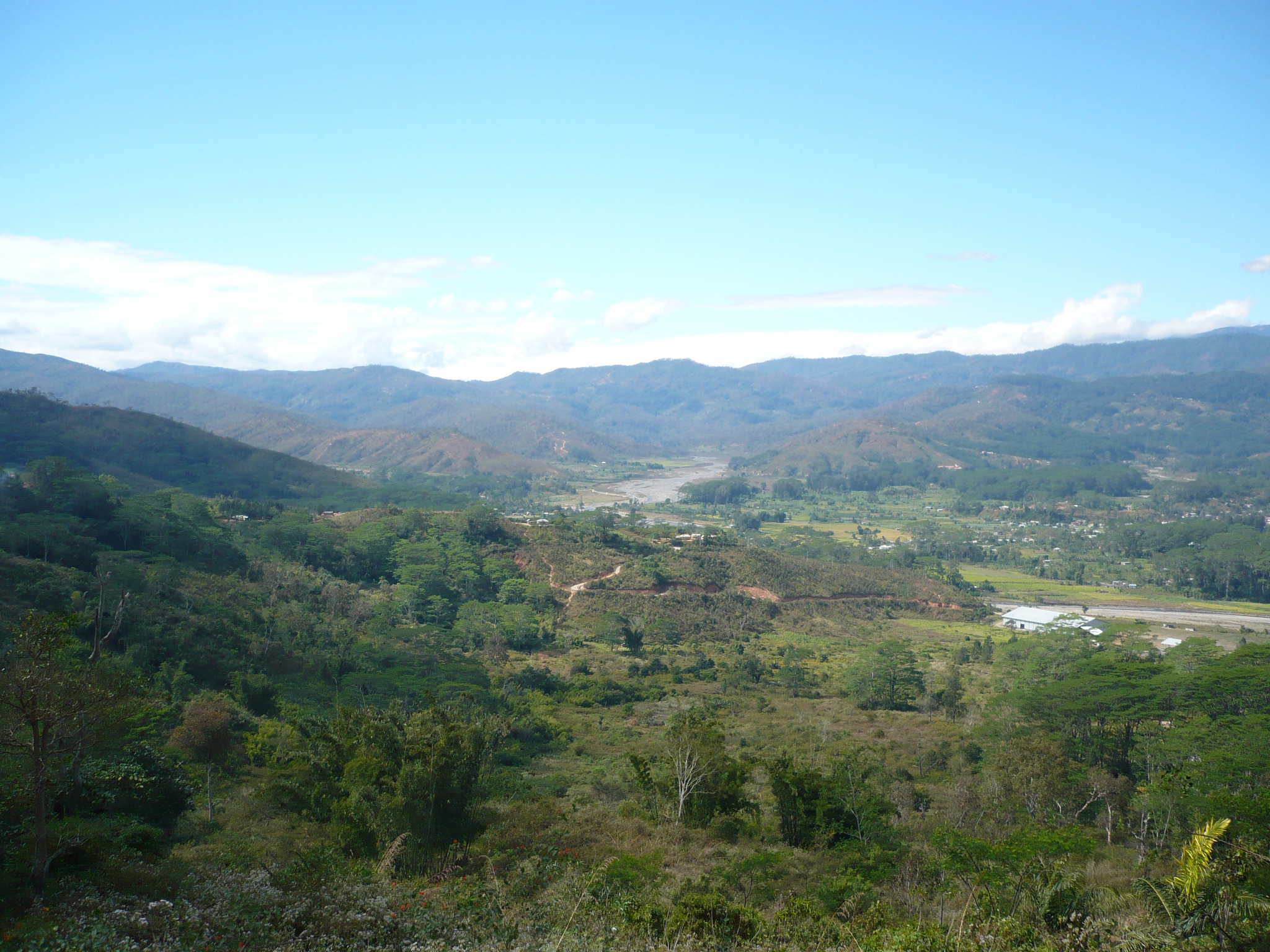

- Location in Timor-Leste
- Coordinates: 8°43′26″S 125°26′10″E
- Country: Timor-Leste
- Municipality: Ermera
- Administrative post: Ermera
- Suco: Riheu
- Elevation: 882 m (2,894 ft)

Population (2010)
  - Total: 8,133
- Time zone: UTC+09:00 (TLT)
- Climate: Aw

Gleno is a city in Timor-Leste, 30 kilometres (19 mi) to the southwest of Dili, the national capital. It is in the suco of Riheu (Administrative post Ermera). Gleno has a population of 8,133 (2010). It lies 882 metres (2,894 ft) above sea level.

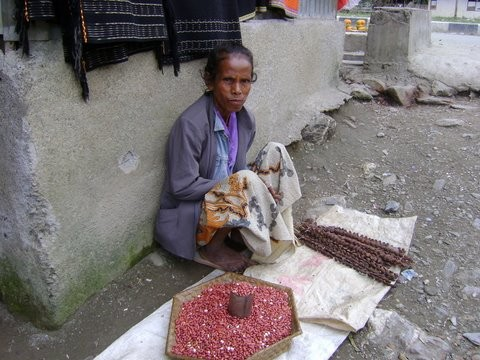
Market woman in Gleno (2010)

Gleno is the capital of the municipality of Ermera.

Being near the national capital, Gleno suffered during the intimidation campaign around the time of the referendum for East Timorese independence in 1999.

== Climate ==
Gleno has a tropical savanna climate (Köppen Aw), bordering on a tropical monsoon climate (Am), moderated by elevation. The dry season peaks in August and September, whilst the wet season extends from November to May with a peak from December to February. Gleno is substantially cooler and much wetter than Dili, which receives less than half as much rainfall.

Climate data for Gleno
Month	Jan	Feb	Mar	Apr	May	Jun	Jul	Aug	Sep	Oct	Nov	Dec	Year
Mean daily maximum °C (°F)	26.2 (79.2)	26.3 (79.3)	27.0 (80.6)	27.0 (80.6)	26.4 (79.5)	25.4 (77.7)	25.2 (77.4)	25.9 (78.6)	26.9 (80.4)	28.1 (82.6)	28.1 (82.6)	27.0 (80.6)	26.6 (79.9)
Daily mean °C (°F)	23.4 (74.1)	23.4 (74.1)	23.6 (74.5)	23.5 (74.3)	22.9 (73.2)	22.0 (71.6)	21.4 (70.5)	21.7 (71.1)	22.4 (72.3)	23.6 (74.5)	24.2 (75.6)	23.8 (74.8)	23.0 (73.4)
Mean daily minimum °C (°F)	20.7 (69.3)	20.5 (68.9)	20.3 (68.5)	20.0 (68.0)	19.4 (66.9)	18.6 (65.5)	17.7 (63.9)	17.5 (63.5)	18.0 (64.4)	19.1 (66.4)	20.4 (68.7)	20.7 (69.3)	19.4 (66.9)
Average rainfall mm (inches)	317 (12.5)	323 (12.7)	219 (8.6)	182 (7.2)	126 (5.0)	81 (3.2)	60 (2.4)	22 (0.9)	18 (0.7)	61 (2.4)	191 (7.5)	318 (12.5)	1,918 (75.6)
Source: Climate-Data.org

== Other places ==
Gleno is also a small village in County Antrim, Northern Ireland.
