= Atsabe Administrative Post =

Administrative post in Ermera Municipality, Timor-Leste

Atsabe
- Administrative Post
- Posto Administrativo de Atsabe (Portuguese); Postu administrativu Atsabe (Tetum)
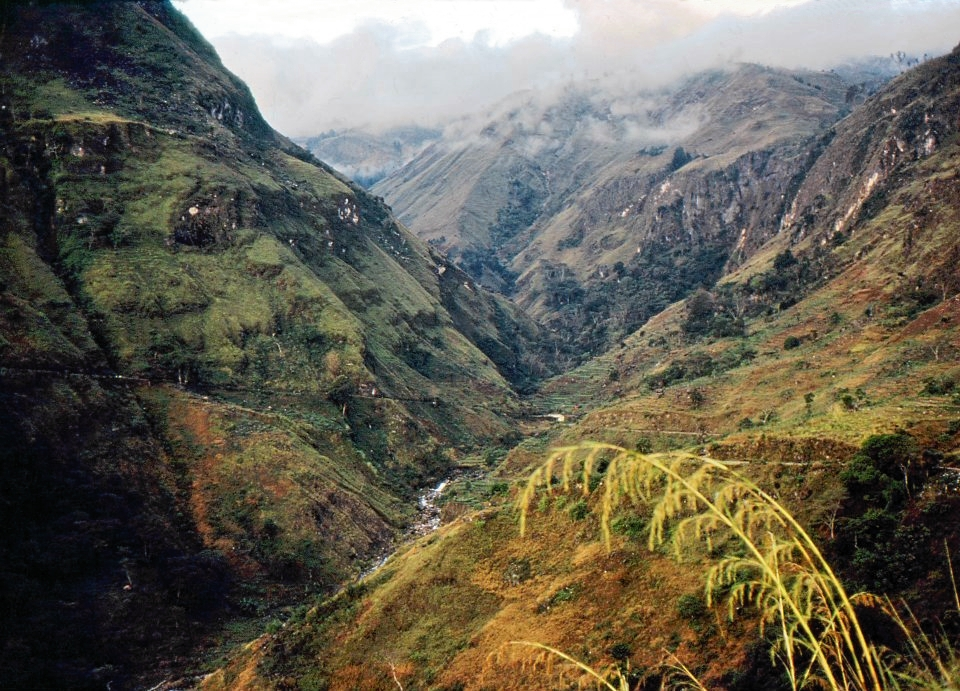
- Atsabe mountains

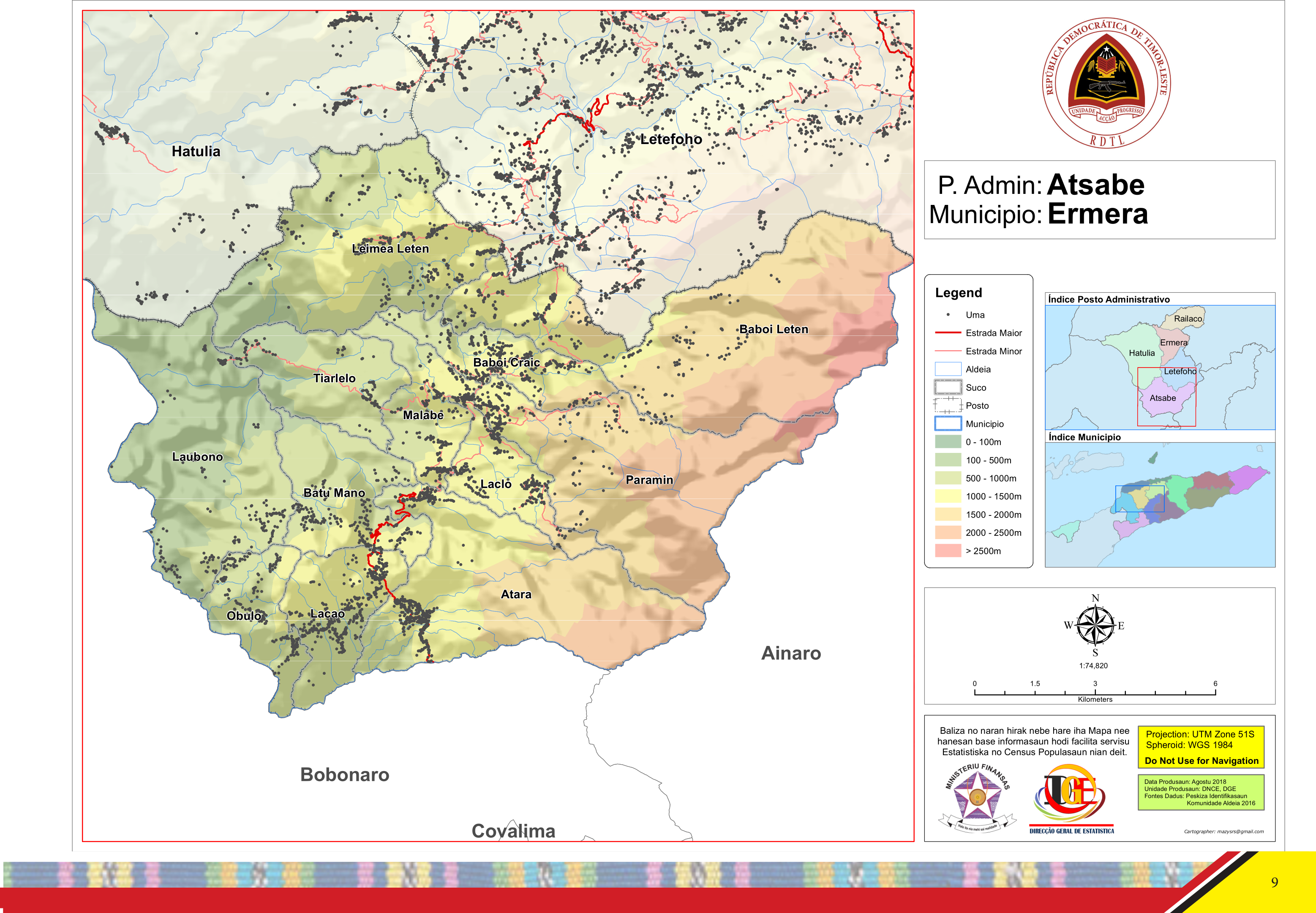
- Official map

- Location within East Timor
- Coordinates: 8°56′S 125°24′E
- Country: Timor-Leste
- Municipality: Ermera
- Seat: Laclo
- Sucos: Atara; Baboi Craic; Baboi Leten; Batu Mano; Lacao; Laclo; Laubono; Leimea Leten; Malabe; Obulo; Parami; Tiarlelo

Area
  - Total: 164.4 km^{2} (63.5 sq mi)

Population (2015 census)
  - Total: 18,563
  - Density: 112.9/km^{2} (292.4/sq mi)

Households (2015 census)
  - Total: 3,180
- Time zone: UTC+09:00 (TLT)

Atsabe, officially Atsabe Administrative Post (Portuguese: Posto Administrativo de Atsabe, Tetum: Postu administrativu Atsabe), is an administrative post in Ermera municipality, Timor-Leste. Its seat or administrative centre is Laclo, and its population at the 2004 census was 16,037.
