= List of municipalities of Timor-Leste by Human Development Index =

This is a list of municipalities of Timor-Leste by Human Development Index as of 2023, including the special administrative region of Oecusse.

Rank	Municipality	HDI (2023)
High human development
1	Dili	0.787
Medium human development
2	Liquiçá	0.688
–	Timor-Leste (average)	0.688
3	Manufahi	0.676
4	Manatuto	0.678
5	Covalima	0.672
6	Aileu	0.688
7	Lautém	0.659
8	Baucau	0.661
9	Bobonaro	0.650
10	Viqueque	0.658
11	Ainaro	0.610
12	Ermera	0.605
13	Oecusse (SAR)	0.606
