= Bobonaro Administrative Post =

Administrative post in Bobonaro Municipality, Timor-Leste

Bobonaro
- Administrative Post
- Posto Administrativo de Bobonaro (Portuguese); Postu administrativu Bobonaru (Tetum)
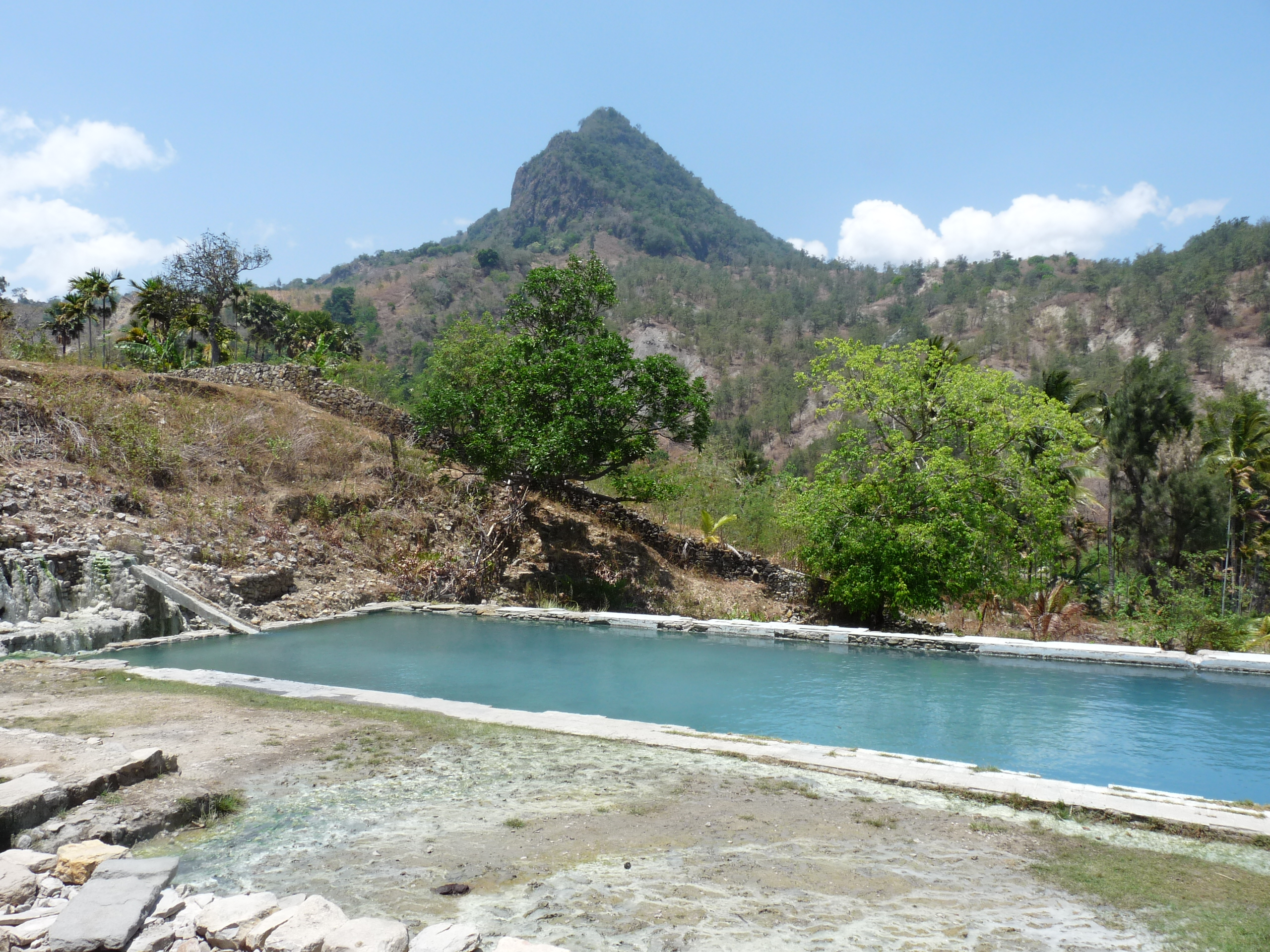
- Marobo Hot Springs

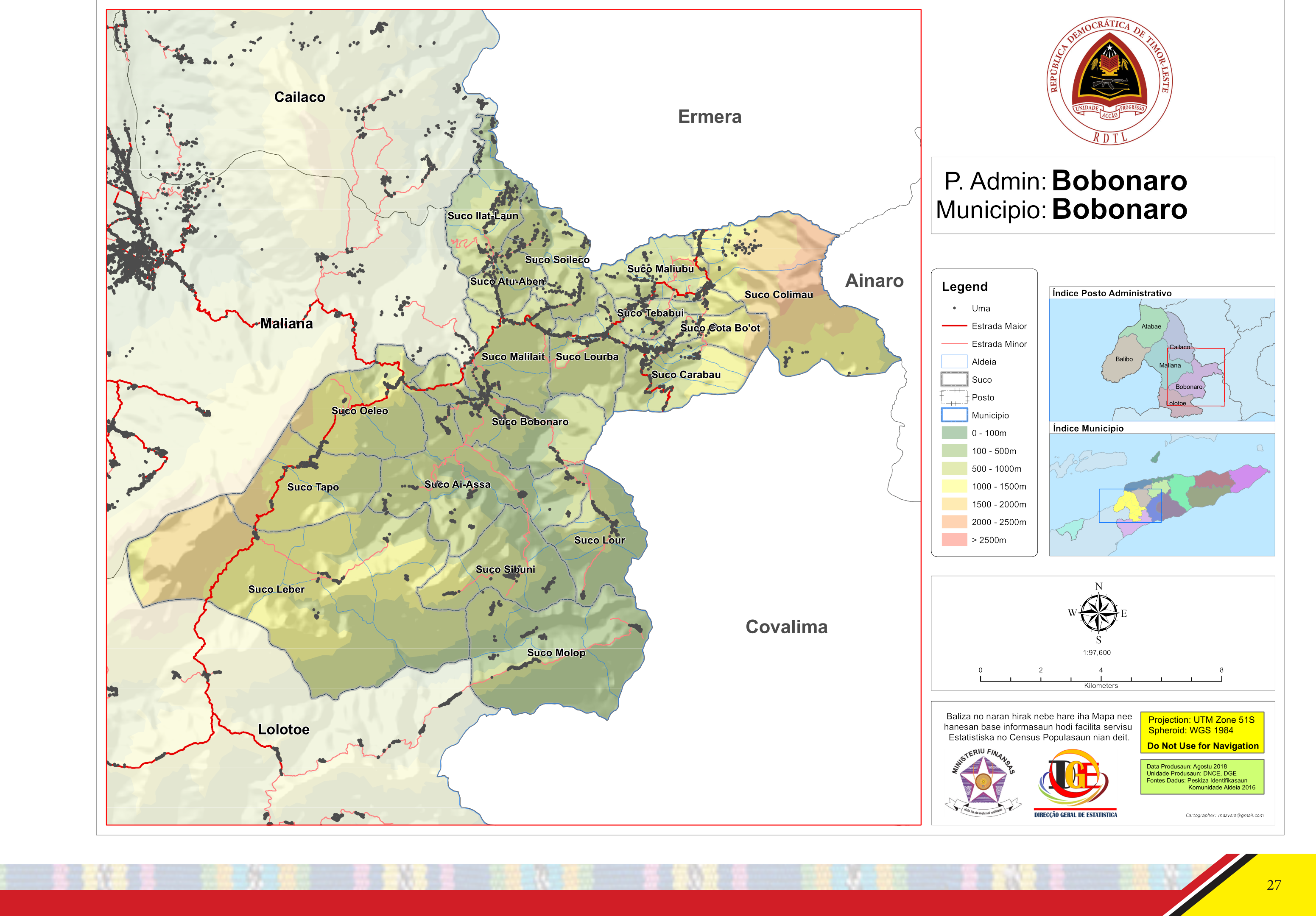
- Official map

- Location within East Timor
- Coordinates: 9°2′S 125°20′E
- Country: Timor-Leste
- Municipality: Bobonaro
- Seat: Bobonaro
- Sucos: Ai-Assa; Atu-Aben; Bobonaro; Carabau; Colimau; Cota Bo'ot; Ilat-Laun; Leber; Lour; Lourba; Malilait; Maliubu; Molop; Oeleo; Sibuni; Soileco; Tapo; Tebabui

Area
  - Total: 212.5 km^{2} (82.0 sq mi)

Population (2015 census)
  - Total: 24,719
  - Density: 116.3/km^{2} (301.3/sq mi)

Households (2015 census)
  - Total: 4,467
- Time zone: UTC+09:00 (TLT)

Bobonaro, officially Bobonaro Administrative Post (Portuguese: Posto Administrativo de Bobonaro, Tetum: Postu administrativu Bobonaru), is an administrative post (and was formerly a subdistrict) in Bobonaro municipality, Timor-Leste. Its seat or administrative centre is Bobonaro, and its population at the 2010 census was 23,108.
