= Lolotoe Administrative Post =

Administrative post in Bobonaro Municipality, Timor-Leste

Lolotoe
- Administrative Post
- Posto Administrativo de Lolotoe (Portuguese); Postu administrativu Lolo-Toe (Tetum)
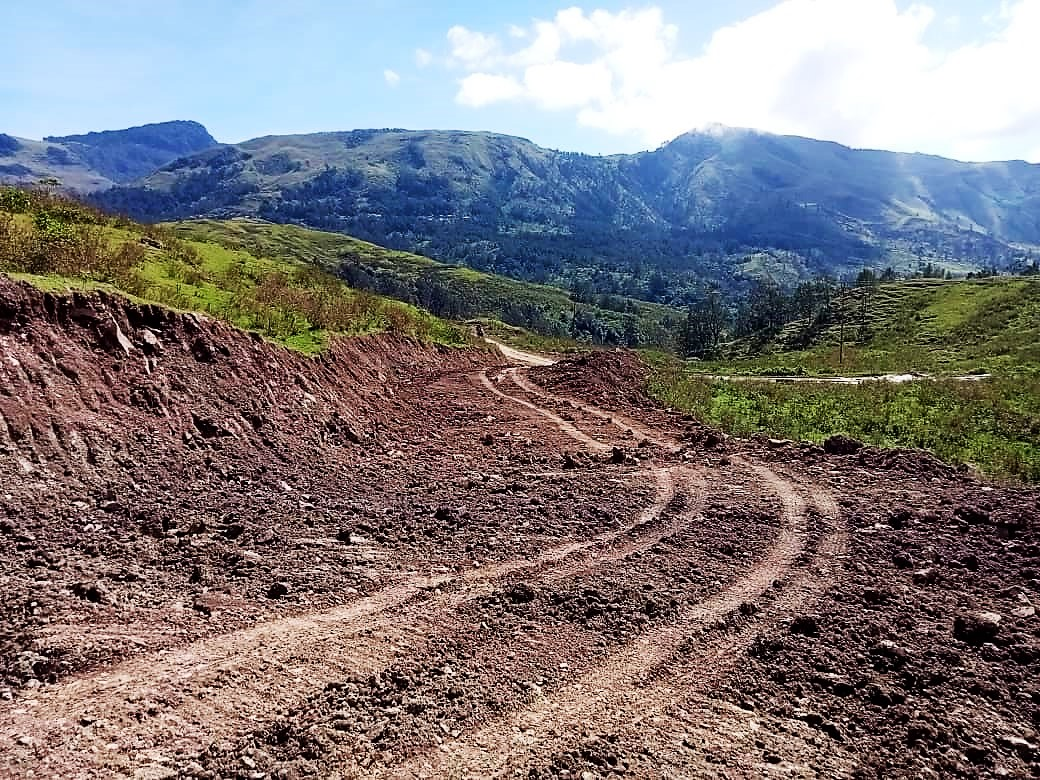
- Suco Lontas in July

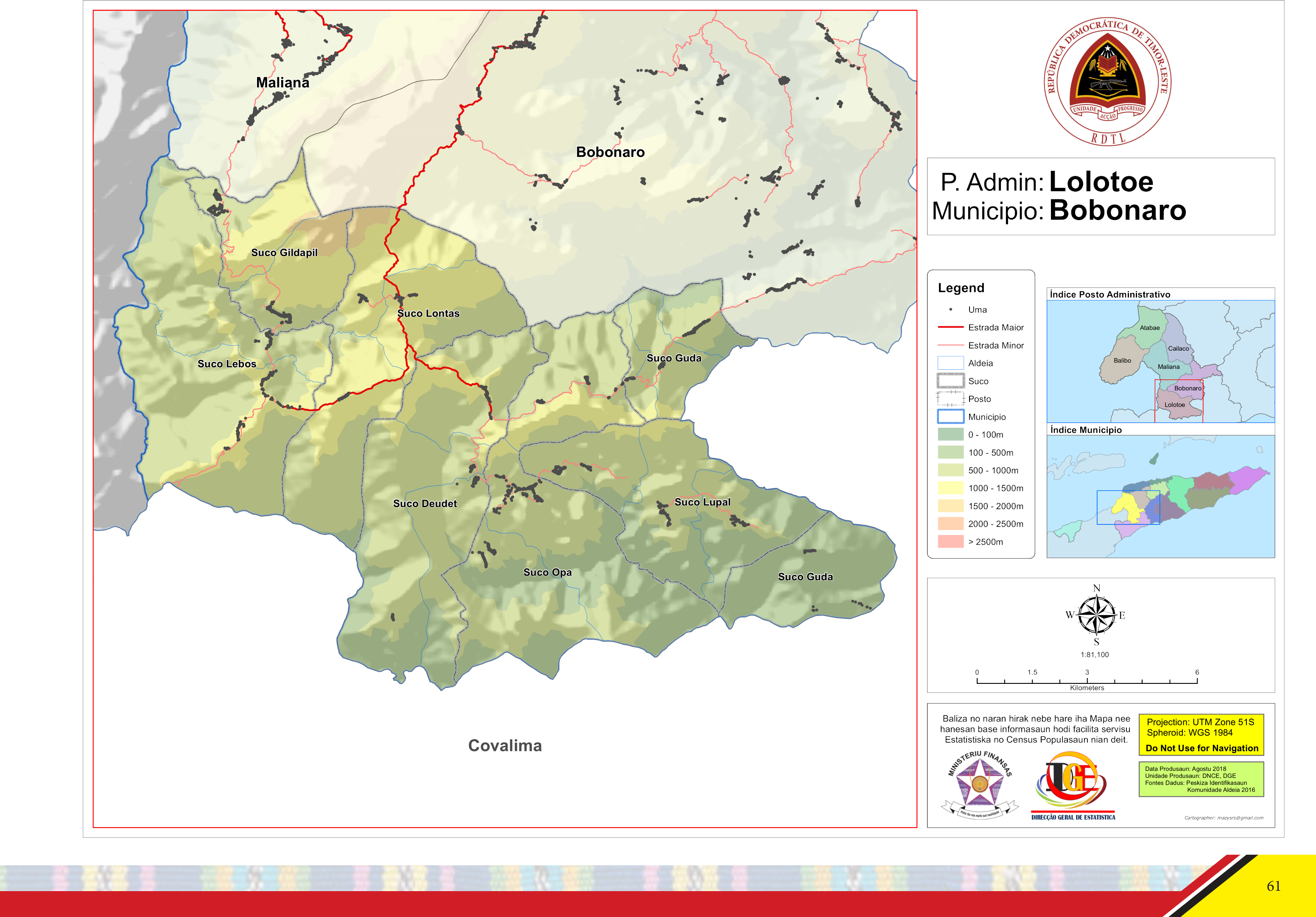
- Official map

- Location within East Timor
- Coordinates: 9°10′S 125°16′E
- Country: Timor-Leste
- Municipality: Bobonaro
- Seat: Deudet
- Sucos: Deudet; Gildapil; Guda; Lebos; Lontas; Lupal; Opa

Area
  - Total: 172.7 km^{2} (66.7 sq mi)

Population (2015 census)
  - Total: 6,845
  - Density: 39.64/km^{2} (102.7/sq mi)

Households (2015 census)
  - Total: 1,426
- Time zone: UTC+09:00 (TLT)

Lolotoe, officially Lolotoe Administrative Post (Portuguese: Posto Administrativo de Lolotoe, Tetum: Postu administrativu Lolo-Toe), is an administrative post (and was formerly a subdistrict) in Bobonaro municipality, Timor-Leste. Its seat or administrative centre is Deudet.
