= Vemasse Administrative Post =

Administrative post in Baucau Municipality, East Timor

Vemasse
- Administrative Post
- Posto Administrativo de Vemasse (Portuguese); Postu administrativu Vemasi (Tetun)
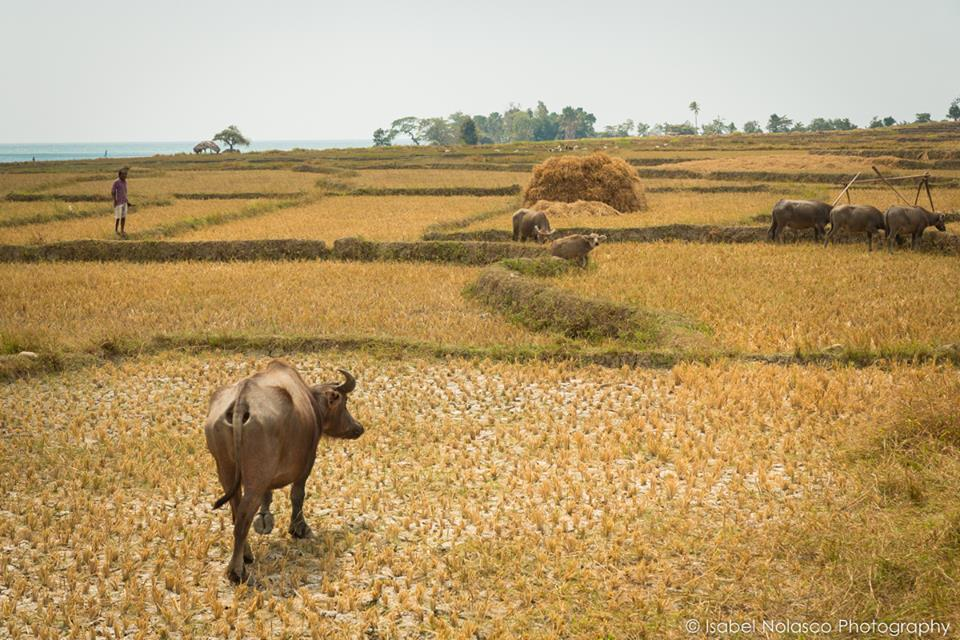
- Buffalo on a paddy field in Vemasse

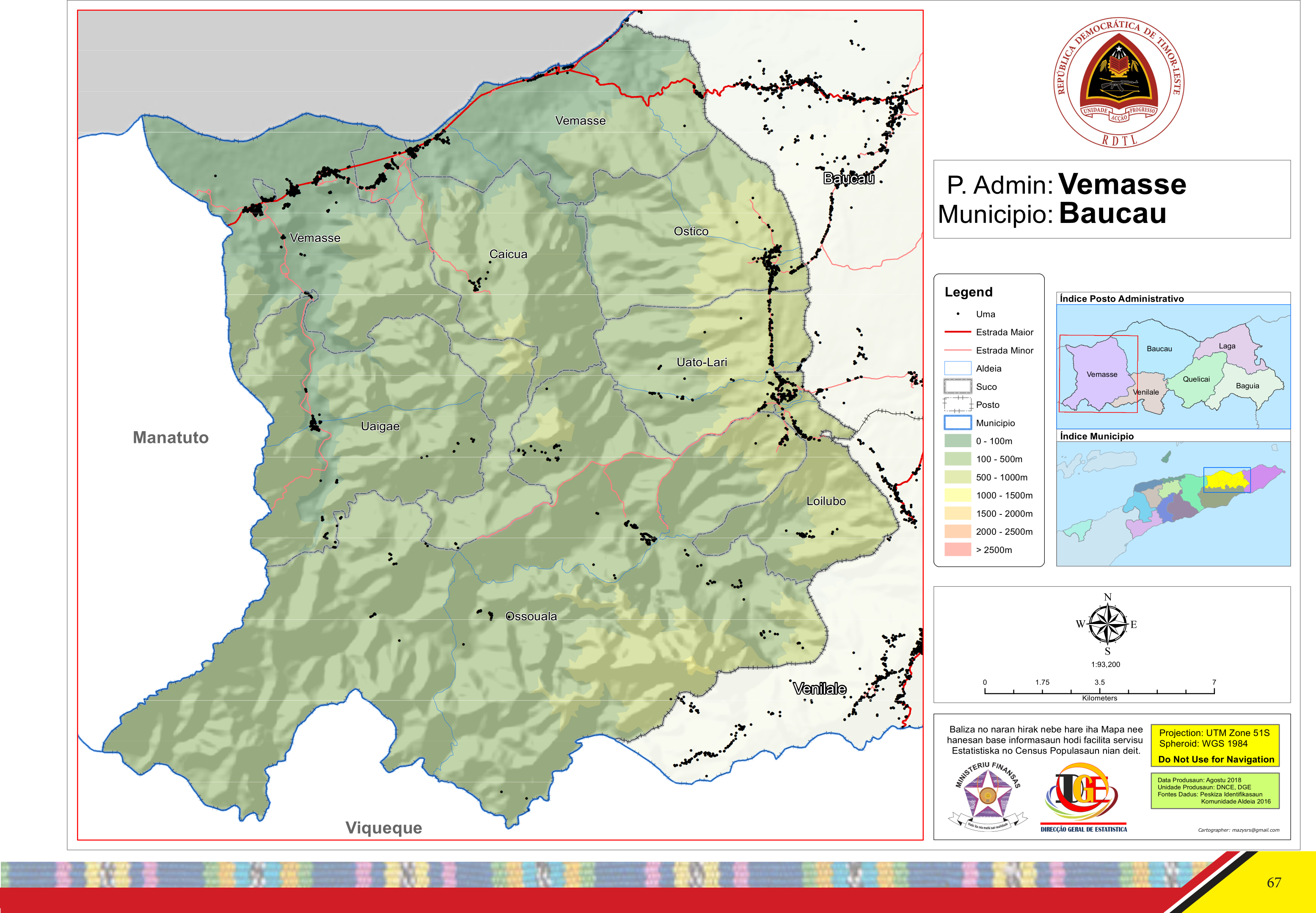
- Official map

- Location within East Timor
- Coordinates: 8°31′S 126°13′E
- Country: Timor-Leste
- Municipality: Baucau
- Seat: Vemasse
- Sucos: Caicua; Loilubo; Ossouala; Ostico; Uaigae; Uato-Lari; Vemasse

Area
  - Total: 358.5 km^{2} (138.4 sq mi)

Population (2015 census)
  - Total: 9,643
  - Density: 26.90/km^{2} (69.67/sq mi)

Households (2015 census)
  - Total: 1,817
- Time zone: UTC+09:00 (TLT)

Vemasse, officially Vemasse Administrative Post (Portuguese: Posto Administrativo de Vemasse, Tetun: Postu administrativu Vemasi), is an administrative post (and was formerly a subdistrict) in Baucau municipality, Timor-Leste. Its seat or administrative centre is Vemasse.
