= Fatumean Administrative Post =

Administrative post in Cova Lima Municipality, East Timor

Fatumean
- Administrative Post
- Posto Administrativo de Fatumean (Portuguese); Postu administrativu Fatu-Mean (Tetum)
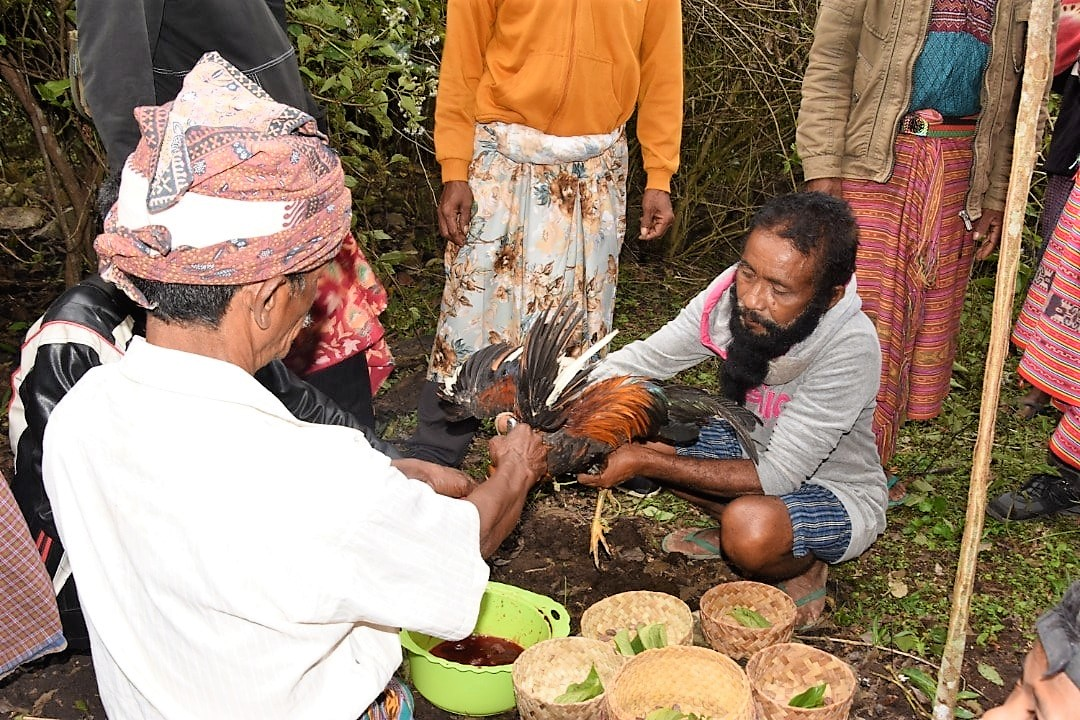
- Tara Bandu ceremony in Nanu

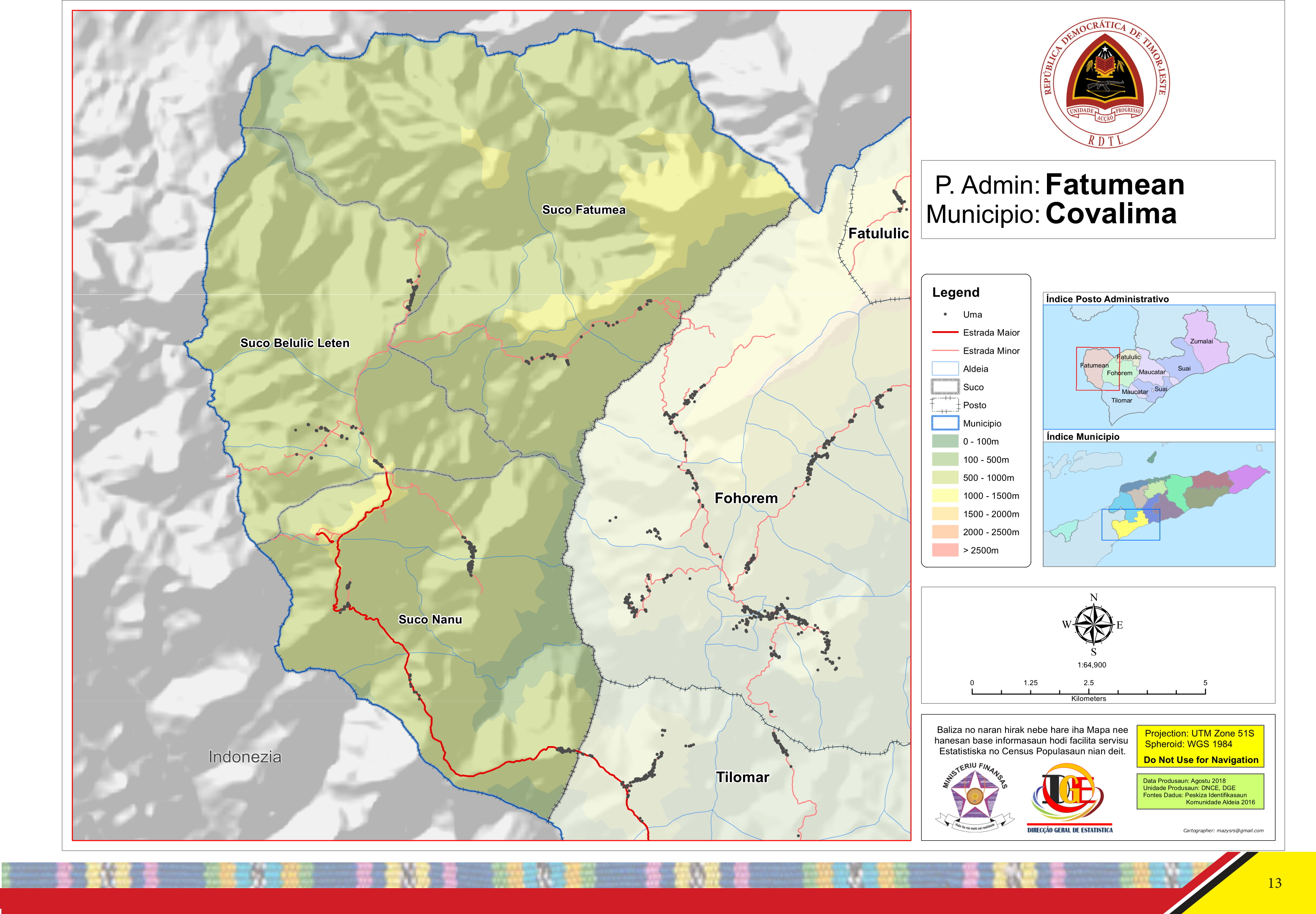
- Official map

- Location within East Timor
- Coordinates: 9°14′S 125°02′E
- Country: East Timor
- Municipality: Cova Lima
- Seat: Fatumea
- Sucos: Belulic Leten; Fatumea; Nanu

Area
  - Total: 132.1 km^{2} (51.0 sq mi)

Population (2015 census)
  - Total: 3,330
  - Density: 25.2/km^{2} (65.3/sq mi)

Households (2015 census)
  - Total: 673
- Time zone: UTC+09:00 (TLT)

Fatumean, officially Fatumean Administrative Post (Portuguese: Posto Administrativo de Fatumean, Tetum: Postu administrativu Fatu-Mean), is an administrative post in Cova Lima municipality, East Timor. Its seat or administrative centre is Fatumea. and its population at the 2004 census was 3,346.
