= Hato-Builico Administrative Post =

Administrative post in Ainaro Municipality, Timor-Leste

Hato-Builico
- Administrative Post
- Posto Administrativo de Hato-Builico (Portuguese); Postu administrativu Hatu-Builiku (Tetum)
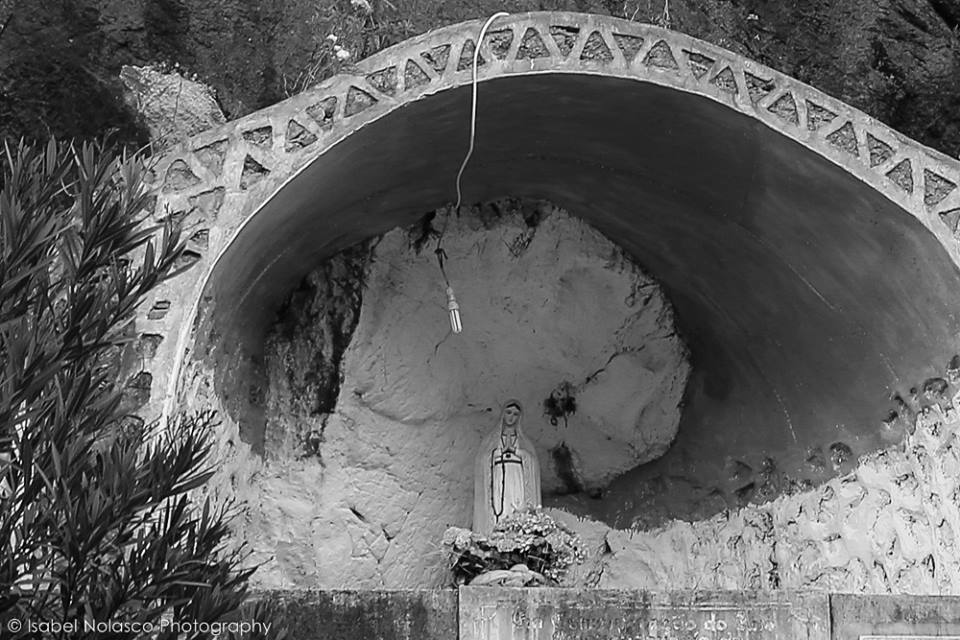
- Virgin Mary in an altar in Hatu-Builico

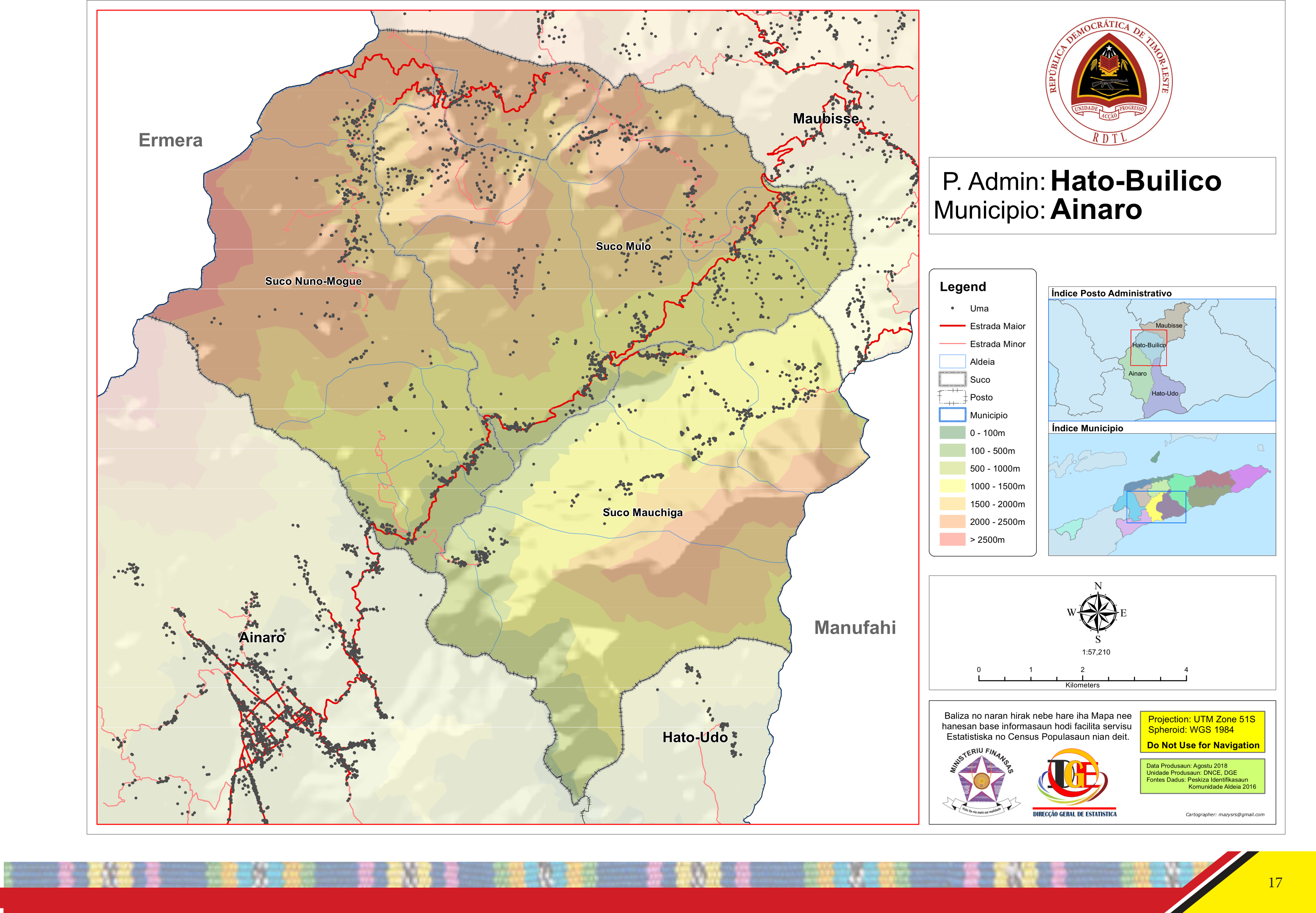
- Official map

- Location within East Timor
- Coordinates: 8°54′S 125°31′E
- Country: Timor-Leste
- Municipality: Ainaro
- Seat: Mulo
- Sucos: Mauchiga; Mulo; Nuno-Mogue

Area
  - Total: 129.3 km^{2} (49.9 sq mi)

Population (2015 census)
  - Total: 12,966
  - Density: 100.3/km^{2} (259.7/sq mi)

Households (2015 census)
  - Total: 2,169
- Time zone: UTC+09:00 (TLT)

Hato-Builico, officially Hato-Builico Administrative Post (Portuguese: Posto Administrativo de Hato-Builico, Tetum: Postu administrativu Hatu-Builiku), is an administrative post (and was formerly a subdistrict) in Ainaro municipality, Timor-Leste. Its seat or administrative centre is Mulo.
