= Oesilo Administrative Post =

Administrative post in Oecusse Municipality, Timor-Leste

Oesilo
- Administrative Post
- Posto Administrativo de Oesilo (Portuguese); Postu administrativu Oe-Silu (Tetum)
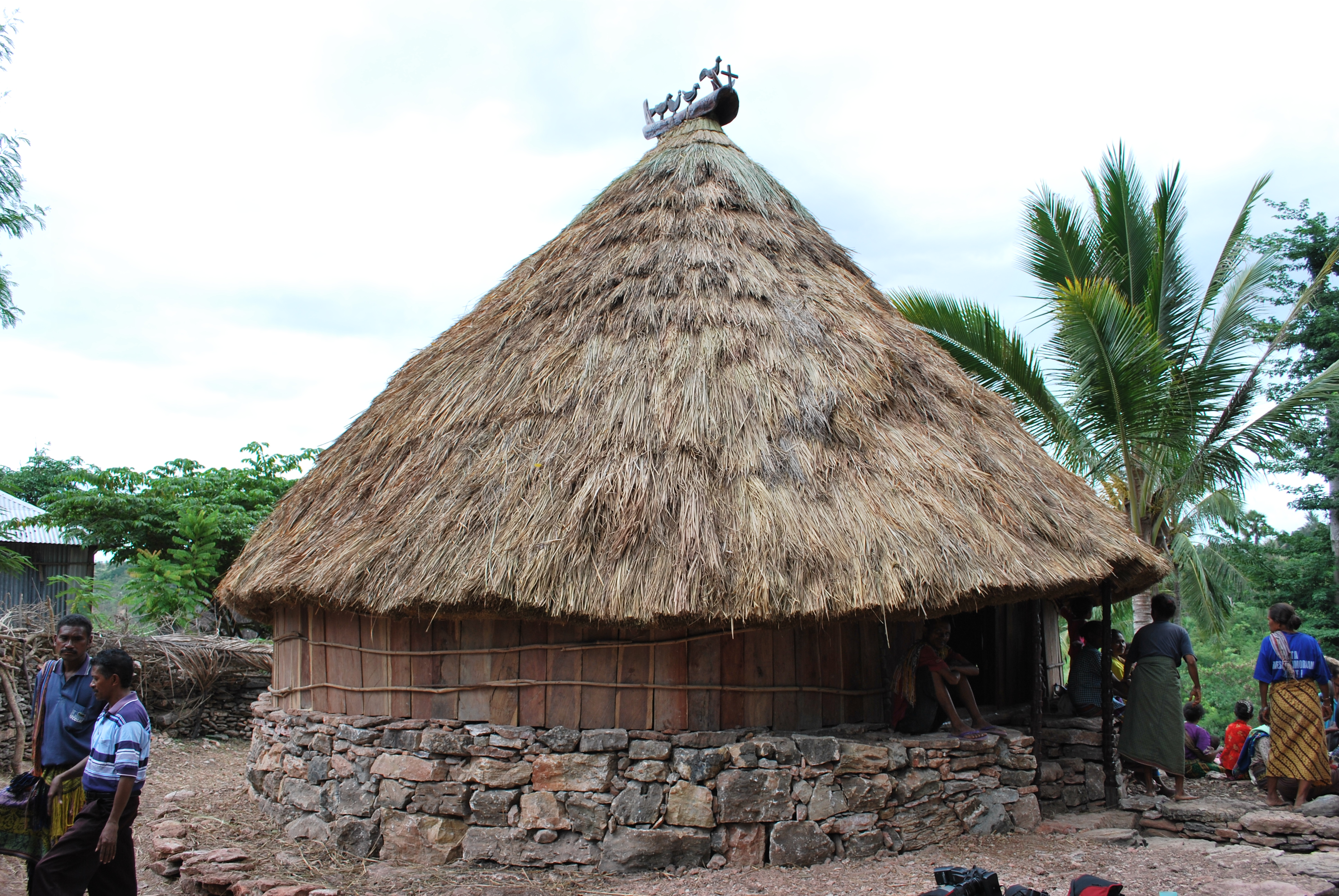
- Traditional house in Tumin, Bobometo

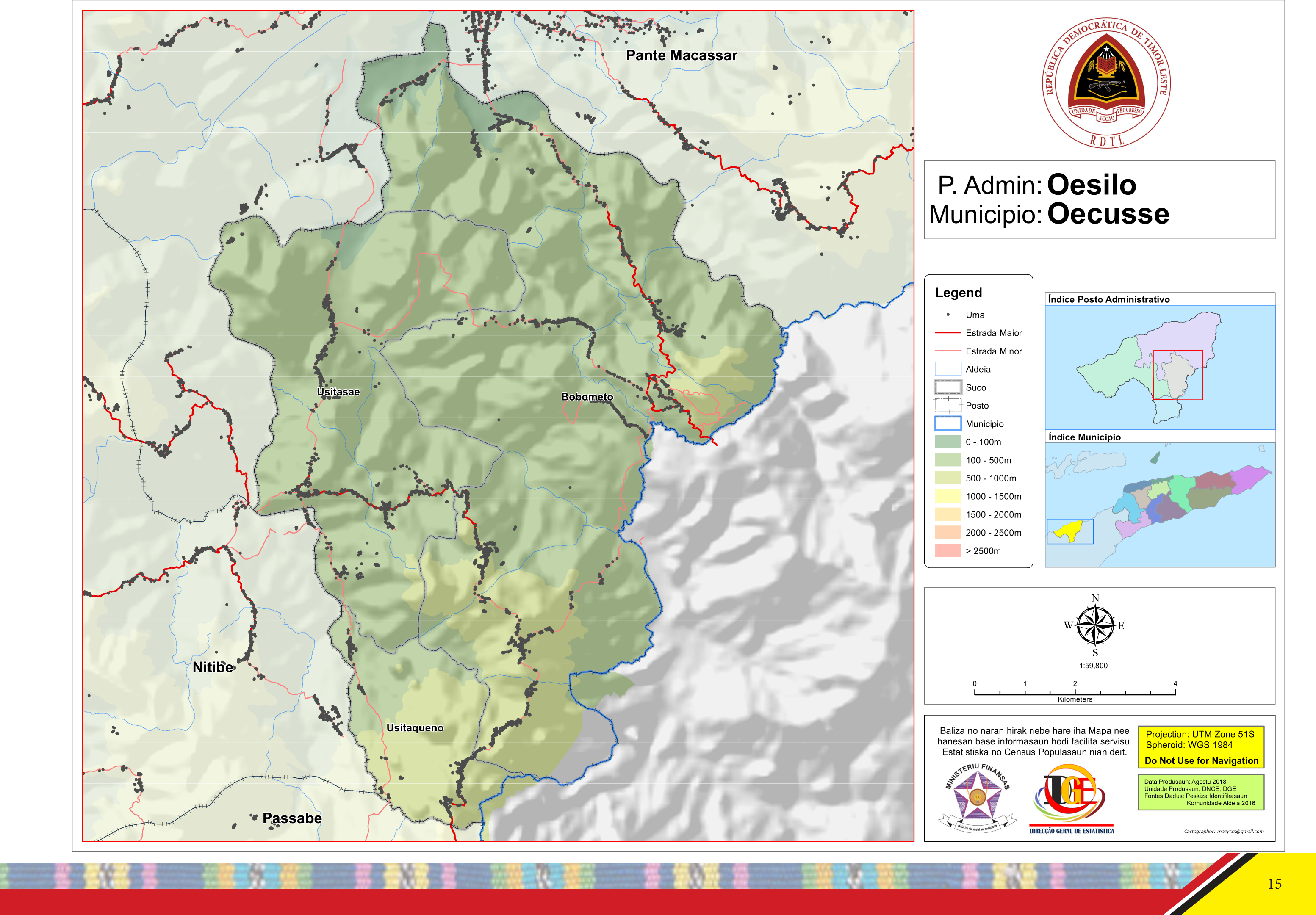
- Official map

- Location within East Timor
- Coordinates: 9°20′S 124°22′E
- Country: Timor-Leste
- Municipality: Oecusse
- Seat: Bobometo
- Sucos: Bobometo; Usitaqueno; Usitasae

Area
  - Total: 97.4 km^{2} (37.6 sq mi)

Population (2015 census)
  - Total: 11,481
  - Density: 118/km^{2} (305/sq mi)

Households (2015 census)
  - Total: 2,538
- Time zone: UTC+09:00 (TLT)

Oesilo, officially Oesilo Administrative Post (Portuguese: Posto Administrativo de Oesilo, Tetum: Postu administrativu Oe-Silu), is an administrative post (and was formerly a subdistrict) in the Oecusse municipality and Special Administrative Region (SAR) of Timor-Leste. Its seat or administrative centre is Bobometo.
