= Ermera Administrative Post =

Administrative post in Ermera Municipality, East Timor

Ermera
- Administrative Post
- Posto Administrativo de Ermera (Portuguese); Postu administrativu Ermera (Tetum)
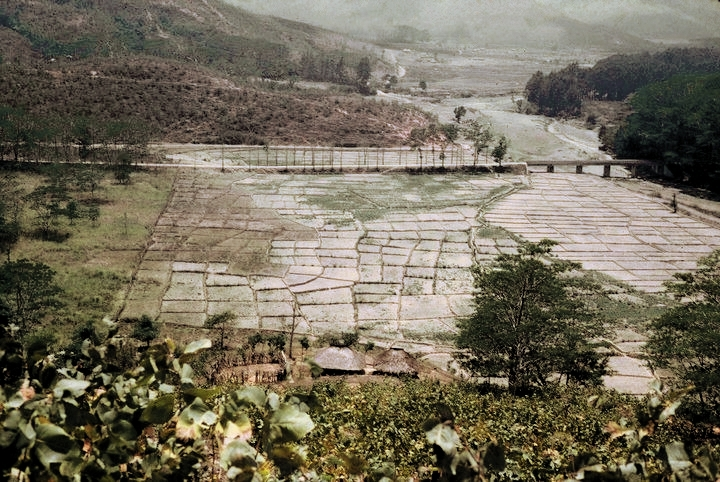
- Ermera plain and the Gleno River

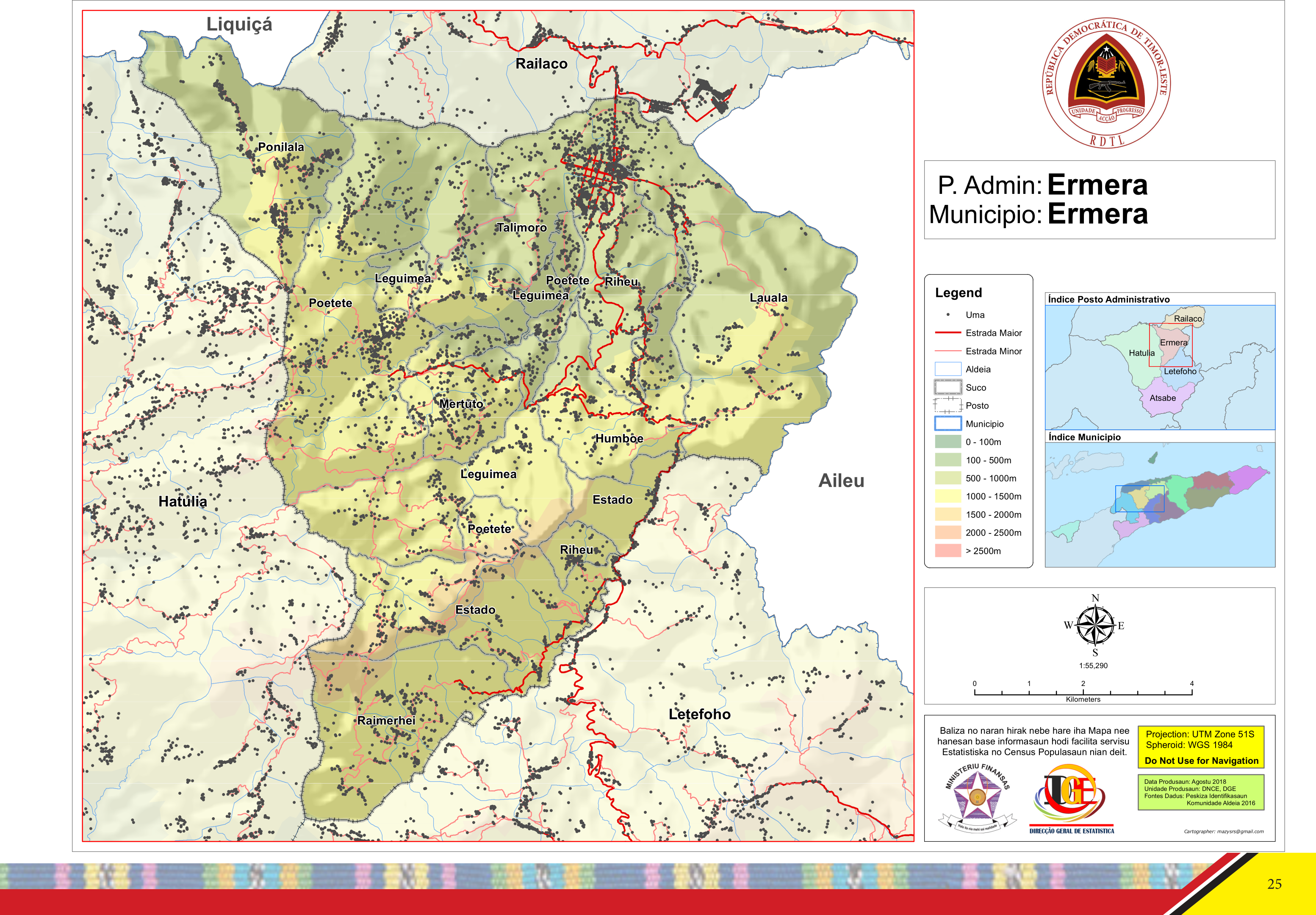
- Official map

- Location within East Timor
- Coordinates: 8°45′S 125°24′E
- Country: Timor-Leste
- Municipality: Ermera
- Seat: Riheu
- Sucos: Estado; Humboe; Lauala; Leguimea; Mertuto; Poetete; Ponilala; Raimerhei; Riheu; Talimoro

Area
  - Total: 91.5 km^{2} (35.3 sq mi)

Population (2022 census)
  - Total: 40,294
  - Density: 440/km^{2} (1,140/sq mi)

Households (2015 census)
  - Total: 5,672
- Time zone: UTC+09:00 (TLT)

Ermera, officially Ermera Administrative Post (Portuguese: Posto Administrativo de Ermera, Tetum: Postu administrativu Ermera), is an administrative post in Ermera municipality, Timor-Leste. Its seat or administrative centre is Gleno (Suco Riheu).
