= Ermera Municipality =

Municipality of East Timor

Ermera
- Municipality of Timor-Leste
- Município Ermera (Portuguese); Munisípiu Ermera (Tetum)
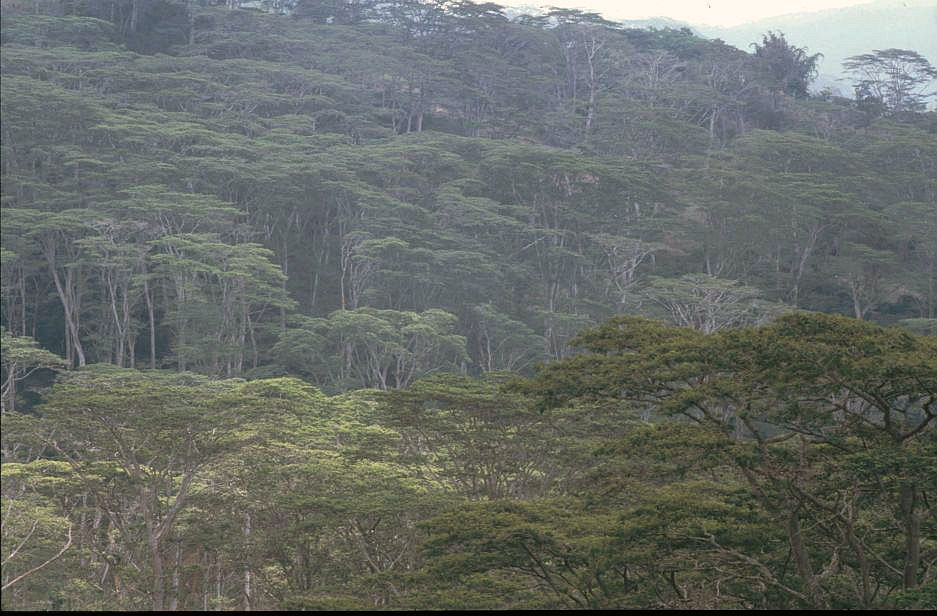
- Ermera

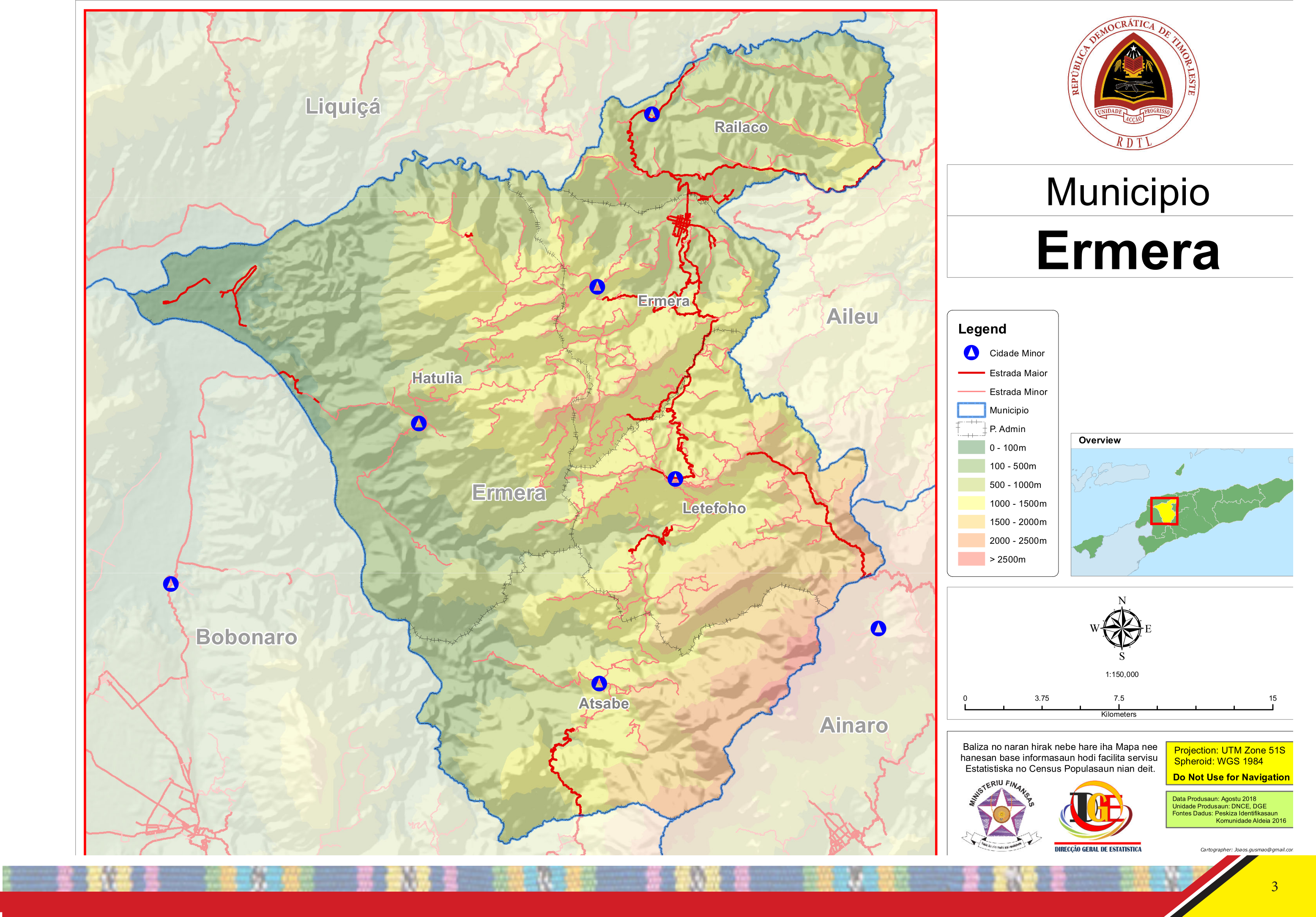
- Official map

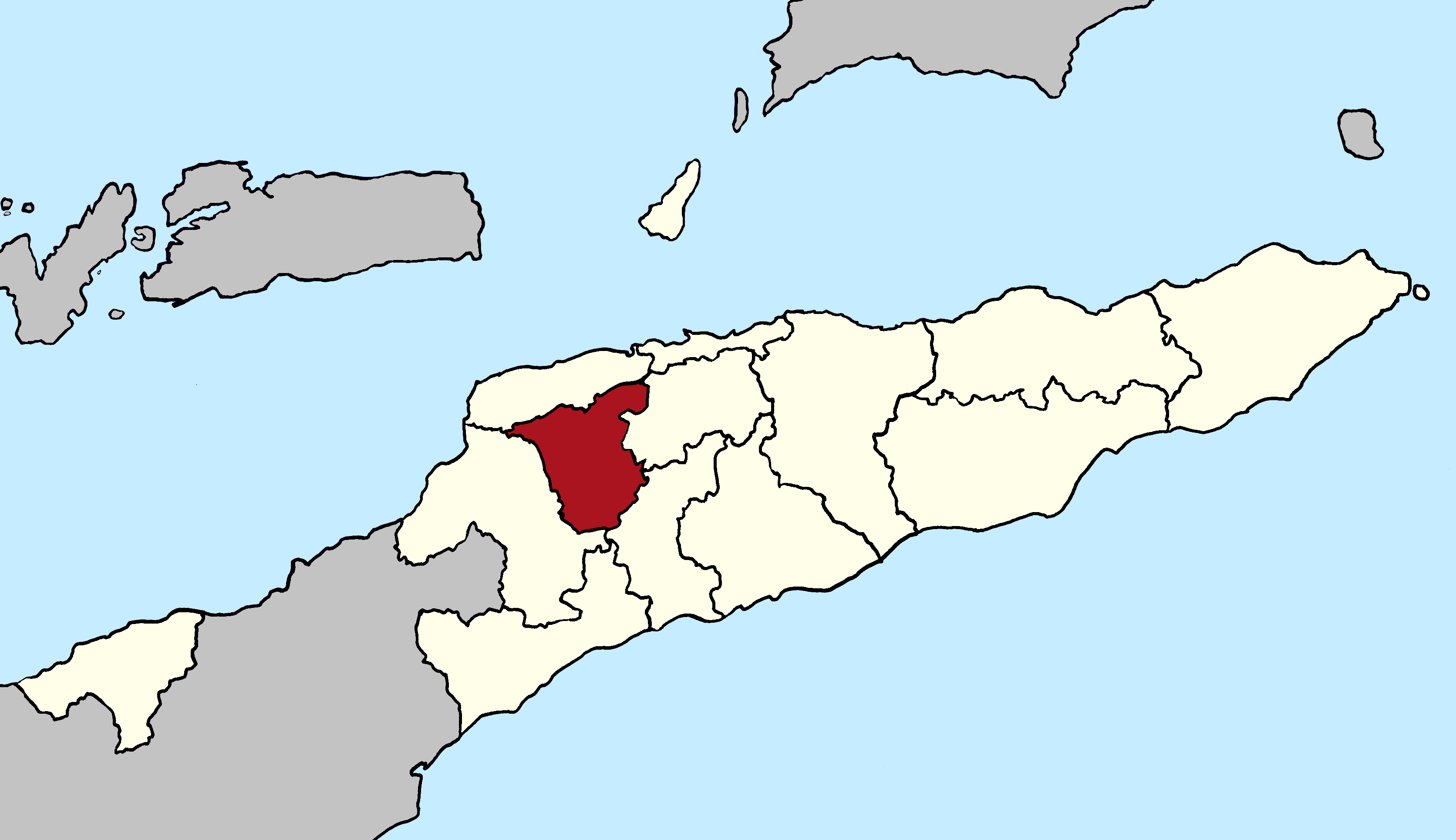
- Ermera in Timor-Leste
- Interactive map of Ermera
- Coordinates: 8°50′S 125°23′E
- Country: Timor-Leste
- Capital: Gleno
- Administrative posts: Atsabe; Ermera; Hatulia; Hatulia B; Letefoho; Railaco

Area
  - Total: 756.5 km^{2} (292.1 sq mi)
  - Rank: 10th

Population (2015 census)
  - Total: 125,702
  - Rank: 2nd
  - Density: 166.2/km^{2} (430.4/sq mi)
  - Rank: 2nd

Households (2015 census)
  - Total: 20,671
  - Rank: 3rd
- Time zone: UTC+09:00 (TLT)
- ISO 3166 code: TL-ER
- HDI (2017): 0.562 medium · 11th
- Website: Ermera Municipality

Ermera (Portuguese: Município Ermera, Tetum: Munisípiu Ermera) is one of the municipalities (formerly districts) of Timor-Leste, located in the west-central part of the country. It has a population of 117,064 (Census 2010) and an area of 756.5 km^{2}.

== Toponymy ==
The word Ermera means 'red water' in the local Mambai language. It is said that the ancestors of the municipality's present inhabitants originated from three mountains, namely Cailitlau, Lalimlau, and Hituria, and that the name Ermera refers to the red waters flowing from those mountains.

== Geography ==
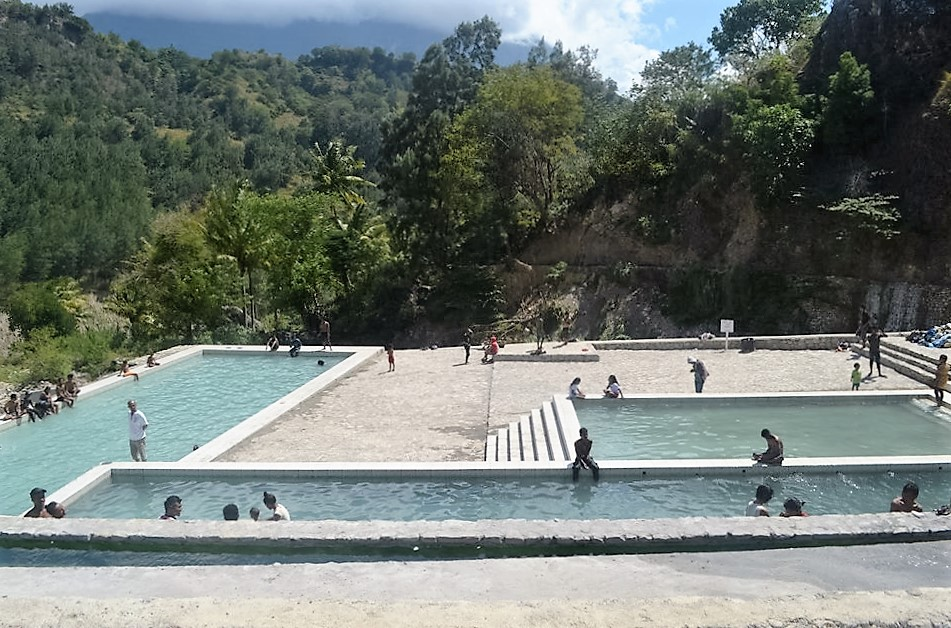
Hot springs of Marobo

Ermera is one of only two land-locked municipalities in Timor-Leste, the other being Aileu. It borders Liquiçá to the north, Dili to the northeast, Alieu to the east, Ainaro to the southeast, and Bobonaro to the west.

The boundaries of the municipality are identical to those of the district of the same name in Portuguese Timor. Its capital is Gleno, which is located 30 km to the southwest of the national capital, Dili. The city of Ermera, also known as Vila Ermera, lies 58 km from the capital along the same road. In Marobo (Atsabe Administrative Post) are the remains of a hot springs bath from colonial times. The pool is still in use.

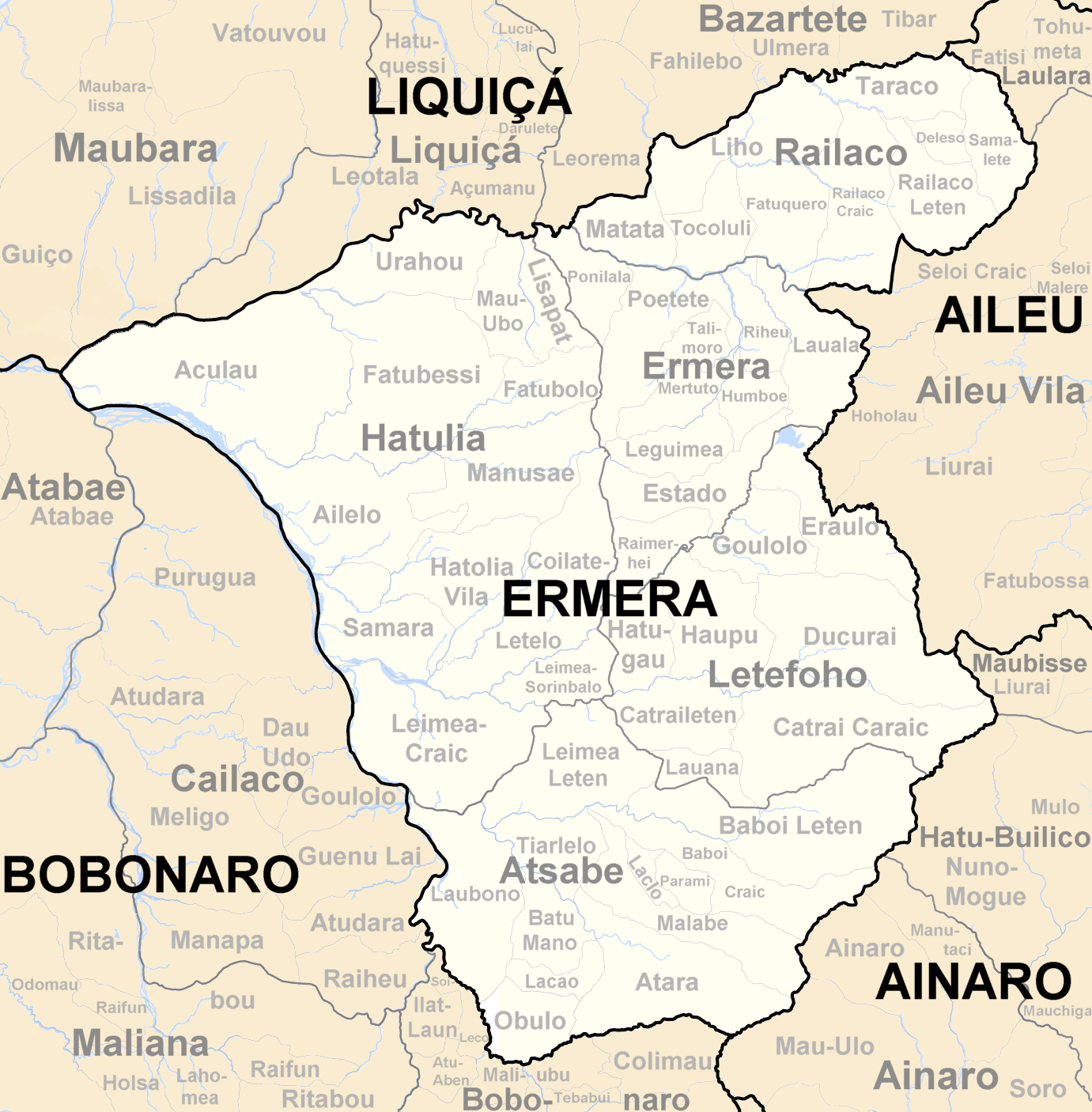
Subdivisions of Ermera (borders between 2003 and 2015)

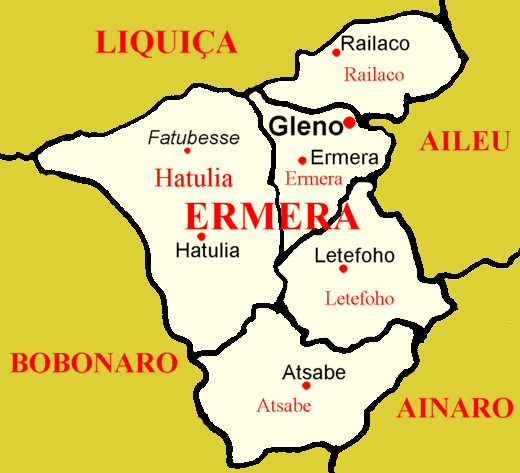
Cities of Ermera

== Administrative posts ==
The municipality's administrative posts (formerly sub-districts) are:

- Atsabe Administrative Post
- Ermera Administrative Post
- Hatulia Administrative Post
- Hatulia B Administrative Post
- Letefoho Administrative Post
- Railaco Administrative Post

The administrative posts are divided into 52 sucos ("villages") in total.
