= Hatulia Administrative Post =

Administrative post in Ermera Municipality, Timor-Leste

Hatulia
- Administrative Post
- Posto Administrativo de Hatulia (Portuguese); Postu administrativu Hatólia (Tetum)
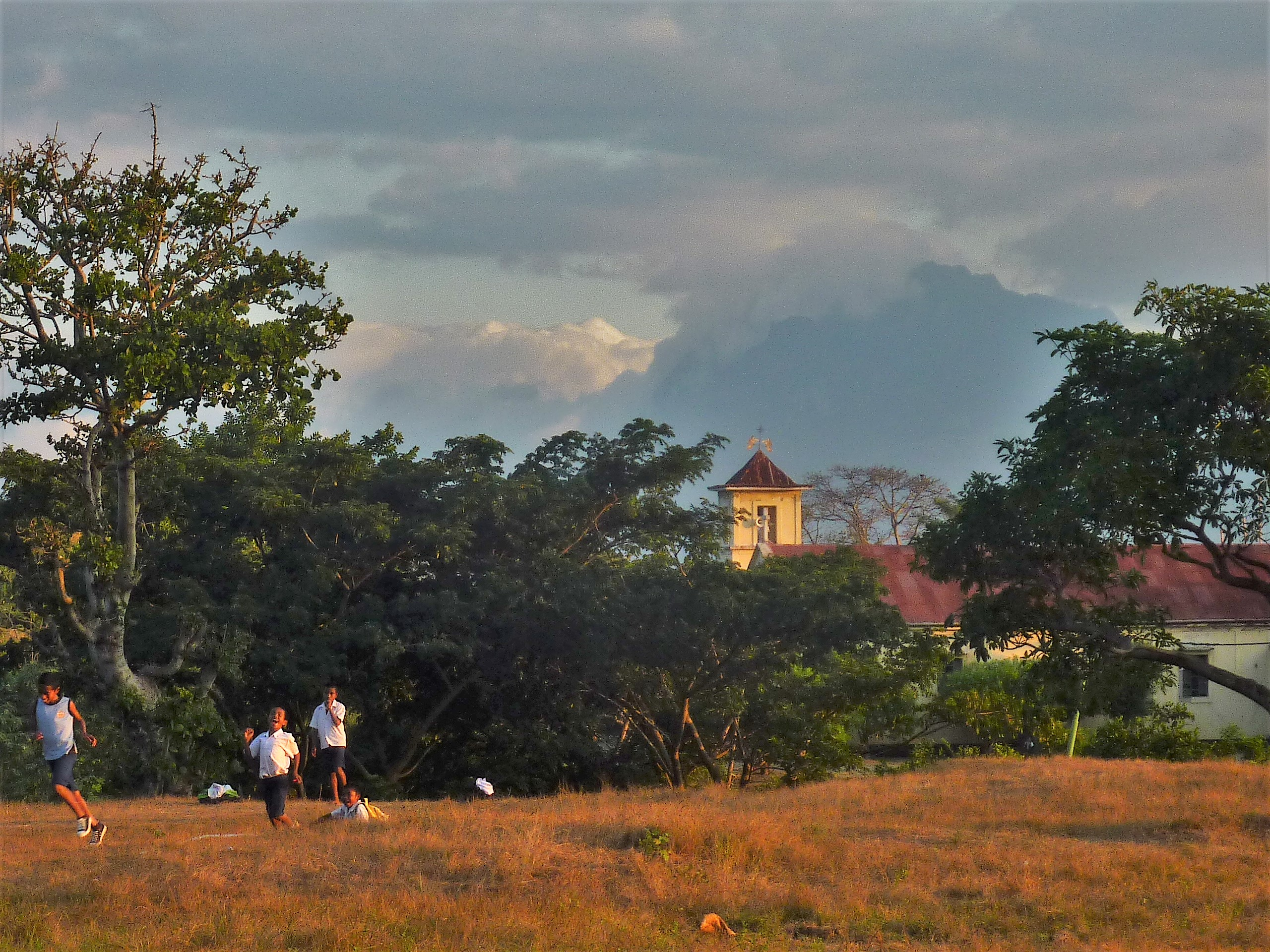
- Hatolia Vila

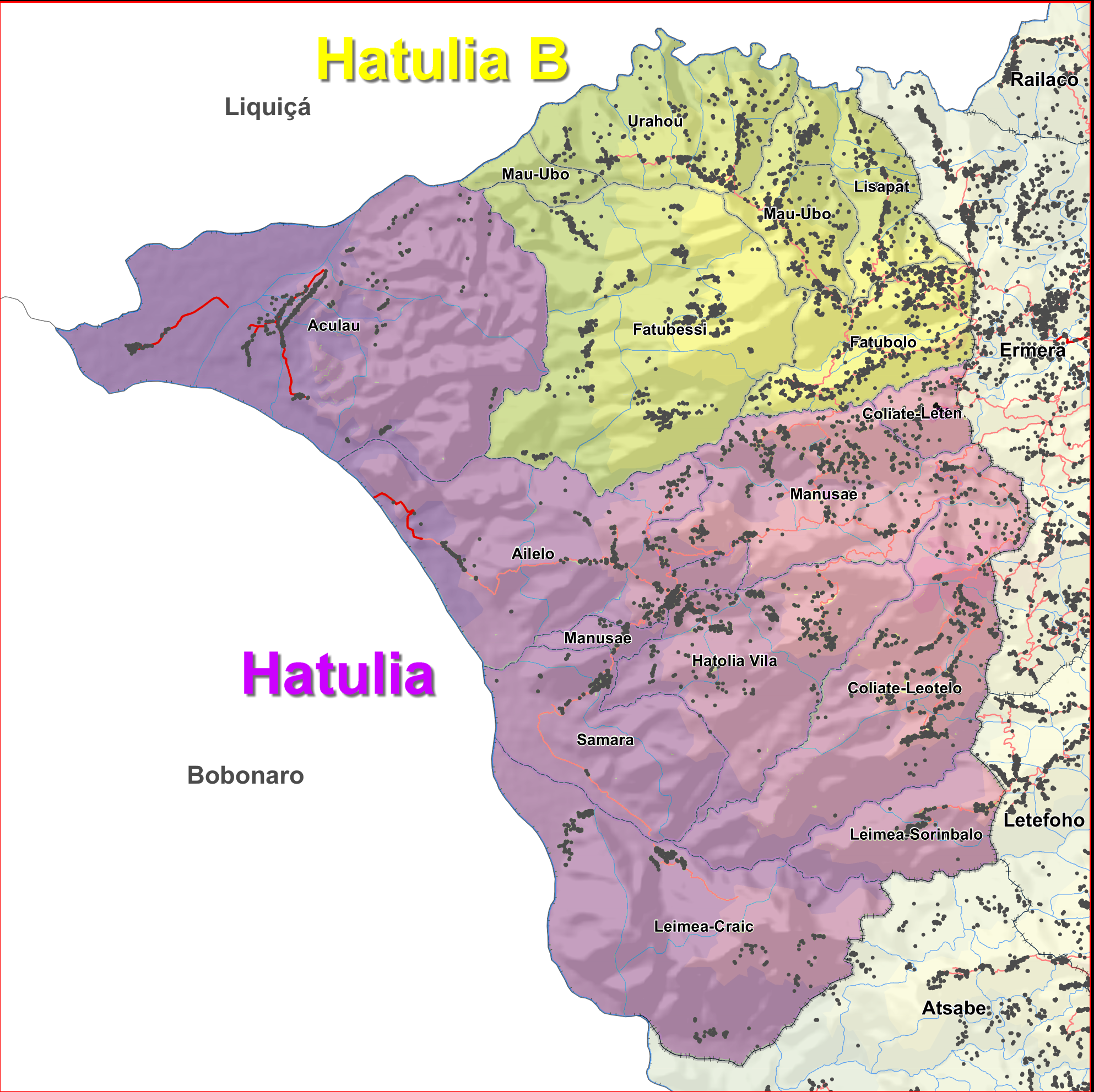
- Map of Hatulia and Hatulia B

- Location within East Timor
- Coordinates: 8°49′S 125°19′E
- Country: Timor-Leste
- Municipality: Ermera
- Seat: Hatolia Vila
- Sucos: Aculau; Ailelo; Coilate-Letelo; Hatolia Vila; Leimea-Craic; Leimea-Sarinbalo; Manusae; Samara

Area
  - Total: 196.03 km^{2} (75.69 sq mi)

Population (2015 census)
  - Total: 36,778
  - Density: 187.61/km^{2} (485.92/sq mi)
- Time zone: UTC+09:00 (TLT)

Hatulia, officially Hatulia Administrative Post (Portuguese: Posto Administrativo de Hatulia, Tetum: Postu administrativu Hatólia), is an administrative post in Ermera municipality, Timor-Leste. Its seat or administrative centre is Hatolia Vila, and its population was 30,659 in the 2004 census.
