= Administrative posts of Timor-Leste =

Second-level administrative divisions of Timor-Leste

The municipalities of Timor-Leste are divided into 70 administrative posts (previously subdistricts until 2014) since 2024. On 1 January 2024, three new administrative posts were created, one in Liquiçá Municipality (Loes) and two in Baucau Municipality (Quelicai Antiga and Matebian)

Each administrative post is divided into several sucos. Sucos are divided into several aldeias, the smallest political division of Timor-Leste.

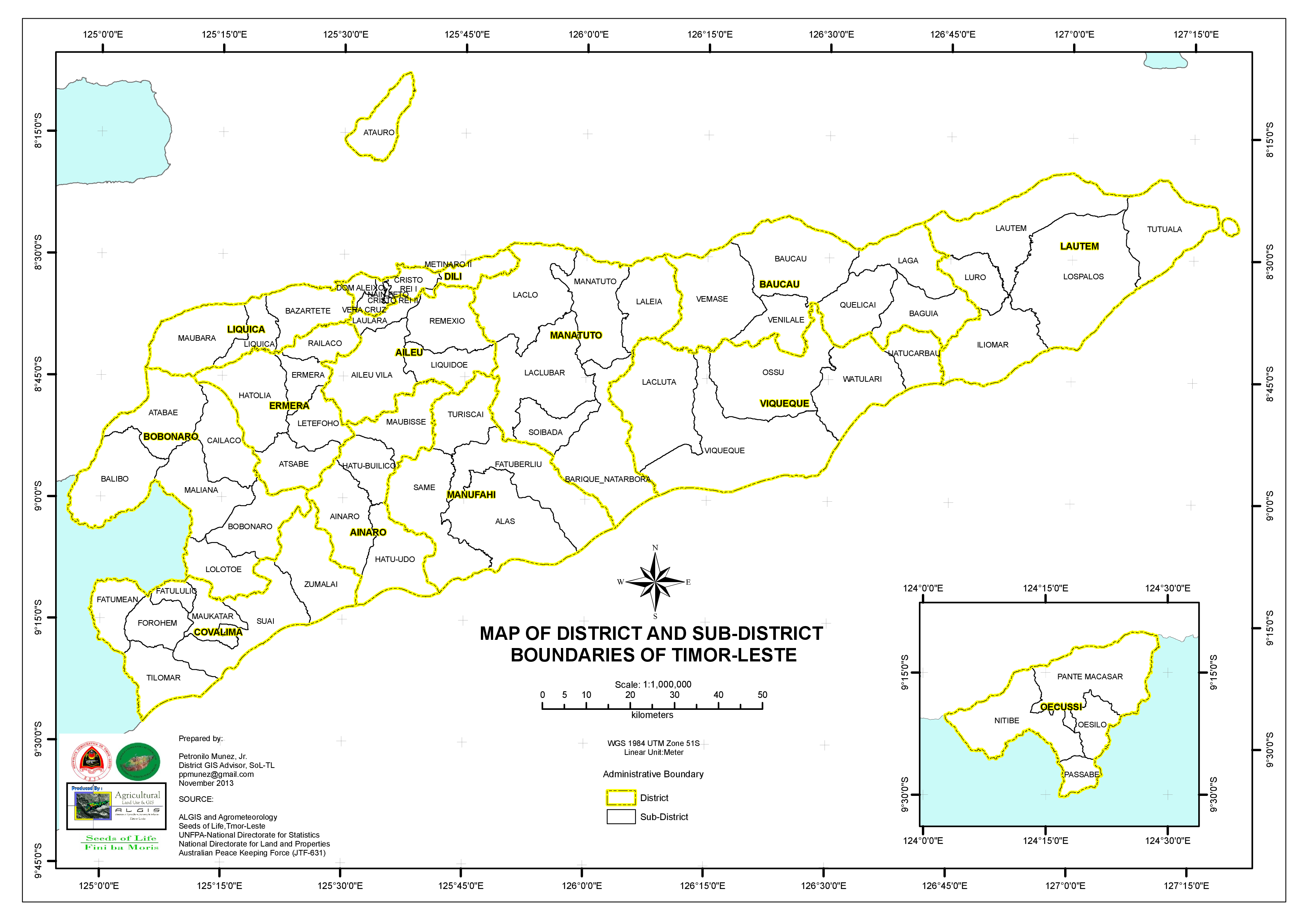
Administrative posts of Timor-Leste in the borders until 2015

== List ==
Municipality	Administrative post
Aileu	Aileu Administrative Post (place of capital)
Aileu	Laulara Administrative Post
Aileu	Lequidoe Administrative Post
Aileu	Remexio Administrative Post
Ainaro	Ainaro Administrative Post (place of capital)
Ainaro	Hato-Udo Administrative Post
Ainaro	Hato-Builico Administrative Post
Ainaro	Maubisse Administrative Post
Atauro	
Baucau	Baguia Administrative Post
Baucau	Baucau Administrative Post (place of capital)
Baucau	Laga Administrative Post
Baucau	Matebian Administrative Post
Baucau	Quelicai Administrative Post
Baucau	Quelicai Antiga Administrative Post
Baucau	Vemasse Administrative Post
Baucau	Venilale Administrative Post
Bobonaro	Atabae Administrative Post
Bobonaro	Balibó Administrative Post
Bobonaro	Bobonaro Administrative Post
Bobonaro	Cailaco Administrative Post
Bobonaro	Lolotoe Administrative Post
Bobonaro	Maliana Administrative Post (place of capital)
Cova Lima	Fatululic Administrative Post
Cova Lima	Fatumean Administrative Post
Cova Lima	Fohorem Administrative Post
Cova Lima	Maucatar Administrative Post
Cova Lima	Suai Administrative Post (place of capital)
Cova Lima	Tilomar Administrative Post
Cova Lima	Zumalai Administrative Post
Dili	Cristo Rei Administrative Post
Dili	Dom Aleixo Administrative Post
Dili	Metinaro Administrative Post
Dili	Nain Feto Administrative Post
Dili	Vera Cruz Administrative Post
Ermera	Atsabe Administrative Post
Ermera	Ermera Administrative Post (place of capital)
Ermera	Hatólia Administrative Post
Ermera	Letefoho Administrative Post
Ermera	Railaco Administrative Post
Lautém	Iliomar Administrative Post
Lautém	Lautém Administrative Post
Lautém	Lospalos Administrative Post (place of capital)
Lautém	Luro Administrative Post
Lautém	Tutuala Administrative Post
Liquiçá	Bazartete Administrative Post (place of capital)
Liquiçá	Liquiçá Administrative Post
Liquiçá	Loes Administrative Post
Liquiçá	Maubara Administrative Post
Manatuto	Barique Administrative Post
Manatuto	Laclo Administrative Post
Manatuto	Laclubar Administrative Post
Manatuto	Laleia Administrative Post
Manatuto	Manatuto Administrative Post (place of capital)
Manatuto	Soibada Administrative Post
Manufahi	Alas Administrative Post
Manufahi	Fatuberlio Administrative Post
Manufahi	Same Administrative Post (place of capital)
Manufahi	Turiscai Administrative Post
Oecusse	Nitibe Administrative Post
Oecusse	Oesilo Administrative Post
Oecusse	Pante Macassar Administrative Post (place of capital)
Oecusse	Passabe Administrative Post
Viqueque	Lacluta Administrative Post
Viqueque	Ossu Administrative Post
Viqueque	Uato-Lari Administrative Post
Viqueque	Uatucarbau Administrative Post
Viqueque	Viqueque Administrative Post (place of capital)

== See also ==
- Municipalities of Timor-Leste
- Sucos of Timor-Leste
