= Municipalities of Timor-Leste =

Timor-Leste is divided into 14 municipalities (Portuguese: municípios, Tetum: munisípiu), which are former districts. One municipality is also a Special Administrative Region (SAR). The municipalities are divided into administrative posts (former subdistricts), and further subdivided into sucos (villages). Atauro Island was initially a part of Dili Municipality, but became a separate municipality on 1 January 2022. The borders between Cova Lima and Ainaro and between Baucau and Viqueque were changed in 2003.

The municipalities in Timor-Leste are largely inherited from the earlier regencies (kabupaten) of the Indonesian province, all of which were created on 30 July 1976 by Government Regulation Number 19, when the New Order remained in place.

== List ==
Municipality	Capital	Established	Area	Population (2022)	Population density	Map
Aileu	Aileu	1973	676 km^{2} (261 sq mi)	54,631	80.8/km^{2} (209/sq mi)	
Ainaro	Ainaro	1970	869.8 km^{2} (335.8 sq mi)	72,989	83.9/km^{2} (217/sq mi)	
Atauro	Vila Maumeta	2022	140.5 km^{2} (54.2 sq mi)	10,302	73.3/km^{2} (190/sq mi)	
Baucau	Baucau	1960	1,508 km^{2} (582 sq mi)	133,881	88.8/km^{2} (230/sq mi)	
Bobonaro	Maliana	1960	1,380.8 km^{2} (533.1 sq mi)	106,543	77.2/km^{2} (200/sq mi)	
Cova Lima	Suai	1961	1,206.7 km^{2} (465.9 sq mi)	73,909	61.3/km^{2} (159/sq mi)	
Dili	Dili	1941	227.6 km^{2} (87.9 sq mi)	324,269	1,424.7/km^{2} (3,690/sq mi)	
Ermera	Gleno	1960	770.8 km^{2} (297.6 sq mi)	138,080	179.1/km^{2} (464/sq mi)	
Lautém	Lospalos	1960	1,813.1 km^{2} (700.0 sq mi)	69,836	38.5/km^{2} (100/sq mi)	
Liquiçá	Liquiçá	1970	551 km^{2} (213 sq mi)	83,689	151.9/km^{2} (393/sq mi)	
Manatuto	Manatuto	1960	1,786 km^{2} (690 sq mi)	50,989	28.6/km^{2} (74/sq mi)	
Manufahi	Same	1960	1,326.6 km^{2} (512.2 sq mi)	60,536	45.6/km^{2} (118/sq mi)	
Oecusse	Pante Macassar	1973	817.2 km^{2} (315.5 sq mi)	80,726	98.8/km^{2} (256/sq mi)	
Viqueque	Viqueque	1960	1,880.4 km^{2} (726.0 sq mi)	80,054	42.6/km^{2} (110/sq mi)	

A clickable map of East Timor exhibiting its 14 administrative municipalities.

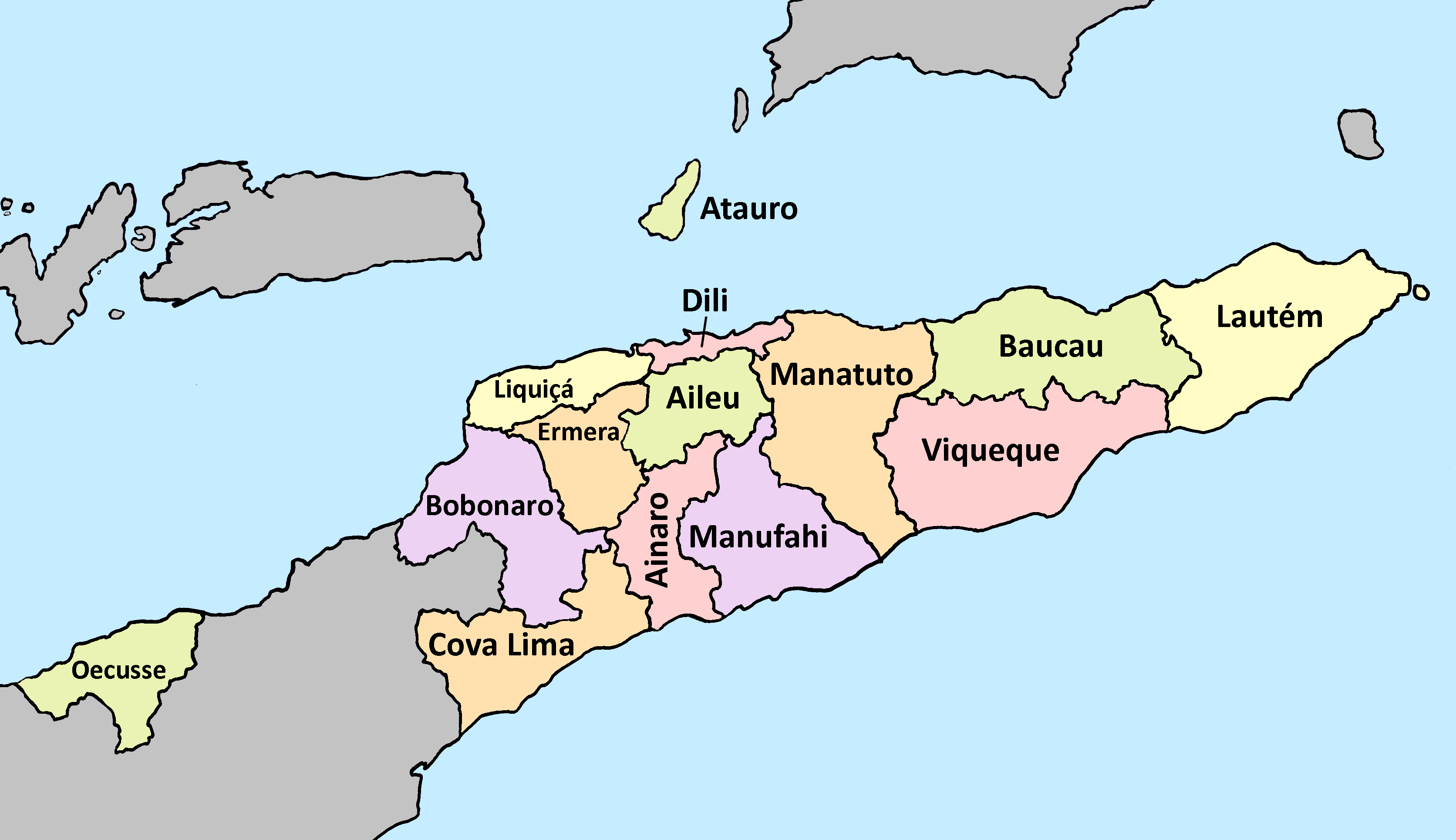
A clickable map of East Timor exhibiting its 14 administrative municipalities.

== By population ==
Municipality	2004 census	2010 census	2015 census	2022 census
Lautém	56,293	59,787	65,240	70,022
Baucau	100,748	111,694	123,203	134,878
Viqueque	65,449	70,036	76,033	80,176
Manatuto	36,897	42,742	46,619	50,859
Dili	165,678	225,424	268,005	324,738
Aileu	37,967	44,325	48,837	54,324
Manufahi	45,081	48,628	53,691	60,665
Liquiçá	54,973	63,403	79,127	83,658
Ermera	103,322	117,064	125,702	137,750
Ainaro	52,480	59,175	63,136	73,115
Bobonaro	83,579	92,049	97,762	106,639
Cova Lima	53,063	59,455	65,301	73,933
Oecusse	57,616	64,025	68,913	60,685
Atauro	7,863	8,602	9,274	10,295

Source: National Institute of Statistics Timor-Leste.

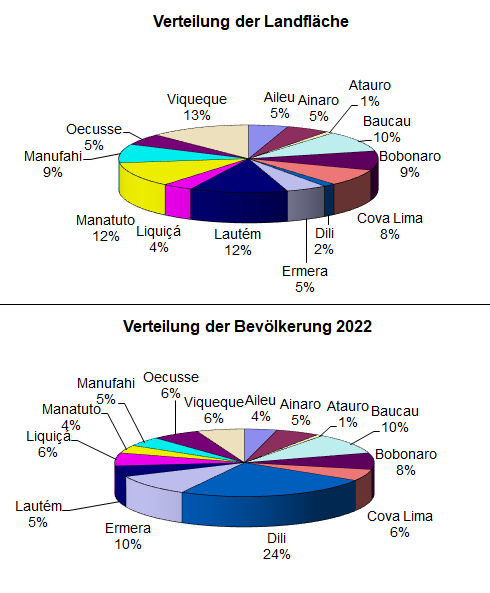
Allocation of land area and population in percent (2010)

== See also ==
- List of municipalities of Timor-Leste by Human Development Index
- Administrative divisions of Timor Timur Province
- Administrative posts of Timor-Leste
- Sucos of Timor-Leste
- ISO 3166-2:TL
