= Tatamailau =

Mountain in Timor-Leste

- Ramelau
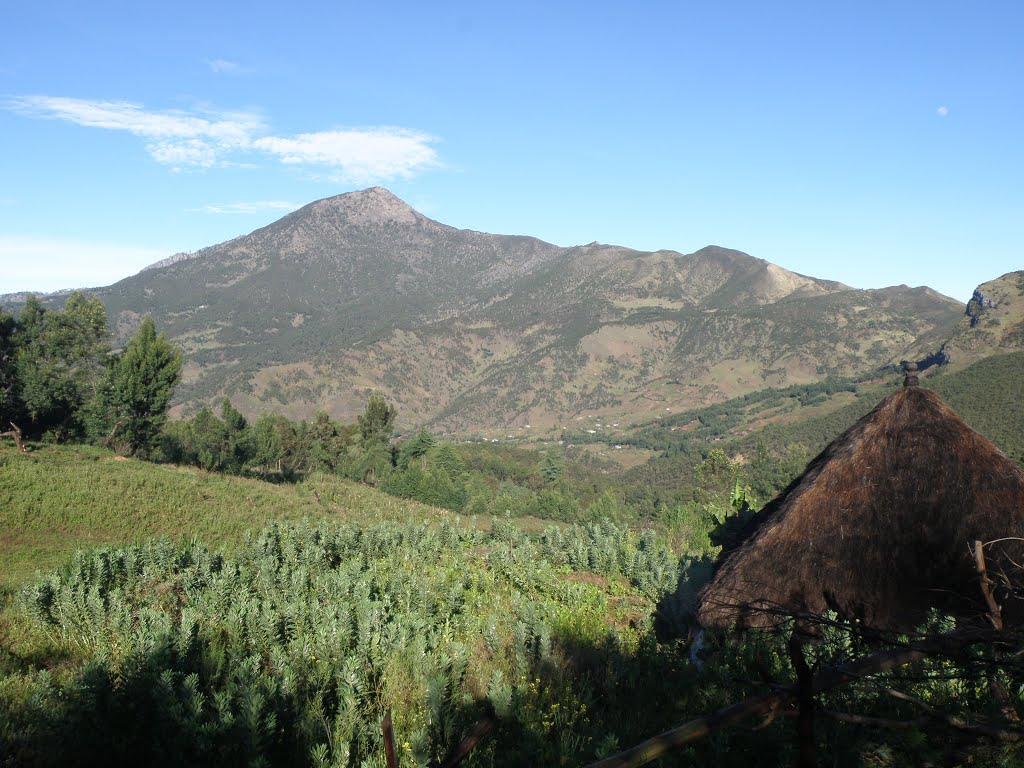

Highest point
- Elevation: 2,963 m (9,721 ft)
- Prominence: 2,963 m (9,721 ft); Ranked 98th
- Listing: Country high point Ultra; Ribu
- Coordinates: 8°54′24″S 125°29′36″E

Geography
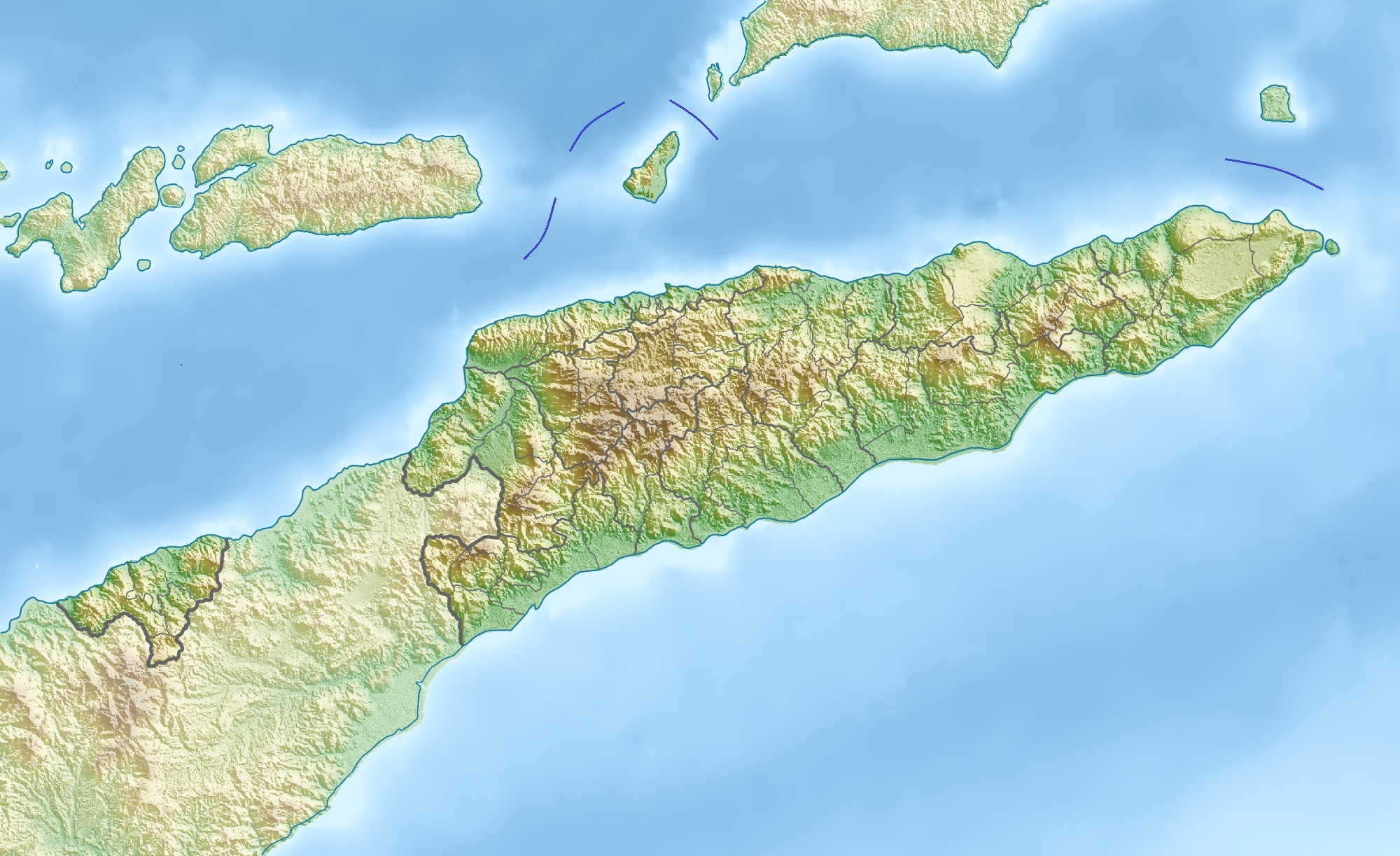
- Location within East Timor
- Location: Ainaro District, Timor-Leste

Climbing
- Easiest route: Hike

Tatamailau (Tetum: Foho Tatamailau), or Tata Mailau, also Mount Ramelau, is the highest point in Timor-Leste and also of Timor island at 2,963 m (9,721 ft). The mountain is located approximately 70 km (43 mi) south of the capital Dili in the district of Ainaro. While East Timor was a Portuguese colony, it was considered the highest mountain of Portugal in the twentieth century, since the highest mountain of Portugal proper is of a more modest height.

The name "Tatamailau" is of Mambai origin, and means "Grandfather of All". "Ramelau" meanwhile is the name of the massif of the mountain. Tatamailau is dedicated to the Virgin Mary and is the focus of an annual pilgrimage on the Feast of the Annunciation, held on or around 25 March. A three-metre-high statue of the Virgin Mary stands atop the summit platform; it was made in Italy and installed in 1997 during the Indonesian occupation.

== Environment ==
In the early 1980s, the mountain was extensively covered with old-growth montane forest, and was identified by BirdLife International as an Important Bird Area as it supported several endemic and restricted-range bird species. Since then, there has been considerable environmental modification with very little remaining natural tree cover. Deforestation for grazing has left only a few patches of original forest, mainly near mountain crests. The lower slopes are mainly grass covered, with the upper slopes characterised by eucalypt regrowth.

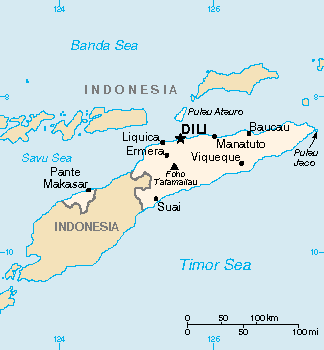
Location with reference to settlements

== Access ==
Tatamailau can be climbed from the town of Hato Bulico lying 3 km (1.9 mi) to the northeast, or from the village of Aimeta 6 km (3.7 mi) to the north; there is about 910 m (2,990 ft) of climbing from either point. The track from Hato Bulico is very well formed, having originally been cut as a pilgrimage trail to the Marian shrine on the summit, and was once accessible by four-wheel drive vehicle. A map is not required on the track, which is now very severely degraded following massive washouts requiring major detours to negotiate. As the track was cut for vehicular access the constant gradient is monotonous, the poor engineering has caused major environmental damage and the route affords few views of note. The second route from Aimeta uses a network of goatherders' tracks and does not appear on maps, thus requiring a local guide. The Aimeta track is varied, traverses unspoilt country, is extremely interesting with many mountain views and presents a more enjoyable climb.

A fit person can reach the summit in four hours from Hato Bulico, six hours from Aimeta, while expect a travel time of nine hours between Aimeta and Hato Bulico. There are no potable water sources along the route, nor human habitations beyond Hato Bulico or Aimeta. It is possible to camp on the saddle below the summit in the dry season, and experience sunset and sunrise from the same location. The summit can also freeze in the dry season, while in the wet season it can be sufficiently cold, wet and windy, posing a risk of hypothermia.

Hato Bulico is a 1.5-2 hour drive from Maubisse on a sealed road, but requires a four-wheel drive. In the wet season, it can be dangerous and periodically impassable but never for long. There is an excellent resting place at Hato Bulico close to the start of the trail. Aimeta can be reached from Letefoho in Ermera in about 1.5 hours. Shelter, but not food, may be negotiated at Aimeta with local assistance, but it is advisable to arrive entirely self-sufficient. The nearest accommodation is at Saint Bakhita, Eraulo, via Vila Ermera and it is an easy 4-hour walk to Aimeta. Horses for baggage can be hired at Aimeta, and this is useful if camping on the summit or to assist stragglers. The Aimeta trail can be a logistical challenge, which is why almost all summit bids are launched from Hato Bulico. It is possible, with care, for supporting transport to drive from Aimeta directly to Hato Bulico if the road is navigable otherwise, in the wet season, via Gleno and Aileu in about five hours. An ideal route to the summit is from Aimeta to Hato Bulico, taking in both sides of the mountain; local assistance is essential for those who cannot fluently speak Tetum and lack local knowledge.

== Geology ==
The Ramelau Mountain Range is the result of orogenic forces due to the collision of Australian and Eurasian tectonic plates. The tallest mountain in the Ramelau Mountain Range is made of mafic volcanic deposits related to intra-cratonic rifting, called the Maubisse Formation, deposited in the Permian. This is one of the oldest formations on the island of Timor, and was deposited the furthest away from the present Australian coast. Though the Maubisse Formation was one of the first units to collide with the Asian Banda volcanic arc, the Maubisse Formation thrust sheet became a roof thrust, resulting in younger sediments arriving to the collision zone in later times to stack up underneath the Maubisse sheet, a process called duplex thrusting. This led to the Maubisse Formation being the highest topographic formation on the island, and only being north of the Ramelau Range.

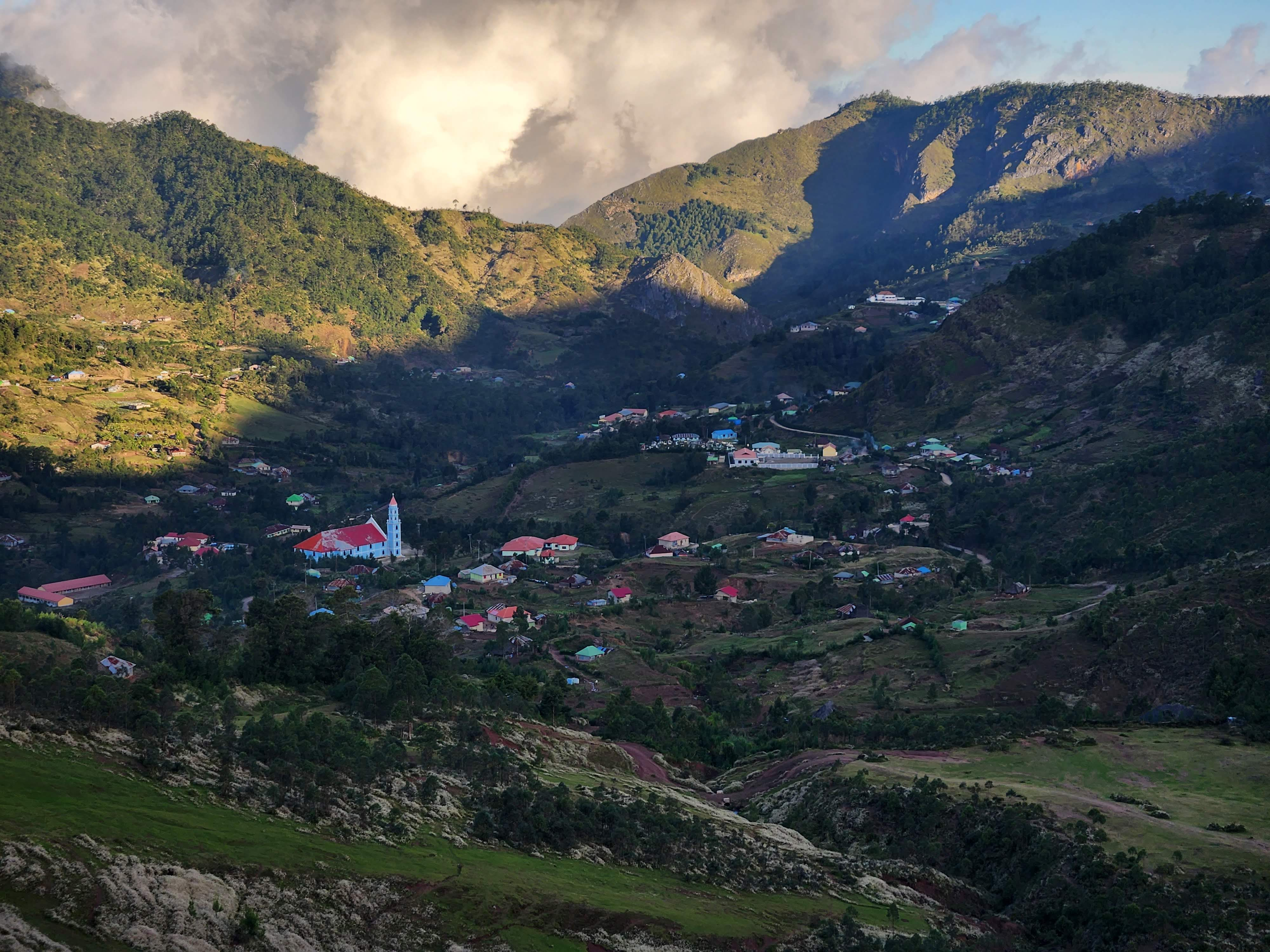
The Village of Hato Builico in the shadows of Tatamailau

The village of Hato Builico at the eastern base of Mount Ramelau is surrounded by volcanics and limestones of the Maubisse Formation, with the Aitutu limestone outcrops appearing south of the village. Hato Builico is in the heart of the Aitutu or Ramelau Anticline, a structural feature that creates the majority of the Ramelau Mountain Range. The Aitutu Formation is a very thick, cliff-forming limestone that creates large topographic reliefs between the Ramelau Range and the Wai Luli Valley to the south. The Aitutu Formation is Triassic in age, and is underneath the Permian Maubisse Formation, meaning thrusting of older material over younger material took place during collision of Australia and Asia.

== See also ==
- List of ultras of the Malay Archipelago
- List of elevation extremes by country
- List of Important Bird Areas in Timor-Leste
