= Mambai people =

Mambai people Mambae / Manbae / Maubere
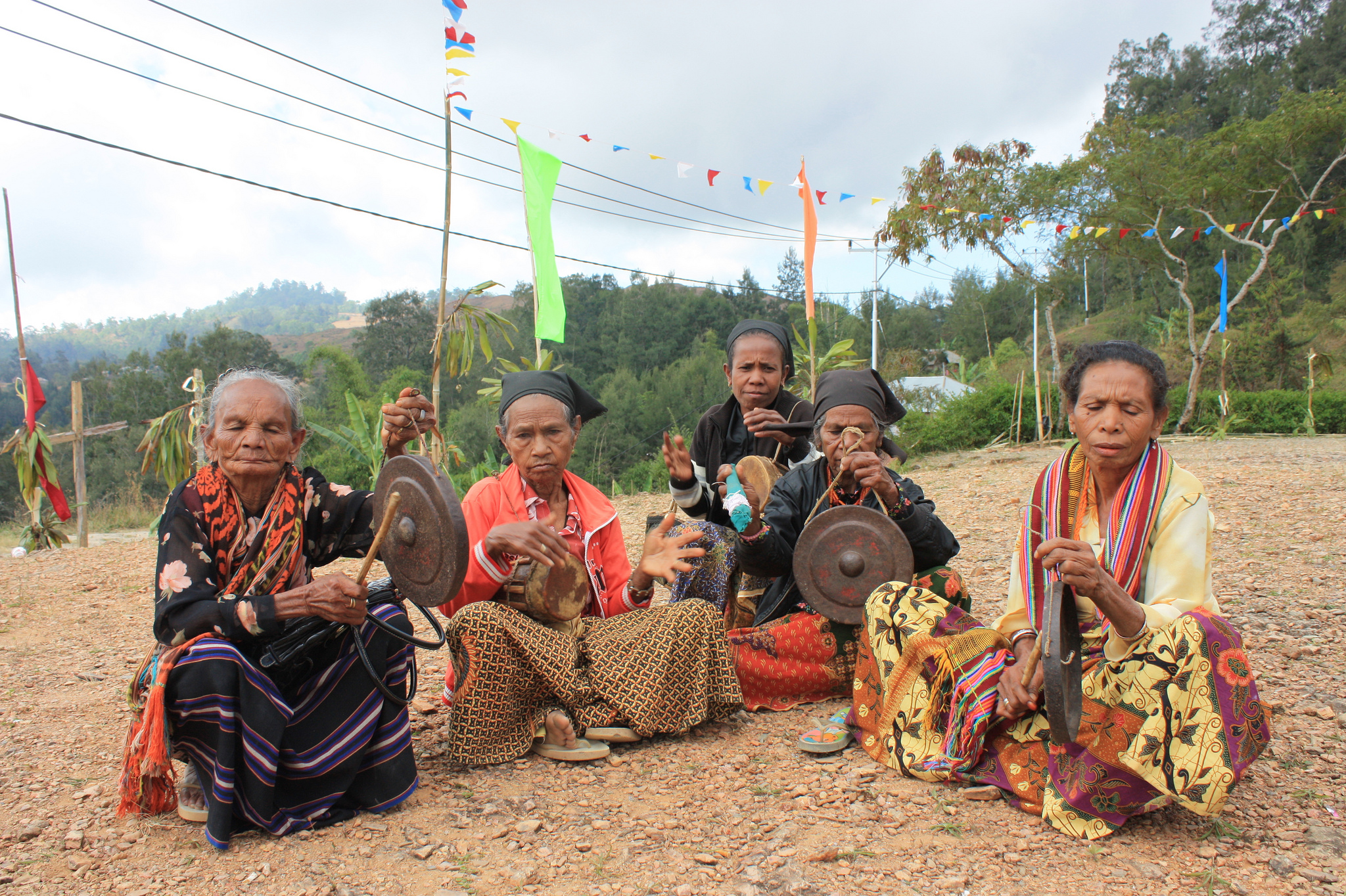
- Orchestra in front of a church in Suco Ducurai, Letefoho Subdistrict, Ermera District, Timor Leste.

Total population
- 195.778 (2015)

Regions with significant populations
- East Timor (Dili District)

Languages
- Mambai language, Tetun, Portuguese

Religion
- Catholic (predominantly), traditional beliefs

Related ethnic groups
- Kemak people, Melanesians, Austronesians

The Mambai (Mambae, Manbae) people are the second largest ethnic group after the Tetun Dili people in East Timor. Originally, they were known as the Maubere by the Portuguese. Maubere or Mau Bere is a widespread male first name among the Mambai people.

== Settlement area ==
The Mambai number about 80,000 from the interior of Dili District to the south coast of the territory, especially in the districts of Ainaro and Manufahi. Its principal centers are Ermera, Aileu, Remexio Administrative Post, Turiscai, Maubisse, Ainaro and Same, East Timor. Among the East Timorese exiles in Australia, the Mambai people are one of the main groups.

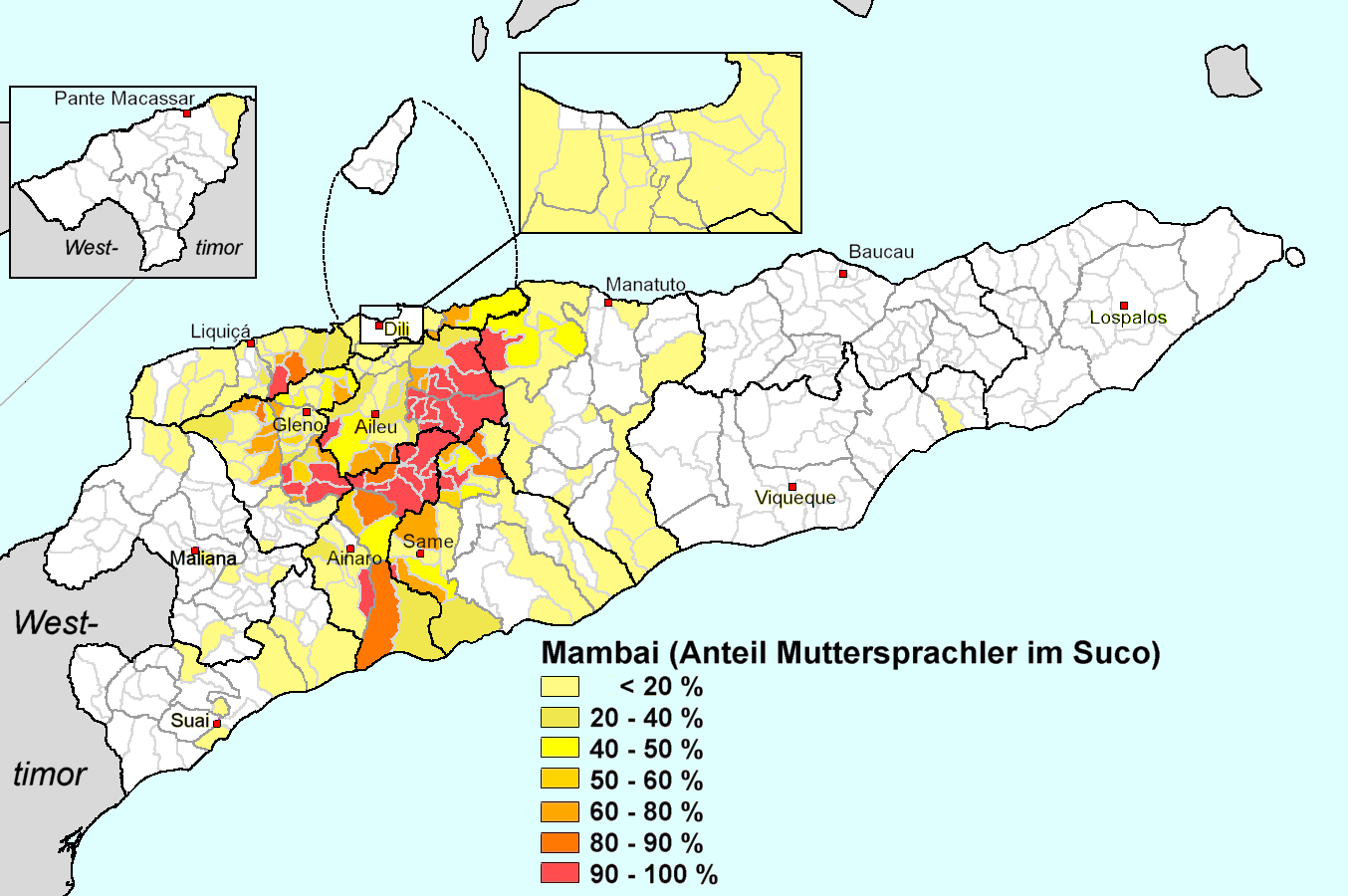
Percentage of people using Mambai language (Timor) as mother tongue in Sucos of East Timor (Timor-Leste), according to the census of 2010.

== Culture ==
The Mambai language belongs to the Central–Eastern Malayo-Polynesian languages of the Timoric languages branch. It is the second most common mother tongue in East Timor with 195,778 speakers.

Circular houses with conical roofs are typical dwellings, and the Mambai cultivate maize, rice, and root vegetables.

== Notable people ==
Ethnically Mambai politicians include Francisco Xavier do Amaral, Manuel Tilman, Lúcia Lobato, and Fernando de Araújo.
