= Subdivisions of Timor-Leste =

Timor-Leste is divided into:

- Cultural Regions:
  - Loro Munu
  - Loro Sae
- Municipalities of Timor-Leste (14)
- Administrative posts of Timor-Leste (65)
- Sucos of Timor-Leste (452)
- Aldeias of Timor-Leste (2,233)
