= Loro Munu =

Region in East Timor

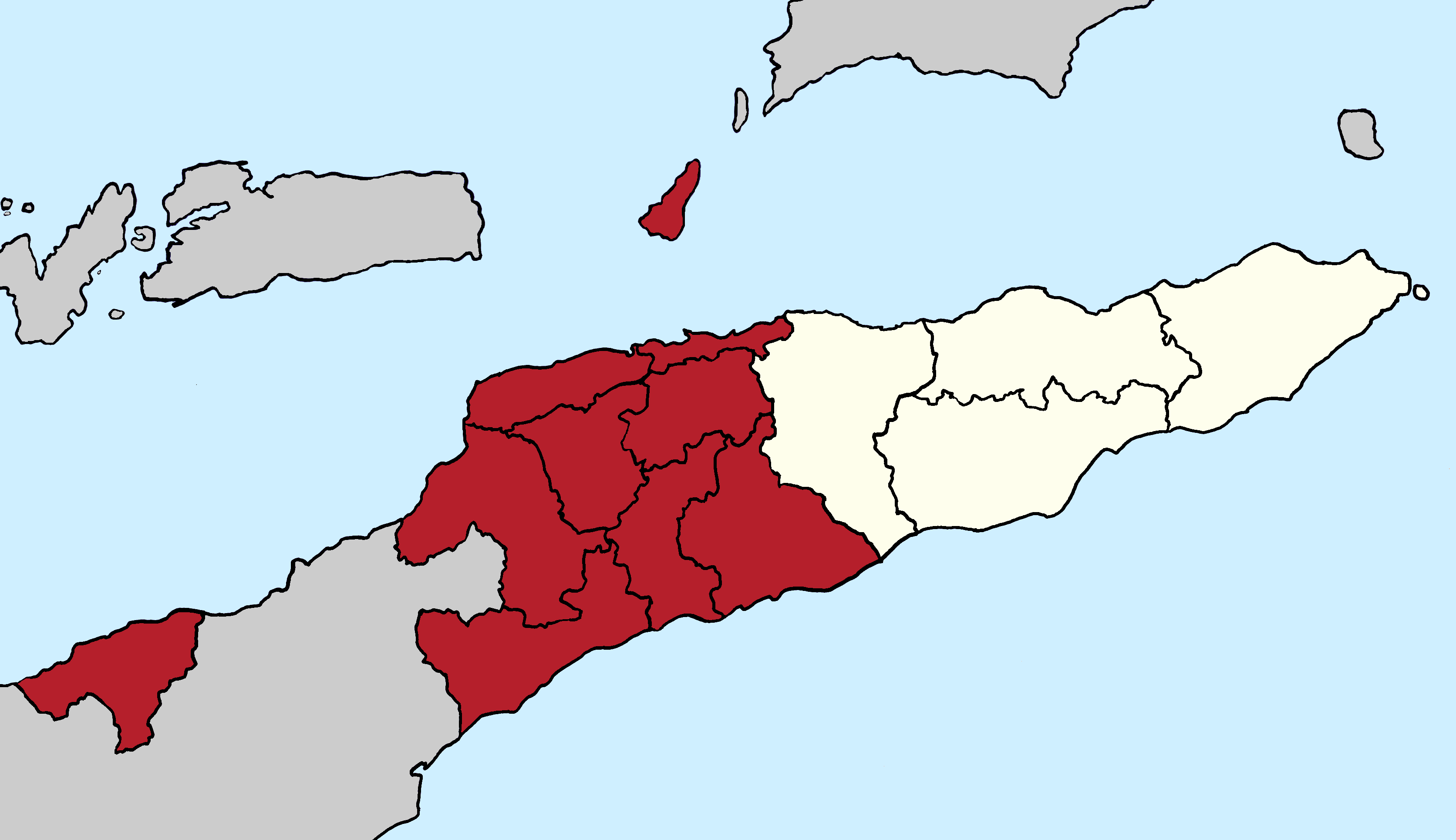
Cultural regions of East Timor: Loro Munu Loro Sae

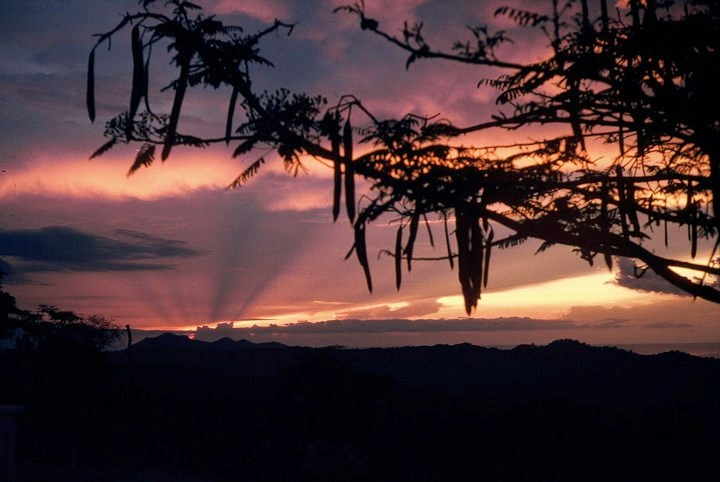
Land of the setting sun - Sunset in Atsabe (Ermera)

Loro Munu refers to the western part of East Timor. In the past, the name was used for the western part of the island of Timor, as "Loro Munu" means setting sun or simply west.

== Background ==
The inhabitants of Loro Munu are called Kaladi regardless of their other ethnic affiliation. In contrast, the eastern part of the country is called Loro Sae and its inhabitants Firaku. As a melting pot of the country's various ethnicities and groups, the state capital Dili is the scene of regular street fights between gangs from the east and west.

The name Kaladi for the western East Timorese is probably derived from the Portuguese calado (quiet, silent). Governor Luís Augusto de Almeida Macedo reports in his diary how Chinese traders sold forbidden goods, possibly weapons, to the Callady in the mountains. His successor Afonso de Castro calls the language of the inhabitants in the mountains around Dili Calado. The inhabitants of Loro Munu were said to be somewhat "slow and quiet" and far less rebellious than Loro Sae. Another theory assumes that Kaladi was a self-designation of the Mambai people, which was later adopted in the Tetum as the name for all inhabitants of the mountains in the centre of Timor.

Loro Munu consists of the municipalities of Dili, Aileu, Ainaro, Manufahi, Ermera, Bobonaro, Cova Lima, Liquiçá and the special administrative region of Oe-Cusse Ambeno. Sometimes the municipality of Manatuto is also counted as part of the west.

Despite the strong national movement from which the country emerged, the unrest of 2006 has once again brought to the fore the division of the country into eastern and western parts, which existed before the colonial era and has a clear influence on everyday life in East Timor. The centre of the island of Timor was dominated on both sides of the current border by the Wehale Kingdom and its centre Laran. There were only loose ties with the east. The east may also have been subject to tribute from Wehale. When the island was finally divided between Portugal and the Netherlands, Wehale's power collapsed. While Laran sided with the Netherlands, several rulers who had previously been dependent on him decided in favour of an alliance with the Portuguese. These territories now formed the colony of Portuguese Timor together with the eastern territories.

Although there were always internal disputes, these were usually only short tribal wars rather than protracted conflicts. The division between East and West was of secondary importance and was mostly masked by political interests. In the civil war of 1975, for example, the front between Fretilin and UDT cut across the regions and ethnic groups. But as early as 1975, the Fretilin politician Mau Lear warned of the tensions between the two parts of East Timor in his treatise "The Establishment of New Relations in East Timor". After liberation from the Indonesian occupation, the weak division developed into a clear dividing line. The Firaku claim to have carried out the greater part of the resistance against the Indonesians.

The Firaku accuse the Kaladi of sympathising with the occupying forces during the Indonesian occupation. Many of the police recruited by the Indonesians were Kaladi. The United Nations and the independent East Timor have taken most of these police officers into their service. The smouldering conflict between the police and the military, which is dominated by Firaku, is a result of this.

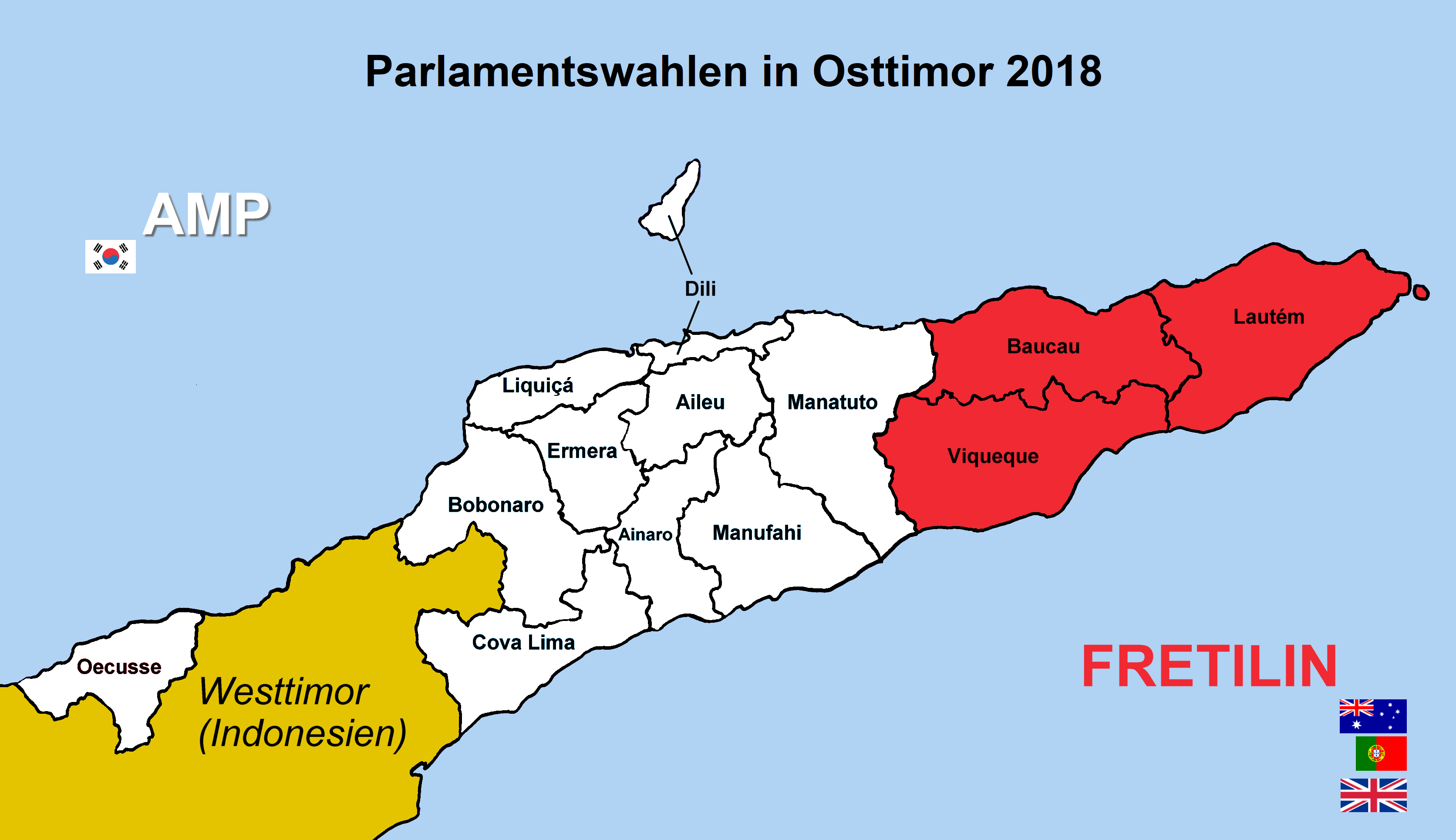
The strongest parties in the individual municipalities in the 2018 parliamentary elections

Today, a political division of the country is also noticeable. In the east, the left-wing old independence party Fretilin still dominates, while in the west, the ruling party National Congress for Timorese Reconstruction (CNRT) is in the lead.

== See also ==
- Loro Sae
- History of East Timor
