= Mahidi =

Pro-Indonesian Militia in East Timor

- Mahidi t-shirt lettering
- Leader: Câncio Lopes de Carvalho
- Founded: December 1998
- Dates active: 1999–2000
- Country: East Timor
- Headquarters: Ainaro, East Timor
- Active regions: East Timor
- Political position: Right-wing
- Status: Defunct

The Mahidi (Indonesian: Mati Hidup dengan Indonesia, lit. 'Live and Die with Indonesia') was a militia in East Timor loyal to Indonesia. Its origin is traced back to groups who lost lands and power for fighting the Portuguese and those who collaborated with the Japanese during World War II. The militia was founded in December 1998 and its operations were centered around the Cassa area in the southern Ainaro district. The location is strategic since it is at the crossroads between Manufahi, Ainaro, and Cova Lima districts. Mahidi participated in the 1999 East Timorese crisis, and the group was one of the most violent of the armed forces during the crisis. They were linked to the Suai Church massacre which led to around 200 deaths as well as other mass killings.

== History ==
The head of the militia was Câncio Lopes de Carvalho. In December 1998, on behalf of the Kopassus, he revitalised a pro-integration youth movement that he had led in the early 1990s, and renamed it Mahidi. On 1 January 1999, the militia was ceremonially sworn in in the presence of the heads of the Indonesian police and military in Ainaro. Some members are said to have been pressed into the militia. Carvalho's brother Nemecio (also Remecio or Remesio) held the post of intelligence officer in the militia. The militia was formed as a result of the increasingly militant mood of independence supporters in the district of Ainaro. Some houses had gone up in flames. In April 1999, Mahidi had 1,000 to 2,000 members and around 500 firearms. Carvalho told the BBC in an interview that he had received an automatic weapon from the military command in Ainaro.

Mahidi had its headquarters in Cassa, Ainaro in the south of the municipality. There were branches in every village in Ainaro. A second centre was founded in Manutaci under Daniel Pereira. Under Vasco da Cruz, some of the militia extended into the neighbouring municipality of Cova Lima.

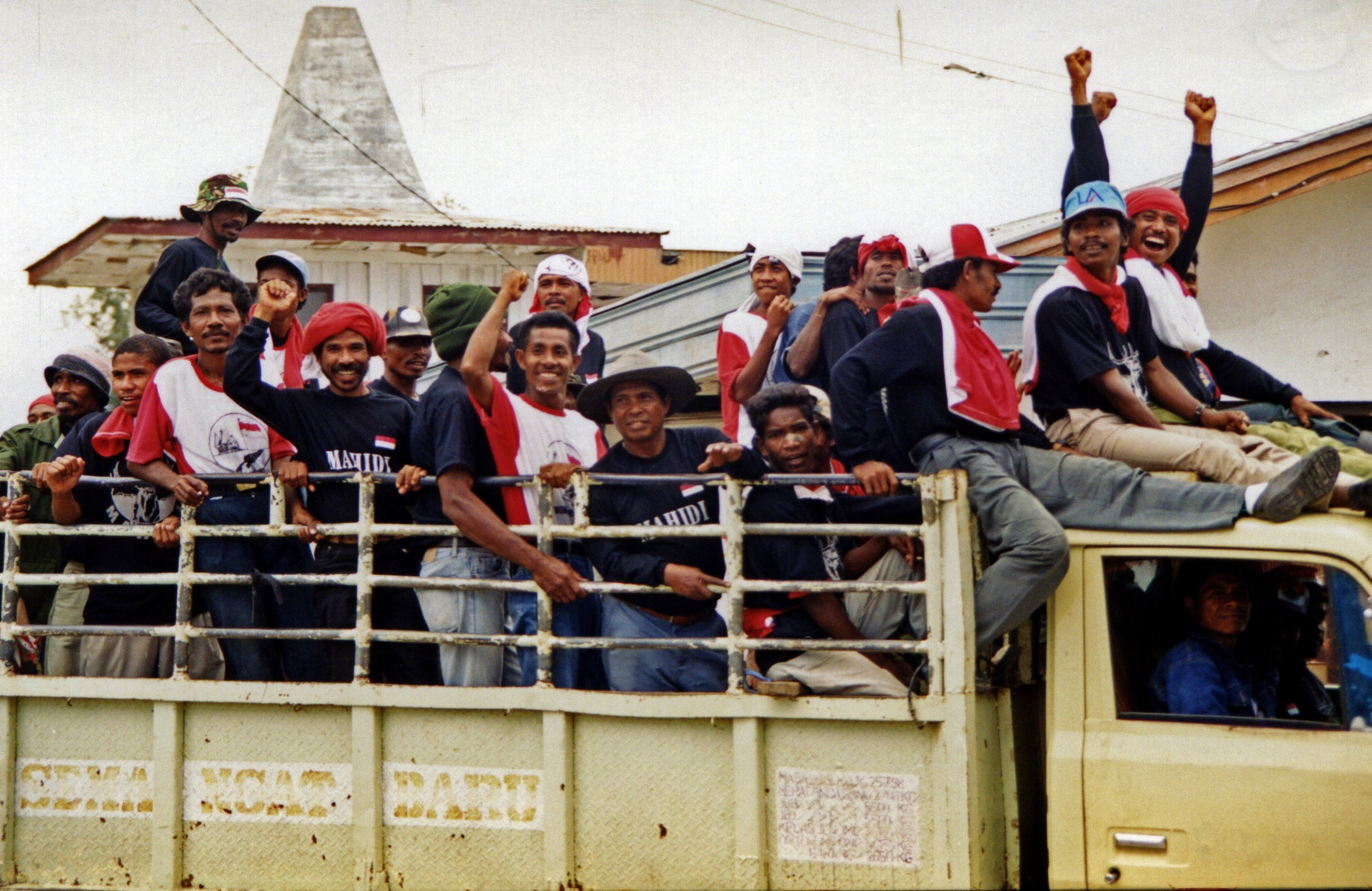
Members of Mahidi (1999)

In the course of 1999, the militiamen committed a large number of acts of violence during Operation Guntur, whom human rights supporters accuse of many crimes. The violence only came to an end with the arrival of the international INTERFET intervention force. Carvalho went to West Timor in Indonesia, where he settled and lived in camps. He had sought assistance from the Indonesian government, citing a perceived unreciprocated patriotic service to Indonesia.

In January 2000, in his unrelenting patriotism, he threatened to burn down the local Indonesian provincial capital, Kupang, with his militiamen if Indonesia forced the East Timorese refugees to return to East Timor. In October 2000, Carvalho declared that he had sent men from his militia to East Timor for guerrilla operations. At the same time, he offered the Secretary General of the United Nations information about the involvement of the Kopassus in the violence of 1999 in return for an amnesty on return to East Timor. UNTAET refused. By October 2001, several members had already went back to East Timor including 378 refugees led by Nemecio Lopes de Carvalho, the deputy commander of Mahidi.

on 28 February 2003, 22 Mahidi militiamen were charged with crimes against humanity. This included murder, torture, expulsion and abduction. Among them were Vasco da Cruz, Câncio Lopes de Carvalho, his brother Nemecio and Orlando Baptista. The indictment highlighted the murder of eleven civilians and the expulsion of the inhabitants of the village of Mau-Nuno on 23 September 1999, the murder of two youths on 3 January in Manutaci, the murder of four pro-independence activists on 25 January in Galitas, and the murder and persecution of several students in the district of Cova Lima on 13 April. However, all of the accused were no longer in East Timor at the time, but in Indonesia. Arrest warrants were applied for in the Dili District Court and forwarded to the Attorney General's Office of Indonesia and Interpol. With this notification, some militiamen were sentenced to prison.
