= Nemecio Lopes de Carvalho =

Nemecio Lopez de Carvalho
- Born: 1965 (age 60–61); Ainaro
- Other names: Nemesio or Remesio
- Occupation: Deputy commander (Mahidi)
- Years active: 1999-2001
- Known for: Maununu atrocity

Nemecio (also Nemesio or Remesio) Lopes de Carvalho (born around January 1965) is an East Timorese paramilitary figure noted for his activities during and after East Timor's bid for independence. He was the deputy commander of Mahidi, the pro-Indonesian militia group founded by his brother Cancio de Carvalho.

== Biography ==
Carvalho was one of the ten children of Mateus and Margarida Loped de Carvalho. Mateus was a Liurai of Cassa, a village of the Ainaro district.

Carvalho's brother Cancio de Carvalho established the Mahidi militia in 1988, due to the emergence of pro-independence sentiment in the town of Ainaro. Mahidi is an abbreviation for the Indonesian slogan, mati hidup untuk Indonesia ("Live or die for integration with Indonesia"). An account stated that Carvalho became its intelligence officer. Reports later revealed that he became Mahidi's deputy commander. Based on his claim, the militia was supported by the district of Ainaro's military command. The Mahidi began its operations ahead of the United Nations-sponsored referendum on independence on August 30, 1999. It continued after East Timor voted for independence.

The militia was accused of committing murders included the killing of individuals who supported East Timor's independence from Indonesia. Carvalho was accused of participating in several of these atrocities, which included the massacre in Maununu after the villagers refused to evacuate to West Timor. Leading 60 Mahidi militiamen, Carvalho reportedly attacked the village early in the morning, killing eleven and forcing the remaining survivors to evacuate. Carvalho was indicted for this killings along with 22 Mahidi militia members. He denied that he was involved in any killings.

In 2001, he returned to Dili in response to Xanana Gusmao's policy of reconciliation. According to the United Nations' estimate during this period, around 50,000 East Timorese refugees lived in West Timor as well as territories controlled by the militia. Together with 800 of his followers, Carvalho surrendered after crossing a UN-administered territory.
