= Loro Sae =

Region in East Timor

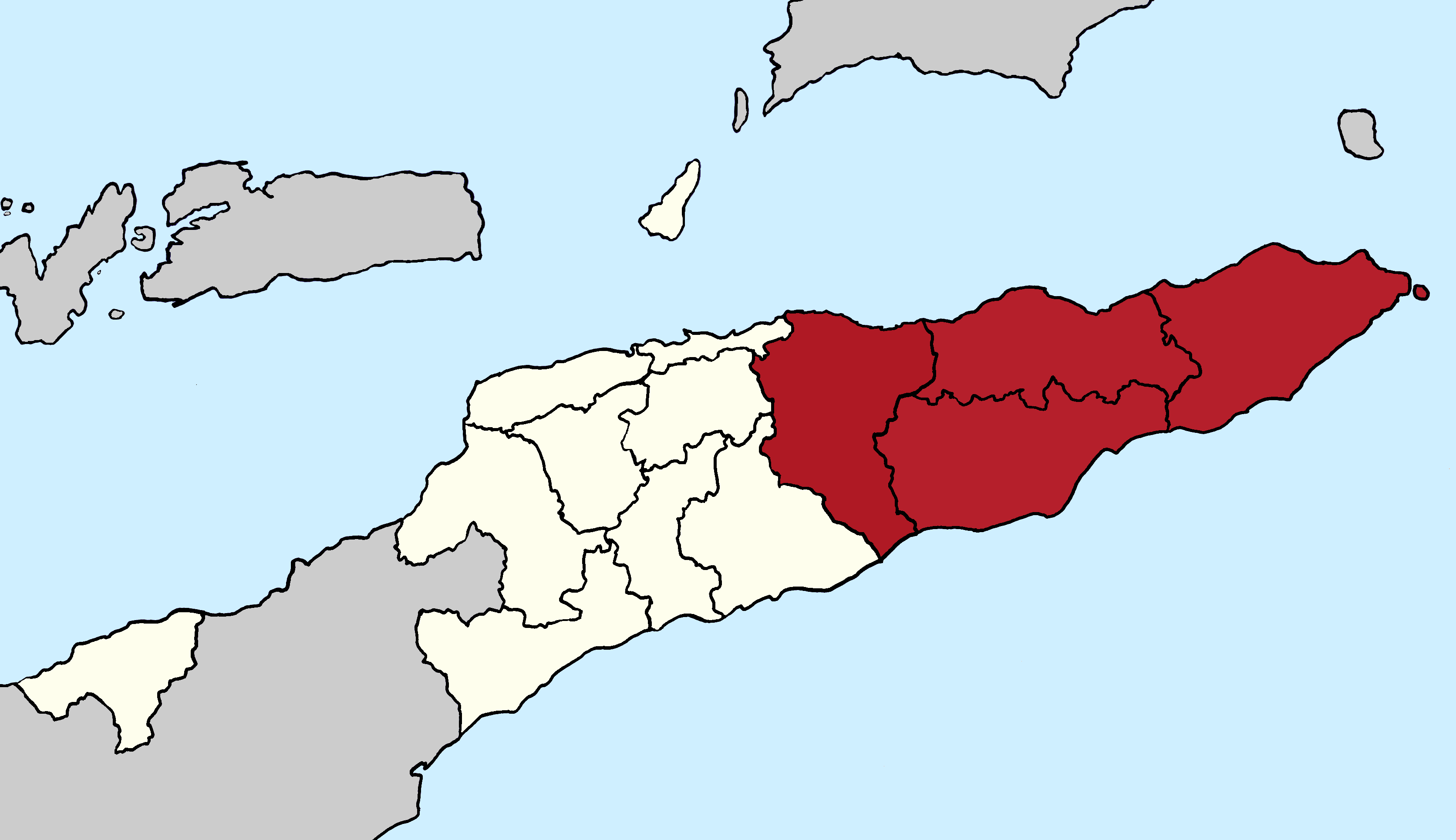
Cultural regions of Timor-Leste: Loro Sae Loro Munu

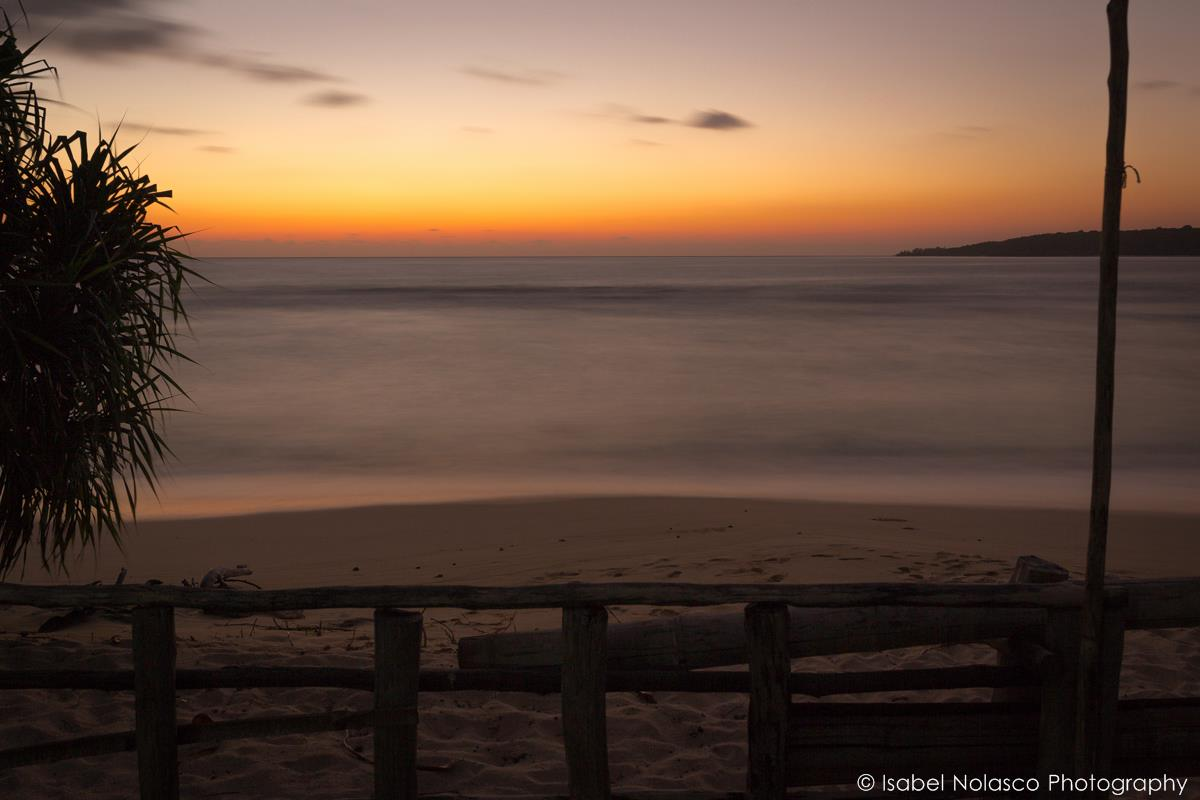
Sunrise at Valu Beach, in Timor-Leste

Loro Sae is the name of the eastern part of Timor-Leste. This leads to confusion, as the official name of the country in the official language Tetum is "Timór Loro Sa'e". Loro Sae means rising sun or simply east. The inhabitants of Loro Sae are called Firaku, regardless of their other ethnic affiliations. In contrast, the western part of the country is called Loro Munu and its inhabitants Kaladi. The country's capital, Dili, is a melting pot of the country's different ethnic groups and is the scene of regular street fights between gangs from the east and the west.

The name Firaku probably derives from the Portuguese "vira o cu" (to turn someone's back), which probably refers to the Eastern Timorese's alleged tendency to rebel and their supposed stubbornness and temperament. Another theory suspects that the word being Mambai Makassae origin. The later being "fi raku", meaning we comrades. The term was first used in the mid-19th century. The east consists of the communities of Lautém, Baucau, Viqueque and Manatuto. Sometimes Manatuto is also attributed to Loro Munu. The Firaku see themselves as those who defeated the Indonesian occupation forces through their long resistance. The Firaku include important East Timorese military figures and former President Xanana Gusmão.

Despite the strong national movement from which the country emerged, the 2006 riots have re-emphasised the division of the country into East and West, which existed before the colonial period and has a clear impact on everyday life in Timor-Leste. Before colonisation by Portugal, the east of the island of Timor formed a loose federation ruled by Likusaen (today: Liquiçá) or Luca. Ties to the Wehale Empire, which dominated the centre of the island, nevertheless existed. Among other things, it is reported that the eastern territories were subject to tribute. Later, the parts of Wehale that fell to Portugal when the island was divided with the Netherlands were united with the eastern provinces to form the colony of Portuguese Timor.

Although there were always internal disputes, they were mostly short tribal wars rather than protracted conflicts. The division into East and West was of secondary importance and was mostly covered by political interests. In the 1975 civil war, for example, the front between Fretilin and UDT cut across regions and ethnic groups. However, as early as 1975, Fretilin politician Mau Lear warned of the tensions between the two parts of East Timor in his paper "The Establishment of New Relations in East Timor". After the liberation from Indonesian occupation, the weak division developed into a clear dividing line. The Firaku claim to have done the greater part of the resistance against the Indonesians.

The Firaku accuse the West of sympathising with the Indonesians. Many of the policemen recruited by the Indonesians were Kaladi. The UN and independent Timor-Leste took most of these policemen into their service. The simmering conflict between the National Police and the military (Timor Leste Defence Force) is a result of this.

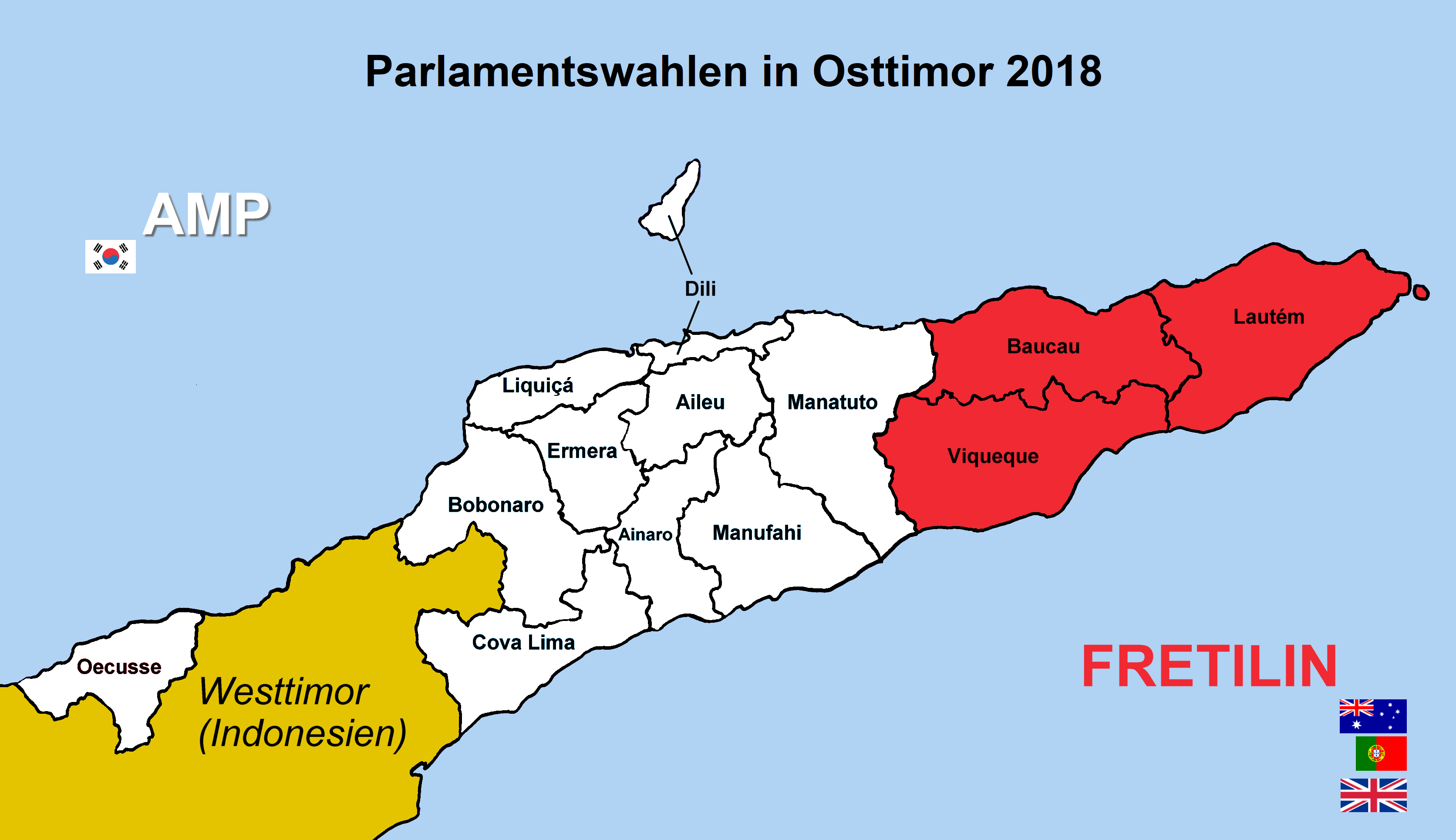
The strongest parties in each municipality in the 2018 general election

Today, one also notices a political division in the country. In the east, the left-wing old independence party Fretilin still dominates, while in the west the centre-left ruling party, the National Congress for Timorese Reconstruction, is in the lead.

== See also ==
- Loro Munu
- History of Timor-Leste
- Demographics of Timor-Leste
