= Hato-Udo Administrative Post =

Administrative post in Ainaro Municipality, East Timor

Hato-Udo
- Administrative Post
- Posto Administrativo de Hato-Udo (Portuguese); Postu administrativu Hatu-Udu (Tetum)
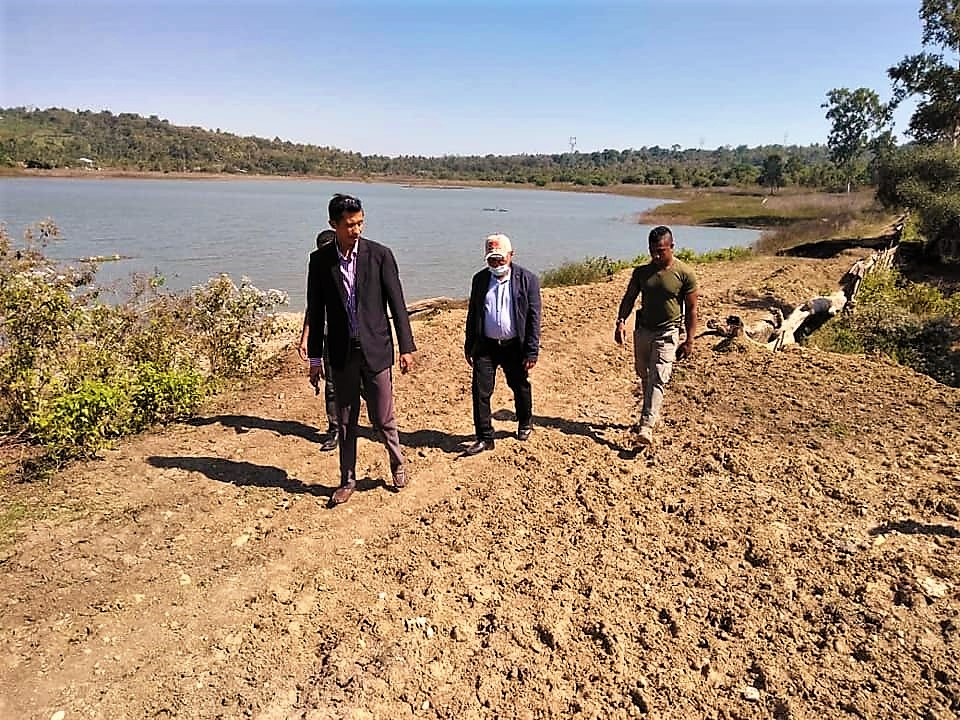
- Lake Lebomulua

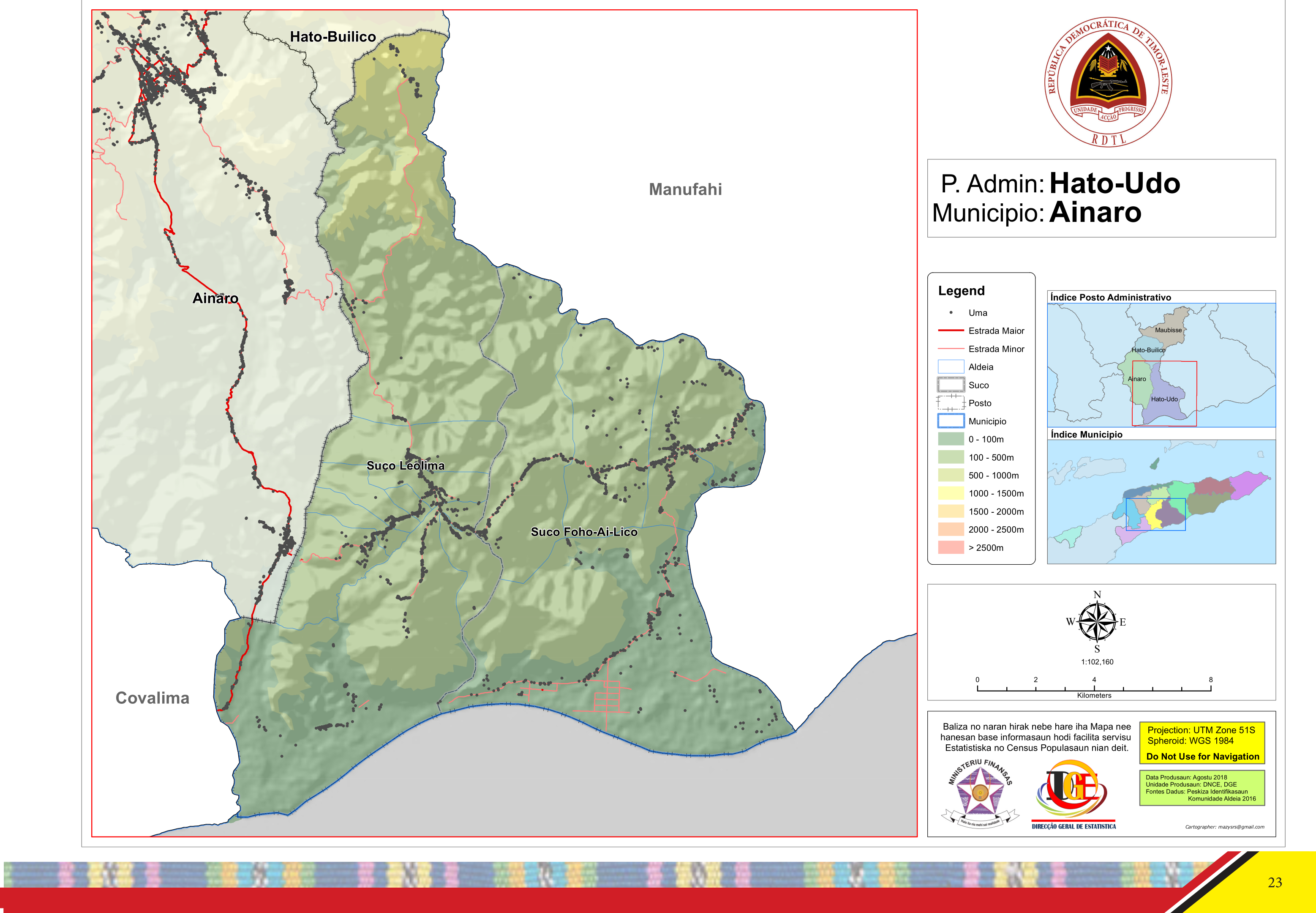
- Official map

- Location within East Timor
- Coordinates: 9°07′S 125°36′E
- Country: Timor-Leste
- Municipality: Ainaro
- Seat: Leolima
- Sucos: Foho-Ai-Lico; Leolima

Area
  - Total: 247.0 km^{2} (95.4 sq mi)

Population (2015 census)
  - Total: 10,299
  - Density: 41.70/km^{2} (108.0/sq mi)

Households (2015 census)
  - Total: 1,903
- Time zone: UTC+09:00 (TLT)

Hato-Udo (Hatu Udo, Hotudo), officially Hato-Udo Administrative Post (Portuguese: Posto Administrativo de Hato-Udo, Tetum: Postu administrativu Hatu-Udu), is an administrative post (and was formerly a subdistrict) in Ainaro municipality, Timor-Leste. Its seat or administrative centre is Leolima.
