= Maubisse Administrative Post =

Administrative post in Ainaro Municipality, Timor-Leste

Maubisse
- Administrative Post
- Posto Administrativo de Maubisse (Portuguese); Postu administrativu Maubise (Tetum)
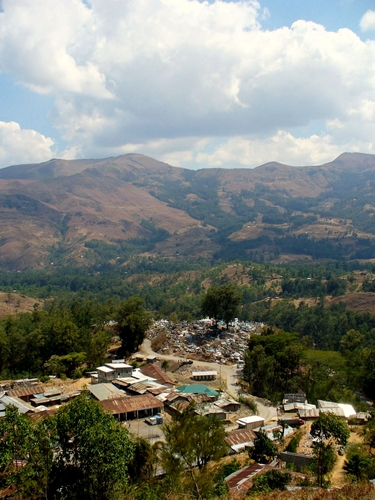
- The town of Maubisse

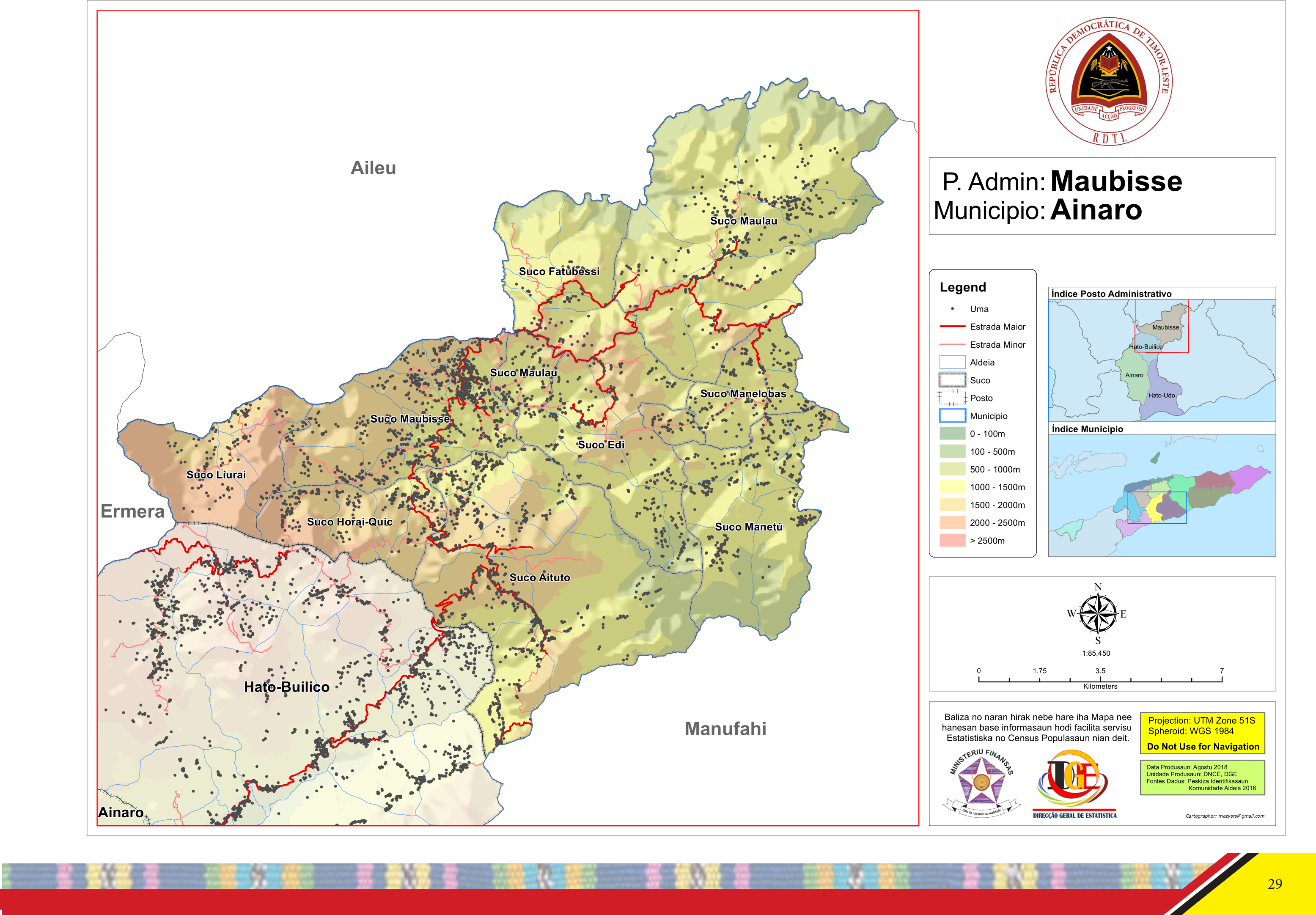
- Official map

- Location within East Timor
- Coordinates: 8°50′S 125°36′E
- Country: Timor-Leste
- Municipality: Ainaro
- Seat: Maubisse
- Sucos: Aituto; Edi; Fatubessi; Horai-Quic; Liurai; Manelobas; Manetú; Maubisse; Maulau

Area
  - Total: 191.6 km^{2} (74.0 sq mi)

Population (2015 census)
  - Total: 23,750
  - Density: 124.0/km^{2} (321.0/sq mi)

Households (2015 census)
  - Total: 3,774
- Time zone: UTC+09:00 (TLT)

Maubisse, officially Maubisse Administrative Post (Portuguese: Posto Administrativo de Maubisse, Tetum: Postu administrativu Maubise), is an administrative post (and was formerly a subdistrict) in Ainaro municipality, Timor-Leste. Its seat or administrative centre is Maubisse.
