= Maubisse =

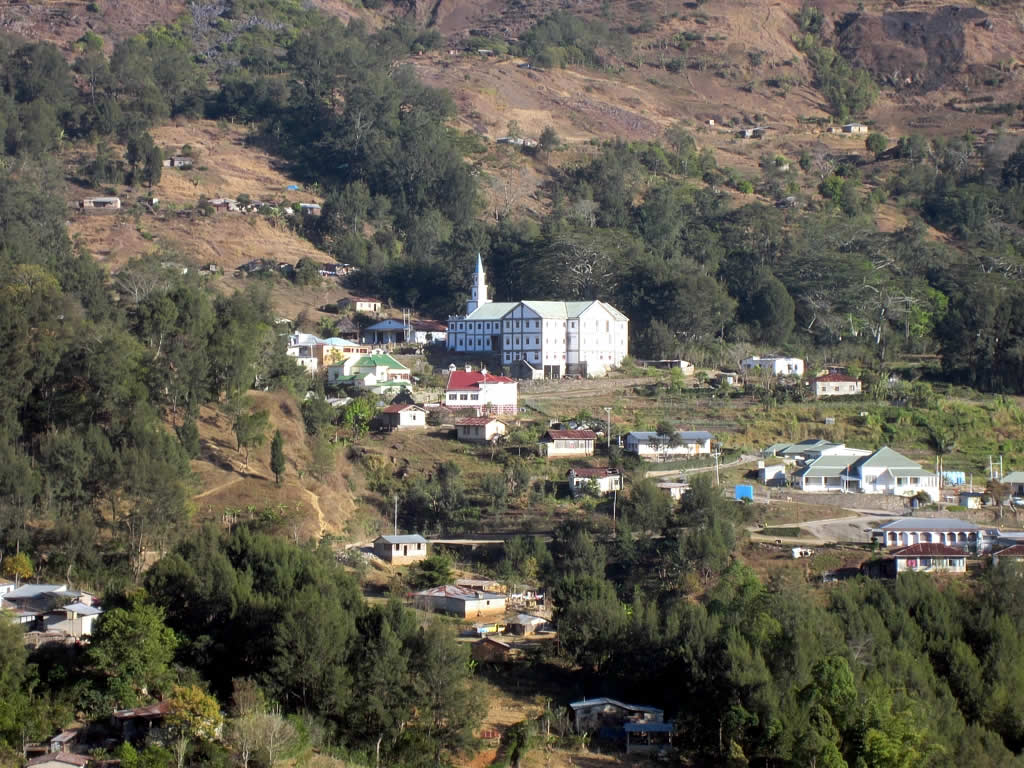

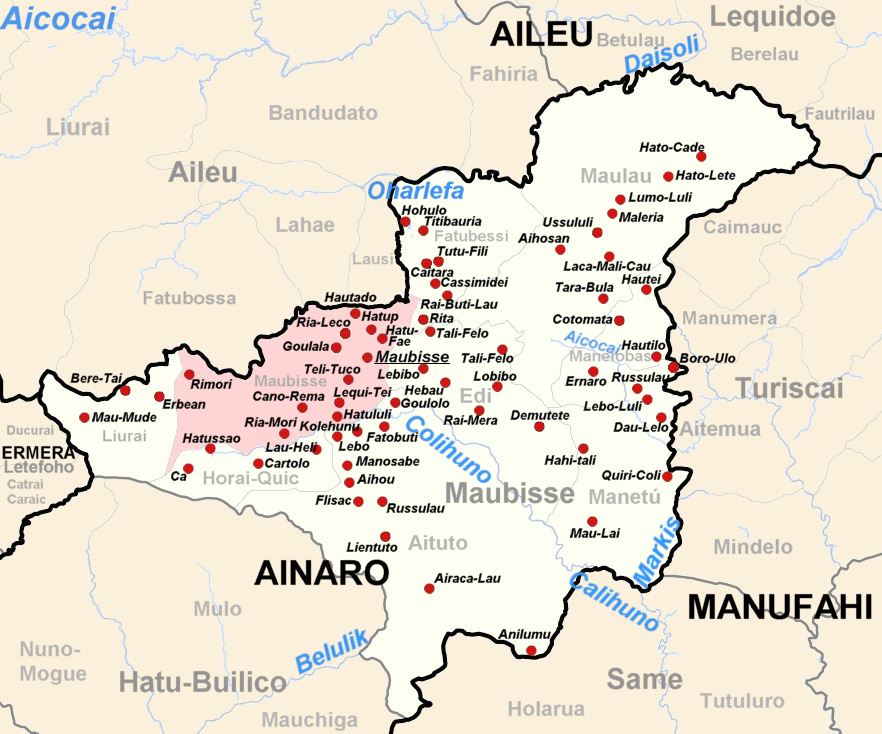
- Maubisse subdistrict

- Location in Timor-Leste
- Coordinates: 8°50′17″S 125°35′50″E
- Country: Timor-Leste
- District: Ainaro District
- Subdistrict: Maubisse Subdistrict
- Suco: Maubisse

Population (2015)
  - Total: 6,229
- Climate: Cwb

Maubisse (Maubesse, Mau-Bessi, Maobisse, Maubise) is a historic town in the hills 70 km south of Dili, in Ainaro Municipality, Timor-Leste. It is a popular tourist destination and a weekend visiting spot for people from the capital. The suco has 6,229 inhabitants (2015).

== Climate ==
Maubisse has a tropical savanna climate (Köppen Aw), bordering on a subtropical highland climate (Köppen Cwb) due to its high elevation.

Climate data for Maubisse
Month	Jan	Feb	Mar	Apr	May	Jun	Jul	Aug	Sep	Oct	Nov	Dec	Year
Mean daily maximum °C (°F)	23.9 (75.0)	23.6 (74.5)	23.7 (74.7)	23.7 (74.7)	23.1 (73.6)	22.6 (72.7)	22.6 (72.7)	23.7 (74.7)	25.7 (78.3)	26.8 (80.2)	26.5 (79.7)	24.7 (76.5)	24.2 (75.6)
Daily mean °C (°F)	20.3 (68.5)	20.1 (68.2)	20.1 (68.2)	19.9 (67.8)	19.5 (67.1)	18.7 (65.7)	18.3 (64.9)	18.5 (65.3)	20 (68)	21.2 (70.2)	21.6 (70.9)	20.8 (69.4)	19.9 (67.9)
Mean daily minimum °C (°F)	18.2 (64.8)	17.9 (64.2)	17.7 (63.9)	17.3 (63.1)	16.9 (62.4)	15.9 (60.6)	15 (59)	14.3 (57.7)	15.4 (59.7)	16.9 (62.4)	18.1 (64.6)	18.4 (65.1)	16.8 (62.3)
Average rainfall mm (inches)	356 (14.0)	331 (13.0)	312 (12.3)	194 (7.6)	88 (3.5)	46 (1.8)	23 (0.9)	10 (0.4)	17 (0.7)	45 (1.8)	164 (6.5)	340 (13.4)	1,926 (75.9)
Source: Climate-Data.org
