= Mambae language =

Austronesian language in Timor-Leste

Mambae
- Native to: Timor-Leste
- Ethnicity: Mambai people
- Native speakers: 130,000 (2010 census)
- Language family: Austronesian: Malayo-Polynesian; Central–Eastern; Central Timor; Nuclear Central Timor; Mambae

Official status
- Recognised minority language in: Timor-Leste

Language codes
- ISO 639-3: mgm
- Glottolog: mamb1306
- ELP: Mambae
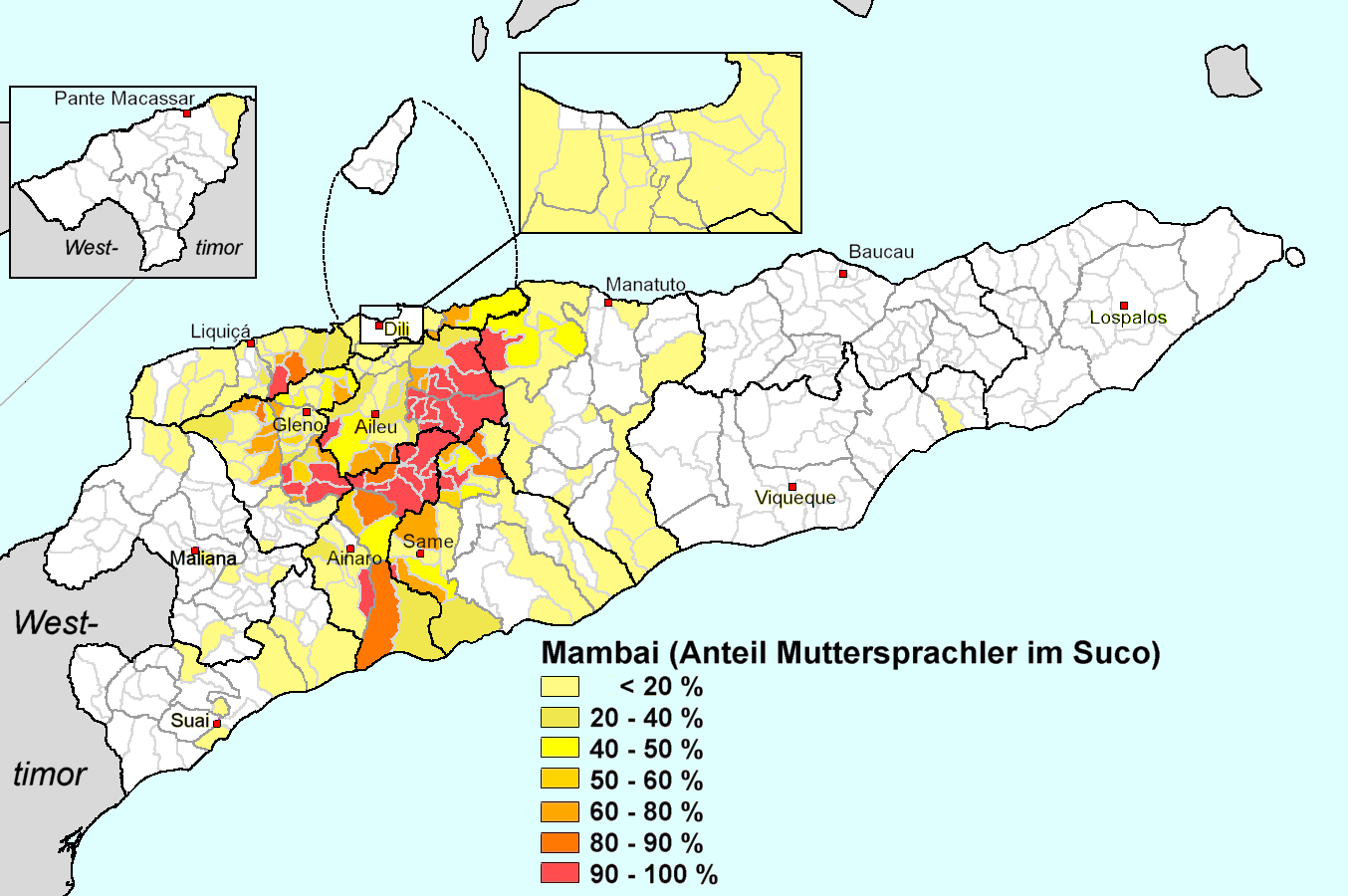
- Distribution of Mambai mother-tongue speakers in East Timor

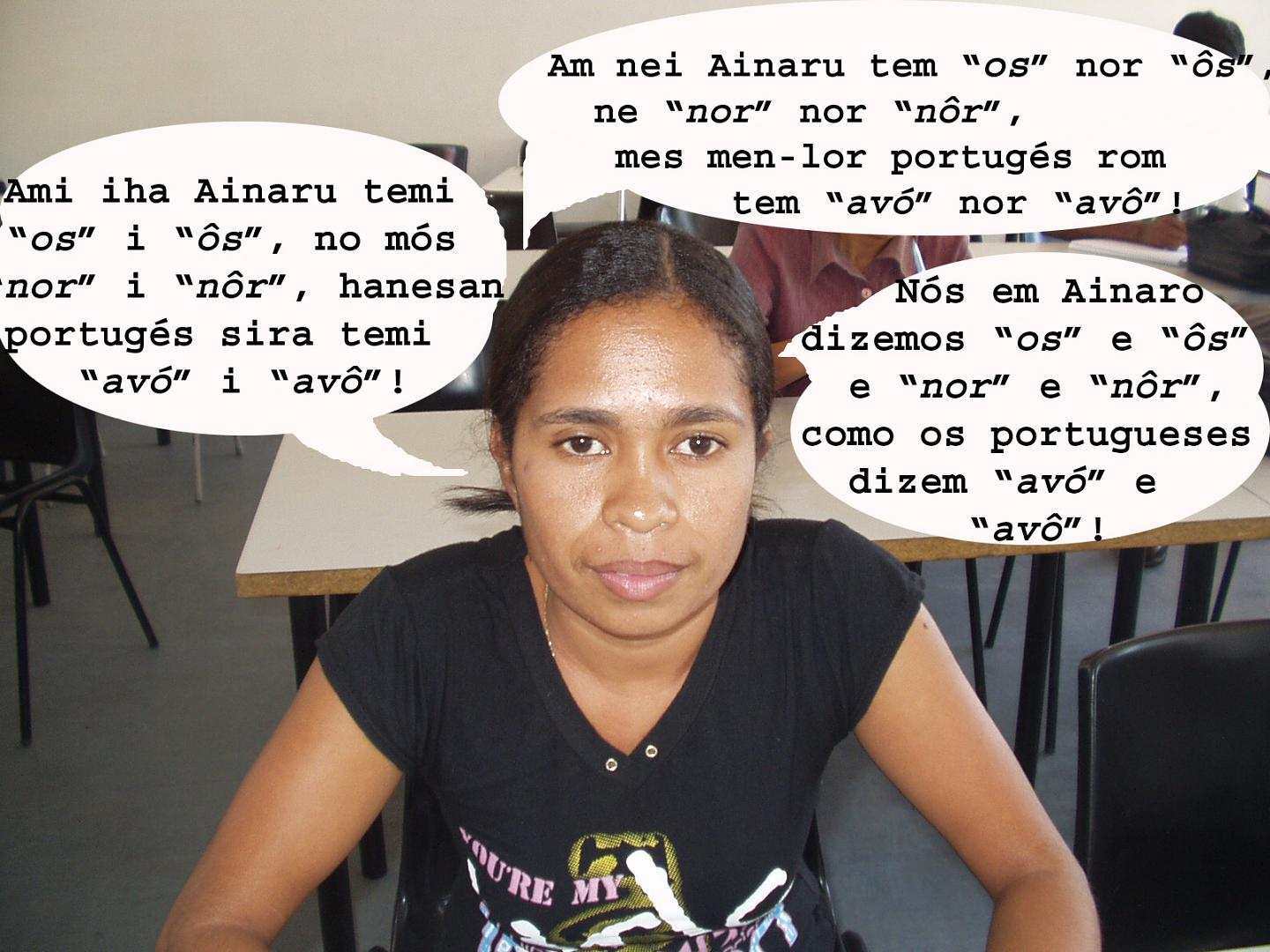
An illustration of Tetum language (left), Mambai language (center) and Portuguese language (right) being compared to one another.

Mambae, also called Mambai or Manbae, is a language spoken by the Mambai people, the second largest ethnic group in the island country of Timor-Leste.

== Geographic distribution ==
Mambae is one of 15 constitutionally recognized national languages. The main centers of Mambai are Ermera, Aileu, Remexio, Turiscai, Maubisse Administrative Post, Ainaro Administrative Post and Same Administrative Post. The majority of the Timorese community in Australia is native in Mambai.

Mambae used to be spoken in the area around Dili, when the Portuguese declared the city to be the capital of their colony Portuguese Timor. Therefore, the Tetum Prasa spoken in Dili is still exhibiting strong influences from its Mambai substrate.

== Phonology ==
=== Consonants ===
		Labial	Alveolar	Velar	Glottal
Nasal		m	n		
Plosive	voiceless	p	t	k	
Plosive	voiced	b	d	ɡ	
Fricative		f	s		h
Trill			r		
Approximant			l		

- /r, h, k/ can also be heard as [ɾ, ħ, ʔ].
- /p, k/ can also be heard as aspirated [pʰ, kʰ].
- /d/ is also heard as a voiced post-alveolar stop [d̠].
- /t/ is slightly aspirated [tʰ] before mid and low vowels. /t/ can also have an allophone [ts] when preceding high vowels.
- The plosives /p, b, t, d, k/ are unreleased [p̚, b̚, t̚, d̚, k̚] in word-final position.

=== Vowels ===
	Front	Central	Back
Close	i		u
Close-mid	e		o
Open-mid	ɛ		ɔ
Open		a	

- /i, u/ can also have shortened allophones [ɪ, ʊ].

Diphthongs
	Front	Central	
Close		ai	au
Mid	ei	ae	ao

== Dialects ==
Mambae can be divided into three dialects according to Fogaça (2017):

Northwest

- Liquiça: Bazartete
- Ermera: Hatulia
- Ermera: Railaco

Northeast-Central

- Aileu: Laulara
- Aileu: Vila Grupo
- Aileu: Liquidoe
- Ainaro: Hatu-Builico

South

- Ainaro: Hato-Udo
- Manufahi-Same: Letefoho
- Manufahi-Same: Betano

Examples of dialectal variation in Mambae:

Numerals
Numeral	Northeast-Central	Northwest	South
1	iid	iid	iid
2	ruu	ruu	ruu
3	teul	teul	teul
4	faat	paat	faat/paat
5	liim	liim	liim
6	neen	hohon iid	liim nai-ida
7	hitu	hohon ruu	liim nai-rua
8	ualu	hoho teul	liim nai-telu
9	sia	hoho paat	liim nai-fata/pata
10	saguul	sakuul	saguul
20	rua nuul	guul ruu	(saguul) haet rua
30	teul nuul	guul teul	(saguul) haet teul
40	faat nuul	guul paat	(saguul) haet faat/paat
50	lima nuul	guul liim	(saguul) haet liim

Pronouns
Pronoun	Northeast-Central	Northwest	South
1.SG	au	au	au
2.SG	iit	iit	iit
3.SG	ua	ua	ura
1.PL, inclusive	iit	iit	iit
1.PL, exclusive	aem	aem	aem
2.PL	iim	iim	iim
3.PL	roo	roo	room

Lexicon
Gloss	Northeast-Central	Northwest	South
'house'	pada	fada	uum
'short'	bloko	pada	bada
'wet'	broe	tita	era
'dirty'	kiniri	rae	foer
'many'	doto	klen	rini
'lie (fib)'	bea	rau	halaet
'eat'	mua	muu	aa
'banana'	muka	mua	muu

Comparison of selected body part words in Mambae dialects:

gloss	Liquiça (Bazartete)	Ermera (Hatulia)	Ermera (Railaco)	Aileu (Laulara)	Aileu (Vila Grupo)	Aileu (Liquidoe)	Ainaro (Hatu-Builico)	Ainaro (Hato-Udo)	Manufahi-Same (Letefoho)	Manufahi-Same (Betano)
mouth	gugun	gugun	gugun	kukun	kukun	kukun	kukun	kuku	kuku	kuku
arm	liman	liman	liman	niman	niman	lima	liman	lima	lima	lima
elbow	lima sikun	liman sikun	siun	nima siun	nima siun	lima siun	lima siun	lima sikun	lima siku	lima siku
shoulder	kabaːs	kabasan	kabasan	kabaːs	kabasa	kabasa	kabaːs	labaːs	kabaːs	au balaːs
head	gnutan	glutan	ulun	ulun	ulun	ulun	glutan	ulu	ulu hatu	ulu
headache	gnutan baːn	glutan baːn	glutan baːn	ulun baːn	ulun baːn	glutan baːn	glutan baːn	ulu hatusae	ulu hatusae	ulu hatusae
hair	ulu nɔɾan	ulu laun	ulun	ulun lahon	ulu nɔɾa	ulun noran	ulun	ulu	ulu	ulu noɾa
black hair	ulu meta	ulu meta	ulu meta	ulun meta	ulu nɔɾa mɛta	ulun meta	ulun meta	ulu meta	ulu mɛta	ulu laha meta
flesh (human)	ɛta lɔlon	etan	etan	etan	ɛtan	etan	ɛtan	eta lɔlo	ɛta lɔlo	eta lolo
heart	hua	huan	huan	huan	huan	huan	huan	hua	hua	hua
back	hɔhon tɛten	hoho teten	hɔhon	hoho tɛten	hɔhon	hoho tɛten	asa	hɔho	hɔhɔ tɛte	hoho
tooth	nipan	nipan	nipan	nifan	nifan	nifan	nifan	nipa	nifa	nifa
finger	lima huan	lima huan	lima huan	nima huan	lima huan	lima kakun	lima huan	lima hua	lima hua	lima hua
liver	aten	aten	aten	aten	aten	aten	aten	ate	ate	ate
tongue	lamalaun	lamalaun	lamalau	lamalaun	laman	lamalaun	lamelaun	lama	lama	lama
hand	liman	liman	liman	niman	niman	liman	liman	lima	lima sanak	lima
nose	ilu	ilun	ilun	inun	inun	ilun	inun	ilu	ilu	ilu
eye	matan	matan	matan	matan	matan	matan	matan	mata	mata	mata
ear	teliga	tligan	tliga	kikan	kika nɔɾan	tika noɾan	kikan	teliga	teliga	teliga
bone	rui	ruin	ruin	ruin	ruin	ruin	ruin	rui	rui	rui
foot	ɔen	oen	ɔen	ɔɛn	ɔɛn	ɔɛn	ɔɛn	oe	ɔɛ	oɛ
skin	litan	eta litan	litan	litan	litan	litan	litan	tia	tia	eta tia
leg	ɔen	oen	ɔen	ɔɛn	ɔɛn	ɔɛn	ɔɛn	oe	ɔɛ	oɛ
neck	tgeun	tgeun	tgeun	tgeun	tgeun	kdeun		tgeu	tegeu	tegeu
blood	laɾa	laɾa	laɾa	laɾan	laɾa	lalan	laɾan	laːr	lara	laːr
