= Ainaro Administrative Post =

Administrative post in Ainaro Municipality, Timor-Leste

Ainaro
- Administrative Post
- Posto Administrativo de Ainaro (Portuguese); Postu administrativu Ainaru (Tetum)
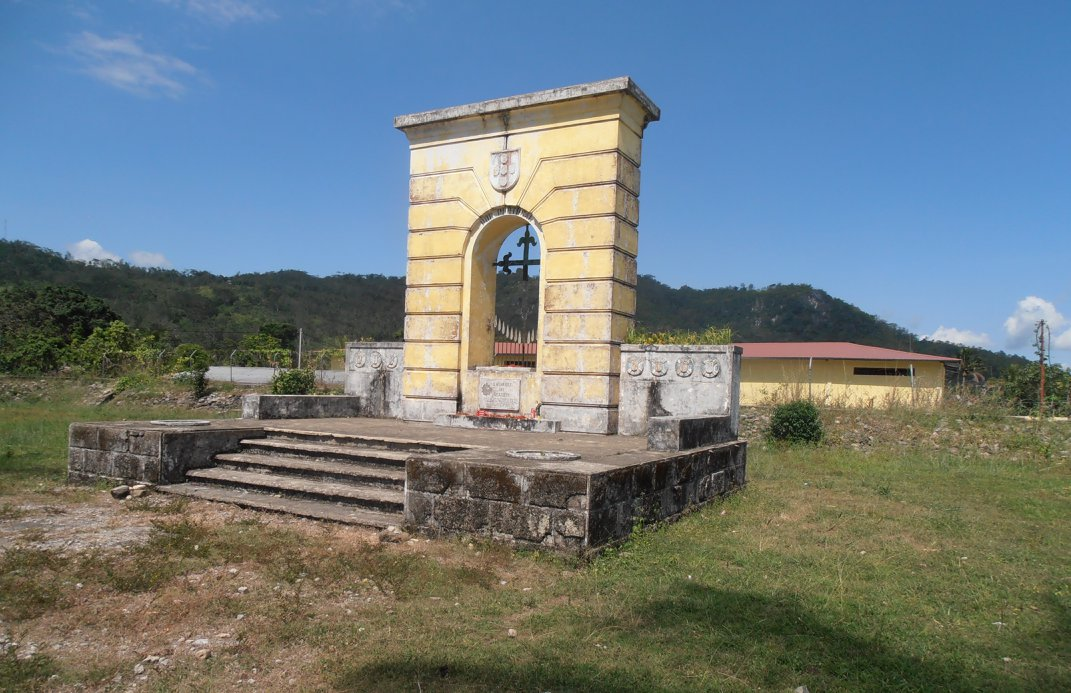
- Monument to Dom Aleixo in Ainaro

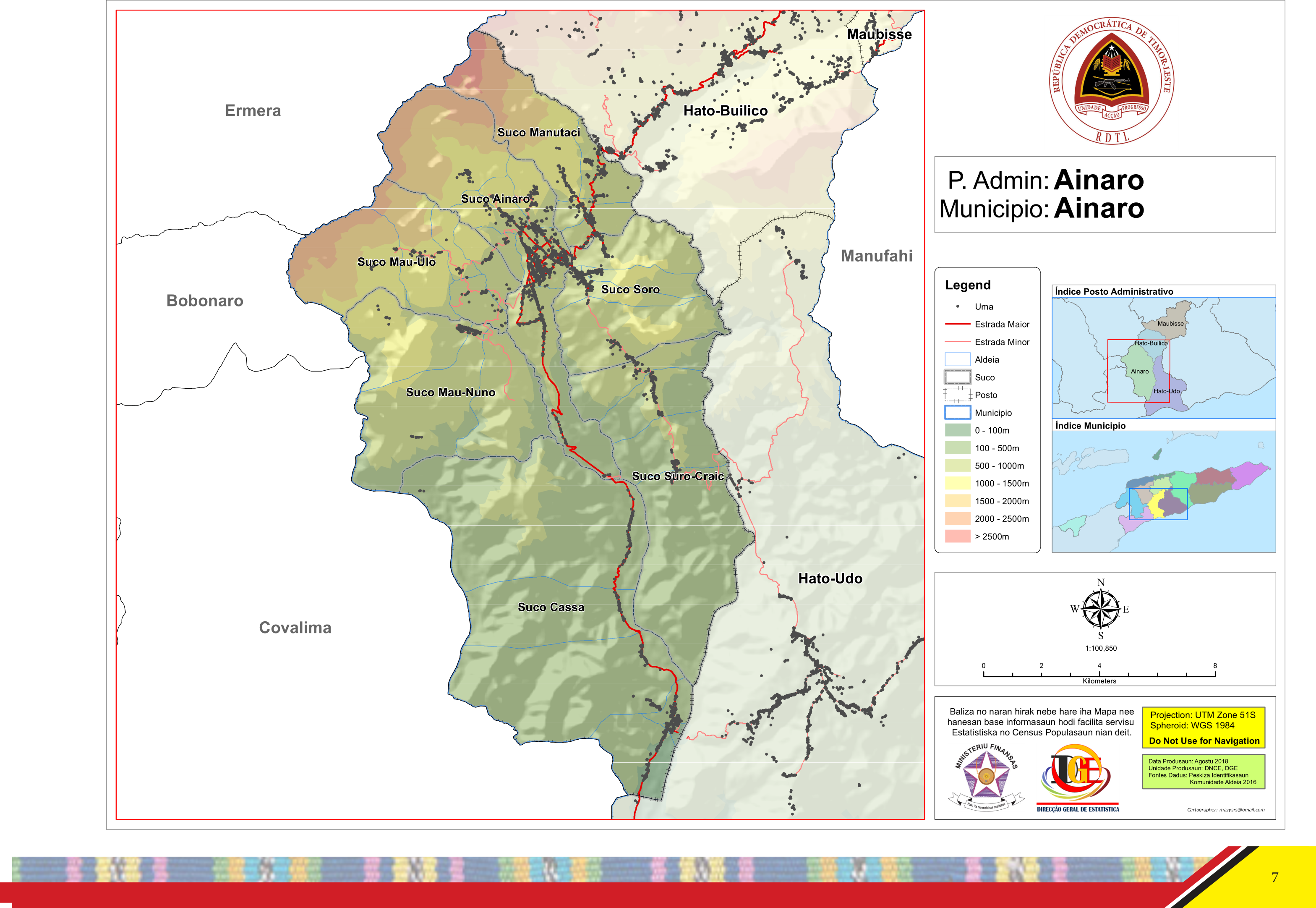
- Official map

- Location within East Timor
- Coordinates: 8°59′S 125°30′E
- Country: Timor-Leste
- Municipality: Ainaro
- Seat: Ainaro
- Sucos: Ainaro; Cassa; Manutaci; Mau-Nuno; Mau-Ulo; Soro; Suro-Craic

Area
  - Total: 234.7 km^{2} (90.6 sq mi)

Population (2015 census)
  - Total: 16,121
  - Density: 68.69/km^{2} (177.9/sq mi)

Households (2015 census)
  - Total: 2,755
- Time zone: UTC+09:00 (TLT)

Ainaro, officially Ainaro Administrative Post (Portuguese: Posto Administrativo de Ainaro, Tetum: Postu administrativu Ainaru), is an administrative post (and was formerly a subdistrict) in Ainaro municipality, Timor-Leste. Its seat or administrative centre is the suco of Ainaro.

The administrative post has a population of approximately 14,130 people (2001). It contains the small mountain town of Ainaro, which is also the capital of the municipality, along with the sucos of Ainaro, Soro, Maununo, Cassa, Suro Craic, Manutassi, and Mau-Ulo.
