= Ainaro Municipality =

Municipality of East Timor

Ainaro
- Municipality
- Município Ainaro (Portuguese); Munisípiu Ainaru (Tetun)
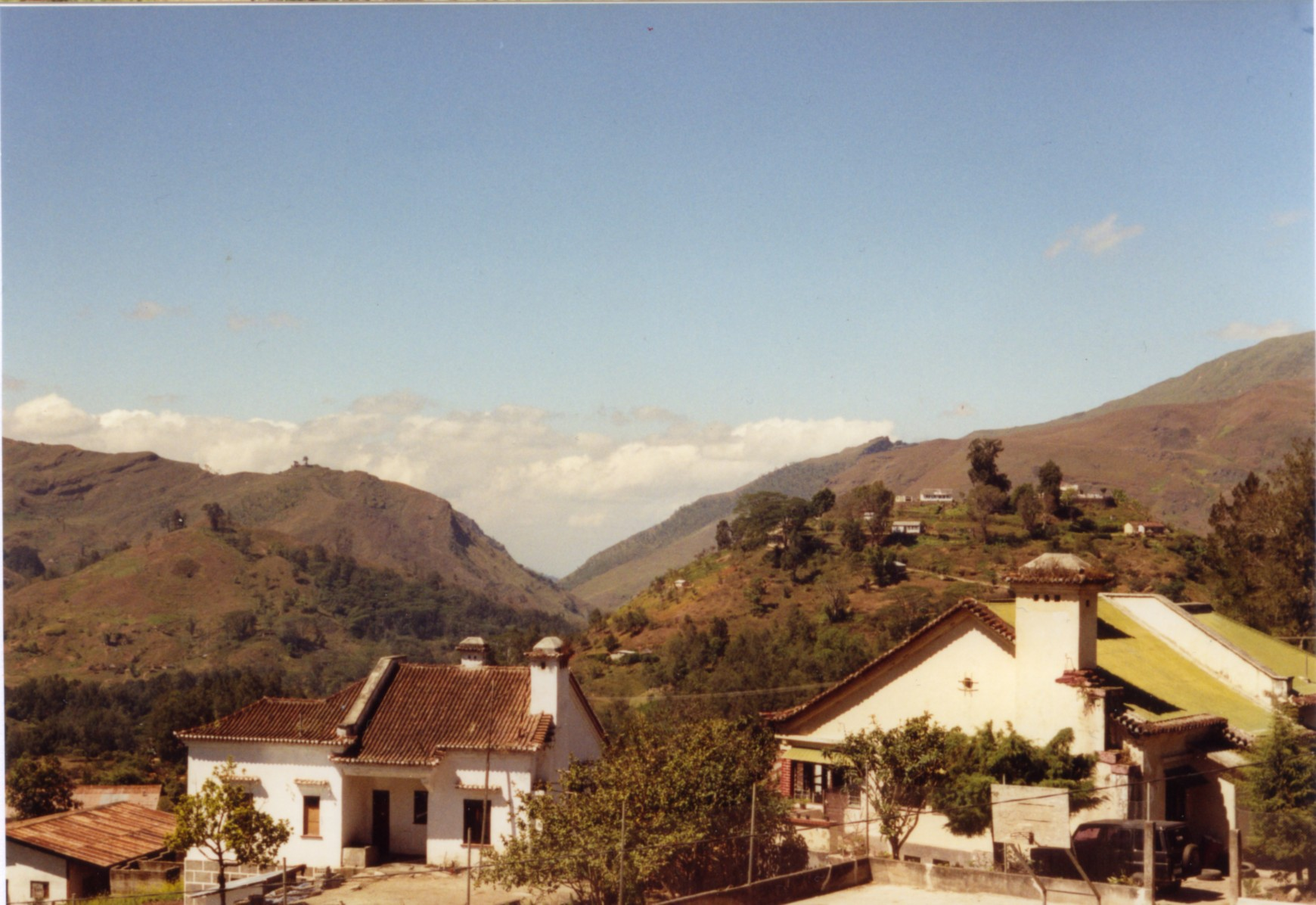
- Maubisse village

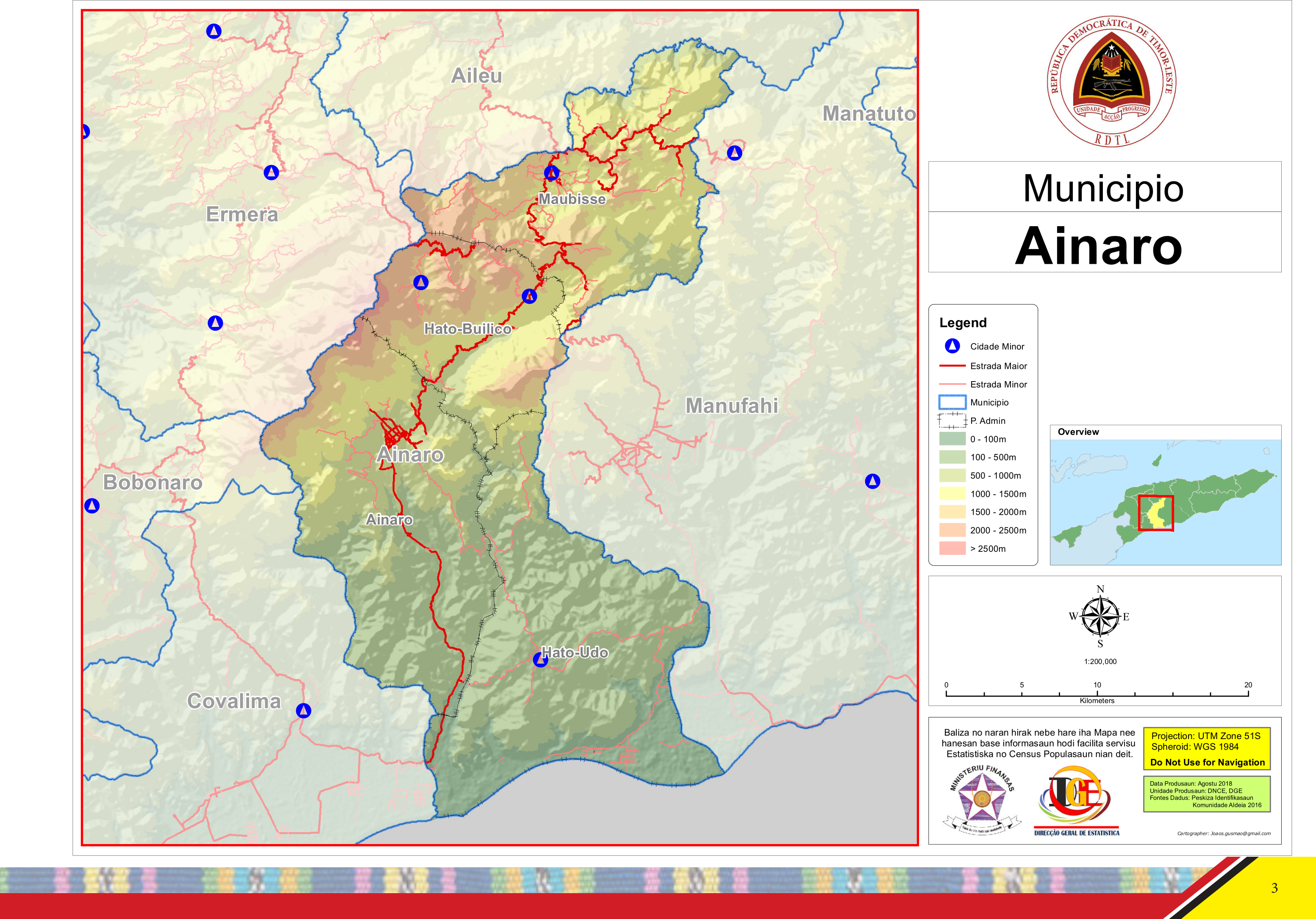
- Official map
- Interactive map of Ainaro
- Coordinates: 9°05′S 125°29′E
- Country: Timor-Leste
- Capital: Ainaro
- Administrative posts: Ainaro, Hato-Udo, Hatu-Builico, Maubisse

Area
  - Total: 802.6 km^{2} (309.9 sq mi)
  - Rank: 9th

Population (2015 census)
  - Total: 63,136
  - Rank: 10th
  - Density: 78.66/km^{2} (203.7/sq mi)
  - Rank: 6th

Households (2015 census)
  - Total: 10,601
  - Rank: 9th
- Time zone: UTC+09:00 (TLT)
- ISO 3166 code: TL-AN
- HDI (2017): 0.560 medium · 12th
- Website: Ainaro Municipality

Ainaro (Portuguese: Município Ainaro, Tetun: Munisípiu Ainaru) is one of 13 municipalities of Timor-Leste, in the southwest part of the country. It has a population of 59,175 (census 2010) and an area of 804 km^{2}. Its capital is the city of Ainaro, a small mountain town.

== Toponymy ==
The word Ainaro is derived from 'Ai Naruk', the local Mambai language expression for "tall tree", and refers to a species of tree that grows in the region. Ainaro is a Portuguese approximation of Ainaru, the Tetun derivation of the Mambai expression.

The traditional name of the region, 'Orluli', is still used today by Lian Nain during ceremonies, such as the sergala, to greet important guests.

== Geography ==
Ainaro has a great abundance of rivers and fertile terrain for agriculture. It has a coastal area, on the Timor Sea, but also mountainous zones, including the highest point in Timor-Leste, Mount Ramelau (2,960 m), also known as Tatamailau, which lies near the border with Ermera.

The borders of the municipality are identical to that of the same in Portuguese Timor, with the following exceptions: during the Indonesian occupation, the then subdistrict of Turiscai became part of Manufahi from Ainaro, and the then subdistrict of Hato-Udo became part of Ainaro in exchange. The then subdistrict of Mape-Zumalai became part of Cova Lima in 2003.

The municipality borders Aileu to the north, Manufahi to the south, Cova Lima to the southwest, Bobonaro to the west, and Ermera to the northwest.

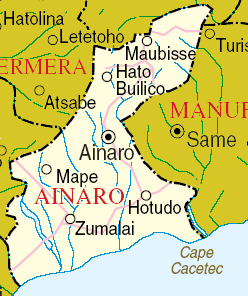
Borders of Ainaro before 2003

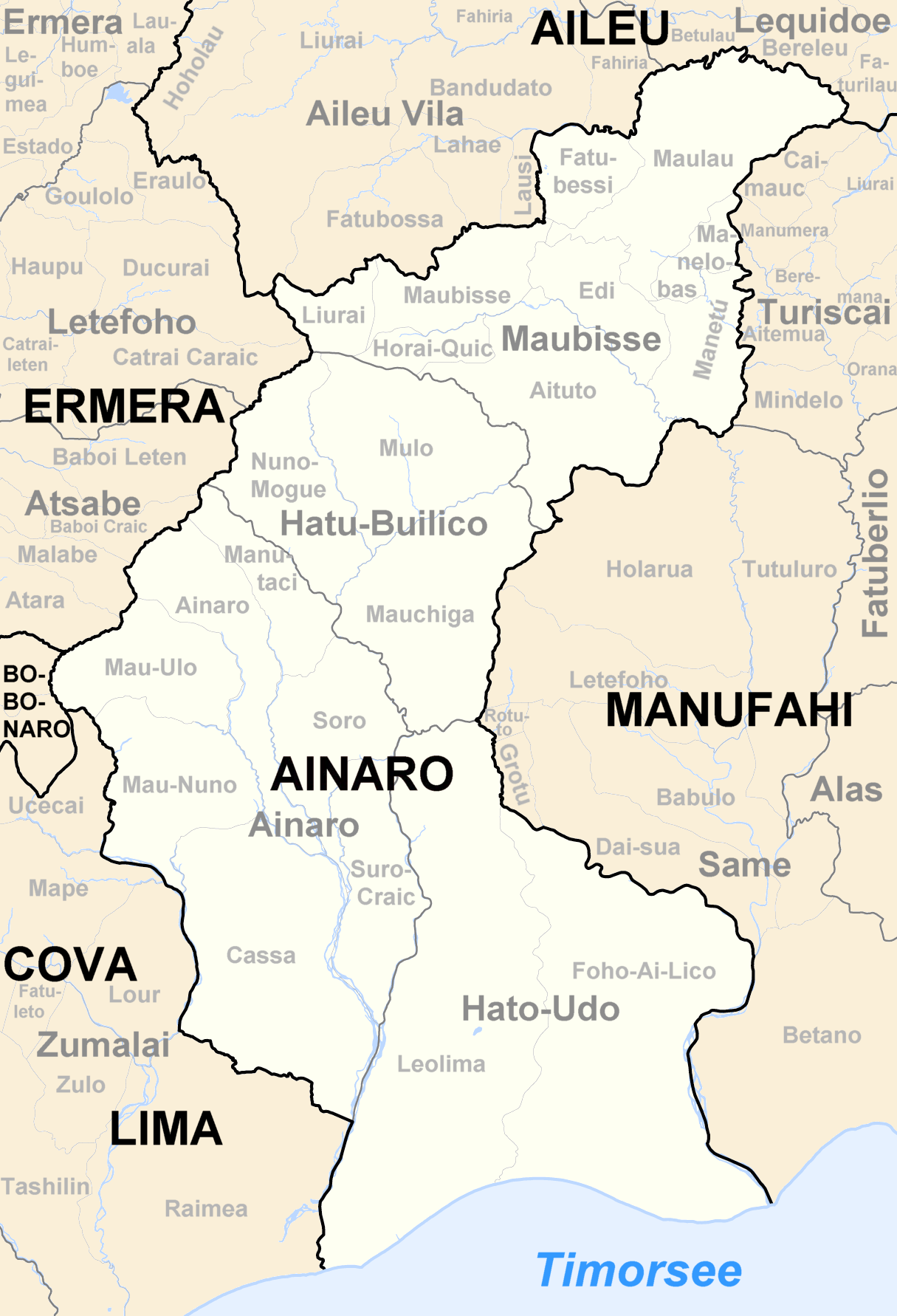
Borders of Ainaro after 2003

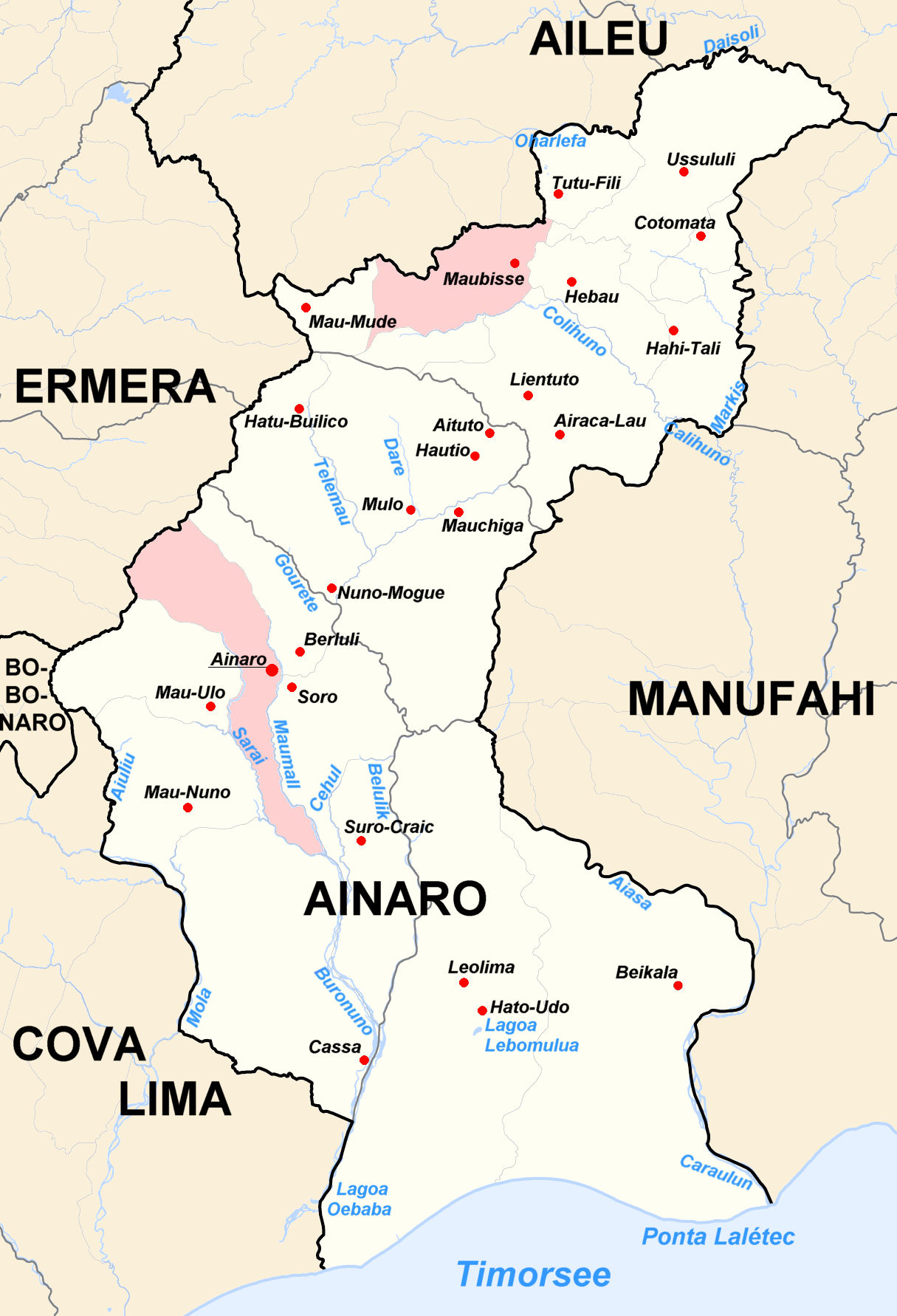
Cities and rivers of Ainaro

== History ==
Ainaro played an important role during the brutal Indonesian occupation of East Timor, providing shelter for the mountain-based guerrilla resistance army. Former guerrilla leader, former President, and current Prime Minister Xanana Gusmão spent many years directing the resistance from Ainaro.

== Administrative posts ==
The municipality's administrative posts (formerly sub-districts) are:

- Ainaro administrative post (place of capital Ainaro)
- Hato-Udo Administrative Post
- Hatu-Builico Administrative Post
- Maubisse Administrative Post

== Demographics ==
62.4% of the population speaks Mambai as mother tongue, 29.1% Tetun and 7.5% Bunak. 400 persons are speaking Kemac. 99.1% are Catholics, 0.9% protestants, 0.03% Muslim and only 19 persons are following still the traditional beliefs (census 2015).
