= Ainaro =

- City
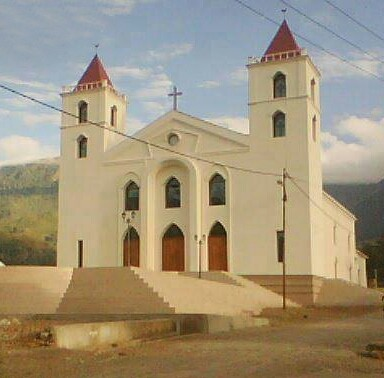

- Location in Timor-Leste
- Coordinates: 8°59′49″S 125°30′18″E
- Country: Timor-Leste
- Municipality: Ainaro
- Administrative post: Ainaro
- Elevation: 831 m (2,726 ft)
- Time zone: UTC+09:00 (TLT)
- Climate: Am

Ainaro is a city in Timor-Leste, the capital of the Ainaro suco, the Ainaro administrative post and the Ainaro Municipality, and is located in the southwest part of the country. The town of Ainaro is located 78 km south of Dili, the national capital.

== Destruction of Ainaro ==
During the Indonesian occupation from 1975 to 1999, Ainaro was home to a large contingent of Indonesian National Armed Forces (TNI)-backed pro-Indonesia militias in the months leading up to the 30 August 1999 referendum on independence. As a result, it suffered near-total devastation during the TNI-orchestrated scorched earth operation with more than 95 percent of its buildings destroyed.

== Climate ==
Ainaro's climate lies on the border between a tropical savanna climate (Köppen Aw) and a tropical monsoon climate (Am). Compared to Dili, Ainaro receives about two-and-a-half times more annual rainfall because it lies on the windward side of the southeastern trade winds, which especially during the first half of Dili's dry season give moisture to the southeastern side of Timor whilst the northern side is dry.

Climate data for Ainaro, East Timor (1928-1941)
Month	Jan	Feb	Mar	Apr	May	Jun	Jul	Aug	Sep	Oct	Nov	Dec	Year
Record high °C (°F)	31.1 (88.0)	31.1 (88.0)	33.3 (91.9)	30.0 (86.0)	33.3 (91.9)	29.0 (84.2)	30.0 (86.0)	30.0 (86.0)	30.0 (86.0)	32.2 (90.0)	33.3 (91.9)	32.2 (90.0)	33.3 (91.9)
Mean daily maximum °C (°F)	27.0 (80.6)	26.7 (80.1)	26.5 (79.7)	25.7 (78.3)	25.6 (78.1)	24.3 (75.7)	23.9 (75.0)	25.1 (77.2)	26.5 (79.7)	26.9 (80.4)	27.8 (82.0)	27.9 (82.2)	26.1 (79.0)
Daily mean °C (°F)	22.7 (72.9)	22.5 (72.5)	22.6 (72.7)	21.7 (71.1)	21.5 (70.7)	20.5 (68.9)	19.7 (67.5)	20.1 (68.2)	21.4 (70.5)	21.9 (71.4)	22.6 (72.7)	22.9 (73.2)	21.7 (71.0)
Mean daily minimum °C (°F)	18.4 (65.1)	18.4 (65.1)	18.7 (65.7)	17.7 (63.9)	17.4 (63.3)	16.8 (62.2)	15.4 (59.7)	15.1 (59.2)	16.4 (61.5)	17.0 (62.6)	17.5 (63.5)	17.8 (64.0)	17.2 (63.0)
Record low °C (°F)	14.4 (57.9)	13.3 (55.9)	15.5 (59.9)	13.3 (55.9)	10.0 (50.0)	10.0 (50.0)	10.0 (50.0)	9.9 (49.8)	10.0 (50.0)	10.0 (50.0)	10.0 (50.0)	12.2 (54.0)	9.9 (49.8)
Average rainfall mm (inches)	341.5 (13.44)	337.6 (13.29)	338.7 (13.33)	202.1 (7.96)	166.7 (6.56)	92.6 (3.65)	47.6 (1.87)	6.3 (0.25)	26.8 (1.06)	94.8 (3.73)	217.8 (8.57)	454.5 (17.89)	2,326.8 (91.61)
Average rainy days	17.9	16.3	18.7	12.6	11.5	9.8	7.9	2.3	1.5	4.0	9.8	17.7	129.8
Source: NOAA

== Sister cities ==
- Madison, United States
- Ballarat, Australia
