= Babulo, Uato-Lari =

Settlement in Timor-Leste

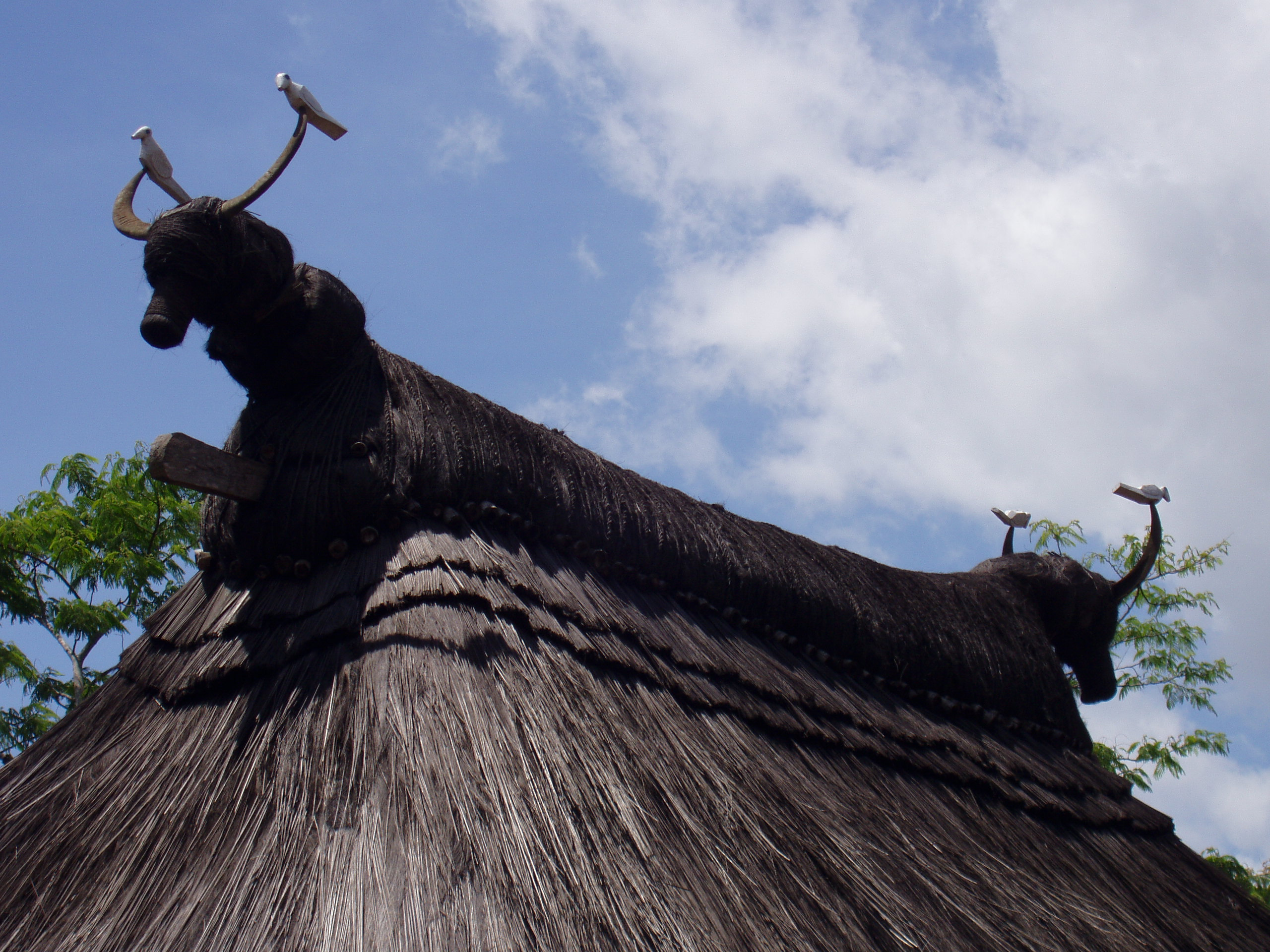
Uma Lulim in Babulo

Babulo (Babolu) is a settlement in Timor-Leste and a suco (or village) in the Uato-Lari Administrative Post, Viqueque Municipality. The suco is one of the ethnic centers of the Naueti, and is also inhabited by the Makasae, an ethnic minority in the region. The different groups and clans are tightly connected through an ancient social structure which still has impact on their society today.

== Geography ==
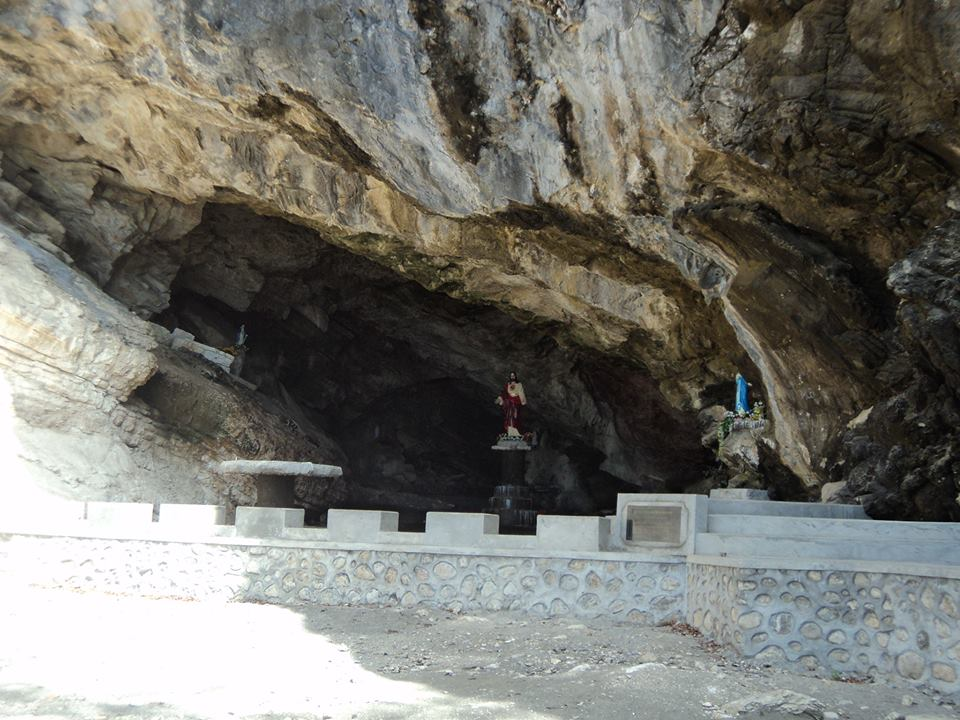
Grotto of Didimera

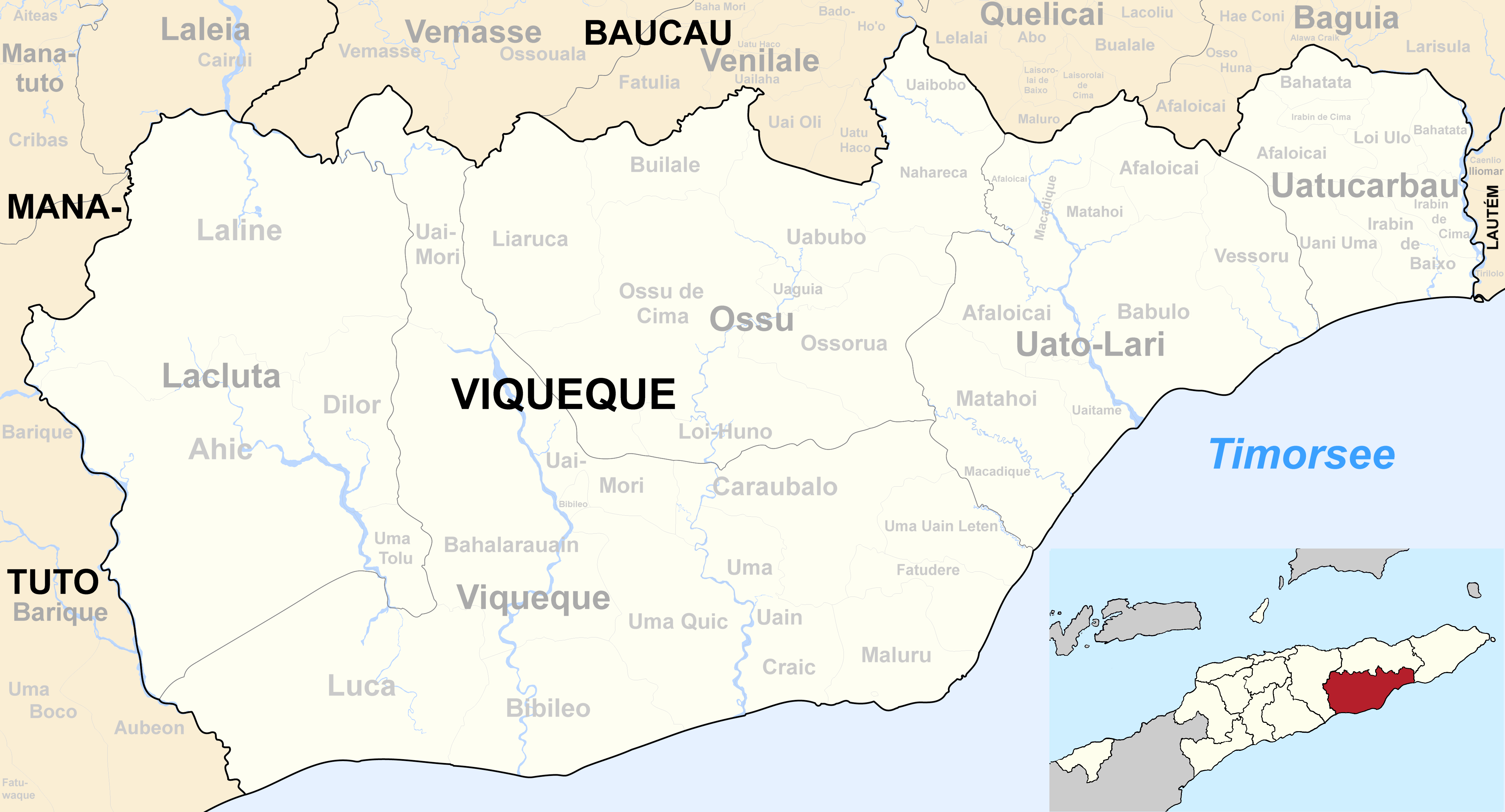
Map of Viqueque Municipality

Babulo is situated on the eastern side of the administrative post of Uato-Lari. Babulo borders on the Afaloicai territory to the north, Vessor to the east and the Timor Sea to the south; to the west and northwest, the rivers Bebui and Roliu separate it from the neighbouring sucos of Uaitame, Afaloicai and Matahoi. The Metauai river, which forms the border between the sucos to the northeast, flows into the Timor Sea through Vessoru as the Oiqui. The Borouai, witch has its source in Babulo, flows further south and forms an estuary at the river border with Vessoru in the east.

Before the reforms in 2015, Babulo had a total surface area of 79.71 km^{2}. Currently it measures 70.52 km^{2}. Areas located north of Uai Cai were handed over to the Afalpicai suco, and the border in the north was shifted from the eastern suco of Vessoru further east to the river Metauai. A river island in the Bebui was given to Afaloicai and the whole delta region of Uaitame was given to Babulo.

The community of Babulo is located in the southwest of the suco, at 578 m above sea level. Babulo and the town of Afaloicai (Aflocai) form a single settlement. They have a primary school, Escola Primaria No. 7 Afalocai, and a medical station.

The southern coastal road is one of the most important roads in East Timor, crossing the Bebui in the village of Borolalo (Burlalu). From here, the road hugs the coast until it leaves the suco, now crossing the Borouai and sweeping to the east. The villages of Daralari (Daralare), Aliambata and Kampung Baru lie on the south-west section of the road, Cucodere in the south-east, Uato-Lari (Uato-Lari Leten, "Ober"-Uato-Lari) in the centre, and Uai Cai in the north. The mountain Didimera can be found to the north of Aliambata, in the eastern area of the suco. Here there is a cave looking out over the sea, wherr there is an altar with a statue of Jesus and other Christian saints. The southern coastal road passes through the suco 2 kilometres from Didimera. Along the road, near the village of Aliambata, are a feature known as the "eternal flames", which are fed by natural gas escaping from deep underground rock formations.

The mountain Babulo (670m) lies to the south of the village which shares its name. Baha Liurai, the suco's holy mountain, lies to the north-east of the village of Babulo. The settlement of Uatosoba can be found on its western slopes, where the Suco's primary holy house is situated. This area is part of aldeia Daralari. The settlement of Aha B Uu lies to the north-east of the Baha Liurai, Borulaisoba to the east, and the animistic burial ground of Nahasaka to the south-east.

The eight aldeias ("communities") are Abadere, Aha B Uu (Ahabu′u, Aha Bu′u), Asa Muta (Asamuta), Beli, Cota Nisi (Kotanisi, manchmal Kaidu), Daralari (Darlari), Lia Sidi (Liasidi) und Roma.

== Inhabitants and culture ==
=== Overview ===
Anthropologist Susana Barnes studied the culture and traditions of the residents of Babulo for several years, keeping a record of the interaction between the different clans and their respective ceremonial duties. The following account is based primarily on her paper Origins, Precedence and Social Order in the Domain of Ina Ama Beli Darlari, published in 2011.

As of 2015, the suco of Babulo has a population of 2,187, 1,113 of whom are men and 1,074 women. The population density is 31 residents per km^{2}. There are 455 private homes in the entire suco. Nearly 97% of all residents claim Naueti to be their native language. Just under 2% speak Makasae, a few Tetum Prasa, Tetum Terik, Makalero, Fataluku and Waimaha. The Makasae-speaking section of the population stood at 24% before the local government reform. The literacy rate among people aged 15 to 24 is 88.32 per cent, outranking the national average as well as the average of the community of Viqueque. Expanding the age bracket to encompass all people aged 15 and over results in a significantly lower rate, with only 57.2 per cent able to read and write, which is still higher than that of the community of Viqueque (55.9 per cent). 40.83 per cent of the population is under the age of 15 (national average: 39.09 per cent), whereas 15.09 per cent are 60 or over (8.19 per cent).

The origin of the aldeias' unification into the Babulo suco is unknown. The aldeias are still formed by clans, whose members are closely related to each other. Neither immigration during the later period of colonialization nor the transmigration of Indonesians has destroyed this social structure. The center of each aldeia is a house of worship (Uma Luli), which used to be located at the center of the baha. Babulo's inhabitants lived in these highland settlements before the Indonesian invasion in 1975. The inhabitants were traditionally men who were related to each other through the paternal line, along with their wives and children.

The clans are in turn divided into lineages and sub-lineages (Uma kain), each having its own cult house. The relationship between the individual members of the lineages is described as "older" (kaka) or "younger" (wari). The "older" houses are closer to the ancestors, and thus rank higher than the "younger" houses. Each cult house served a purpose within the rituals and social establishment of the clan.

The oldest man of the "oldest" house of every line of descent is called the Na'i (Tetum for „Master“) or Bu Dato (Grandfather-Lord). They are considered direct descendants of their ancestors. The "oldest" houses of the clans traditionally come from the Aldeia chieftains, who are usually sons or nephews of one of the elders. Marriages, alliances and relationships connect the Aldeia line of ancestry to the foremost house. Marriages are supposed to take place beyond their own line of ancestry to form close relationships between the "giver of the bride" (uma ana) and the "taker of the bride" (oa sae). However, people are married within the same line of descent or with other close relatives, although this is disapproved of. Furthermore, the Naueti society is divided into Liurai (aristocrats, where the most powerful ruler is also called the Liurai), Reinu, or Ata (slaves). The Ata are descendants of former slaves and prisoners of war. Traditionally, marriages between the three classes are forbidden.

Resettlements during the Indonesian occupation has resulted in half of the population having their ancestral roots in the neighbouring suco of Afaloicai. They form their own aldeias and do not consider themselves subordinate to the old and traditional Liurai. They are still tied to their native land through their culture, but draw a distinction between their current and their former home. Afaloicai and Babulo have a long and common history of social relations, such as marriages for the sake of political alliances. Nonetheless, the inhabitants of Afaloicai are still oftentimes considered immigrants with less claim to the land and other natural resources.

Many traditional leaders have complained that numerous inhabitants of the suco, even some members of the foremost clans, are neglecting old rituals previously followed to ensure the fertility of the soil. Additionally, only a small number of people remain who are aware of the history of the suco and their ancestors' incantations. Immigrants, on the other hand, bring their own venerated traditions and ancestors. The elders of Babulo describe this situation as "chaotic", which has resulted in many problems and anxieties since the withdrawal of the Portuguese.

=== Traditional Faith ===
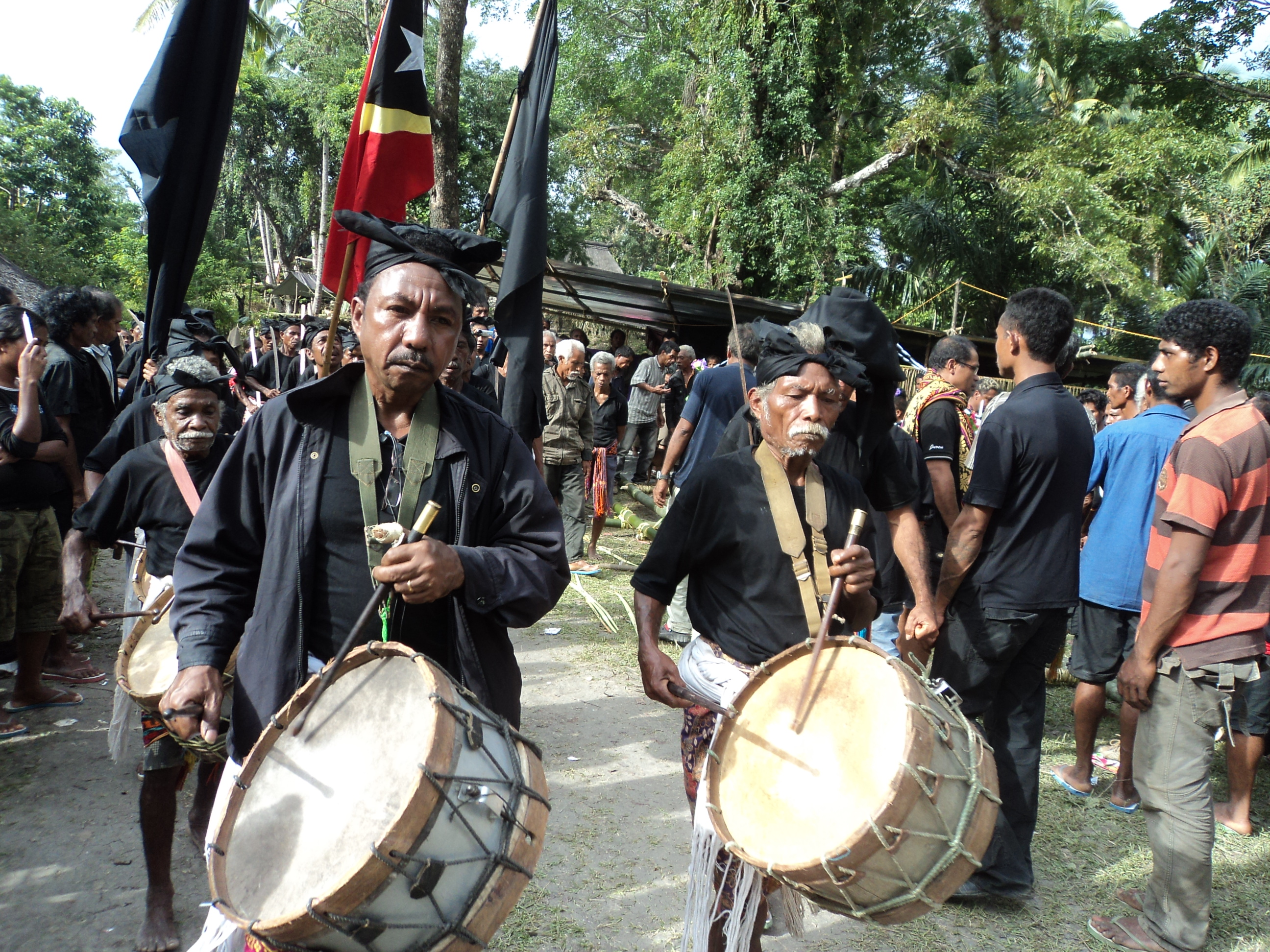
Funeral of the Liurai of Babulo (2012)

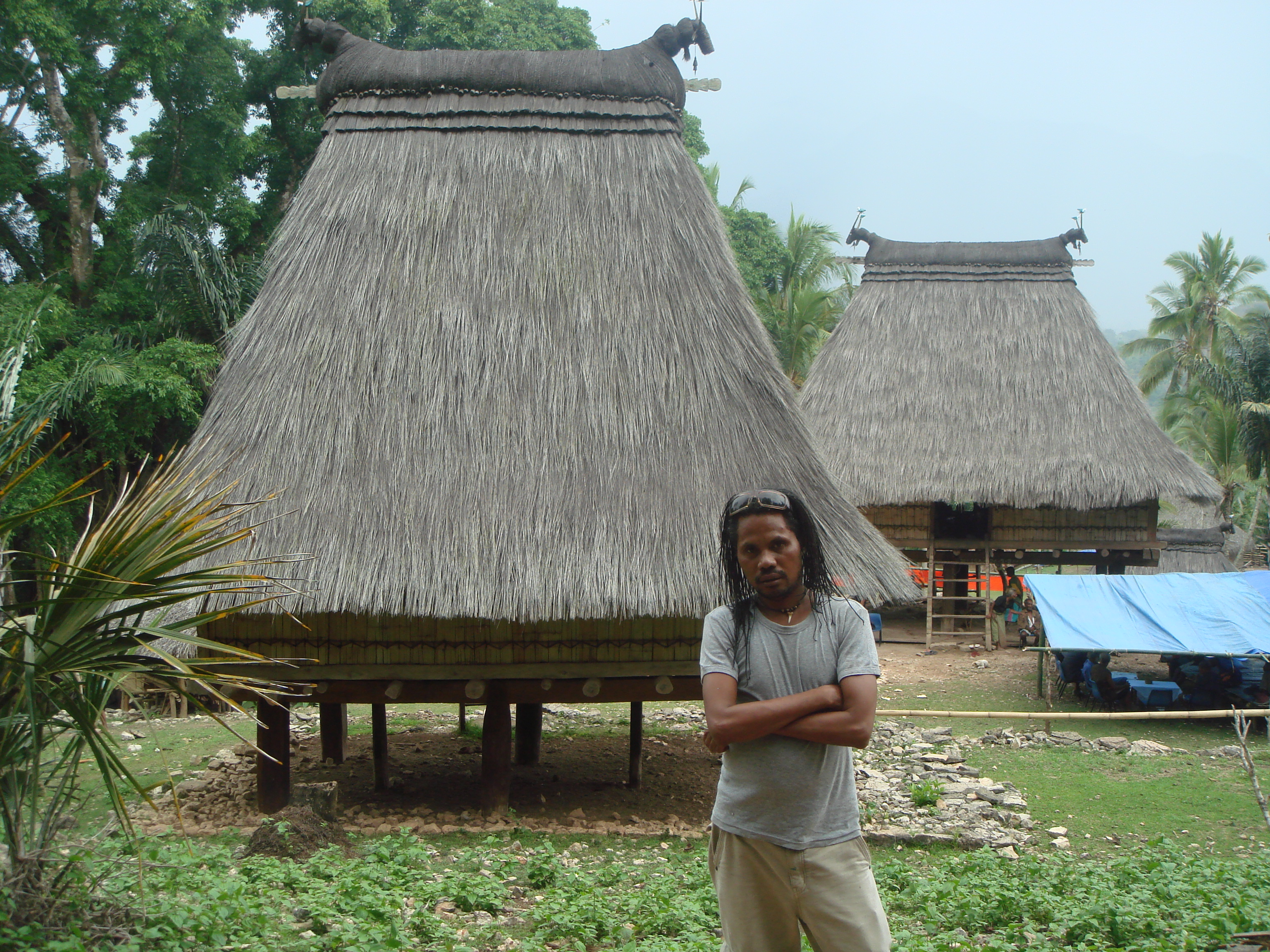
The Sacred House in Borulaisoba, the most important of the Aldeia Aha B Uu

The majority of the inhabitants of Babulo officially follow the Catholic religion, as is the case in the rest of East Timor. In the whole commune of Viqueque, only 52 inhabitants professed to following the traditional faith of Timor, a form of animism worshipping natural spirits and ancestors.

Nevertheless, the traditional religion still has a deep impact, although it is emphasised that even before the arrival of the Catholic missionaries, there had never been a worship of "rock and tree" (uato no kai) but of the God of Creation Wula′ Lara (known also as Ulu Lara). In the faith of Timor, this god created the world and placed chosen people on Earth in order to control (ei) and tame (masi) the land. A long time before these Chosen Ones arrived, people lived without rules and regulations (ikutame, garteme). From the time the Chosen Ones took over control of the land, behavioural norms and practices for a social and moral order were established. The descendants of the Chosen Ones, the Clan of the Daralari, have the duty to uphold this order by the continuation of the holy (luli) norms and practices. They influence the interplay of the clans and houses and define the rituals and social life.

The rules that are associated with the founding fathers are the most holy. Within the occupation of the land they were responsible for the naming of the hills, rocks, rivers, springs, forests and fields, and began to use nature and its resources. This created the basis of the relationship with the bu′u, the original owners of the land or so-called guardians, who occupied Earth. The belief in the invisible earth that is occupied by the bu′u in various forms is still widespread today. The most powerful amongst those in the faith are the independent and untamed "owners" (of the land and the natural resources), who can assume the shape of a human or an animal. They rule over processes of nature and are able to influence the relationships between the people and the land. If people do not respect the luli order and prohibitions, negative consequences, for example, illnesses and even death might result in the imaginations of many inhabitants. To avoid this, one needs the help of the eldest to appease the bu′u. In order to please the bu′u and to gain access to the natural resources, the inhabitants of Babulo "follow in the footprints" of the ancestors with special rituals, incantations and sacrifices. The spirits of the ancestors have also become part of nature. Places where they are believed to assemble are considered sacred. The deeds of some of the ancestors are recounted in local legends. They were partly connected with great sacrifices, and even death. Some of these deeds include the first harvest, the protection of the borders and the preservation of the land from natural disasters. The relationship between the living and the ancestors is reciprocal. There are rituals involving the whole community and the individual clans throughout the year that include incantations and sacrifices to the ancestors.

The masi eka rae rea ena ("washing of the corn leaves") ceremony is held in small groups in the fields just before the beginning of the harvest. It is held to ask the Owner of the Field (rea bu'u) to watch over the harvest. The ritual transforms the corn from ba'ina (forbidden and sour) to masi (tamed, edible and sweet). It is believed that rea bu'u can take the form of mice, insects, plant parasites and diseases, and destroy the crops. The ceremony involves other bu'u, who, as ancestors, were the first to farm the land. Eggs, rice, and meat form part of the sacrifice, which is laid on the edges and in the center of the field. The rest is shared among those present at the ceremony. Occasionally clothing and Tais are sacrificed, as the spirits and ancestors share the same human needs as the mortals.

=== Beli and Daralari ===
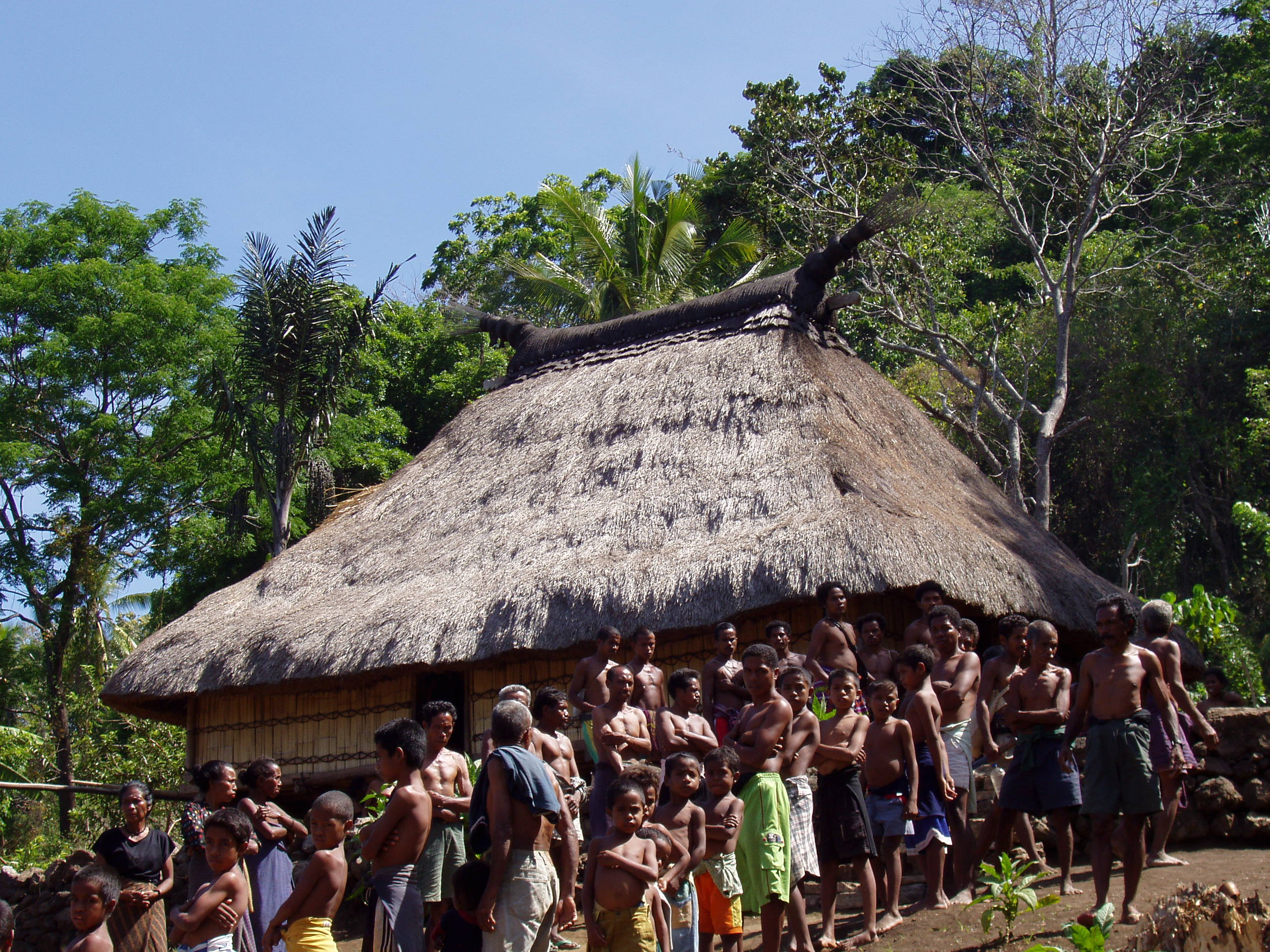
Uatosoba, the most sacred house in the Suco. It belongs to the Daralari Aldeia.

The highest spiritual and ritual authority is formed by the elders of the Daralari. According to them, the Daralari used to hold the secular power but willingly gave it away to the other clans in order to "pass over into the dark". It is said that they did this in order to protect the secrets of their land from "the outsiders", namely the colonialists and the Catholic Church. Extended family members and immigrant groups were also integrated into their social structures, thus preventing any revolt against the powers that be. By passing over into the Spiritual Power, one stands "above all things" and has the authority over the secular power.

The elders of the Daralari know the spiritual secrets. They know the history of their ancestors' arrival and of the first settlement, the founding of the local houses and the arrival of the later groups. They know the conflicts, alliances, treaties, and oaths (juramento) between the Suco and its neighbours. They also know the ancient rights of land use and the territorial boundaries. However, the most important knowledge is the names of spirits and guardians who control the access to forests, fields, and water. Access to this knowledge is limited to only a select few.

The "oldest" houses of Beli and Daralari can be traced back to two brothers, whose direct lineage derives from the mythical Founder of the ancient Realm of Bubulu. According to the stories of the Daralari people, the mythical ancestors came from the sea and took over "the entire land, touched by the Sun". The ancestral names of both Aldeias' lineages are held sacred and therefore must not be spoken out loud. They derived from the origin of the houses and are kept secret from outsiders. The names of modern Aldeias are used in everyday life and during local ceremonies. The ruling houses of Daralari are also called Uma Buti (white house) and Uma Ita (black house). The associated shrines were rebuilt in 2000, once the Indonesian occupation had ended. Although the Uma Buti shrine is owned by the Daralari, it belongs to the entire community of the Suco. Uma Ita, the lower-ranked shrine, is referred to as the ruling house, where the traditional symbols of the Daralari political power (rotan) were kept to be later distributed to subordinate houses. Both shrines keep sacred looms, which once belonged to the legendary ancestors. It is believed that the looms carry the essence of the ancestors, and that the ancestors themselves live within certain parts of the shrines. During ceremonies, food, water, betel nuts (bua), betel leaves (malu) and other offerings are deposited in these sacred locations, and are later distributed back to the community. The nuts and leaves are said to have special protective powers. During community ceremonies and healing rituals, they serve as a symbol for community members and as protection for outsiders. Beli has only one main house, simply referred to as Um Luli (sacred house). According to the local legend (Naueti: tete bo'ona, literally the oldest story) the brothers are said to have lived near the Baha Liurai (The Hill of the Ruler). However, the brothers started fighting, as the elder Beli was said to have abandoned his duties, much to the younger Daralari's dismay. Thus the elder brother lost his privileges and had to abandon the Sacred Land, while Daralari rose to be the leading lineage of the Ancestors.

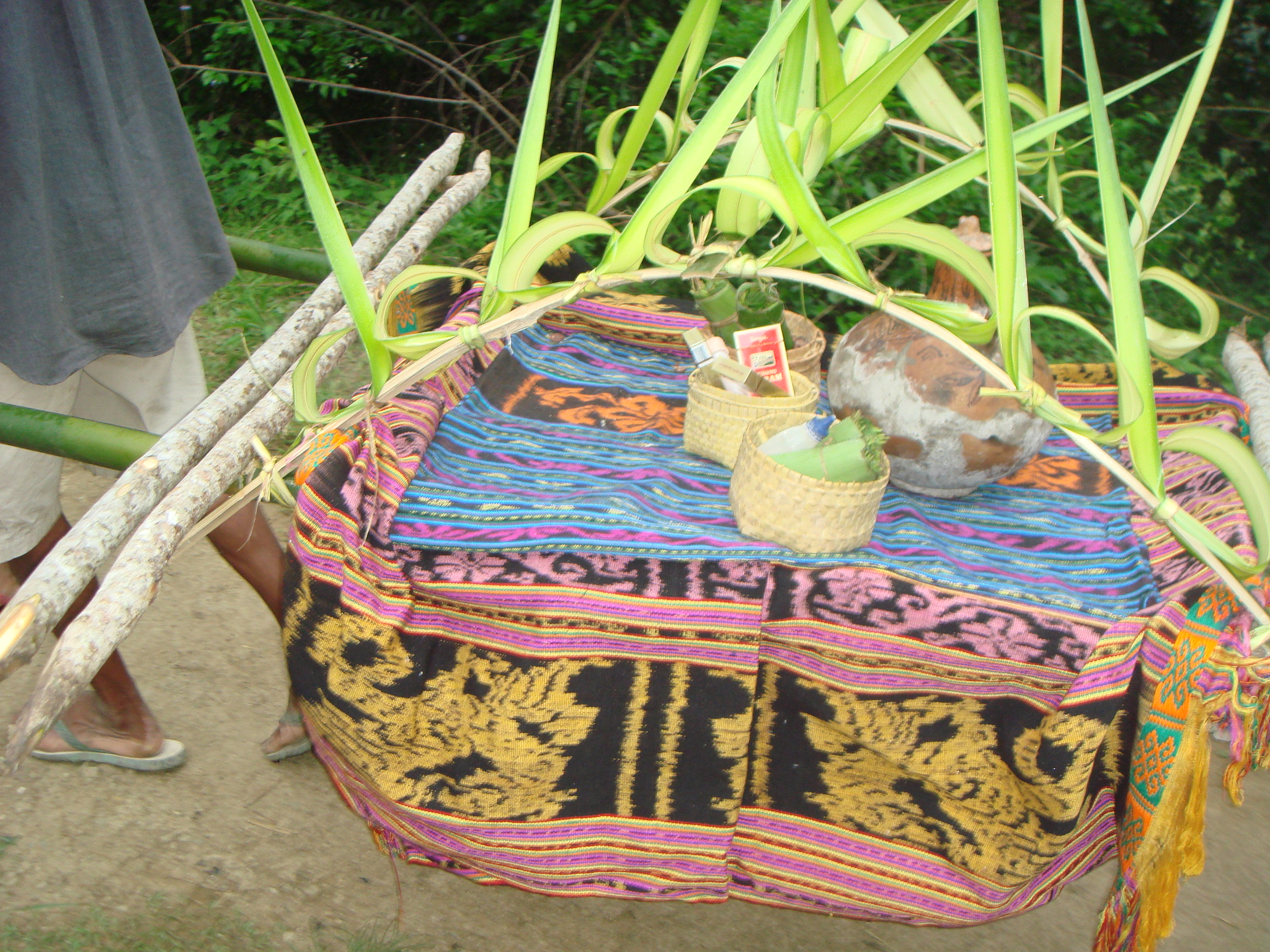
Wai Malu (water and betel nut) - a gift from the giver of the bride's (or the giver of life) family to the family who receives the bride during the inauguration of a sacred house. It symbolizes the blessing of the giver of the bride.

The leading houses of the Aldeia still refer to each other as "older" (kaka) and "younger" (wari), and see themselves as brothers, whereas the other inhabitants of the "land of the ancestors" who joined the Aldeia through marriage and other alliances are called Ina Ama Beli Daralari (mother father Beli Daralari). The leading lineage is given the title rea bu′u (Lord of the Land/Owner of the Land) in order to honour their position as seniors. Other names used in the formal and ritual language are "Ruler of the Land" and "Rock of the Land". Nowadays, the "Lord of the Land" is personified by the Bu Dato, the leader of the Daralari clan. He is supported by two other elders from the Daralari. He "sits and watches" over the sanctuaries of the ancestors in the main cult houses of the Daralari, the white house and the black house.

The "Lord of the Land" is the supreme servant of the land of the ancestors. The elders of the Daralari emphasise that the former borders of their territory reached further than those of the Suco. It was only during colonialism that the region was narrowed down to the benefit of allies of Portugal. The Daralari belong to the original territory in the north and north east. Its inhabitants are called ki butana (people of the white children) and ki itana (people of the black children). These groups can roughly be put on the same level as the leading lineages of Lia Sidi (ki itana) and Balabasiba, Aldeias in the Suco Vessuro (ki butana). They are connected to the Daralari through marriage. According to local legends, the realm of Builo (nowadays an Aldeia in Ossorua) in the northwest is considered a rival of Babulo. At one time the Daralari fought an intense and brutal battle against them about drawing the borderlines between the two powers. The Portuguese colonial masters are said to have appointed a descendant of the realm of Luca as the superior ruler of Uaitame and Vessoru to mediate between the opponents. The regions along the coastal plains situated west and east of the region of Daralari and Beli are nowadays dominated by descendants of immigrants from Luca. In the southwest the territorial claims of Daralari include the region of the Lugassa river, although the people are very cautious about making public claims in order to uphold the peace in the region. According to Babulo, the Naueti speakers in Beaco (Suco Maluru) are descendants of that place. Their ancestors were brought to the coast as prisoners of war, exchanged for firearms.

Nowadays, the land of the Daralari is shared among its five most powerful houses. Rivers, hills and rocks mark the boundaries. These territories are not interconnected, but mirror the traditional shifting land cultivation. Access to these territories is passed on from the founding ancestors to their direct descendants. In order to continue using the land, members of the houses have to keep their ritualistic and communal duties up. Otherwise, they risk provoking the wrath of the ancestors, which may bring misfortune, sickness or even death. By "passing over into the dark" the Daralari transferred the task of land cultivation as well as watching over natural resources (lai bosa, lai wai) to a subordinate house (um kain) of Daralari, the Uma kabo. At a later date, a Kabo Rai, a primary representative of the Uma kabo, asked the Bu Dato for a symbol of his power. In response, a Makaer Luli, an expert in rituals, was placed at his side. In addition to supervising land and water usage, the Kabo Rai also enforces seasonal harvesting restrictions on certain products, exacts tributes for community ceremonies, and imposes penalties for ignoring the rules. When implementing these tasks, he is assisted by representatives of two other subordinate houses of the Daralari: Asu Rati Reino and Asu Rati Liurai. The Makaer Luli accompanies the tasks spiritually. Not only is he the leader in community rituals, but also an intermediary capable of communicating with the spiritual realm, as well as a guardian of sacred relics kept in the sacred house, the Uma luli of Borolalo. This is the place where the ancestors are said to have settled first after their arrival from the sea.

=== Aha B Uu and Cota Nisi ===
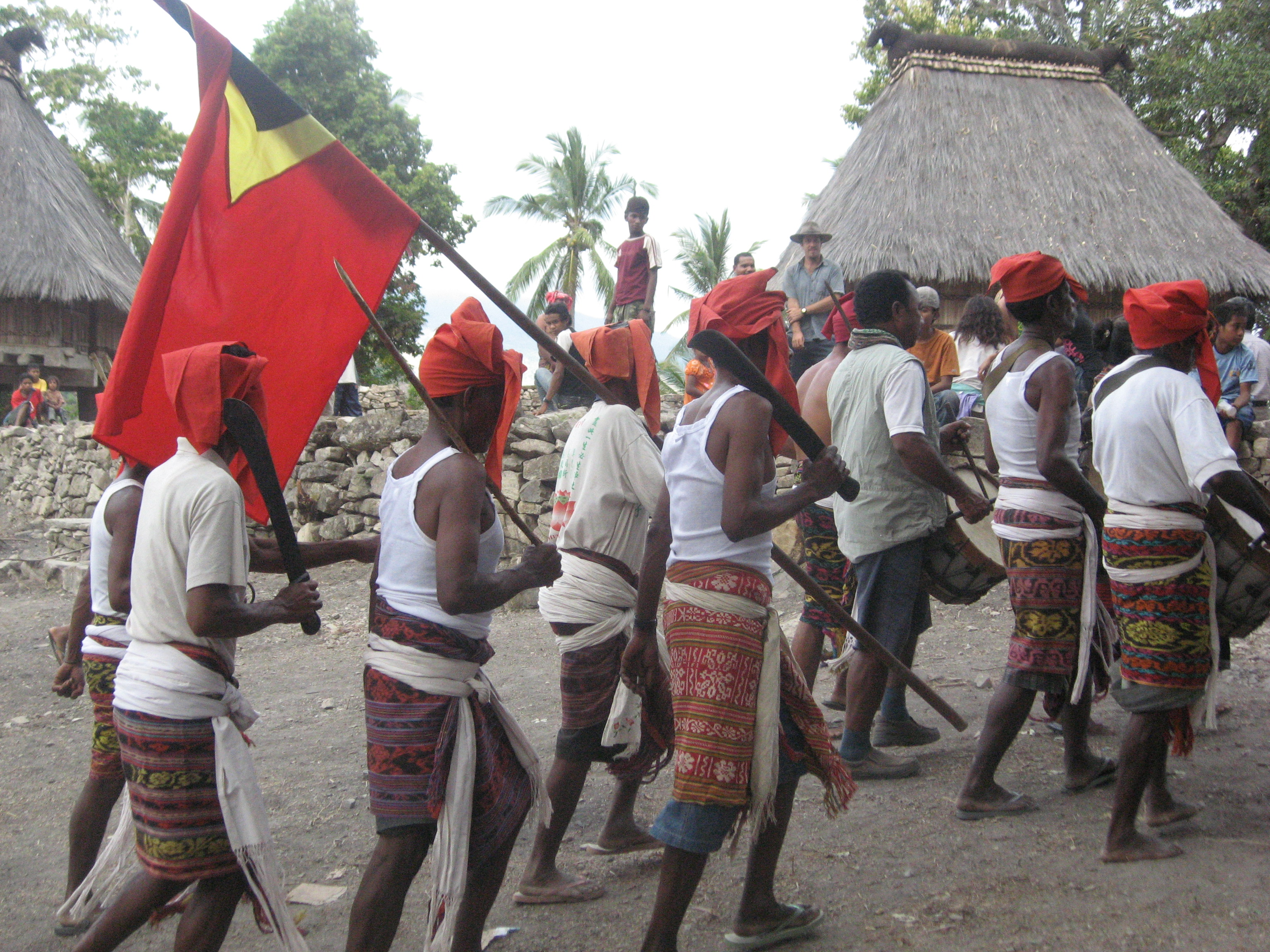
Inauguration of the holy house of Ahabu'u

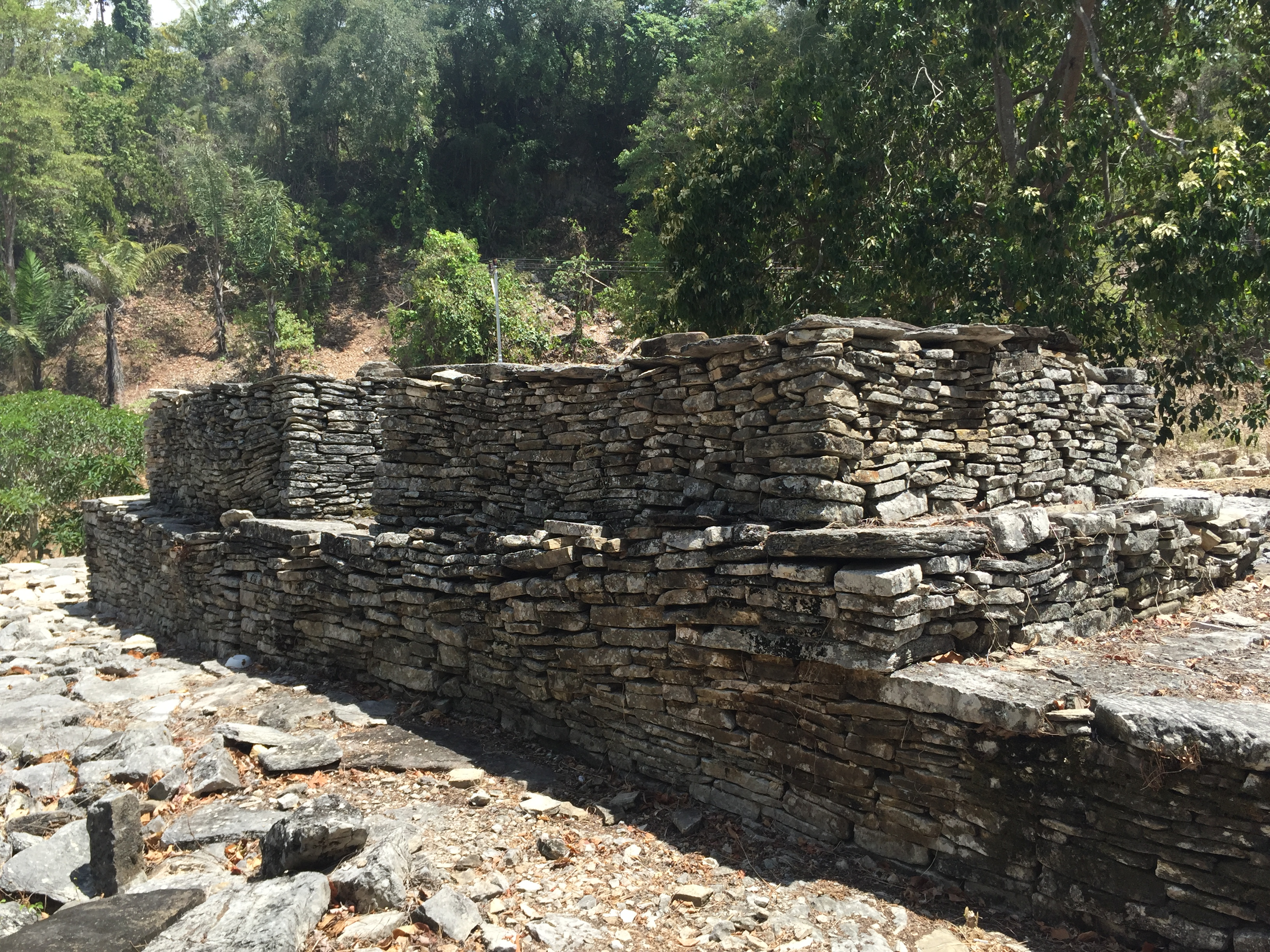
The animistic gravesite in Nahasaka

The secular leader of the Babulo (Liurai) traditionally originates from either the Aha B Uu or Cota Nisi Aldeias. They represent two lines of the same lineage, called Burmeta, whose patriarchal ancestor is said to have been a man named Boru Buti. The name Burmeta derives from the name of the Matebian in Makasae, where the mountain Bere Meta is also referred to as "The Great Black Man". According to Daralari lore, the Burmeta are descendants of warriors (asuwain), who arrived in Babulo eight generations previously from the region east of the Matebian, though this claim is debatable. Some sources claim that they had been banished from their ancestral land. The Burmeta are said to have gained their current leadership in the region through their military power and strategic marriages. According to the Daralari, the Burmeta once camped on the Baha Liurai on their way west to become the vassals of the Luca Empire. In order to forestall the alliance with the powerful neighbour, the Daralari are said to have offered to settle in the Burmeta land, for which they would take over defence of the borders (lai reinu, lai rea, "protect the people, protect the land"). The Daralari gave them the title ana bo'ona, ana tadana (the oldest and wisest son). Another name known to have been used was ita mata, kai hene ("doors and gates"), Guardian of the Gate. The Burmeta trace their leadership claim (ukun, "to lead/to reign") from a staff (rota), which they received from the ruler of the Viqueque. Aha B Uu, the most important sacred house, is located in Borulaisoba. A Makaer Luli ("Guardian of the Saints") watches over the house. This is where the regalia and other sacred objects are kept. When Babulo came under Portugal's reign, the leader of the Burmeta, as the ruler of the area, was awarded the military title of Lieutenant Colonel (Portuguese: Tenente Colonel). Since then, the village chiefs (Chefe de Suco) have come from the ranks of the Burmeta. Under the Portuguese colonial administration, he was the link to the local population. He was responsible for local disputes, tax collection, and recruitment of a labor force. Nowadays the Chefe de Suco is an elected office.

=== Roma ===
The Aldeia Roma is often called "Aldeia without land". It was founded after the independence of East Timor and consists mainly of the Makasae. The majority of their relatives (Laka Roma) are said to be descendants of slaves (Ata) who came from Quelicai and spoke Makasae. In the meantime, the Laka Roma themselves speak Naueti, having integrated with the indigenous population. According to legend, the Laka Roma were originally servants of a Liurai of the Burmeta, who was in exile in Quelicai. When his family called him back home and made him the ruler, he brought along his followers, who latched onto him like "seeds of long grass". This is the meaning of laka roma in Makasae. In the past, they served the ruling families of Aha B Uu, Cota Nisi and Daralari. They first herded the water buffalos of their masters and later started to cultivate the land that was situated near the pastures of the buffalos.

=== Immigrants from Afaloicai ===
The most recent group of immigrants comes from neighbouring Afaloicai and arrived in Babulo in three successive waves. The oldest group from the Aldeias Buibela and Lena entered the Suco in the 1930s in the hope of finding land. It is highly likely that these were refugees of the conflict over the fall of the Afaloicai empire. According to local records, Liurai Gregorio from Lena reached Babulo just before the arrival of the Japanese (1942, cf. Battle of Timor). He arrived in Babulo sounding fanfares, drums and flutes and set up camp on sacred land (rea luli) near Baha Liurai. Shortly thereafter a sickness spread among the newcomers, which can be traced back to this breach of taboo. So Gregorio asked the Daralari for permission to settle within their Suco. Marriage consolidated this newly formed alliance and Gregorio, the new son-in-law, was permitted to enter a place known as Tua Rae Laleo ("shelter of palm wine leaves"). He and his people received farming land in the vicinity of Uato-Lari Leten and Kampung Baru. . As oa sae (giver of the bride) the family of Gregorio pledged to provide the Daralari with goods and services. But the Daralari point out that while Gregorio and his family merely have the rights to use the land, it is in fact still controlled by the "Lord of the Land". After World War II the Portuguese pursued a policy of agricultural development in their colony. They ordered the village chiefs to organise teams to farm the land for the colonial government. As a result, a second wave of immigrants from Afaloicai and the area surrounding Mt. Matebian arrived in the Suco in the 1950s and 1960s, initially working as seasonal labourers on the rice fields constructed on the coastal plains of Uato-Lari. They too eventually settled permanently in the area. Many of them benefited from the family bonds they shared with those immigrants who had arrived and settled there earlier. The third wave of immigrants was forcefully relocated to Babulo by the Indonesians after the resistance base on the slopes of the Matebian was destroyed in 1979, forcing many civilians to submit to the invaders. In contrast to Burmeta and Laka Roma these new immigrants are not familiar with, or embedded in, traditional community structures. Instead they continue their own distinct hierarchies and clans. They are still frequently perceived as temporary co-inhabitants by the native population, as well as labelled "people using the land for agricultural and gardening purposes" at ceremonies and rituals.

=== Baha Liurai Festival ===
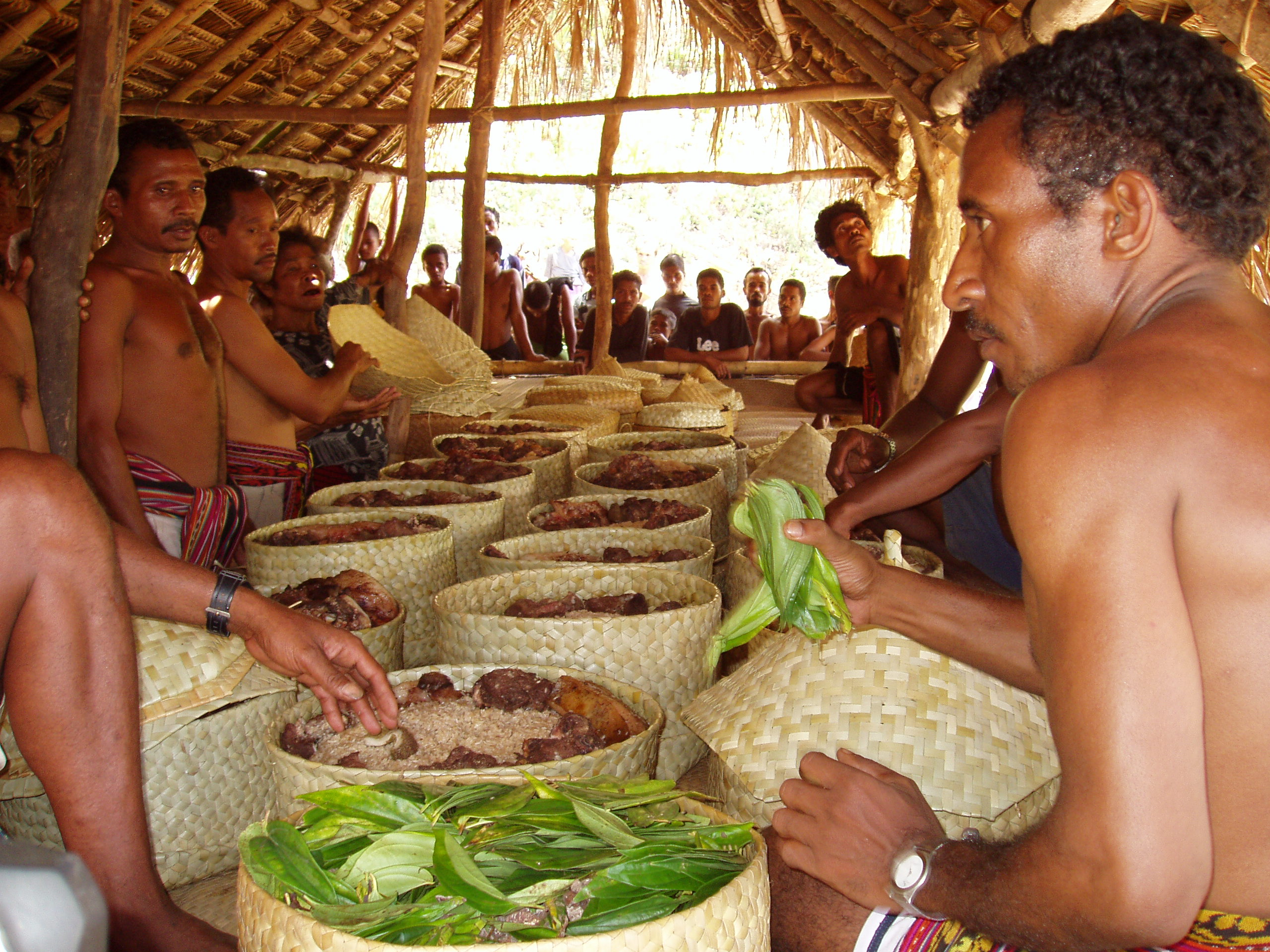
Back in the village with the sacrifices of the Baha Liurai Festival

Every seven to fifteen years, the Baha Liurai Festival of the Naueti takes place in Babulo on the eponymous "Sacred Hill" of the region. The festival has not taken place since 1974 because such animistic ceremonies were prohibited by the Indonesian occupation (1975-1999). The first Baha Liurai Festival after the occupation took place in November 2003. Another festival followed in 2015. The next festival is planned for 2025.

== History ==
When dealing with trans-regional conflicts, the complex system of clan alliances repeatedly lead to partisan fronts running between clans of the Suco and the entire administrative post of Uato-Lari. Thus the descendants of the Burmeta regard the ruling family of Afoloicai, the so-called Buibela/Lena, as their "younger siblings". Some members of the ruling house, for example, benefited greatly from the Indonesian occupation (1975-1999), jumpstarting their political and economic careers on a local and national level. Some of them even took part in the Viqueque rebellion. Due to repeated eruptions of internal conflicts Uato-Lari is considered a trouble spot.

The last major insurrection against Portuguese colonial power was staged in 1959. This uprising even included the rulers of the Burmeta. After the insurrection had been suppressed, many Naueti lost their estate and cattle, which the Portuguese handed over to loyal Timorese, mostly Makasae. Supporters of the Timorese Democratic Union defeated by Fretilin during the civil war in August 1975 later became collaborators working with the Indonesians and saw their chance for revenge.

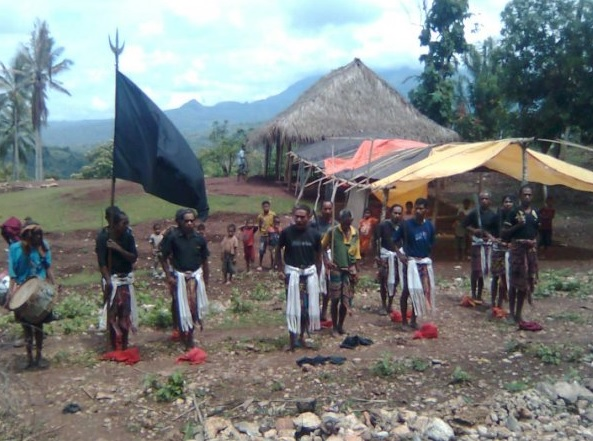
Funeral of the housekeeper of the sacred house of Aha B Uu

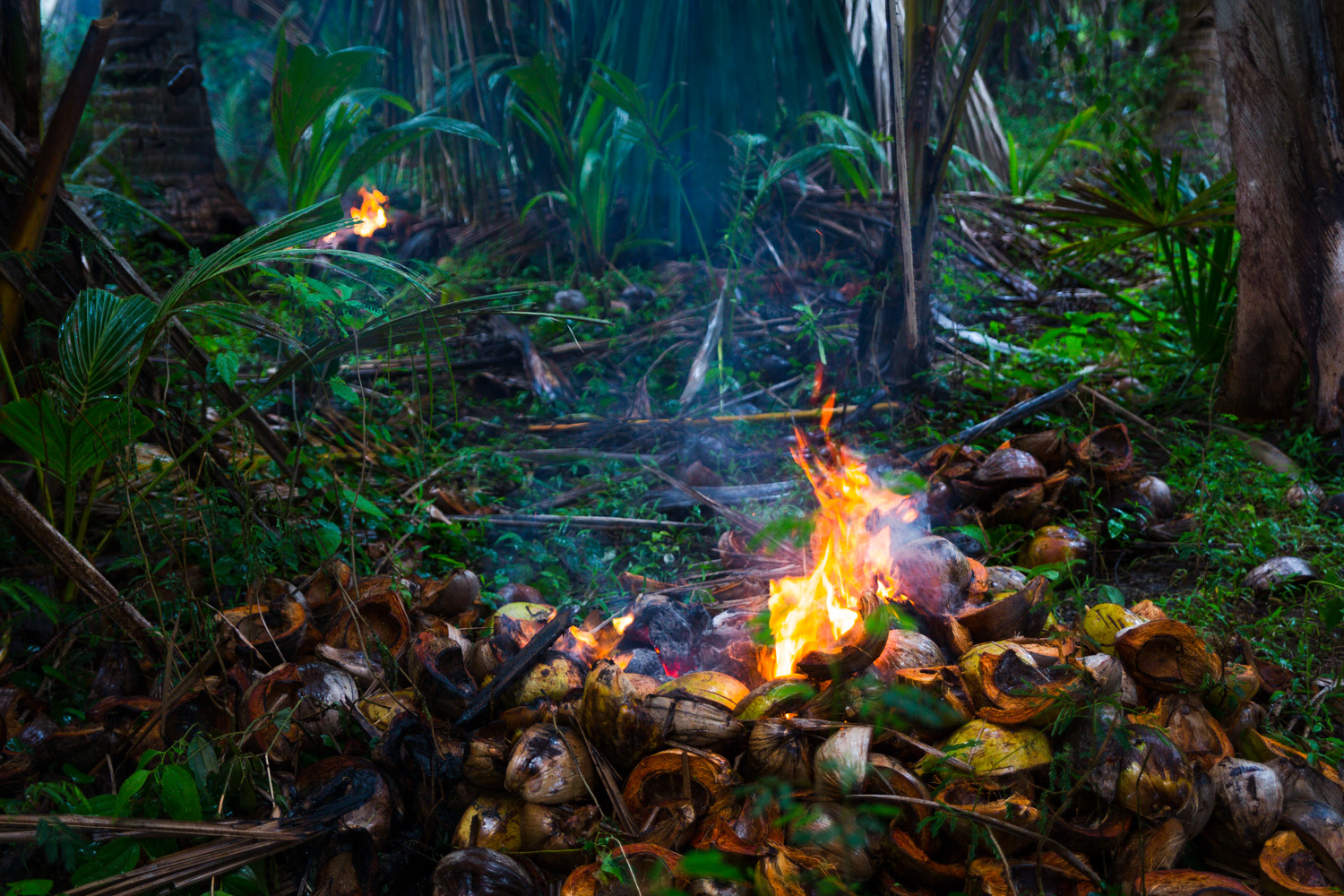
Natural gas fuels eternal flame in southern Babulo

After the start of the invasion in 1975, Indonesians entered Uato-Lari through Beaco in late 1976. A large part of the population fled their homes and sought shelter from the air raids. Some only managed to stay away for a few days, others fled for several months, building makeshift shelters and even planting fields. Others found refuge in the resistance base on the Matebian until its fall in 1978. The population slowly returned to the Suco by late November 1979. Indonesian settlers forcibly relocated most of the natives to gain more control. Uato-Lari (Leten) was the administrative center of the administrative office in the first half of the 20th century, until it was transferred to Uato-Lari in Matahoi Suco by the Indonesians. A relocation camp was established in Afaloicai, near Uato-Lari Leten. People from all six Uato-Lari Sucos and from the Baguia and Quelicai subdistricts were interned there. For the first few months, they were guarded by the Indonesian military and their East Timorese supporters, and they were not allowed to leave certain areas without escort. Accommodation and food, as well as access to fields and gardens, was limited. In the early 1980s, a new wave of settlement was started along the main streets in Uato-Lari Leten/Afaloicai, which became known as Kampung Baru. Since the restrictions on selecting a residence were still in place in the 1980s and early 1990s, fields and gardens that were further away could not be selected. Some people even decided to renounce their claims to land, as they feared or did not want to be suspected of collaboration with the Falintil rebels. The lack of land meant that all areas were used for cultivation, regardless of the traditional rules. The destruction of the clan structures and the restrictions on movement obstructed the ritual conversation with the ancestors. Ceremonies were banned, thus contributing to the collapse of the Suco's social system. Part of the structure was only preserved due to the Aldeias resettlements largely being in joint settlements. The Beliand Daralari, for example, came to the Aliambata area, which is located near several sacred structures, such as the "Eternal Flames". The Chefe de Suco from the Aha B Uu Aldeia also moved there with his family. The Elders of the Daralari continued to perform simplified versions of the usual ceremonies. Since independence, the older population has been moving back to the old villages, while the younger generations have stayed in the Indonesian settlements, as there is usually a better access to education and health care. Many also live in temporary accommodation near the fields during planting and harvesting.

After the 2007 parliamentary elections of Timor-Leste had been held and Xanana Gusmão had assumed office, civil unrest erupted, instigated by supporters of the defeated Fretilin party. An unspecified number of people fled from their homes and made their way to Mount Babulo. Over 900 inhabitants of Uato-Laris took refuge in Uatucarbau, others in the town of Viqueque.

In early July 2010 flash floods destroyed 95 buildings in the town of Aliambata. Costodio Silveiro Fernandes, the Chefe de Suco, asked the government to relocate the people affected.

== Politics ==
Mario Lisboa was elected Chefe de Suco in the 2004-2005 local elections in East Timor. He is from the aldeia Cota Nisi. As in other parts of the country, only representatives of the "leading lineage" were eligible for election as Chefe de Suco. Costodio Silveiro Fernandes won the 2009 local elections in East Timor, although he is not a member of the traditional leading family. Mario Trindade from the aldeia of Aha B Uu was elected Chefe de Suco in 2016.

== Economy, infrastructure and living conditions ==
According to the census of 2015, 2.70% of the inhabitants were considered as unemployed, a further 45.02% were registered as inactive, as they were retired or their personal needs depended on agriculture, for example.

43.1% of the households farmed only for their personal needs, 56.2% also sold a small part, only 0.7% produced primary agricultural products for trade. They cultivate manioc, maize, sweet potatoes, beans and other vegetables and roots. Wet rice is cultivated at the Bebui, dry rice on the higher levels. In addition, there are coconut and lightnut cultivating areas which allow many families to earn an income. Families also fish and hunt (illegally). The 2015 census also records that 3800 chickens, 1300 pigs, 950 sheep, 770 goats, 275 horses, 940 beef und 480 water buffalos were kept in the Suco. In 14.07% of the households there are tools to manufacture Tais, East Timors woven clothes.

There is a primary school in both Uai Cai as well as in Aliambata and a medical station in Uai Cai.

Most of the residential buildings in the Suco are still simple cottages. At the time of the census, only 19.6% had solid outer walls, at least 58.5% had a roof made of modern materials. 26.6% of the households had access to sanitary facilities, 35.4% to a clean water source and 51.9% an electricity supply. 90.11% used wood as an energy source for cooking, 7.91% electricity. The living conditions for the inhabitants in these sectors have improved since 2010. 79.56% of the households of Babulo possessed a telephone, 19.56% a TV, 9.01% a radio, 13.19% a motorbike, 0.44% a car and 1.98% a computer with Internet access.
