= Viqueque =

- City
- Cidade de Viqueque (Portuguese); Cidade Vikeke (Tetun)
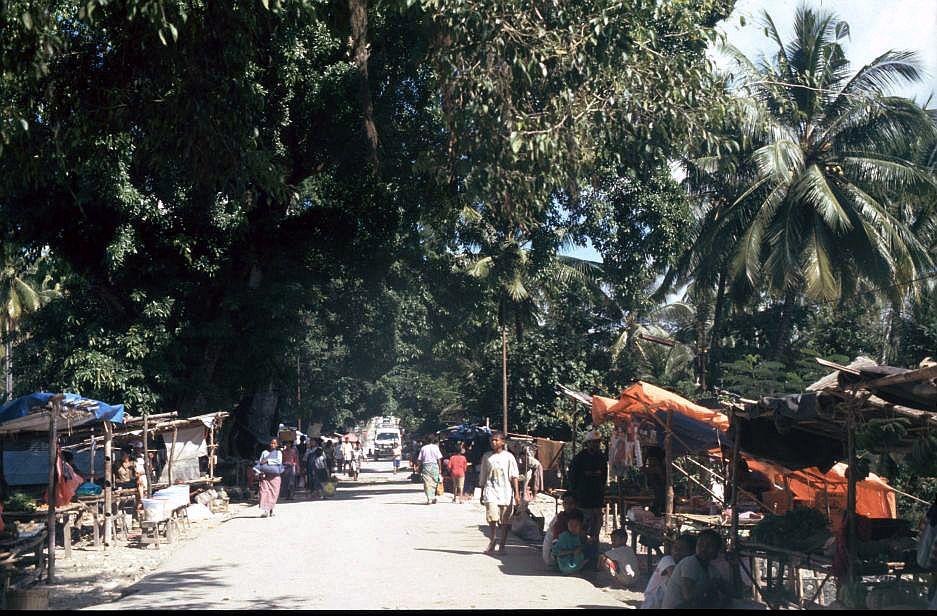
- Marketplace in Viqueque

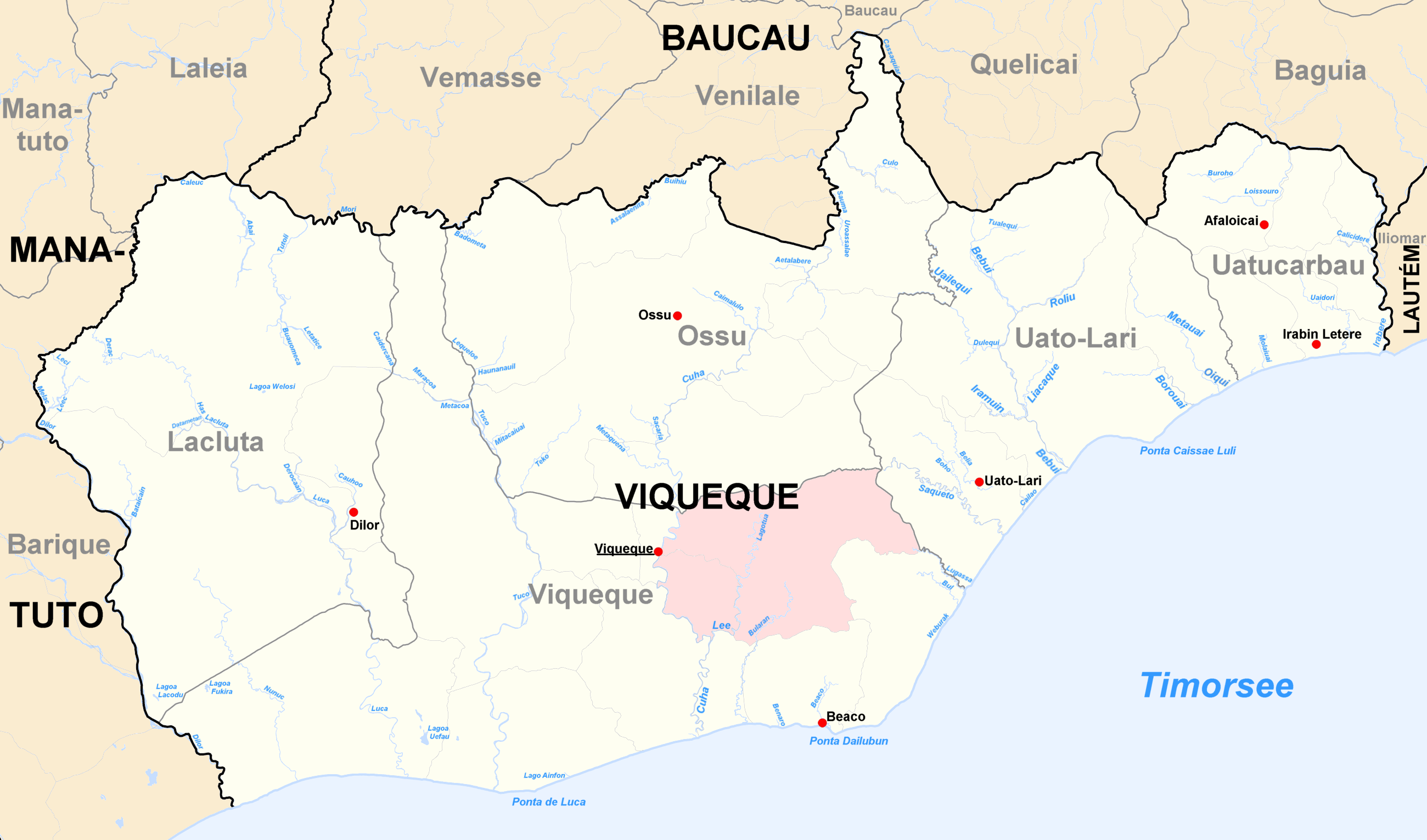

- Location in East Timor
- Coordinates: 8°51′27″S 126°21′53″E
- Country: Timor-Leste
- Municipality: Viqueque
- Administrative post: Viqueque
- Elevation: 140 m (460 ft)

Population (2015 census)
  - Total: 6,859
- Time zone: UTC+09:00 (TLT)
- Climate: Aw

Viqueque (Portuguese: Viqueque, Tetun: Vikeke) is a city in the south-east of Timor-Leste, 183 km from Dili, the nation's capital. Viqueque is the capital of Viqueque Municipality, which has five administrative posts under its control: Uato-Lari, Uatu-Carbau, Viqueque, Lacluta and Ossu. The city has a population of 6,859 (2015), the administrative post has 20,640 (2004), the municipality 65,245 inhabitants (2004).

In 1959, there was a rebellion against the Portuguese administration.
