= Viqueque Municipality =

Municipality of East Timor

Viqueque
- Municipality of Timor-Leste
- Município Viqueque (Portuguese); Munisípiu Vikeke (Tetun)
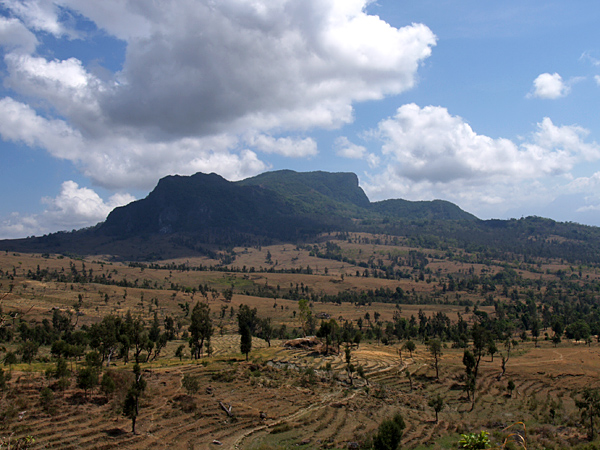
- Rice fields in Viqueque

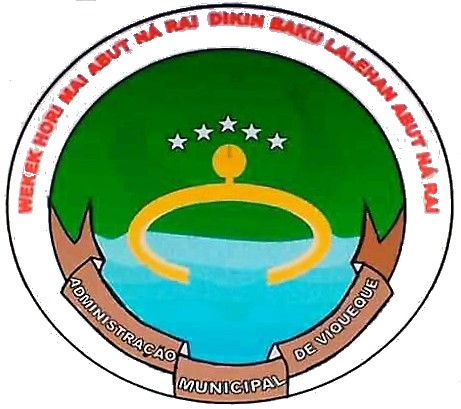
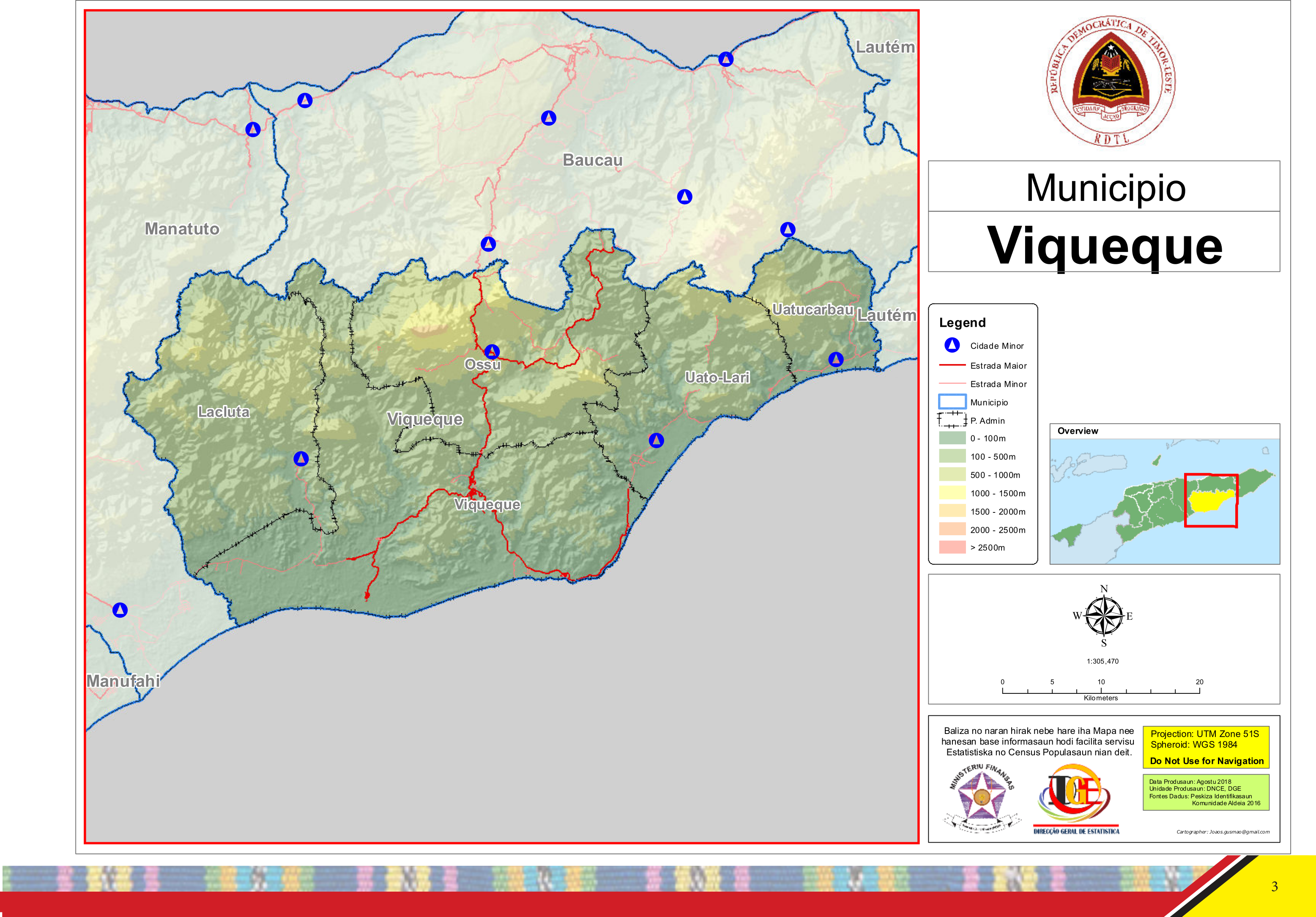
- Seal Official map

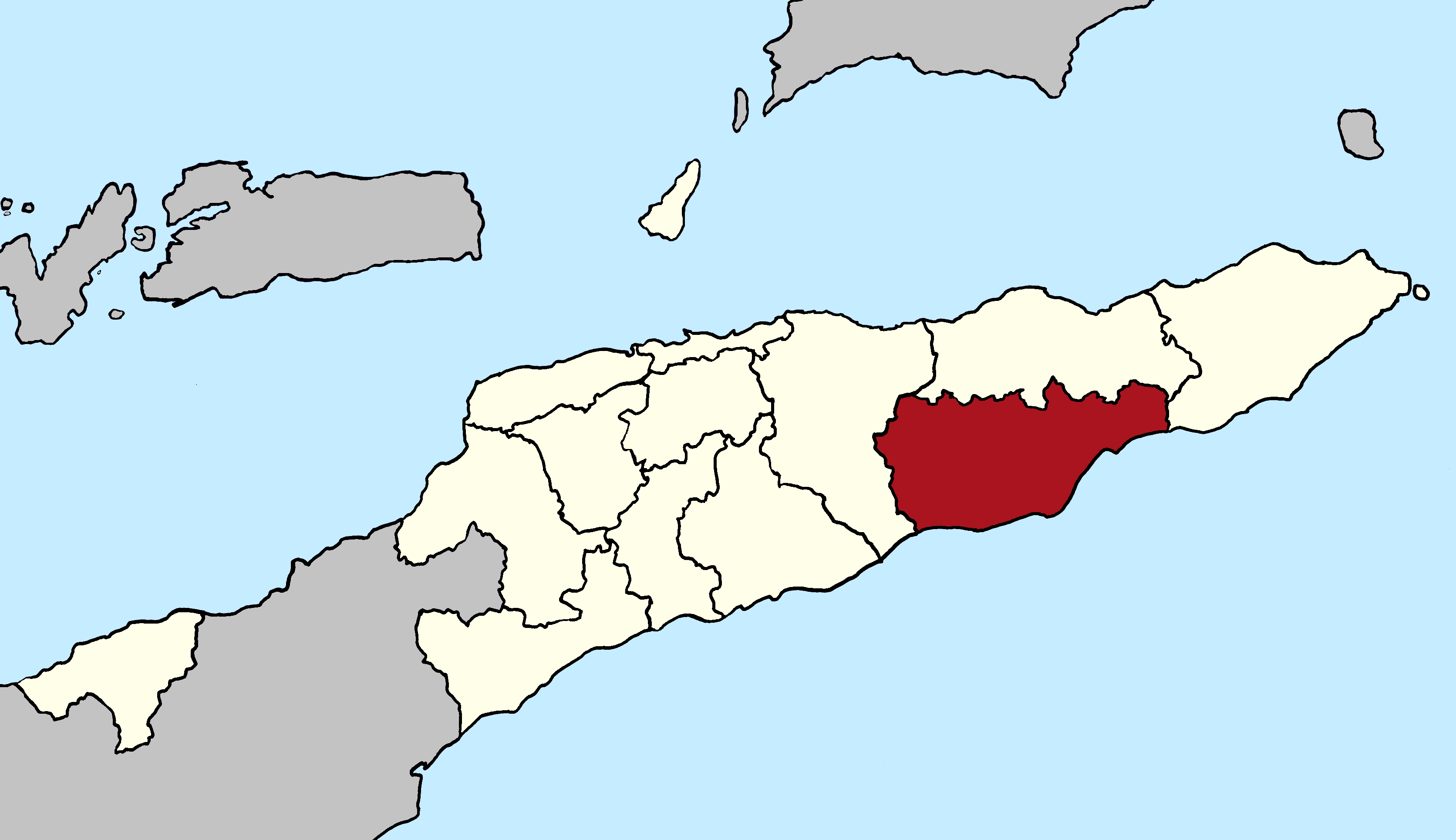
- Viqueque in Timor-Leste
- Interactive map of Viqueque
- Coordinates: 8°47′S 126°22′E
- Country: Timor-Leste
- Capital: Viqueque
- Administrative posts: Lacluta; Ossu; Uato-Lari; Uatucarbau; Viqueque

Area
  - Total: 1,872.7 km^{2} (723.1 sq mi)
  - Rank: 1st

Population (2015 census)
  - Total: 73,033
  - Rank: 5th
  - Density: 38.999/km^{2} (101.01/sq mi)
  - Rank: 10th

Households (2015 census)
  - Total: 15,297
  - Rank: 5th
- Time zone: UTC+09:00 (TLT)
- ISO 3166 code: TL-VI
- HDI (2017): 0.602 medium · 9th
- Website: Viqueque Municipality

Viqueque (Portuguese: Município Viqueque, Tetun: Munisípiu Vikeke) is the largest of the municipalities (formerly districts) of Timor-Leste. It has a population of 77,402 (Census 2010) and an area of 1,877 km^{2}. The capital of the municipality is also named Viqueque.

== Toponymy ==
Viqueque is a Portuguese approximation of the local Tetun-Terik word Vikeke (or Wekeke), which has been translated as both 'eroding water' and 'water' (we) 'bracelet' (keke).

The background to the latter translation is that a warrior leader, Luka, is said once to have been on a campaign with his warriors against the Wehali people, who had entered Luka's lands via Suai, Same, and Manatuto. During the campaign, he and the warriors came upon a spring guarded by an old woman. After the woman had given the warriors the water they had asked for, they cut off her arm, on which she had been wearing a bracelet. They then took the arm and bracelet to their king, Nai Lu Leki, who hung the arm in a tree. He also kept the bracelet and declared it sacred, as We Keke.

According to another tradition, a queen of the kingdom of Luka gave a bracelet to Viqueque as an heirloom, and today the municipality is named after it.

== Geography ==
Viqueque is on the south coast of Timor, on the Timor Sea. It borders the municipalities of Baucau to the north, Lautém to the east, and Manatuto to the west. The borders of the then district were the same in colonial times.

On the south coast, the people report both myths and possible occurrences of crocodiles.

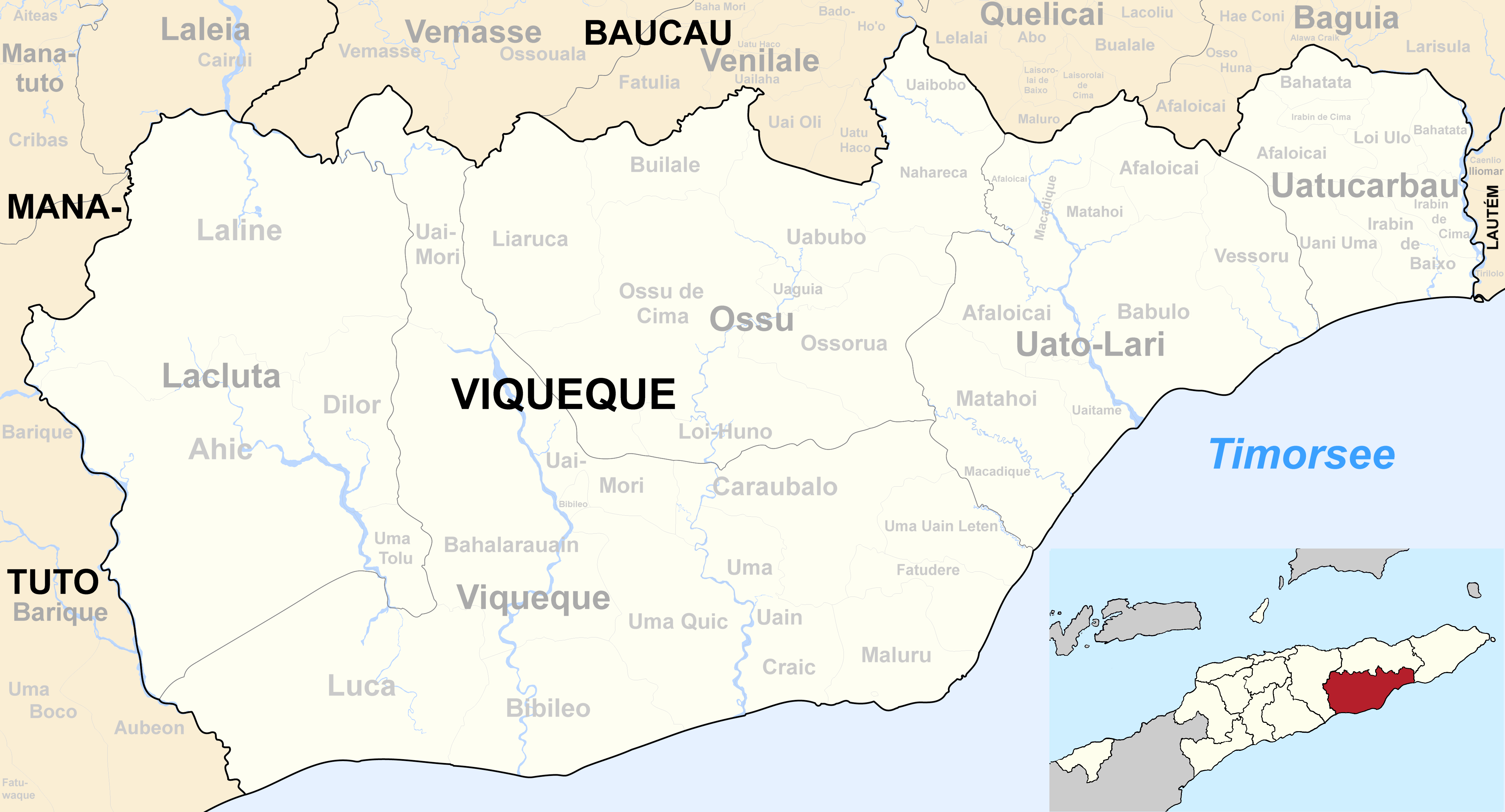
Administrative posts of Viqueque

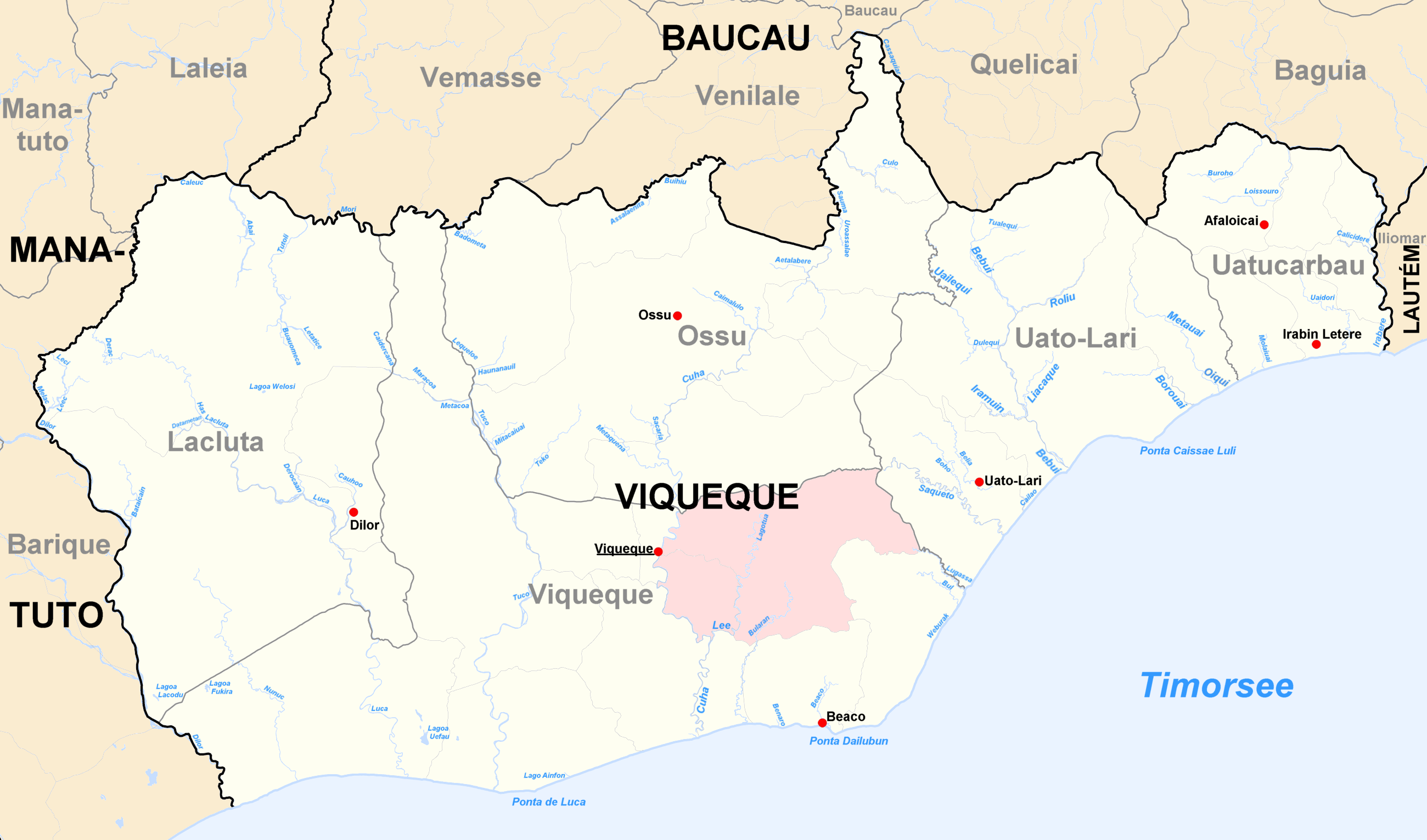
Cities and rivers of Viqueque

== History ==
According to a list prepared by Afonso de Castro, governor of the colony of Portuguese Timor from 1859 to 1863, Viqueque was one of 47 kingdoms in that colony at the time.

== Administrative posts ==
The municipality's administrative posts (formerly sub-districts) are:

- Lacluta
- Ossu
- Uato-Lari (which was known in Portuguese Timor as Leça, and, in Tetum, is spelled Watulari)
- Uatucarbau (spelled Watucarbau, in Tetum)
- Viqueque

The administrative posts are divided into 35 sucos ("villages") in total.

== Demographics ==
Viqueque is a homeland of the Malayo-Polynesian language Tetum. In Timor-Leste it is co-official with Portuguese. In the east part of the municipality live speakers of the Papuan language Makasae.
