= Viqueque Administrative Post =

Administrative post in Viqueque Municipality, Timor-Leste

Viqueque
- Administrative Post
- Posto Administrativo de Viqueque (Portuguese); Postu administrativu Vikeke (Tetun)
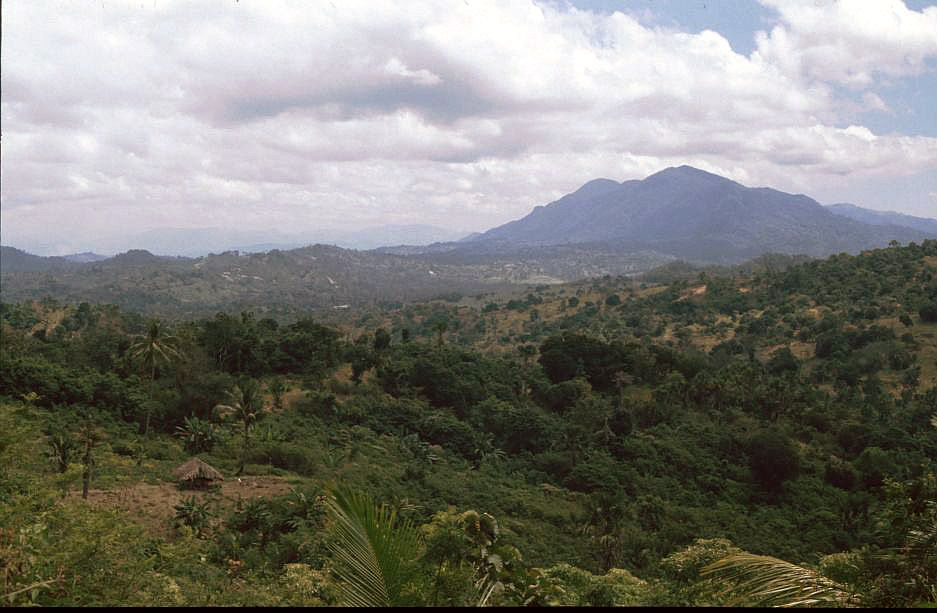
- Viqueque landscape

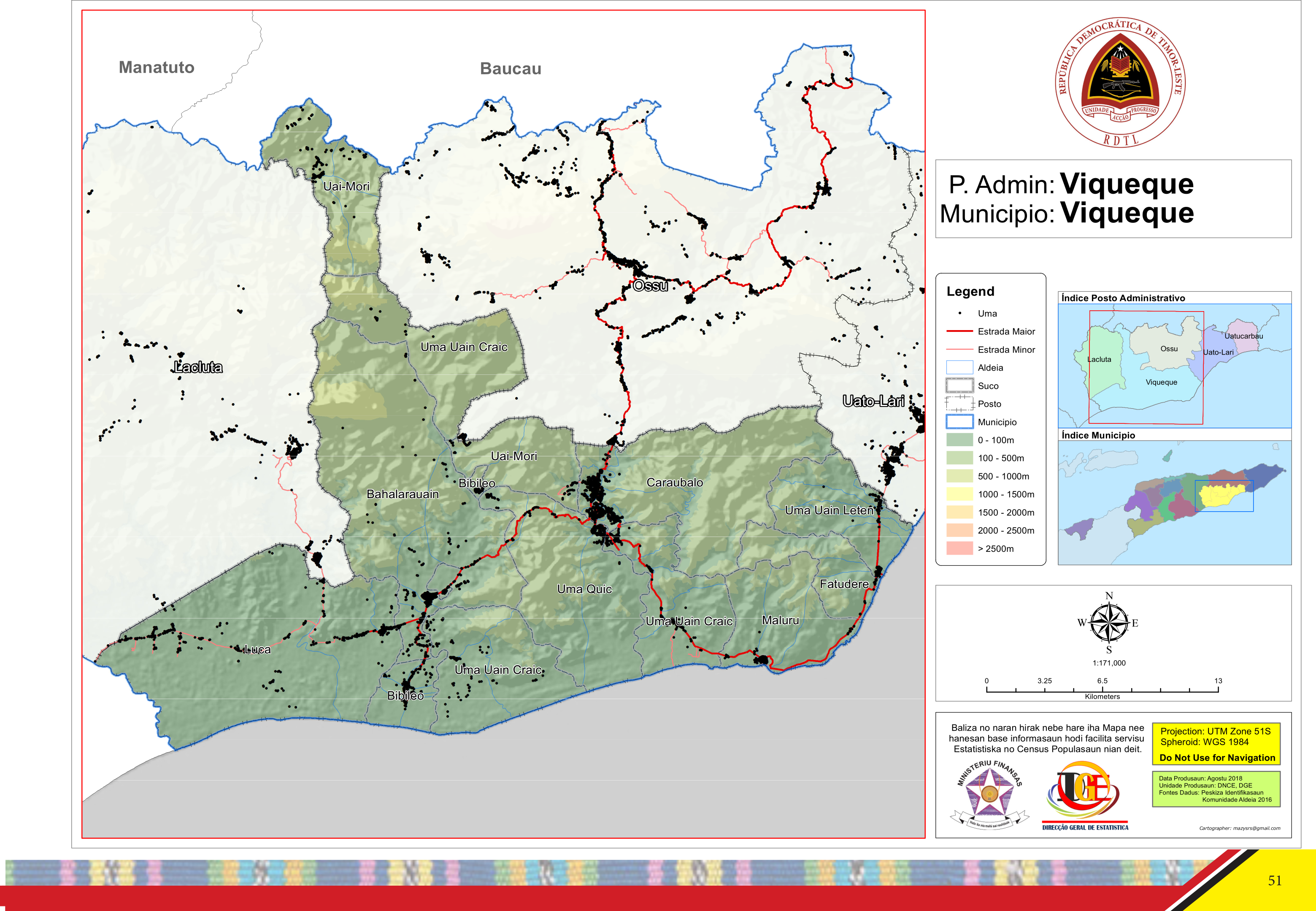
- Official map

- Location within East Timor
- Coordinates: 8°51′S 126°22′E
- Country: Timor-Leste
- Municipality: Viqueque
- Seat: Caraubalo
- Sucos: Bahalarauain; Bibileo; Caraubalo; Fatudere; Luca; Maluru; Uai-Mori; Uma Quic; Uma Uain Craic; Uma Uain Leten

Area
  - Total: 636.2 km^{2} (245.6 sq mi)

Population (2015 census)
  - Total: 25,755
  - Density: 40.48/km^{2} (104.8/sq mi)

Households (2015 census)
  - Total: 5,032
- Time zone: UTC+09:00 (TLT)

Viqueque, officially Viqueque Administrative Post (Portuguese: Posto Administrativo de Viqueque, Tetun: Postu administrativu Vikeke), is an administrative post in Viqueque municipality, Timor-Leste. Its seat or administrative centre is Caraubalo.
