= Lacluta Administrative Post =

Administrative post in Viqueque Municipality, Timor-Leste

Lacluta
- Administrative Post
- Posto Administrativo de Lacluta (Portuguese); Postu administrativu Lakluta (Tetun)
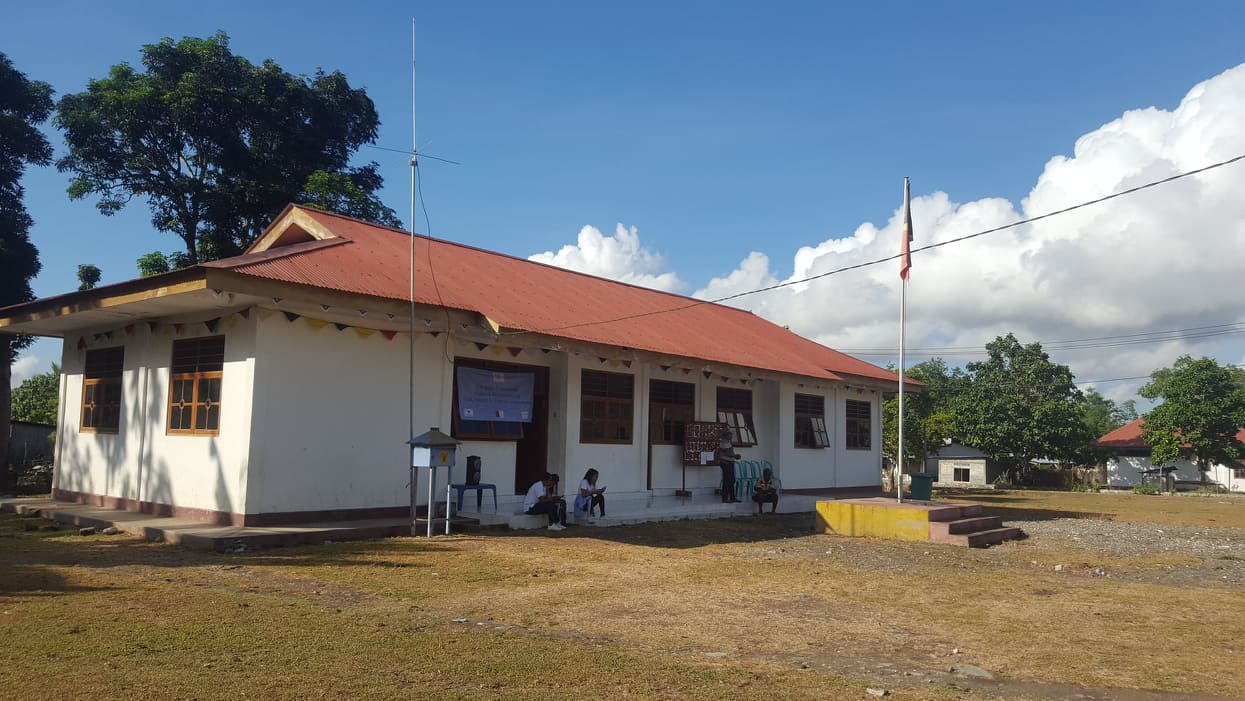
- Administrative building of Lacluta in Dilor

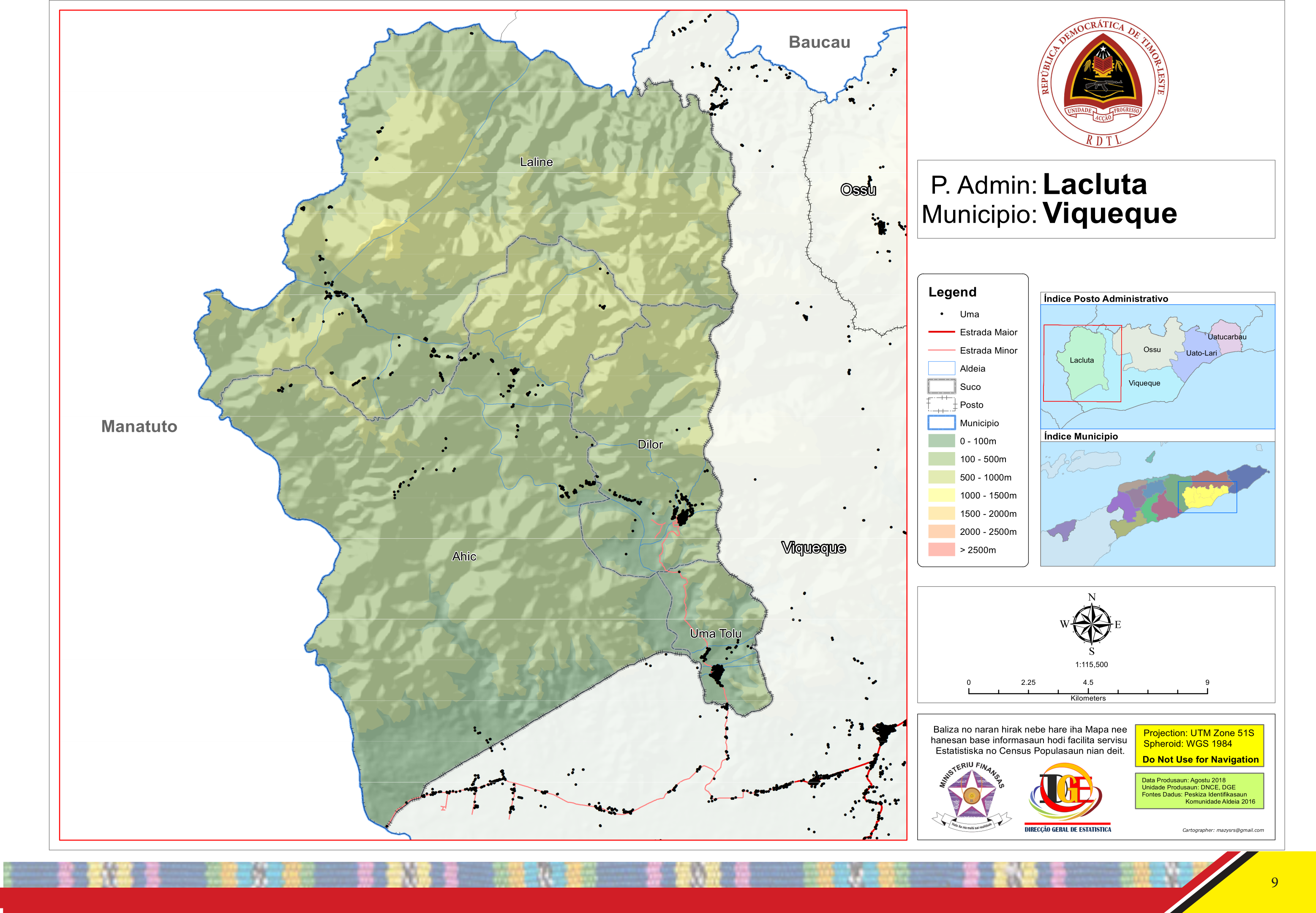
- Official map

- Location within East Timor
- Coordinates: 8°48′S 126°08′E
- Country: Timor-Leste
- Municipality: Viqueque
- Seat: Dilor
- Sucos: Ahic; Dilor; Laline; Uma Tolu

Area
  - Total: 414.2 km^{2} (159.9 sq mi)

Population (2015 census)
  - Total: 6,808
  - Density: 16.44/km^{2} (42.57/sq mi)

Households (2015 census)
  - Total: 1,237
- Time zone: UTC+09:00 (TLT)

Lacluta, officially Lacluta Administrative Post (Portuguese: Posto Administrativo de Lacluta, Tetun: Postu administrativu Lakluta), is an administrative post (and was formerly a subdistrict) in Viqueque municipality, Timor-Leste. Its seat or administrative centre is Dilor.
