= Uato-Lari Administrative Post =

Administrative post in Viqueque Municipality, Timor-Leste

Uato-Lari
- Administrative Post
- Posto Administrativo de Uato-Lari (Portuguese); Postu administrativu Watulari (Tetun)
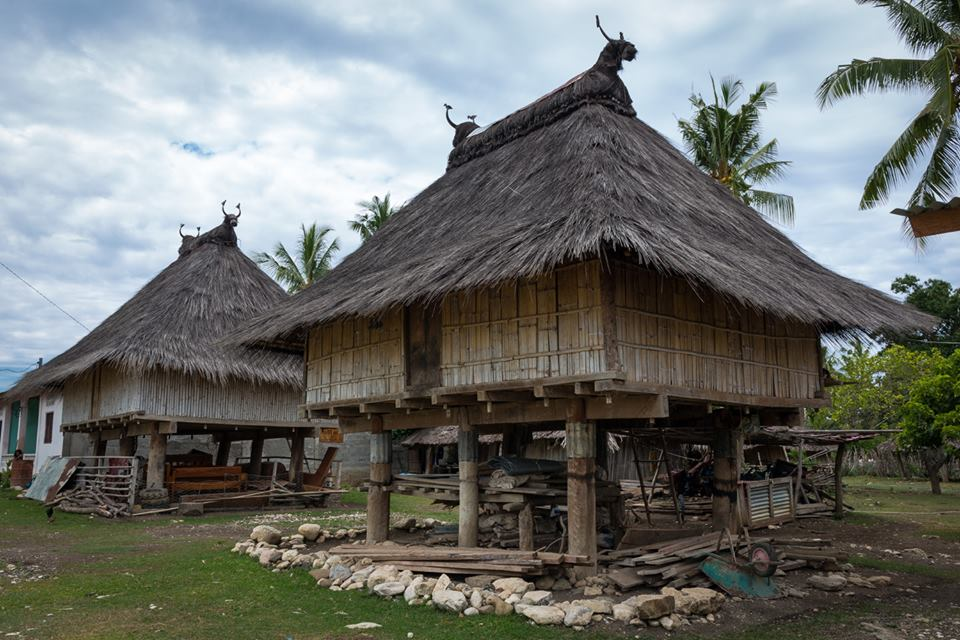
- Uma Lulik (transl. sacred houses) in Vessoru

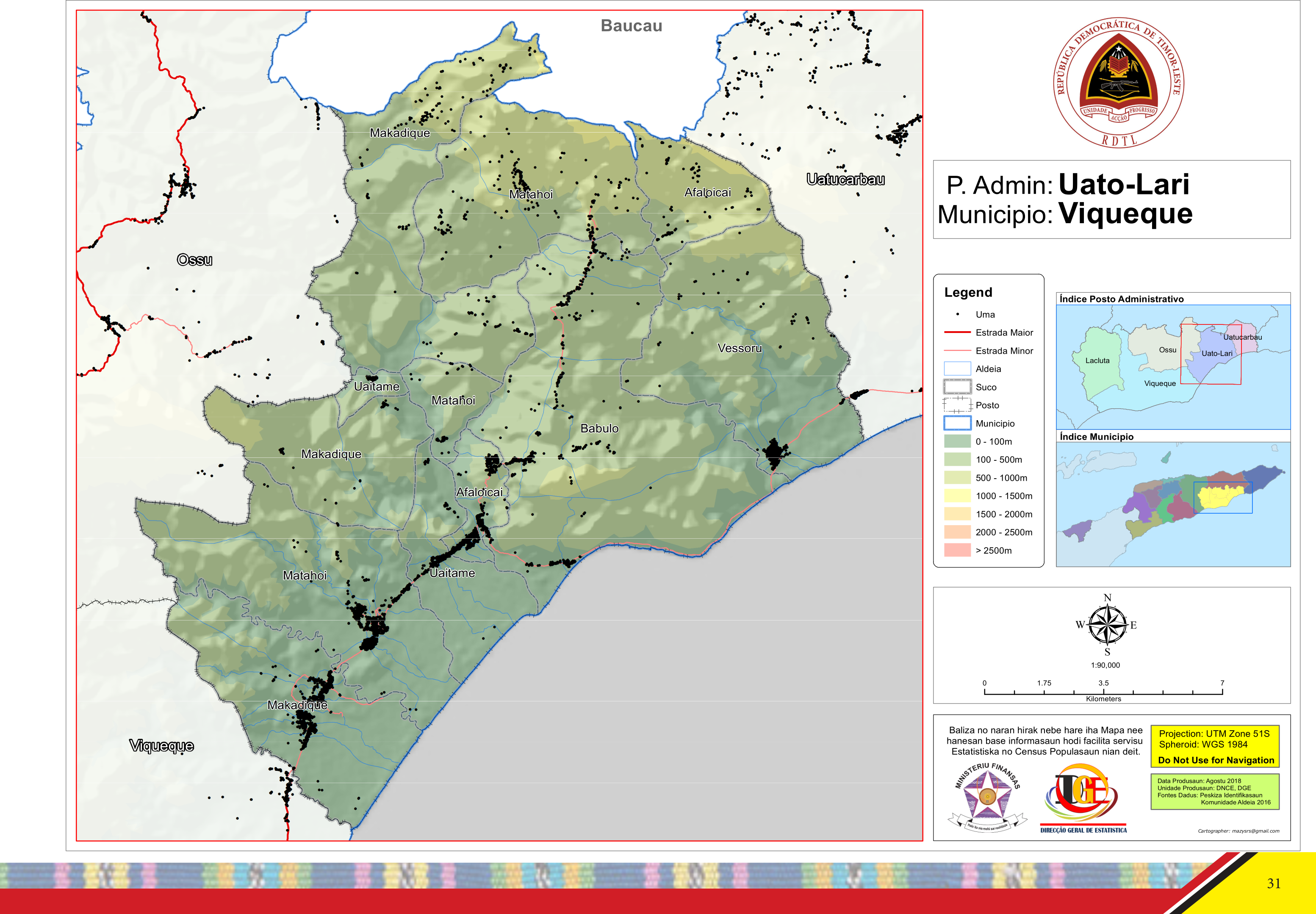
- Official map

- Location within East Timor
- Coordinates: 8°49′16″S 126°32′01″E
- Country: Timor-Leste
- Municipality: Viqueque
- Seat: Matahoi
- Sucos: Afaloicai; Babulo; Macadique; Matahoi; Uaitame; Vessoru

Area
  - Total: 287.9 km^{2} (111.2 sq mi)

Population (2015 census)
  - Total: 18,908
  - Density: 65.68/km^{2} (170.1/sq mi)

Households (2015 census)
  - Total: 3,858
- Time zone: UTC+09:00 (TLT)

Uato-Lari (Watu-Lari, Watulari, Hato-Lari, Uatolari, Uatolári, Uatulari, Uatu-Lari), officially Uato-Lari Administrative Post (Portuguese: Posto Administrativo de Uato-Lari, Tetun: Postu administrativu Watulari), is an administrative post (and was formerly a subdistrict) in Viqueque municipality, Timor-Leste. Its seat or administrative centre is Matahoi.
