= Uatucarbau Administrative Post =

Administrative post in Viqueque Municipality, Timor-Leste

Uatucarbau
- Administrative Post
- Posto Administrativo de Uatucarbau (Portuguese); Postu administrativu Watucarbau (Tetun)
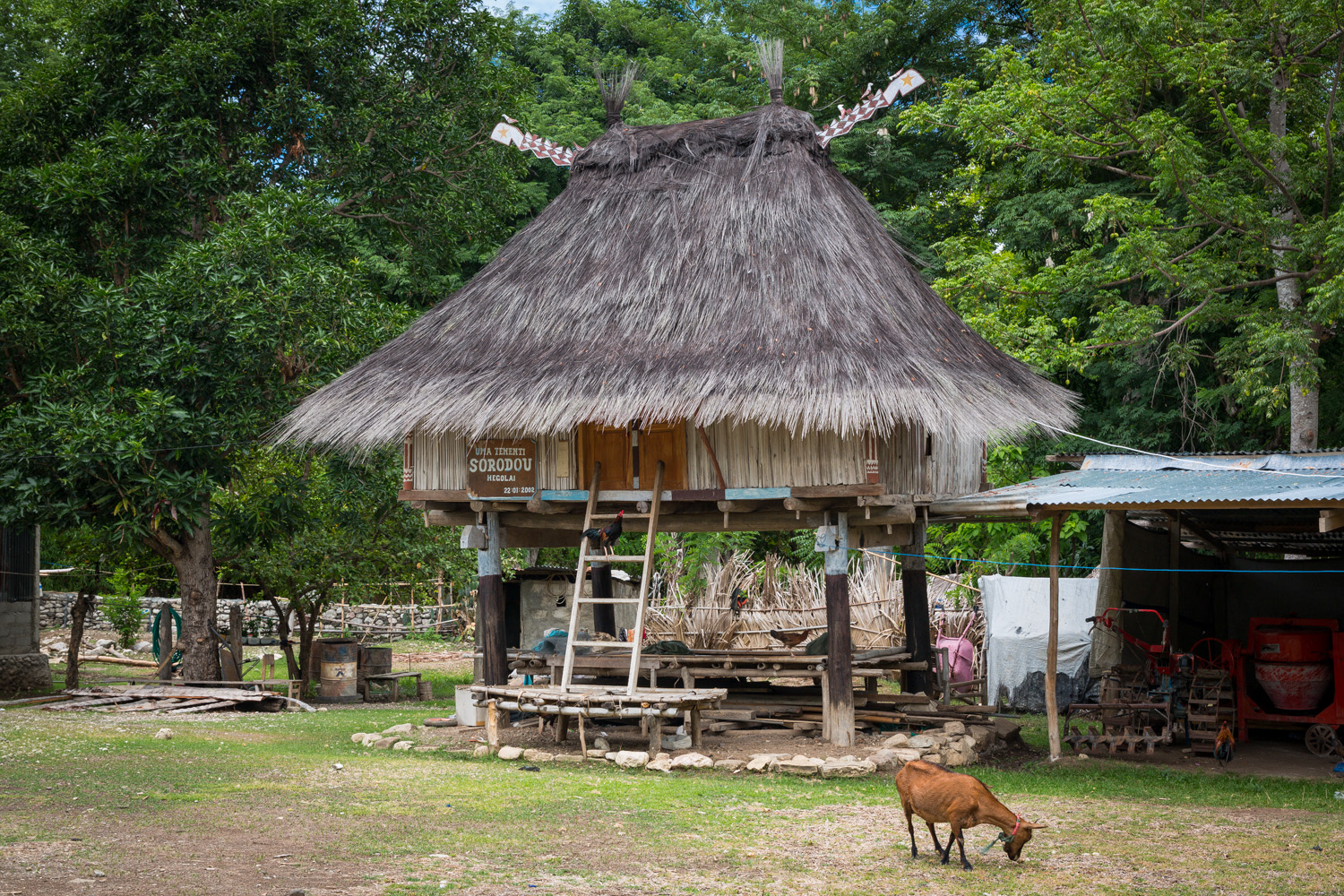
- Uma Lulik (transl. sacred house) in Suco Uani Uma

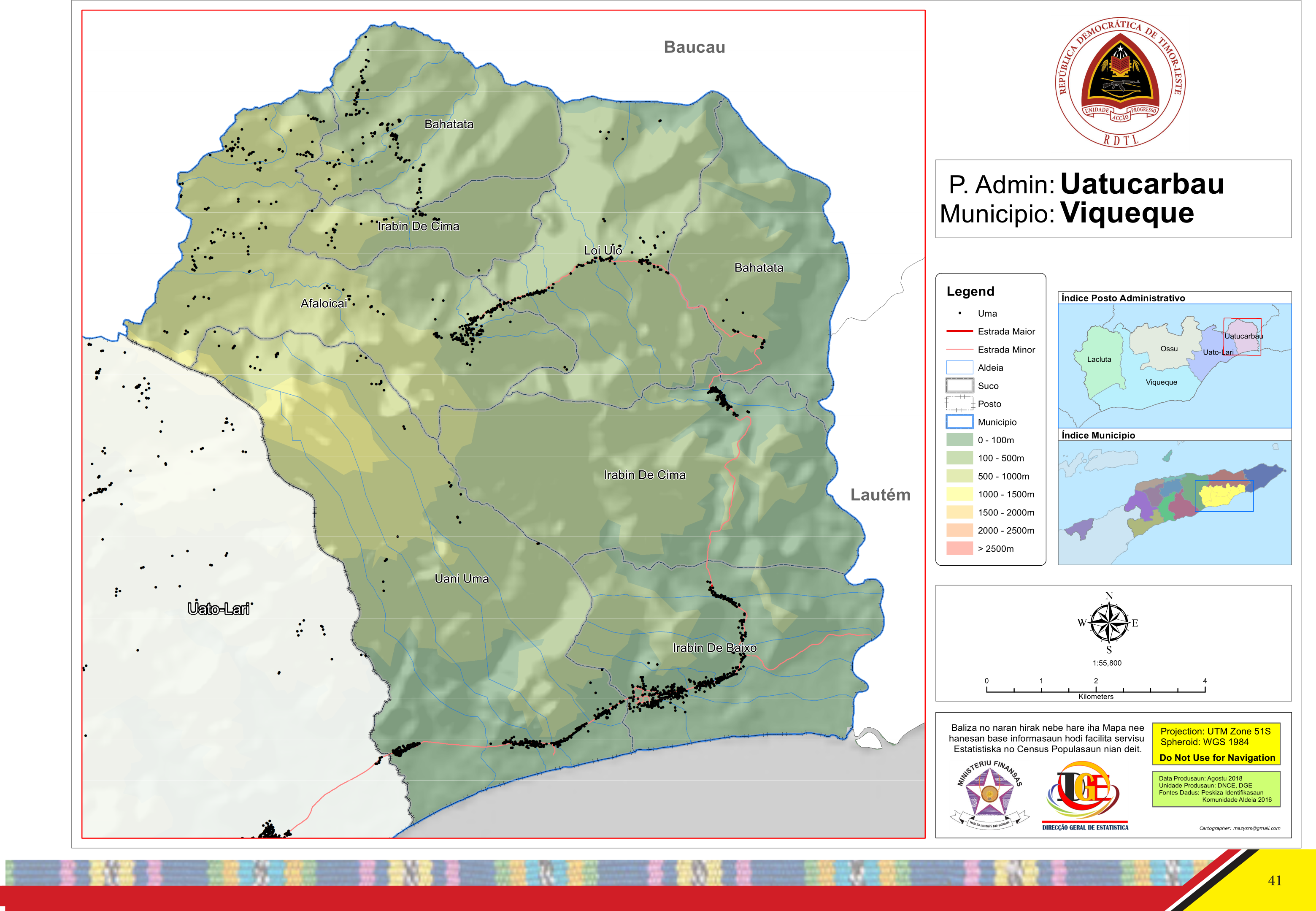
- Official map

- Location within East Timor
- Coordinates: 8°42′S 126°41′E
- Country: Timor-Leste
- Municipality: Viqueque
- Seat: Irabin de Baixo
- Sucos: Afaloicai; Bahatata; Irabin de Baixo; Irabin de Cima; Loi Ulo; Uani Uma

Area
  - Total: 130.7 km^{2} (50.5 sq mi)

Population (2015 census)
  - Total: 7,401
  - Density: 56.63/km^{2} (146.7/sq mi)

Households (2015 census)
  - Total: 1,453
- Time zone: UTC+09:00 (TLT)

Uatucarbau (Uato Carabau), officially Uatucarbau Administrative Post (Portuguese: Posto Administrativo de Uatucarbau, Tetun: Postu administrativu Watucarbau), is an administrative post (and was formerly a subdistrict) in Viqueque municipality, Timor-Leste. Its seat or administrative centre is Irabin de Baixo.
