= Sahen River =

River in Timor-Leste

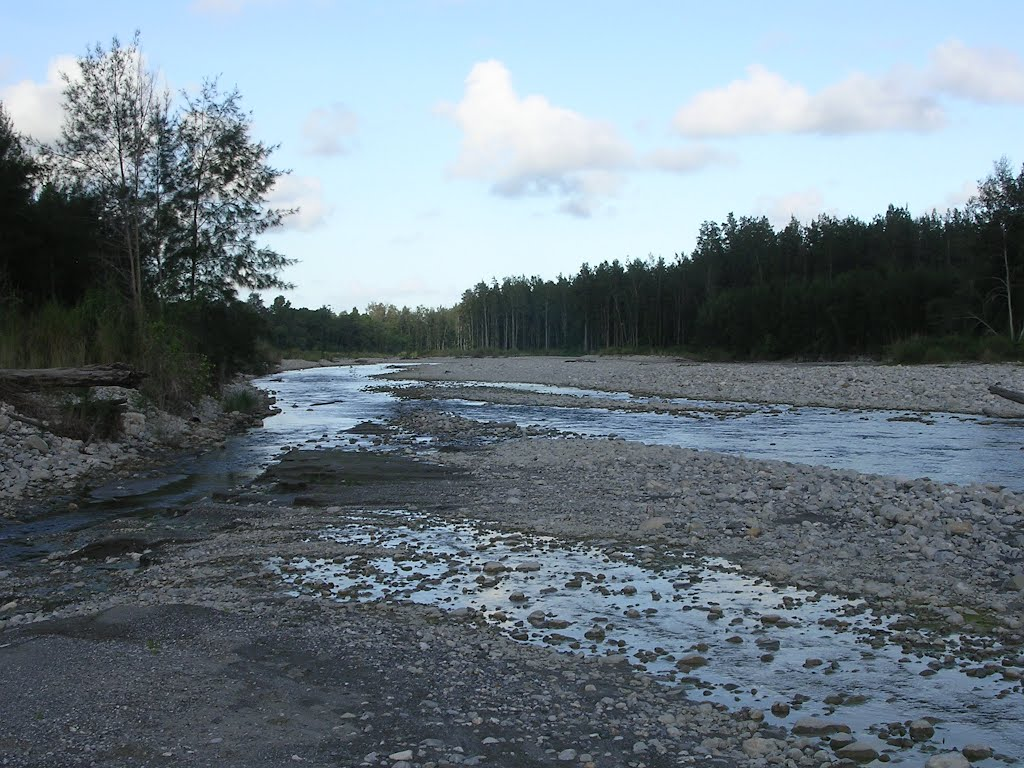
- Tall Casuarina forest along the river in Manufahi in 2005

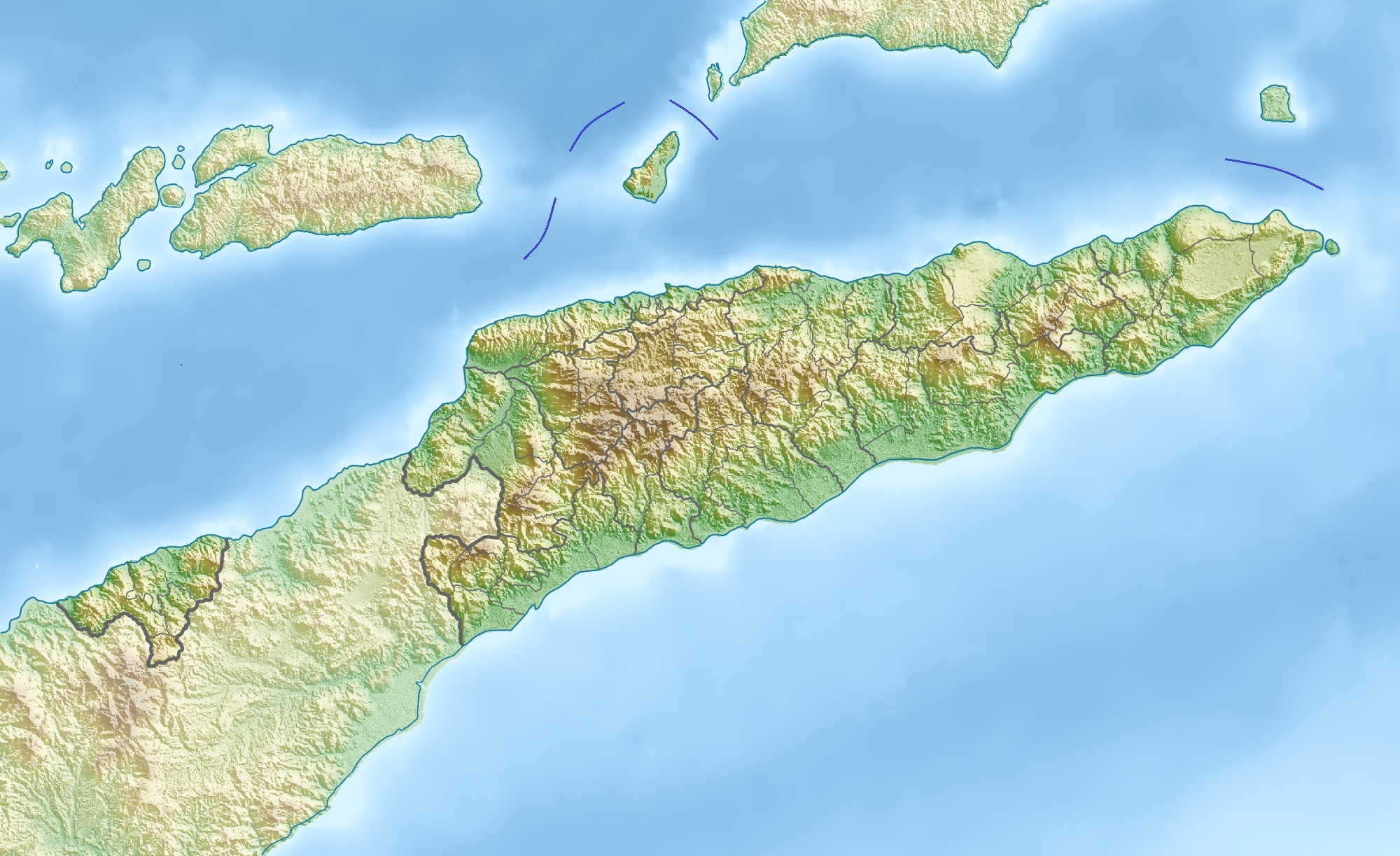
- Location of river mouth
- Native name: Rio Sáhen (Portuguese); Mota Sáhen (Tetum)

Location
- Country: Timor-Leste
- Municipalities: Manatuto; Manufahi

Physical characteristics
- Source confluence
  - location: Tripoint of Sucos Manelima and Orlalan, Laclubar, and Suco Manlala, Soibada
  - coordinates: 8°49′54″S 125°57′22″E
- Mouth: Timor Sea
  - location: Welaluhu, Manufahi
  - coordinates: 9°03′35″S 126°03′44″E
- Basin size: ~ 294 km^{2} (114 sq mi)

Basin features
- Tributaries
  - left: Bun / Buti River; Quic River; Lianura / Laniara River
  - right: Buarahum / Buarahuin River; Motana River

The Sahen River (Portuguese: Rio Sáhen, Tetum: Mota Sahen) is a river in Timor-Leste. It originates in central Manatuto municipality, flows in a mostly southerly direction, and then discharges into the Timor Sea at the southern tip of the border between Manatuto and Manufahi municipalities.

== Course ==
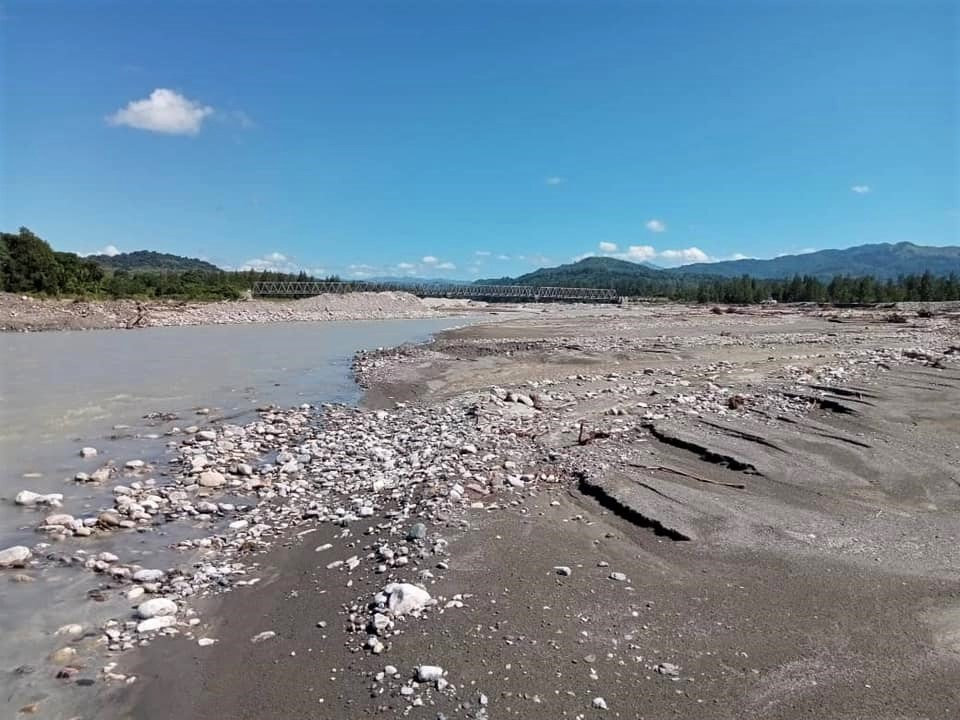
View of the river near Uma Boco, Barique administrative post

The river rises in the portion of Timor-Leste's central mountains situated in central Manatuto municipality. Its headwaters, located just to the south of the town of Laclubar, are shared with two of its main tributaries, the Buarahum/Buarahuin and the Bun/Buti Rivers.

Further south, at the tripoint of Sucos Manelima and Orlalan, Laclubar administrative post, and Suco Manlala, Soibada administrative post, both in Manatuto, those two tributaries converge with each other to become the source confluence of the river itself.

From the source confluence, the river flows south-southwest to the border between Manatuto and Manufahi municipalities, and then runs along that border, mostly in a south-southeasterly direction, until it empties into the Timor Sea at the shore of the Quirás plain, near Welaluhu, Manufahi.

The river is spanned by two road bridges. One of them, east of the village of Soibada, provides access to the village from national road A09, which links Manatuto with Uma Boco in Barique administrative post; the other one carries national road A14 across the river just to the west of Uma Boco. As of 2022, the former bridge and the road leading to it were both damaged and in need of repairs.

The main tributaries of the river, in order of entrance, are as follows:

- Buarahum (or Buarahuin) River: rises as the Buarahum River on the border between Sucos Fatumaquerec and Funar, Laculabar administrative post, southwest of Laclubar; flows generally southeastwards, to the tripoint between Sucos Fatumaquerec, Funar and Manelima, all in Laculabar, and then almost immediately to the tripoint between Sucos Fatumaquerec and Manelima, Laclubar, and Suco Maun-Fahe, Sobibada administrative post; in this area, it becomes the Buarahuin River, which then flows southeastwards, as the border between Laclubar and Soibada administrative posts, and then as the border between Sucos Manelima, Laclubar, and Manlala, Soibada, until it reaches the tripoint of Sucos Manelima and Orlalan, Laclubar, and Suco Manlala, Soibada, where it merges with the Bun (or Buti) River (see below) to become the source confluence of the Sahen River;
- Bun (or Buti) River: rises a short distance southeast of Laclubar, on the border between Sucos Manelima and Orlalan, Laclubar administrative post; flows initially southeastwards, and then southwards, along that border until it reaches the tripoint of Sucos Manelima and Orlalan, Laclubar, and Suco Manlala, Soibada, where it merges with the Buarahum (or Buarahuin) River (see above) to become the source confluence of the Sahen River.
- Quic River: rises in Suco Samoro, Soibada administrative post; flows a short distance southeastwards to the border between Sucos Samoro and Leo-Hat, Soibada, where it enters the Sahen River;
- Motana River: rises in Suco Manehat, Barique administrative post, Manatuto; flows southwesterly, mostly along the border between that suco and Suco Leo-Hat, Soibada, until it enters the Sahen River at the tripoint between those two sucos and Suco Samoro, Soibada;
- Lianura (or Laniara) River: rises as the Lianura River on the border between Sucos Manehat and Uma Boco, Barique administrative post, southeast of Soibada and southwest of Barique; flows generally southwards, to the tripoint between Sucos Manehat, Uma Boco and Fatuwaque, all in Barique, where it is augmented by a tributary, the Quec River, and becomes the Laniara River; then flows further southwards, as the border between Sucos Manehat and Fatuwaque, until it reaches the tripoint of those two sucos and Suco Clacuc, Fatuberlio administrative post, Manufahi, where it enters the Sahen River.

== Catchment ==
The catchment or drainage basin of the river is one of Timor-Leste's 10 major catchments, and is approximately 294 km^{2} (114 sq mi) in area.

Timor-Leste has been broadly divided into twelve 'hydrologic units', groupings of climatologically and physiographically similar and adjacent river catchments. The Sahen River catchment is one of the four major catchments in the Tukan & Sahen hydrologic unit, which is about 1,379.8 km^{2} (532.7 sq mi) in total area, and covers 9.2% of the country; the others are the catchments of the Tuco (Wetuai), Luca and Dilor rivers.

== Economy ==
The catchment has been assessed as having potential for the construction of a large scale multi-purpose dam to harvest raw water and generate hydroelectricity by hydropower.

== See also ==
- List of rivers of Timor-Leste
