= Laleia River =

River in Timor-Leste

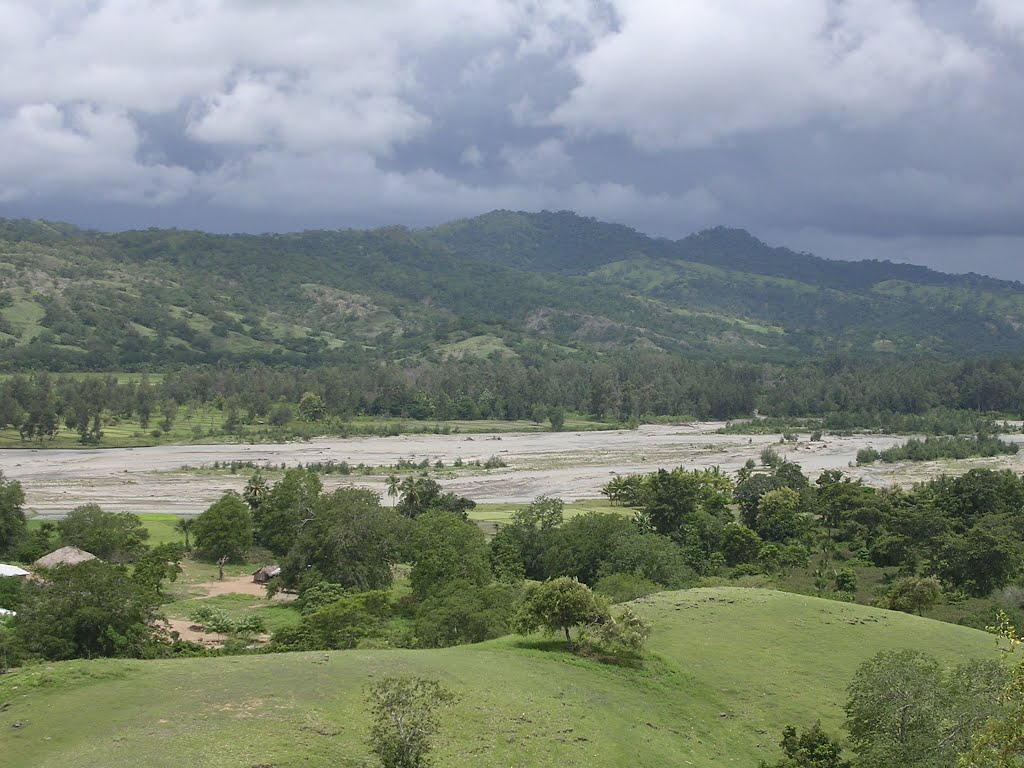
- A braided channel of the river, lined with Savanna and Casuarina

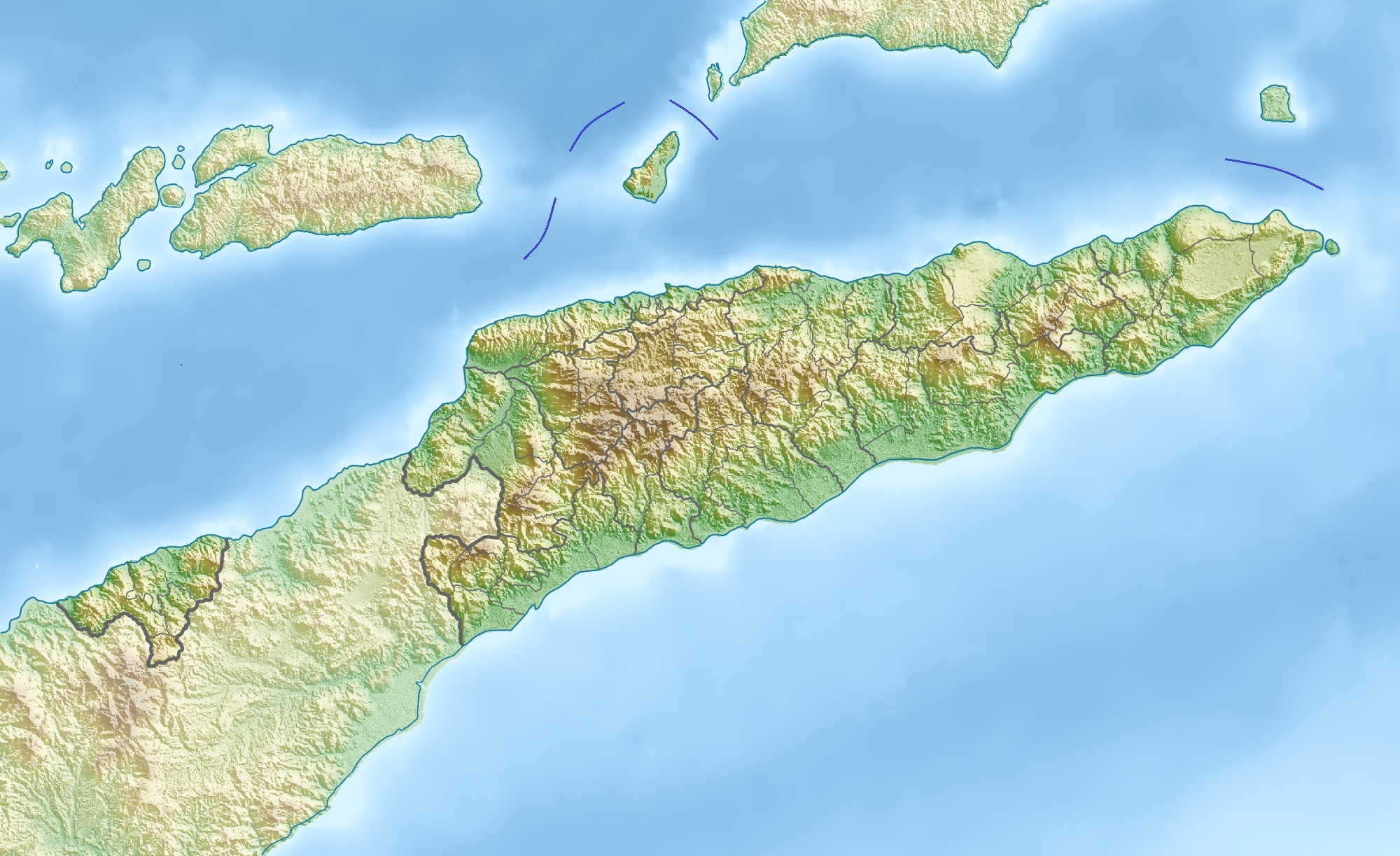
- Location of river mouth
- Native name: Ribeira de Laleia /; Rio de Laleia (Portuguese); Mota Laleia (Tetum)

Location
- Country: Timor-Leste
- Municipalities: Baucau; Manatuto; Viqueque

Physical characteristics
- Source
  - location: Baucau / Viqueque border
- Mouth: Wetar Strait
  - location: Suco Lifau (Laleia)
  - coordinates: 8°29′47″S 126°09′39″E

The Laleia River (Portuguese: Ribeira de Laleia or Rio de Laleia, Tetum: Mota Laleia) is a major river in northeastern Timor-Leste. It flows north from the country's central mountains into Wetar Strait.

== Etymology ==
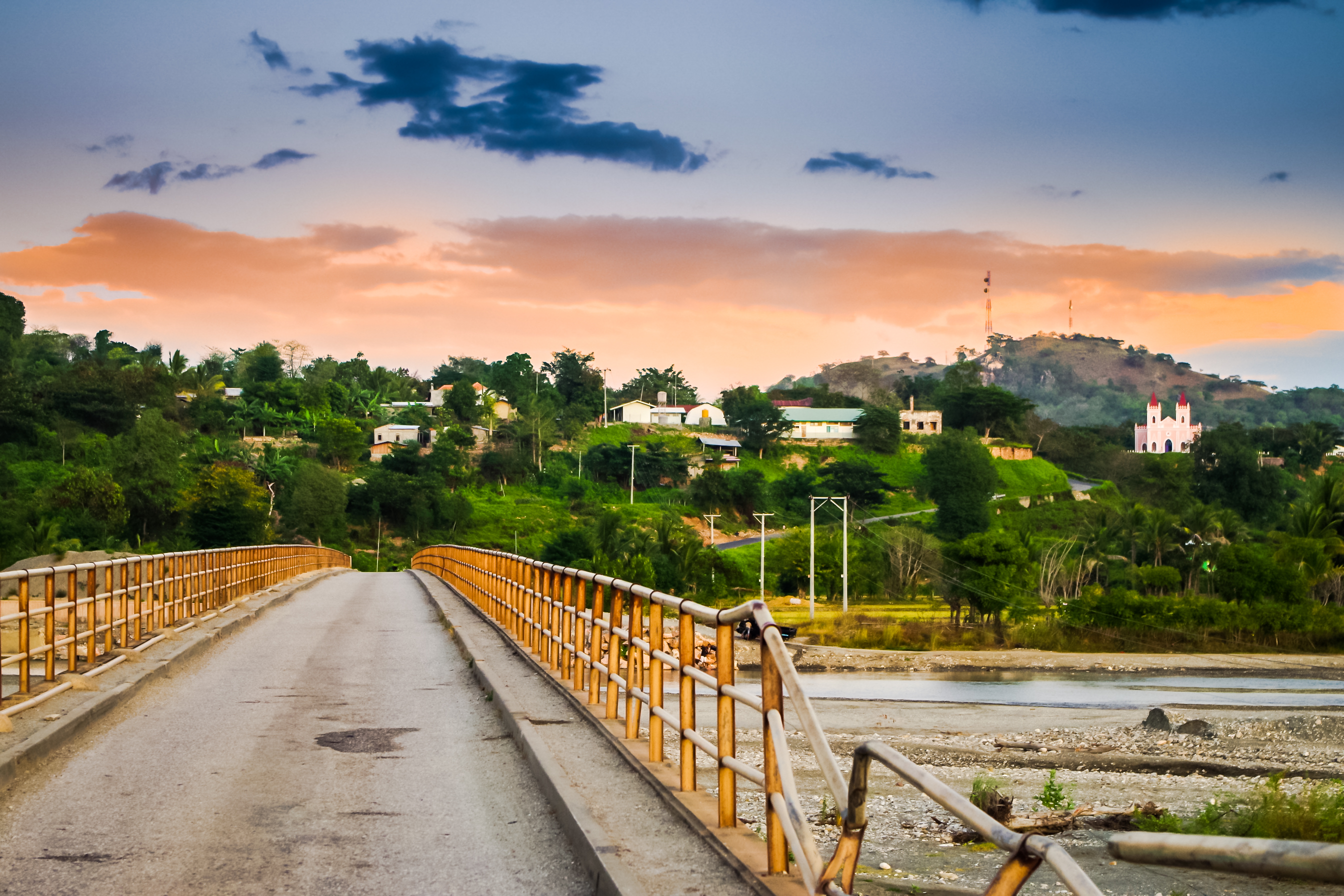
Laleia Bridge in 2014

The river shares its name with the village of Laleia (also known as Leleia or Lifau), on its left bank, a short distance south of its mouth. Extending eastwards from the village is a bridge, the Laleia Bridge, which carries National Road A01 (Dili – Com, Lautém) across the river.

Both the village and the bridge are adjacent to the border between Haturalan and Lifau, two of the three sucos of another namesake of the river, Laleia Administrative Post, Manatuto municipality (the third suco is Cairui).

According to a list prepared by Afonso de Castro, governor of the colony of Portuguese Timor from 1859 to 1863, Laleia was one of 47 kingdoms in that colony at the time.

== Course ==
The headwaters of the river are in the portion of Timor-Leste's central mountains ranging from, in the west, the westernmost parts of northern Suco Barique in Barique Administrative Post, Manatuto municipality, to, in the east, the area surrounding the border between Suco Ossouala, Vemasse Administrative Post, Baucau municipality, and Suco Liaruca, Ossu Administrative Post, Viqueque municipality.

The river itself rises in the area surrounding the border between Suco Ossouala, Vemasse Administrative Post, Baucau municipality, and Suco Liaruca, Ossu Administrative Post, Viqueque municipality. In its upper reaches, it is referred to in at least one source as the Mori River. Initially, it flows generally southwest, along or near the border between Baucau and Viqueque municipalities, to the tripoint between those two municipalities and Manatuto.

After running a short stretch further west, along the border between Manatuto and Viqueque municipalities, the river turns right and then flows generally north through Laleia Administrative Post, Manatuto. The first significant settlement it passes is Raimea, Suco Cairui, on its left bank. Further north, it passes Samalai village, northern Cairui, also on its left bank, and later Laleia village, again on its left bank, where it flows under the adjacent Laleia Bridge, both being near the border between Sucos Haturalan and Lifau, Laleia Administrative Post. A short additional distance north, it discharges into Wetar Strait, at the northern tip of the border between Suco Lifau, Laleia Administrative Post, Manatuto, and Suco Vemasse, Vemasse Administrative Post, Baucau.

The main tributaries of the river, in order of entrance, are as follows:

- Badometa River (or Badohoometa River): rises in far northern Suco Liaruca, Ossu Administrative Post, Viqueque municipality, and takes a southwestern and then western route, becoming increasingly meandering, until it enters the Laleia River near the border between Liaruca and Suco Ossouala, Vemasse Administrative Post, Baucau municipality, close to the tripoint between Sucos Ossouala, Liaruca, and a third Suco, Bibileo, Viqueque Administrative Post, Viqueque municipality;
- Bina River: a short river that rises in the southwestern corner of Suco Ossouala, Vemasse Administrative Post, Baucau, and flows southwards to enter the Laleia River at the border between Ossouala and Suco Laline, Lacluta Administrative Post, Viqueque;
- Tutoli River: rises in Suco Laline, Lacluta Administrative Post, Viqueque, and flows northwards to enter the Laleia River at the border between Laline and Suco Ossouala, Vemasse Administrative Post, Baucau; main tributaries are the Buauomeca River (or Buacomeca River) and the Letatice River;
- Abai River: rises in Suco Laline, Lacluta Administrative Post, Viqueque, and flows northwards to enter the Laleia River at the border between Laline and Suco Cairui, Laleia Administrative Post, Manatuto; main tributary is the Aihaet River;
- Caleuc River: rises near the northernmost point of the border between Suco Barique, Barique Administrative Post, Manatuto, and Suco Laline, Lacluta Administrative Post, Viqueque, and then flows northwards along that border, followed by northeast and then east along the border between Suco Cairui, Laleia Administrative Post, Manatuto, and Suco Laline, until just before the tripoint between Baucau, Manatuo, and Viqueque municipalities, where it enters the Laleia River; main tributaries are the Ladada River and the Laburaque River (or Labaraque River);
- Sorec River: rises in the northwestern corner of Suco Barique, Barique Administrative Post, Manatuto as the Haeraun River; flows northwards into Suco Cribas, Manatuto Administrative Post, Manatuto, where it becomes the Sorec River, passes over the Cribas Waterfall, and begins to meander; crosses into Suco Aiteas, Manatuto Administrative Post, Manatuto, where it turns northeast, and then east, still meandering, until, soon after reaching and then taking a short run along the border between Suco Aiteas and Suco Haturalan, Laleia Administrative Post, Manatuto, it merges with the Bueana River (see below) at the tripoint between Suco Aiteas, Suco Haturalan, and Suco Cairui, Laleia Administrative Post, Manatuto, to form the Baunoi River (see below); main tributary is the Lulic River;
- Bueana River: rises near the centre of Suco Cribas, Manatuto Administrative Post, Manatuto, as the Tuqueti River; flows generally northeasterly through that suco, begins to meander, and changes its name to Bueana River; then, after reaching and taking a short run along the border between Suco Cribas and Suco Cairui, Laleia Administrative Post, Manatuto, and later a longer run along the border between Suco Aiteas, Manatuto Administrative Post, Manatuto, and Suco Cairui, it merges with the Sorec River (see above) at the tripoint between Suco Aiteas, Suco Cairui, and Suco Haturalan, Laleia Administrative Post, Manatuto, to form the Baunoi River (see below); main tributary is the Boi River;
- Baunoi River: flows from the confluence of the Sorec and Bueana rivers (see above), initially northeastwards along the border between Sucos Haturalan and Cairui, Laleia Administrative Post, Manatuto, and then eastwards through Suco Cairui to a short distance southwest of Raimea, Suco Cairui, where it flows into the Laleia River;
- Haui River: rises in eastern Suco Cairui, Laleia Administrative Post, Manatuto, and flows generally northwards, until it enters the Laleia River just north of the border between Sucos Cairui and Haturalan, Laleia Administrative Post, Manatuto;
- Heuc River (or Heu River): rises in the northwest of Suco Haturalan, LaleiaAdministrative Post, Manatuto, and flows generally northeastwards, until it enters the Laleia River at Laleia village, on the border between Sucos Haturalan and Lifau, Laleia Administrative Post, Manatuto.

== Catchment ==
The river's catchment or drainage basin is located mainly in the municipality of Manatuto; some parts of it are in one or other of the adjacent municipalities of Baucau and Viqueque. It is about 533 km^{2} (206 sq mi) in area, with a channel length of 55 km (34 mi).

Timor-Leste has been broadly divided into twelve 'hydrologic units', groupings of climatologically and physiographically similar and adjacent river catchments. The Laleia River catchment is one of the two major catchments in the Laleia hydrologic unit, which is about 1,009.9 km^{2} (389.9 sq mi) in total area and covers 6.8% of the country; the other is the Vemasse River catchment.

== Economy ==
=== Fishing ===
A 2017 article reporting on recent archaeological analyses of Pleistocene epoch human activity at Laili cave (which overlooks the braided plain of the river) stated that shellfish "from fresh water to brackish habitats" were abundant there, and that the freshwater species had likely been gathered from the river. There were also "... at least three families of "true" crabs, derived from marine, mangrove, brackish, freshwater, and terrestrial environments."

The authors of that article also found a modest quantity of fish remains from that epoch, including remnants of freshwater eels (Anguillidae), at the cave. As there was no evidence of fishing by owls present in Timor at the time, those remains could be attributed to human consumption. However, it was thought that the fish had been caught using traps or spears, and not with fishing hooks.

Another article, published in 2023, expanded on the 2017 article by reporting on excavations at the cave in 2011 and 2019. At least 41 species of molluscs, along with crustaceans, were identified from a range of habitats including freshwater environments. Additionally, at least 10 taxa of fish were identified, of which the most abundant were the freshwater eels, mullets (Mugilidae) and needlefishes (Belonidae). According to the 2023 article, the eels "... were probably caught in the adjacent Laleia River using eel pots or nets."

In 20th and 21st century Timor-Leste, involvement in fishing has been low by comparison with other small island countries. Along the north coast of Timor, fishing levels are higher than elsewhere in the country, other than in pockets along parts of the south coast. Many of the north coast fishers fish part time or seasonally, and are otherwise occupied in additional activities such as carpentry, labouring or security work.

However, in December 2024 Deputy Prime Minister, Coordinating Minister of Social Affairs, and Minister of Rural Development and Community Housing, Mariano Sabino Lopes, led a groundbreaking ceremony for the construction of fishing sector strategic infrastructure in Laleia. The infrastructure project, first discussed during a meeting in 2013 between Prime Minister Xanana Gusmão and General Secretary of the Chinese Communist Party Xi Jinping, was to be developed by Timor South Sea Fishery Development Lda. in partnership with a Chinese company, Guanxi Yixin Fishery Development Co. Ltd.

=== Mining ===
In November 2022, the Timor-Leste government, through its Council of Ministers, approved the opening of concession areas in three rivers, including the Laleia River, for the mining of industrial minerals to be used in the production of construction materials.

Also approved in November 2022 were tender terms for the award of mining rights in the concession areas.

Each of the three rivers has abundant sediments transported from upstream in its catchment, or created by erosion of its banks. The sediments are deposited as either gravel or sand on the river's braided flood plains. After being deposited, the gravel and sand can be extracted and used primarily in the construction of small- to medium scale projects.

The Laleia River concession has a total estimated surface area of 174 ha (430 acres). It is made up of two zones, one 500 m (1,600 ft) upstream of the Laleia Bridge, and the other extending from 500 m downstream of the bridge to 500 m away from the Wetar Strait shoreline.

== See also ==
- List of rivers of Timor-Leste
