= Manatuto Administrative Post =

Administrative post in Manatuto Municipality, Timor-Leste

Manatuto
- Administrative Post
- Posto Administrativo de Manatuto (Portuguese); Postu administrativu Manatutu (Tetum)
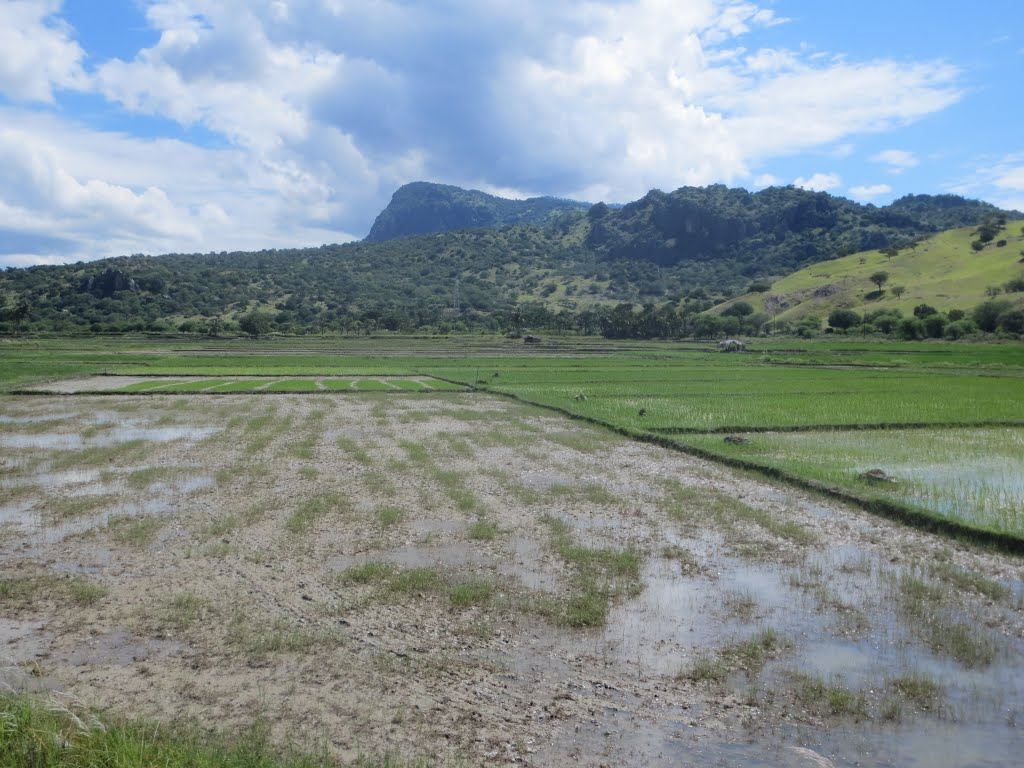
- Manatuto ricefields

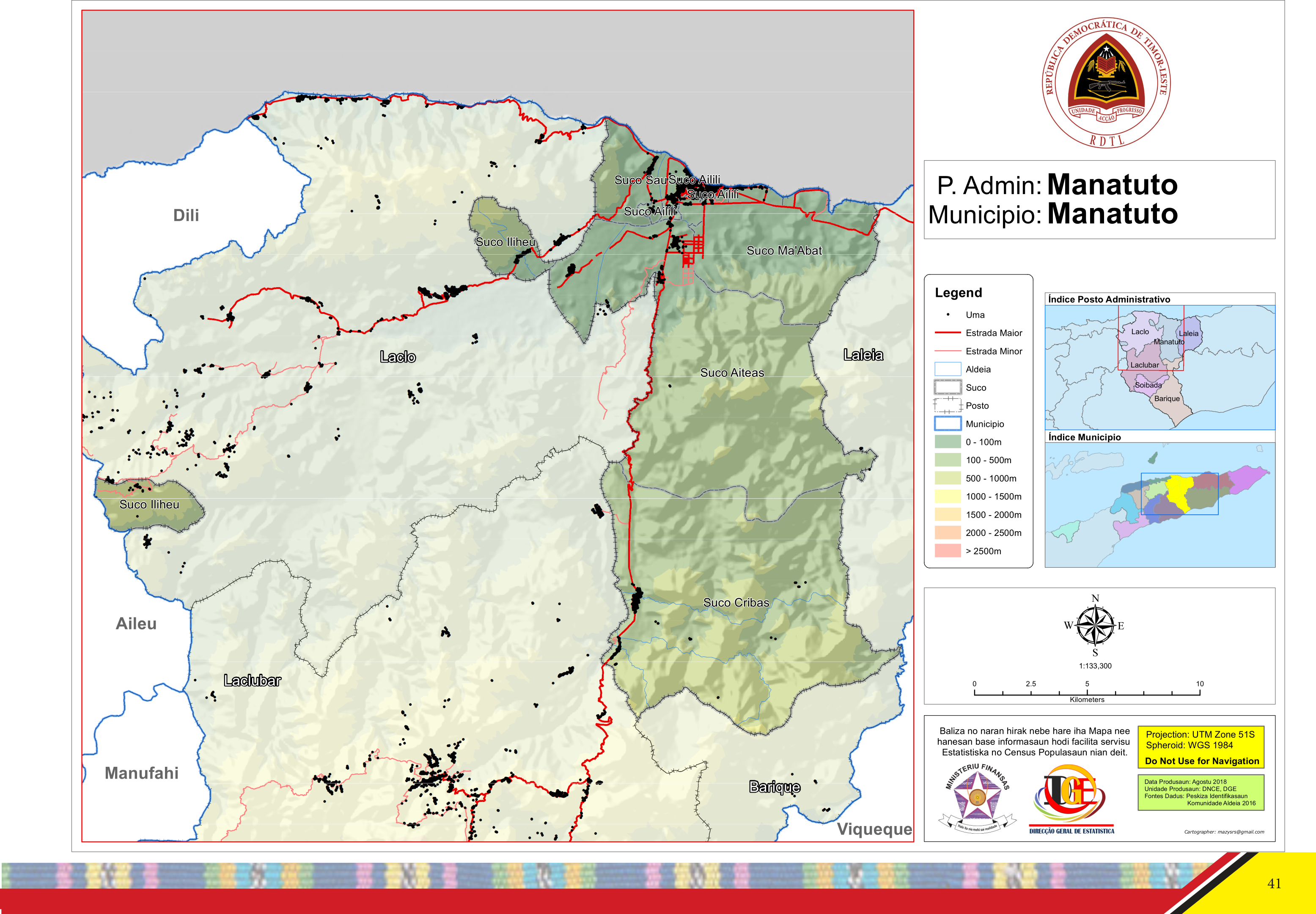
- Official map

- Location within East Timor
- Coordinates: 8°31′S 126°01′E
- Country: Timor-Leste
- Municipality: Manatuto
- Seat: Sau
- Sucos: Ailili; Aiteas; Cribas; Iliheu; Ma'abat; Sau

Area
  - Total: 345.9 km^{2} (133.6 sq mi)

Population (2015 census)
  - Total: 14,392
  - Density: 41.61/km^{2} (107.8/sq mi)

Households (2015 census)
  - Total: 2,300
- Time zone: UTC+09:00 (TLT)

Manatuto, officially Manatuto Administrative Post (Portuguese: Posto Administrativo de Manatuto, Tetum: Postu administrativu Manatutu), is an administrative post (and was formerly a subdistrict) in Manatuto municipality, Timor-Leste. Its seat or administrative centre is the suco of Sau.

The administrative post with 10,449 inhabitants (Census 2004) is divided in six Sucos: Ailili, Aiteas, Cribas, Iliheu, Ma'abat, and Sau. The local dialect is Galoli though Tetum is widely known.

Climate

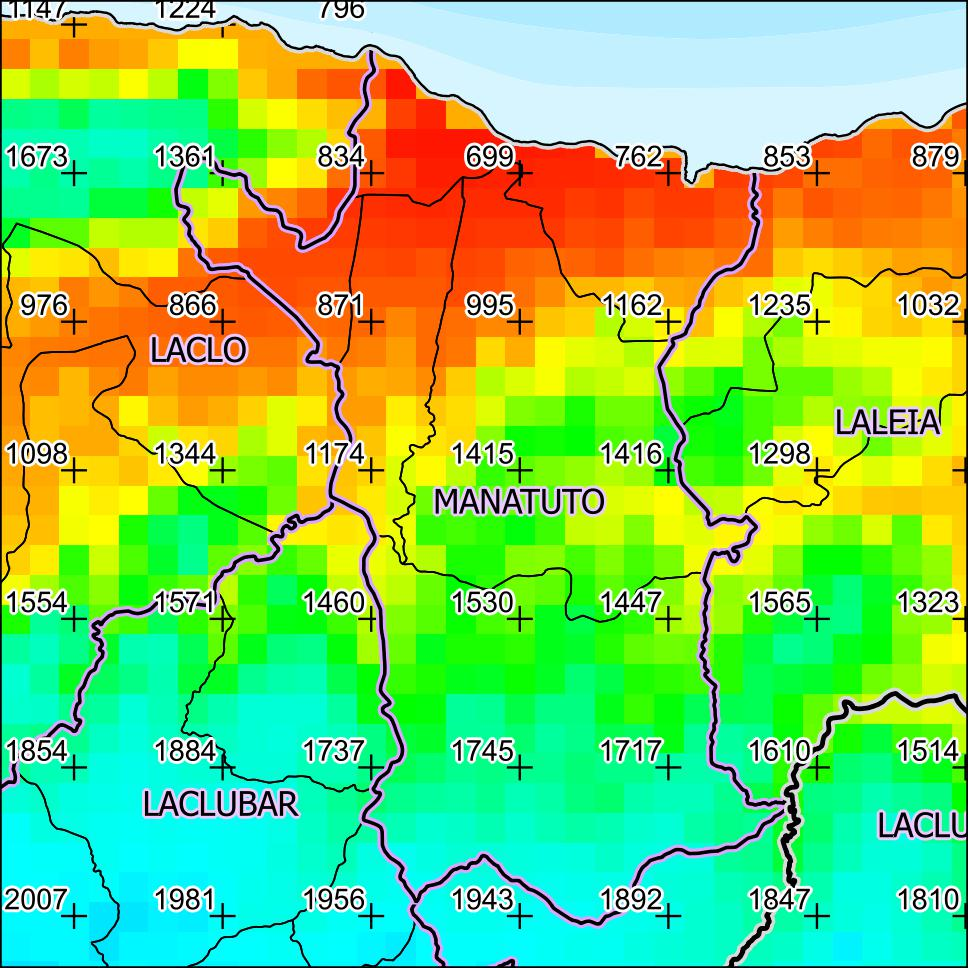
Annual rainfall (2000)

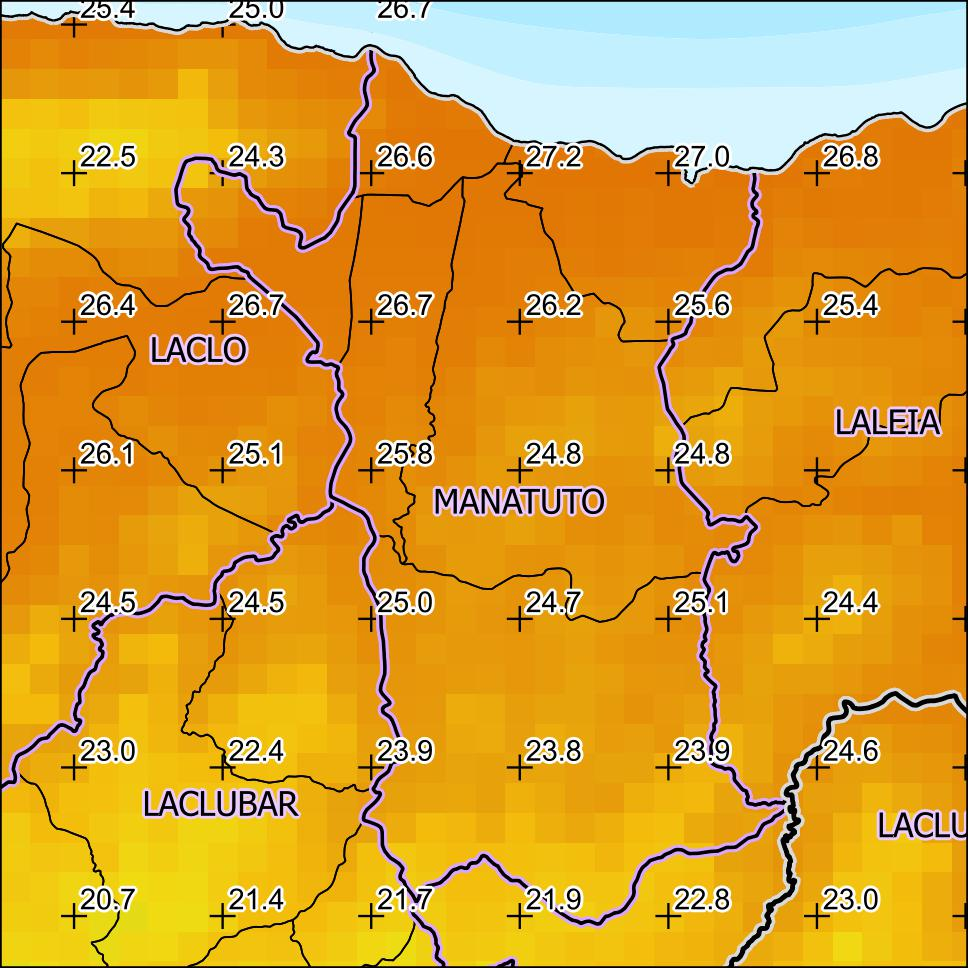
Temperature (2000)

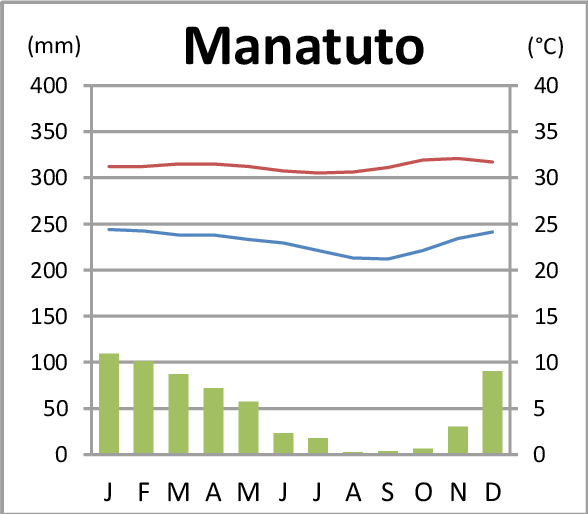
Town of Manatuto
