= Laclo Administrative Post =

Administrative post in Manatuto Municipality, Timor-Leste

Laclo
- Administrative Post
- Posto Administrativo de Laclo (Portuguese); Postu administrativu Lakló (Tetum)
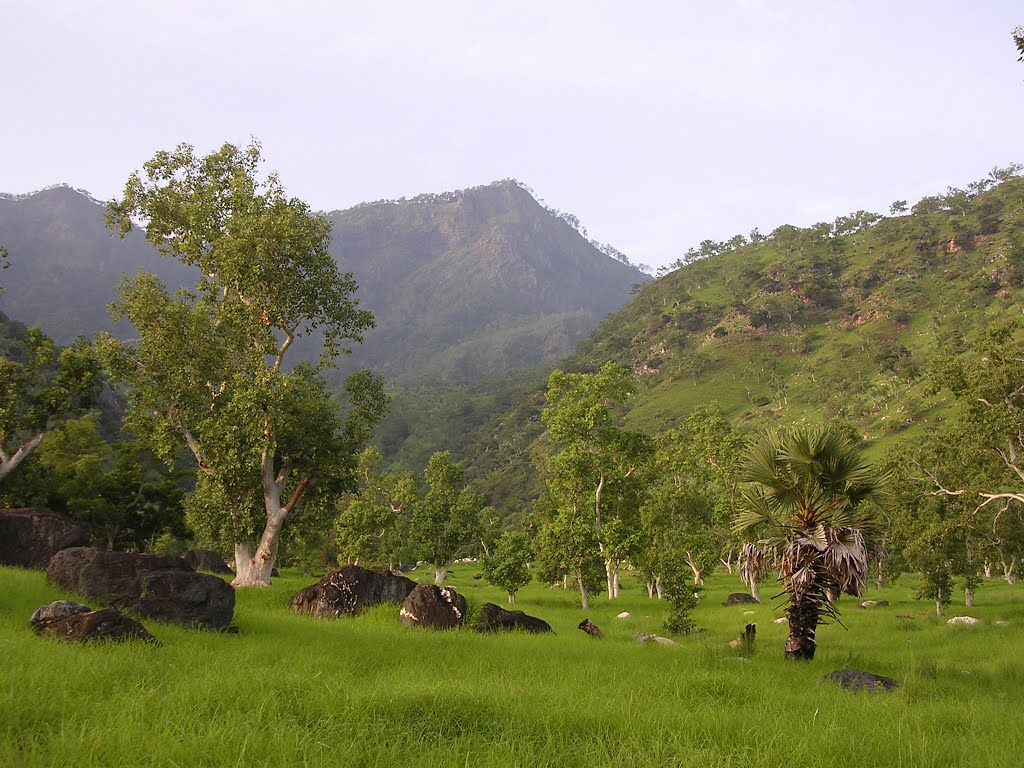
- Landscape at Subau, Uma Caduac

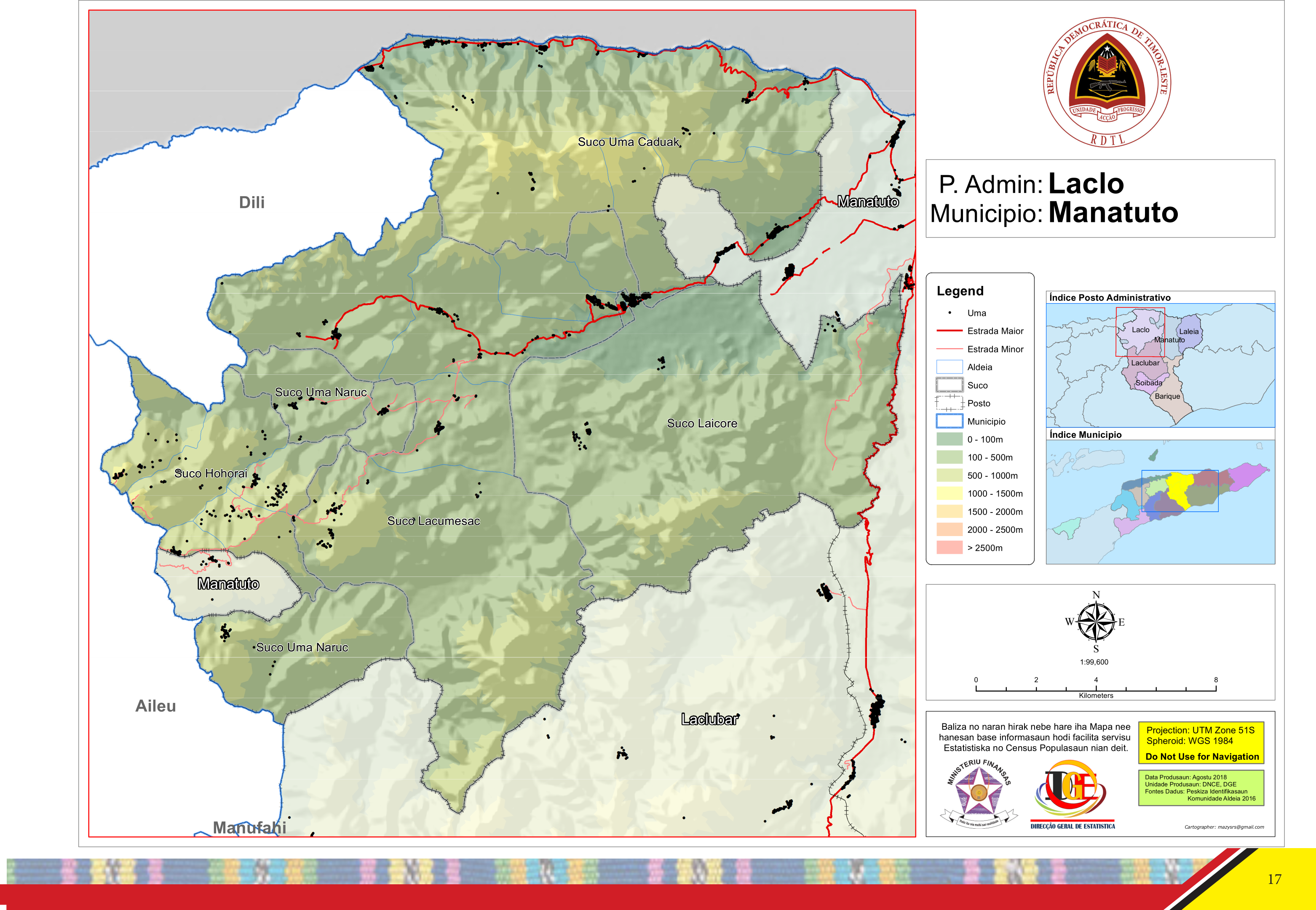
- Official map

- Location within East Timor
- Coordinates: 8°33′S 125°55′E
- Country: Timor-Leste
- Municipality: Manatuto
- Seat: Uma Caduac
- Sucos: Hohorai; Lacumesac; Laicore; Uma Caduac; Uma Naruc

Area
  - Total: 283.3 km^{2} (109.4 sq mi)

Population (2015 census)
  - Total: 7,756
  - Density: 27.38/km^{2} (70.91/sq mi)

Households (2015 census)
  - Total: 1,237
- Time zone: UTC+09:00 (TLT)

Laclo, officially Laclo Administrative Post (Portuguese: Posto Administrativo de Laclo, Tetum: Postu administrativu Lakló), is an administrative post (and was formerly a subdistrict) in Manatuto municipality, Timor-Leste. Its seat or administrative centre is Uma Caduac, and its population at the 2004 census was 7,558.
