= List of rivers of Timor-Leste =

This is a list of rivers in Timor-Leste. The list is arranged by catchment, drainage basin or watershed from west to east, with respective tributaries indented under each larger stream's name.

== Overview ==
Lakes and rivers of Timor-Leste

Timor-Leste has over 100 rivers arising in its highlands and discharging into its coastal zone. The country also has 29 main river systems – 12 in its north and 17 in its south. As the island of Timor is small and Timor-Leste's topography is steep, the rivers are short and drain quickly, with fast flowing discharges.

Almost all of Timor-Leste's creeks and rivers originate in its central mountain range or ridge, which dominates the country. The mountain range extends from Tatamailau, or Tata Mailau, sometimes referred as Mount Ramelau (2,963 m (9,721 ft)) in the west to the Fuiloro Plateau in the east, and includes Ira Lalaro (318 m (1,043 ft)), the country's largest lake. A drainage divide trends along it, approximately from southwest to northeast; rain falling north of the divide flows northwards, and that falling to its south drains southwards.

The country's rainfall has distinct seasonal variability affected by the West Pacific Monsoon (WPM). Maximum precipitation occurs only in the high elevations of the mountain range. The northern coast is drier than its southern counterpart.

Very few of Timor-Leste's rivers flow perennially, because the country is narrow from north to south, and has steep terrain and infrequent rain. Most of the rivers have short courses, are dry most of the year, and are not navigable. In the dry season, the ephemeral rivers often form pools of stagnant water. The south has more perennial rivers than the north because of its larger catchment areas, longer rainy season, greater rainfall and prevailing winds. According to a Timor-Leste Water Sector Assessment and Roadmap published by The World Bank in 2018:

"The monsoon climate results in highly variable river flows from wet season peaks and flash floods to low or no dry season flows. Along the northern coastline are many of the smaller river catchments that are either semi-permanent or ephemeral, flowing for short periods in the wet season after heavy rainfall events. This contrasts with the south coast where the bimodal wet seasons and higher rainfall has resulted in many large permanent rivers that have high peak flows in the wet season, which are reduced to the base flow during the dry season. At all times, subsurface flows occur below the gravel and cobblestone riverbeds of most rivers, and in the dry season, this can represent the primary flows within a river, particularly in lowland areas."

During periods of greater precipitation, the rivers in the south cannot accommodate the whole of their flow, and therefore overspill into coastal swamps and lagoons known as coilões.

On the north coast, most rivers are choked with nearshore gravel, and there are few deltas. The reason is that the offshore gradient, into either Ombai Strait or Wetar Strait, is very steep, with the consequence that sediment that flows offshore is deposited in deep water. On the south coast, where the offshore gradient into the Timor Sea is much gentler, deltas are common.

Many of Timor-Leste's rivers are polluted by sewage released from homes and light industrial premises, due to a lack of basic sanitation. Additionally, the majority of the population uses river water for washing clothes, bathing and other domestic uses, and thus promotes the spread of diseases.

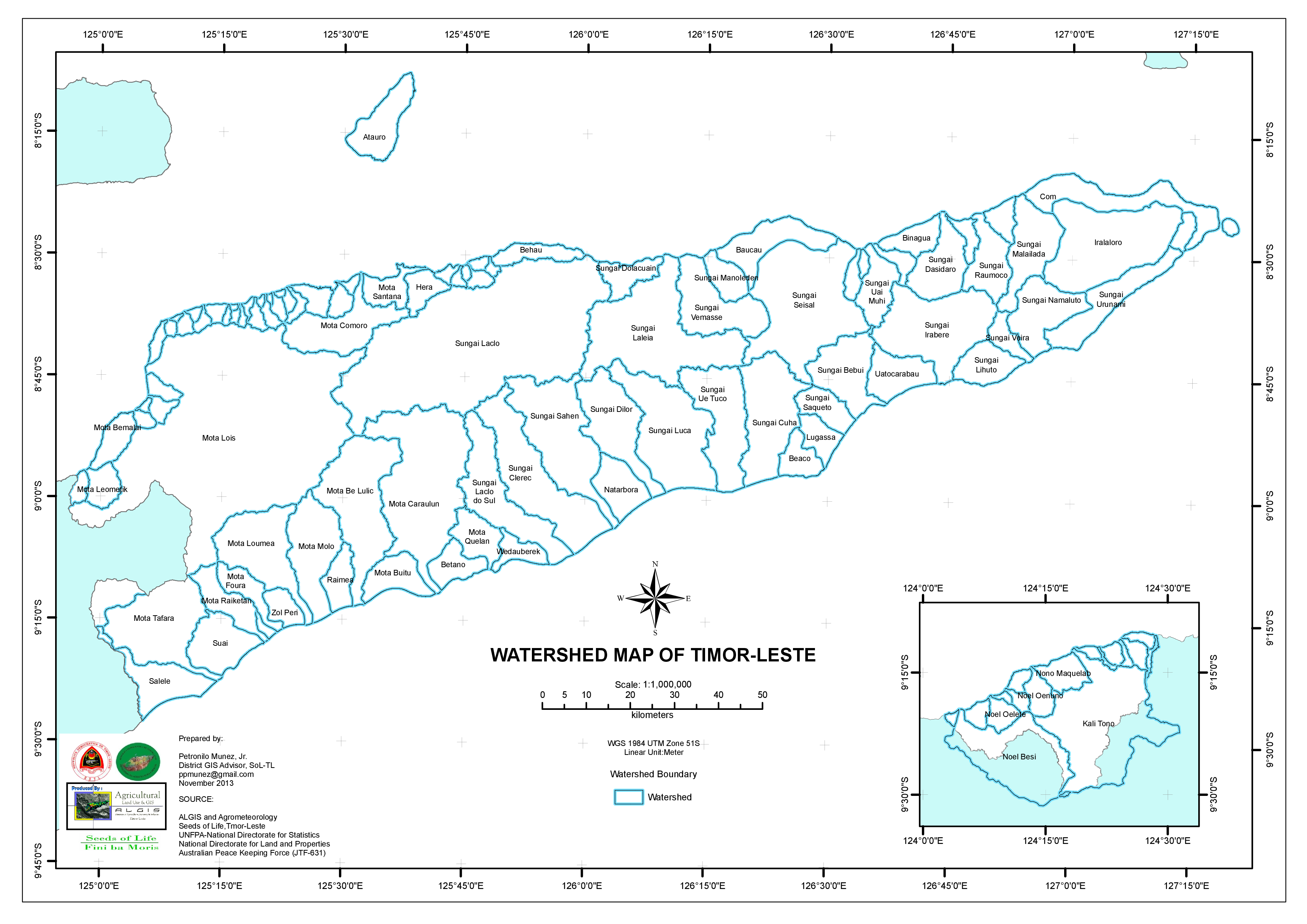
Watersheds of Timor-Leste

The country has been broadly divided into twelve 'hydrologic units', groupings of climatologically and physiographically similar and adjacent river catchments, drainage basins or watersheds. Each hydrologic unit is made up of a number of rivers. In total, there are 29 main river systems in Timor-Leste – 12 in the north and 17 in the south.

Timor-Leste's longest river is the North Laclo, at about 80 km (50 mi) long; its largest catchment is that of the Loes, which has a total area of 2,184 km^{2} (843 sq mi) (almost 15% of the whole country), about 9% of which lies in Indonesia.

The people of Timor-Leste often have no single common name for, or any single spelling of any name allocated to, a particular river. Further, an East Timorese river may change its name several times between its source and its mouth. The names set out below are therefore not necessarily authoritative, either as to the name of a river, or as to the spelling of any particular name.

== North coast ==
- Leometik River
- Fatumolin River
- Berita River
- Loes River (Rio de Lois)
  - Lauveli River
    - Dikasbata River
    - Emderilua River
    - Gumuloa River
    - Dirobatelau River
    - Manobira River
    - Curiho River
    - Gleno River
      - Goumeca River
        - Buro River
      - Roumetalena River
      - Maurotieramata River
      - Aileu River
  - Marobo River
    - Manusama River
      - Gamerama River
      - Lahora River
      - Bapera River
    - Celere River
    - Garai River
      - Aiboro River
      - Ladibau River
    - Magapu River
      - Baluani River
    - Aimera River
    - Boroulo River
    - Babonasolan River
    - Babalai River
  - Bebai River (Rio de Lois) (Nunutura River) (Nunura River)
    - Claola River
    - Hatoleai River
    - Hatopoci River
      - Timoreme River
    - Meuculi River
    - Bulobo River
    - Matenua River
    - Sasso River
    - Laecouken River (Loilara River)
    - Talau River (Taipui River)
      - Merak River
    - Malibacu River
- Marae River
- Bahonu River
- Palua River
- Malukai River
- Palapu River
- Laklo River
- Gularloa River
- Carbutaeloa River
- Moraeloa River
- Comoro River
  - Bemos River
  - Boera River
- Santana River
- Erseic River
- Lobain River
- Aiscahe River
- North Laclo River (Lacló do Norte)
  - Sumasse River
    - Bobo River
  - Coi River
  - Ulahu River
  - Lihobani River (Libania River)
    - Ueseic River
    - Hatossi River
  - Mutoko River
  - Lolun River
  - Aimaleum River
  - Noru River
    - Coumai River
  - Hatoarabau River
  - Marenu River (Orlaquru River)
  - Karama River
  - Daisoli River
  - Manufonihun River (North Laclo River)
    - Manolane River
- Dolacuain River
- Laleia River
  - Baunoi River
    - Bueana River
    - Sorec River
  - Caleuc River
  - Abai River
  - Tutoli River
  - Mori River
- Vemasse River
- Manuleiden River
- Seiçal River
  - Cainame River
  - Salubada River
    - Cassaquiar River
  - Sauma River
  - Buihiu River
- Borouai River
- Lianau River
- Uaimuhi River
- Lequinamo River
- Laivai River (Dasidara River)
- Buiguira River
- Raumoco River
- Malailada River

== South coast ==
- Masin River
- Tafara River
  - Maubui River
    - Nanamauk River
- Kamanasa River
  - Karautun River
  - Nabuk River
- Raiketan River
- Foura River
- Loumea River
  - Pa River (Mauzope River)
  - Laco River
- Mola River
  - Fatoro River
- Belulik River
  - Buronuno River
    - Sarai River
- Caraulun River
  - Aiasa River
  - Sui River
- Quelun River
- South Laclo River (Lacló do Sul)
  - Clerec River
  - Marak River
- Sahen River
  - Laniara River
- Dilor River
  - Culacao River
- Luca River
- Tuco River
- Cuha River
  - Lee River
- Bebui River
- Metauai River
- Irabere River
  - Calicidere River
  - Oulauai River
  - Boro River
- Veira River
- Namaluto River
  - Tchino River
- Vero River

== Oecusse ==
- Noel Besi River
- Tono River
  - Abanal River
  - Kinloki River
  - Ekai River
  - Columu River
