= Soibada Administrative Post =

Administrative post in Manatuto Municipality, Timor-Leste

Soibada
- Administrative Post
- Posto Administrativo de Soibada (Portuguese); Postu administrativu Soibada (Tetun)
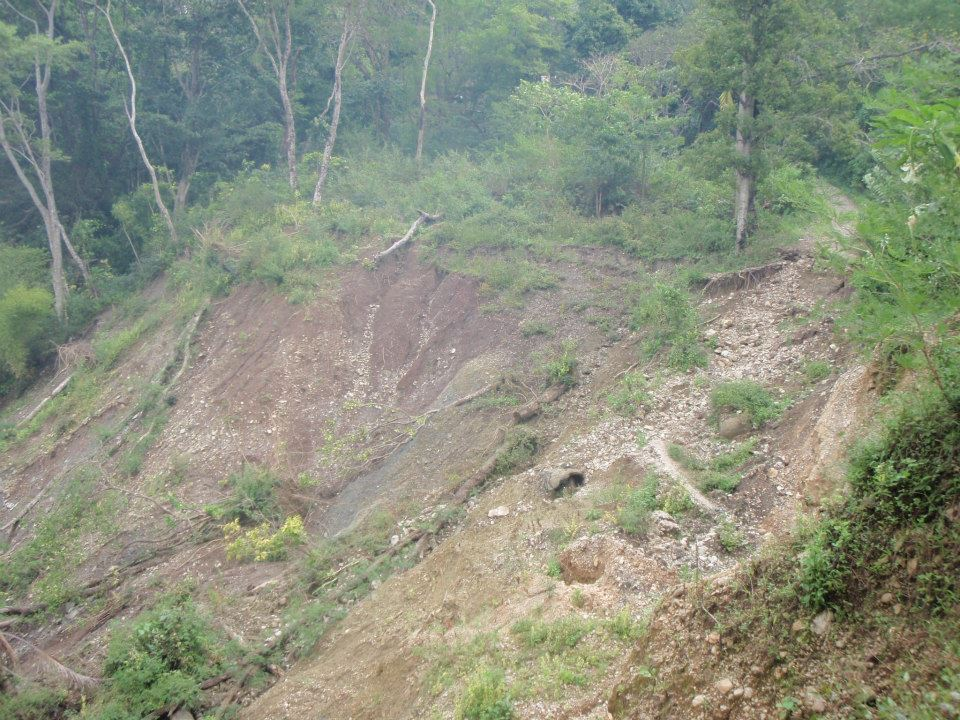

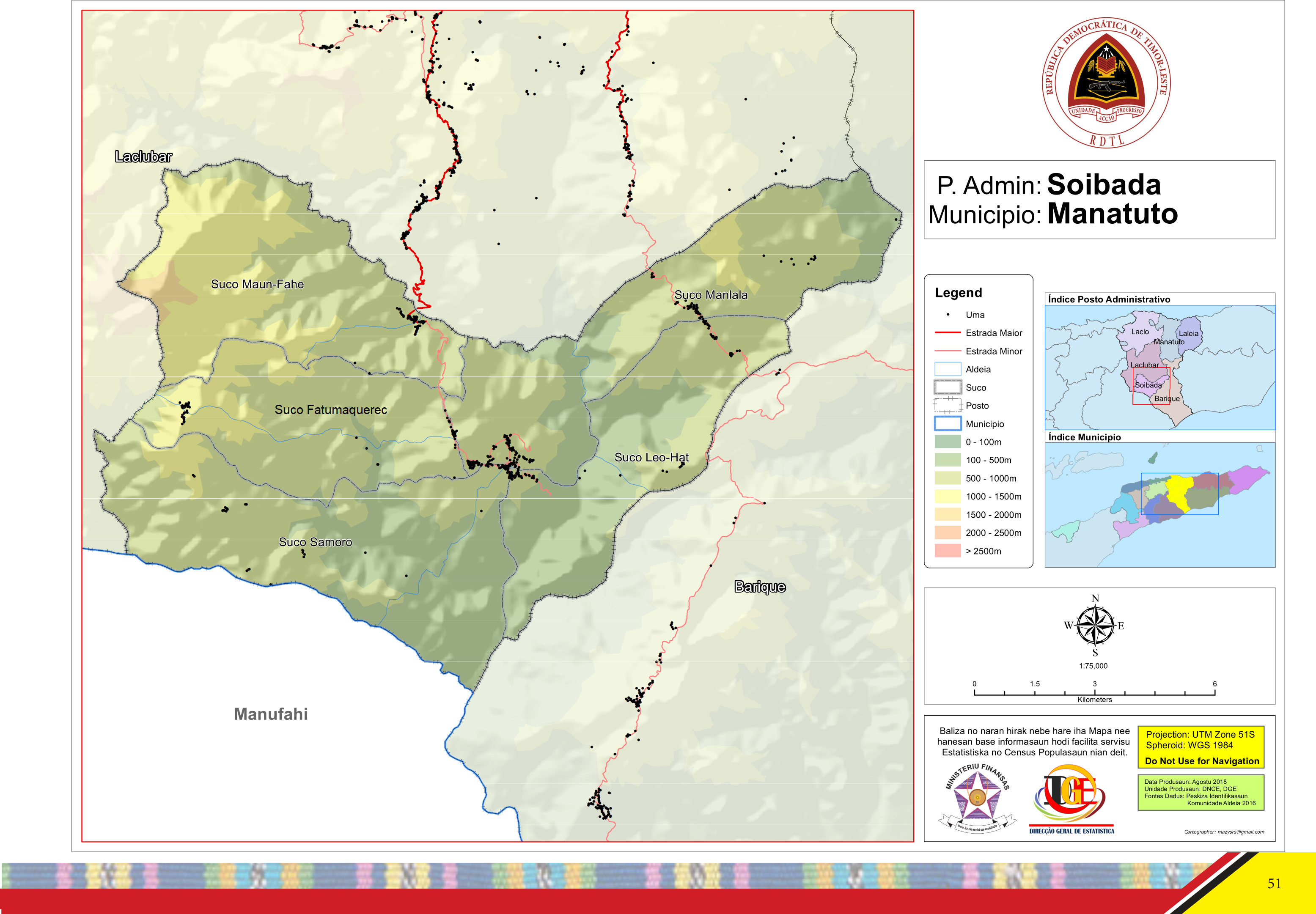
- Official map

- Location within East Timor
- Coordinates: 8°52′S 125°56′E
- Country: Timor-Leste
- Municipality: Manatuto
- Seat: Samoro
- Sucos: Fatumaquerec; Leo-Hat; Manlala; Maun-Fahe; Samoro

Area
  - Total: 130.0 km^{2} (50.2 sq mi)

Population (2015 census)
  - Total: 3,294
  - Density: 25.34/km^{2} (65.63/sq mi)

Households (2015 census)
  - Total: 486
- Time zone: UTC+09:00 (TLT)

Soibada, officially Soibada Administrative Post (Portuguese: Posto Administrativo de Soibada, Tetun: Postu administrativu Soibada), is an administrative post (and was formerly a subdistrict) in Manatuto municipality, Timor-Leste. Its seat or administrative centre is Samoro.
