= Barique Administrative Post =

Administrative post in Manatuto Municipality, Timor-Leste

Barique
- Administrative Post
- Posto Administrativo de Barique (Portuguese); Postu administrativu Barike (Tetum)
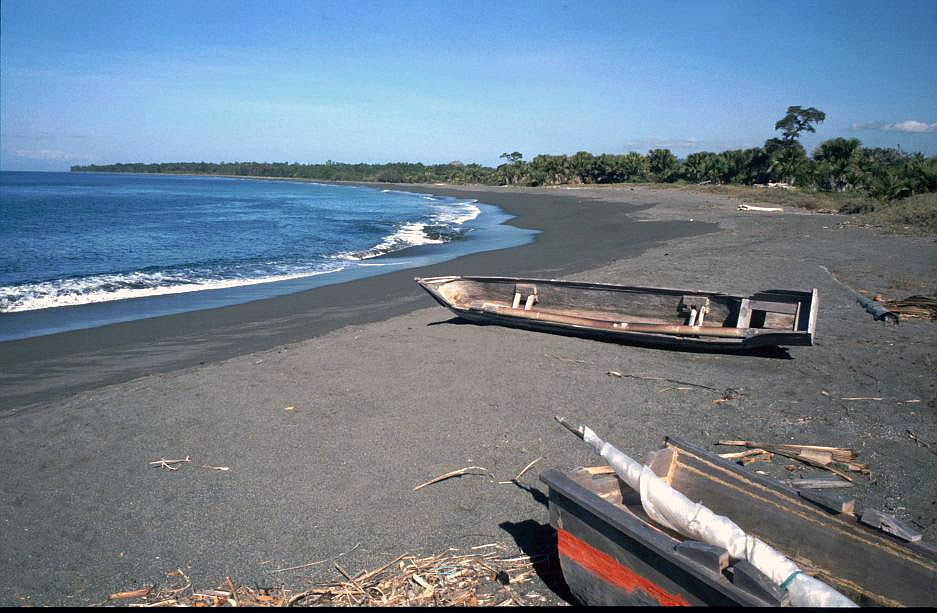
- Beach at Natarbora

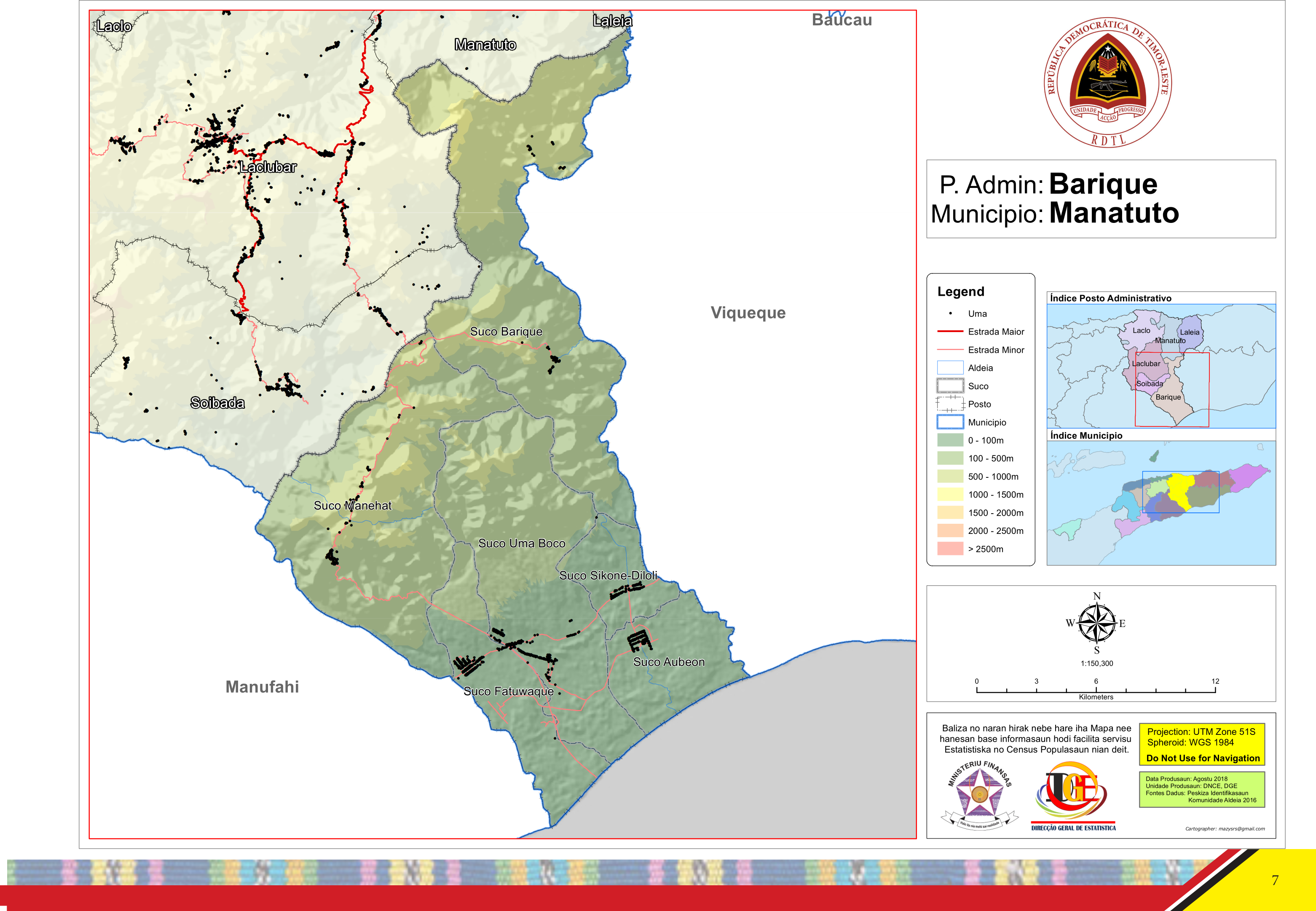
- Official map

- Location within East Timor
- Coordinates: 8°50′S 126°04′E
- Country: Timor-Leste
- Municipality: Manatuto
- Seat: Uma Boco
- Sucos: Aubeon; Barique; Fatuwaque; Manehat; Sikone-Diloli; Uma Boco

Area
  - Total: 398.3 km^{2} (153.8 sq mi)

Population (2015 census)
  - Total: 5,438
  - Density: 13.65/km^{2} (35.36/sq mi)

Households (2015 census)
  - Total: 951
- Time zone: UTC+09:00 (TLT)

Barique (formerly Barique/Natarbora), officially Barique Administrative Post (Portuguese: Posto Administrativo de Barique, Tetum: Postu administrativu Barike), is an administrative post (and was formerly a subdistrict) in Manatuto municipality, Timor-Leste. Its seat or administrative centre is the town of Uma Boco in the suco of Uma Boco, and its population at the 2004 census was 4,781.
