= Manatuto =

- City
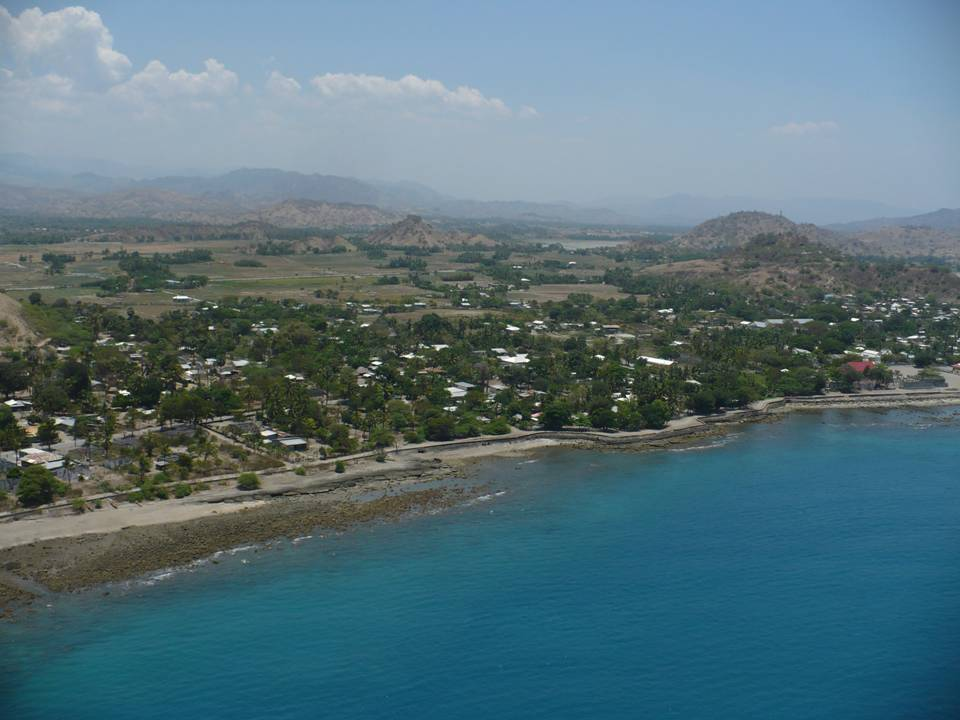

- Location in Timor-Leste
- Coordinates: 8°30′44″S 126°00′57″E
- Country: Timor-Leste
- Municipality: Manatuto
- Administrative post: Manatuto

Area
  - Total: 271.38 km^{2} (104.78 sq mi)
- Elevation: 0 m (0 ft)

Population (2010)
  - Total: 3,692
  - Density: 13.60/km^{2} (35.24/sq mi)
- Time zone: UTC+09:00 (TLT)
- Climate: BSh

Manatuto is a city in Manatuto Municipality, Timor-Leste.

Manatuto Vila has 3,692 inhabitants (Census 2015) and is capital of the subdistrict and district Manatuto. It is on the north coast of Timor, 64 km (40 mi) (about 50 km (31 mi) as the crow flies) east of Dili, the national capital, on the way to Baucau. The capital is known for its salt production and abundance of tamarind.

== Geography ==
Manatuto city is generally flat and low-lying, with single hills on its southern outskirts. It extends for approximately 6 km (3.7 mi) from the eastern end of Obrato aldeia in Suco Sau to the western end of the Maabat aldeia in Suco Maabat. It also stretches about 2 km (1.2 mi) south from Wetar Strait in its north.

Dumi Huhun (156 m (512 ft) AMSL), in the city's southeast near the main road connecting Dili and Baucau, is the tallest of its hills. Another hill, Saututu Hill (90 m (300 ft) AMSL), is on the eastern side of the city, along the road connecting Manatuto and the small community of Carlilu to its south.

== Governance ==
The city is the capital of Manatuto municipality, and is made up of four urban sucos. From west to east, the sucos are: Sau, Ailili, Aiteas, and Maabat. According to the 2010 census, urban sucos are those co-located with municipal capitals, or with certain qualities of population and social amenities. In the case of Manatuto, the city is in effect the urbanised part of the four sucos.

Manatuto suffered an excessive amount of damage and high murder rate in 1999 compared to other locations. The town is still being re-built.

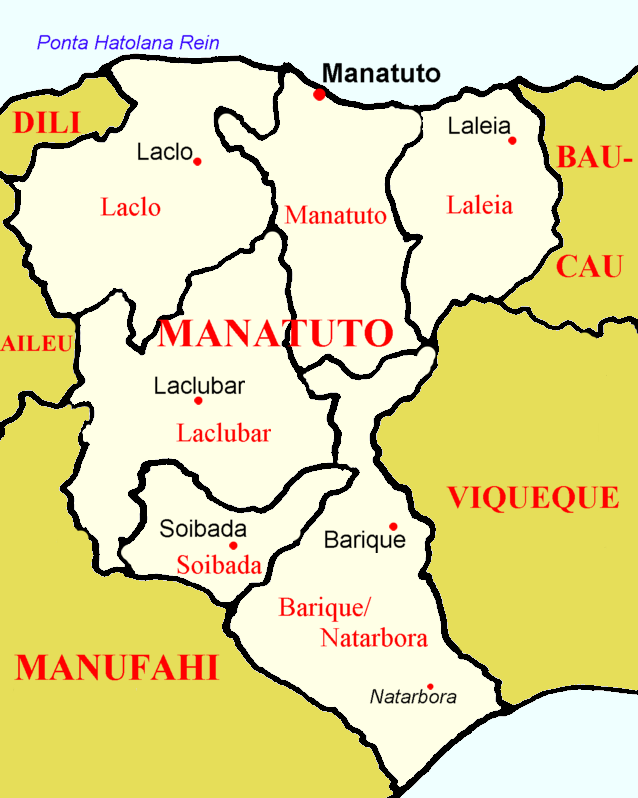
Map of Manatuto district

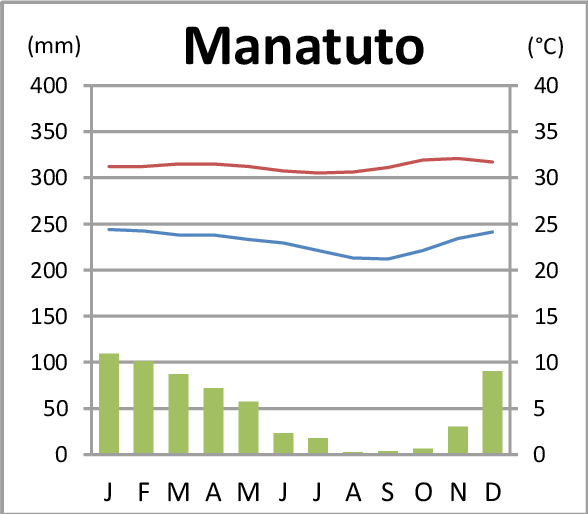
Climate
