= Laleia Administrative Post =

Administrative post in Manatuto Municipality, Timor-Leste

Laleia
- Administrative Post
- Posto Administrativo de Laleia (Portuguese); Postu administrativu Laleia (Tetum)
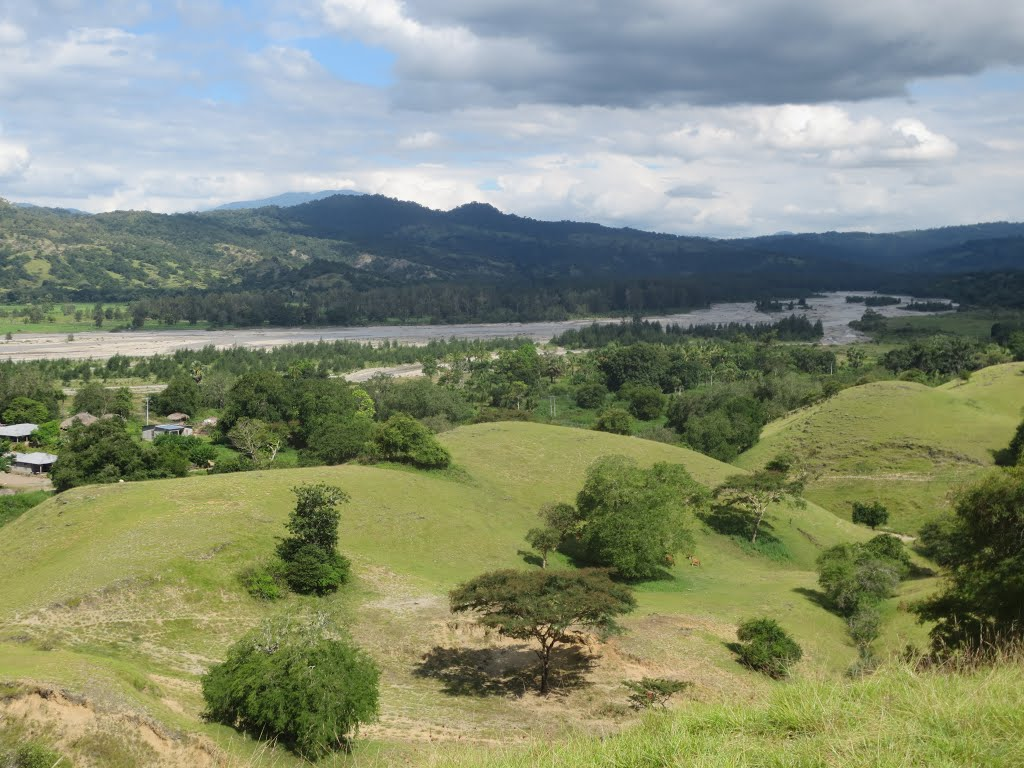
- View of the Laleia River

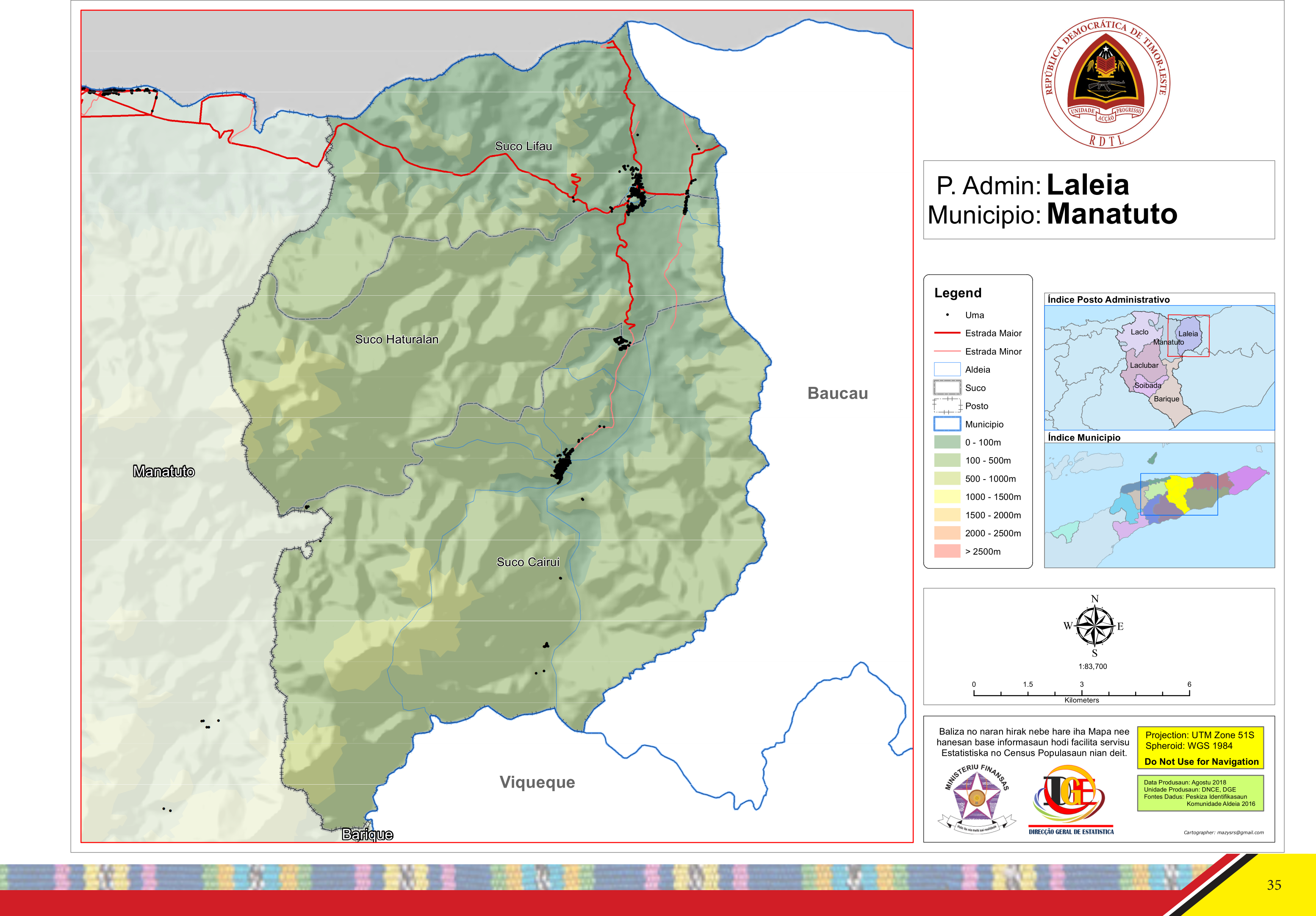
- Official map

- Location within East Timor
- Coordinates: 8°32′S 126°10′E
- Country: Timor-Leste
- Municipality: Manatuto
- Seat: Haturalan
- Sucos: Cairui; Haturalan; Lifau

Area
  - Total: 226.1 km^{2} (87.3 sq mi)

Population (2015 census)
  - Total: 3,689
  - Density: 16.32/km^{2} (42.26/sq mi)

Households (2015 census)
  - Total: 719
- Time zone: UTC+09:00 (TLT)

Laleia, officially Laleia Administrative Post (Portuguese: Posto Administrativo de Laleia, Tetum: Postu administrativu Laleia), is an administrative post (and was formerly a subdistrict) in Manatuto municipality, Timor-Leste. Its seat or administrative centre is Haturalan.

According to a list prepared by Afonso de Castro, governor of the colony of Portuguese Timor from 1859 to 1863, Laleia was one of 47 kingdoms in that colony at the time.

== Born ==
- Xanana Gusmão (1946), president and prime minister of Timor-Leste
