= Manatuto Municipality =

Municipality of East Timor

Manatuto
- Municipality of Timor-Leste
- Município Manatuto (Portuguese); Munisípiu Manatutu (Tetun)
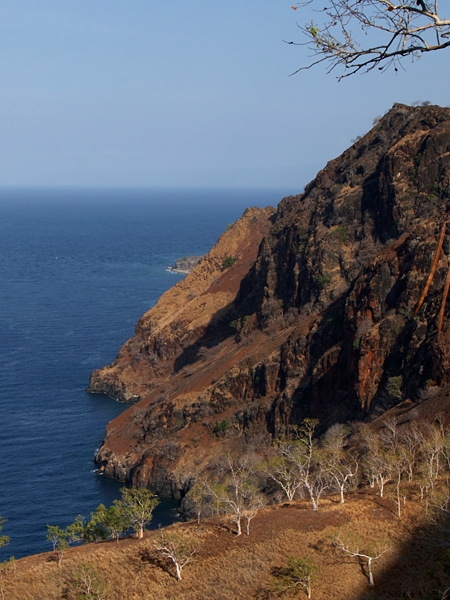
- Cliffs at Manatuto

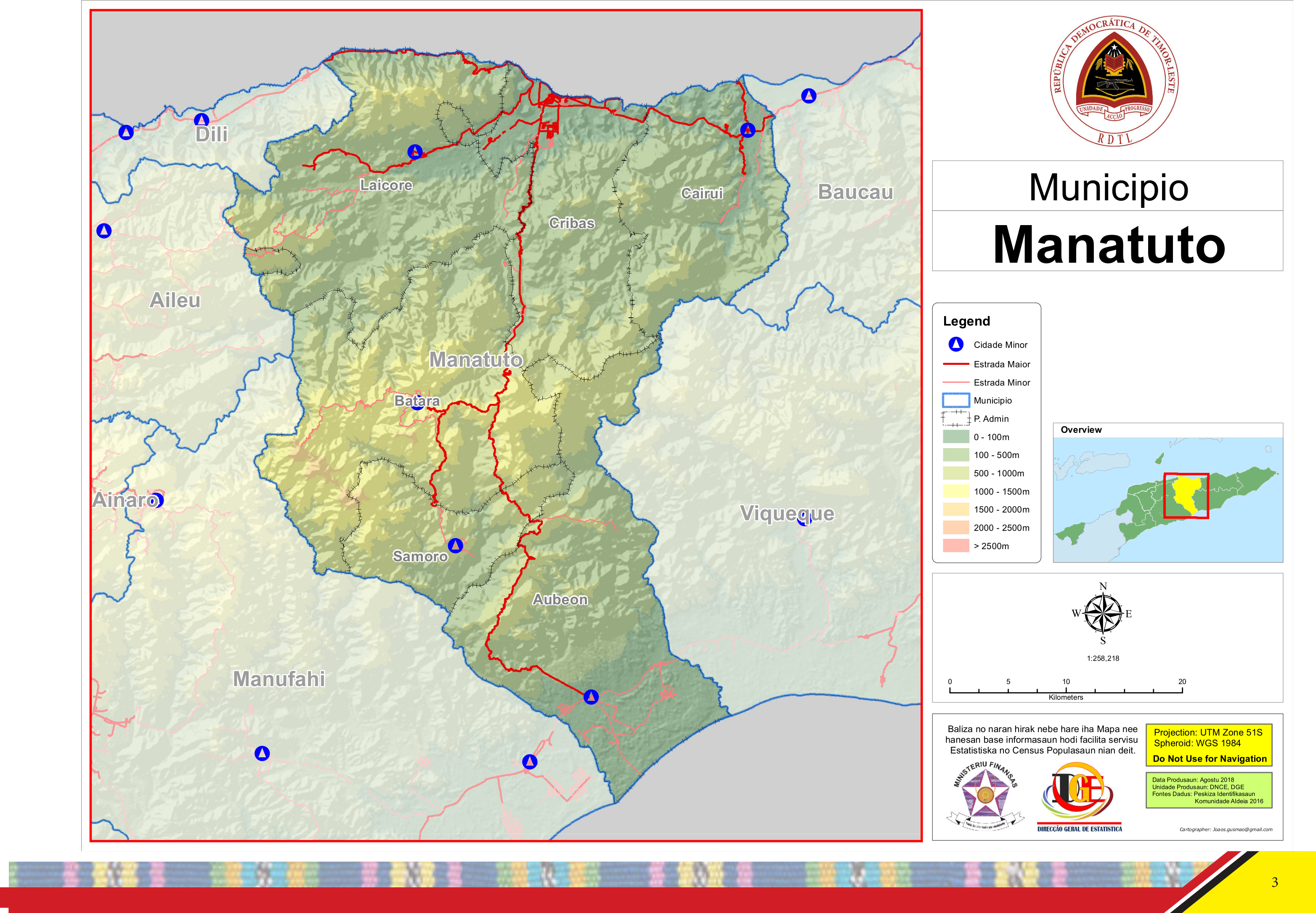
- Official map

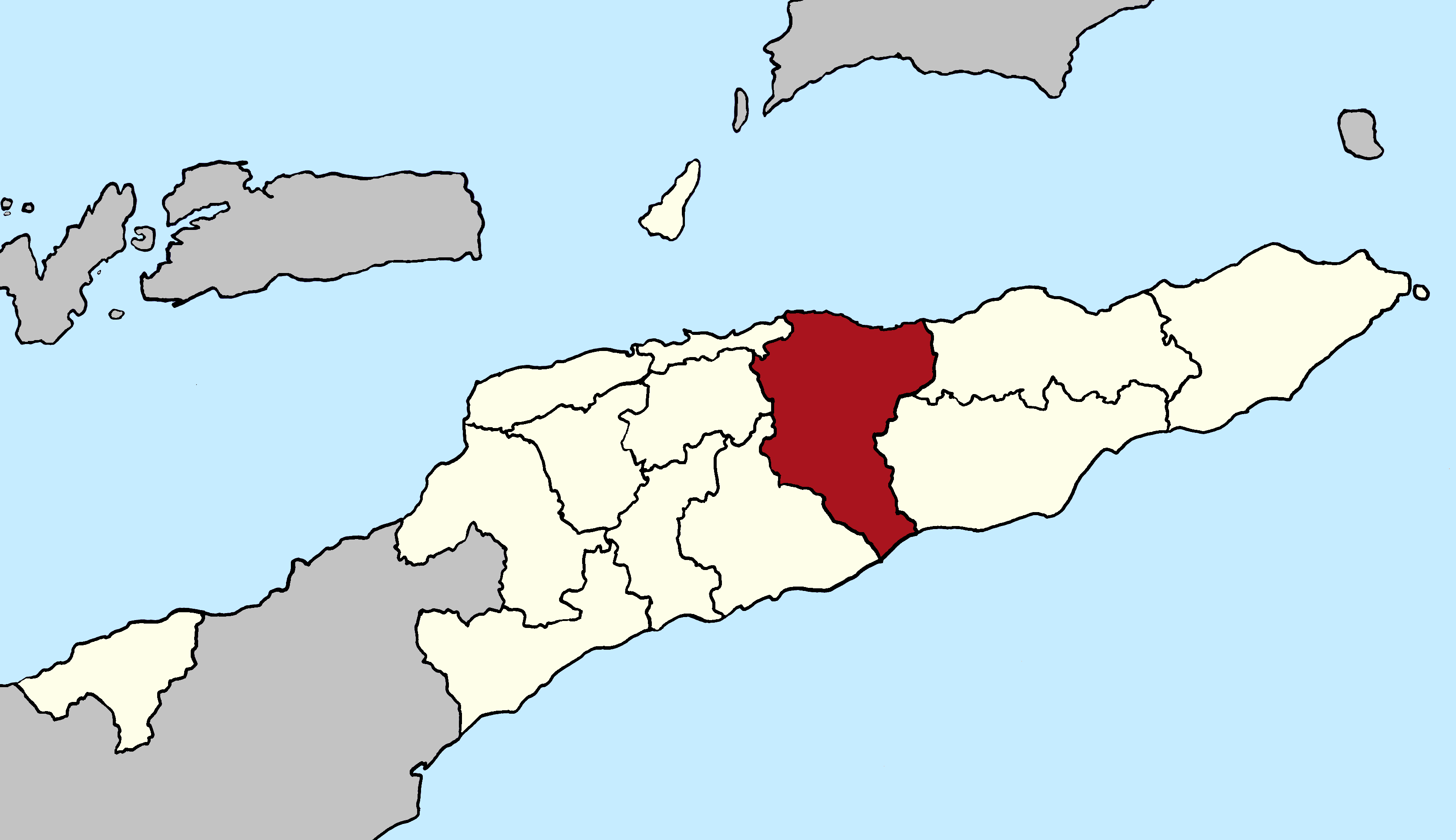
- Manatuto in Timor-Leste
- Interactive map of Manatuto
- Coordinates: 8°42′S 125°55′E
- Country: Timor-Leste
- Capital: Manatuto
- Administrative posts: Barique-Natarbora; Laclo; Laclubar; Laleia; Manatuto; Soibada

Area
  - Total: 1,783.3 km^{2} (688.5 sq mi)
  - Rank: 2nd

Population (2015 census)
  - Total: 46,619
  - Rank: 13th
  - Density: 26.142/km^{2} (67.707/sq mi)
  - Rank: 13th

Households (2015 census)
  - Total: 7,467
  - Rank: 12th
- Time zone: UTC+09:00 (TLT)
- ISO 3166 code: TL-MT
- HDI (2017): 0.614 medium · 5th
- Website: Manatuto Municipality

Manatuto (Portuguese: Município Manatuto, Tetun: Munisípiu Manatutu) is one of the municipalities (formerly districts) of Timor-Leste, located in the central part of the country. It has a population of 45,541 (Census 2010) and an area of 1,783.3 km^{2}. The capital of the municipality is also named Manatuto. It is the least populated municipality of Timor-Leste.

== Toponymy ==
The word Manatuto has been said to be a Portuguese approximation of the local Tetun and Galoli language word Manatutu, which means 'pecking birds'.

According to another source, the word is a portmanteau of the Tetun words Mana and tutu, which mean 'old woman' and 'peak' or 'summit', respectively. The legend goes that two groups of people were each living on the summit of a hill, one of them named Sau Raha (now Soraha) and the other Sau Lor (now Saulidun). The two groups were engaged separately in their own daily activities, but each was accompanied by one of two Liurai, who were brothers.

== Geography ==
The borders of the municipality of Manatuto are identical to those of the council of Portuguese Timor with the same name.

The municipality borders the municipalities of Baucau and Viqueque to the east and Manufahi, Aileu, and Dili to the west. It reaches both the south and north coasts of the island and is only one of two municipalities to do so (the other is Lautém in the far east), and has the most geographical diversity. To the north is the Strait of Wetar, to the south is the Timor Sea.

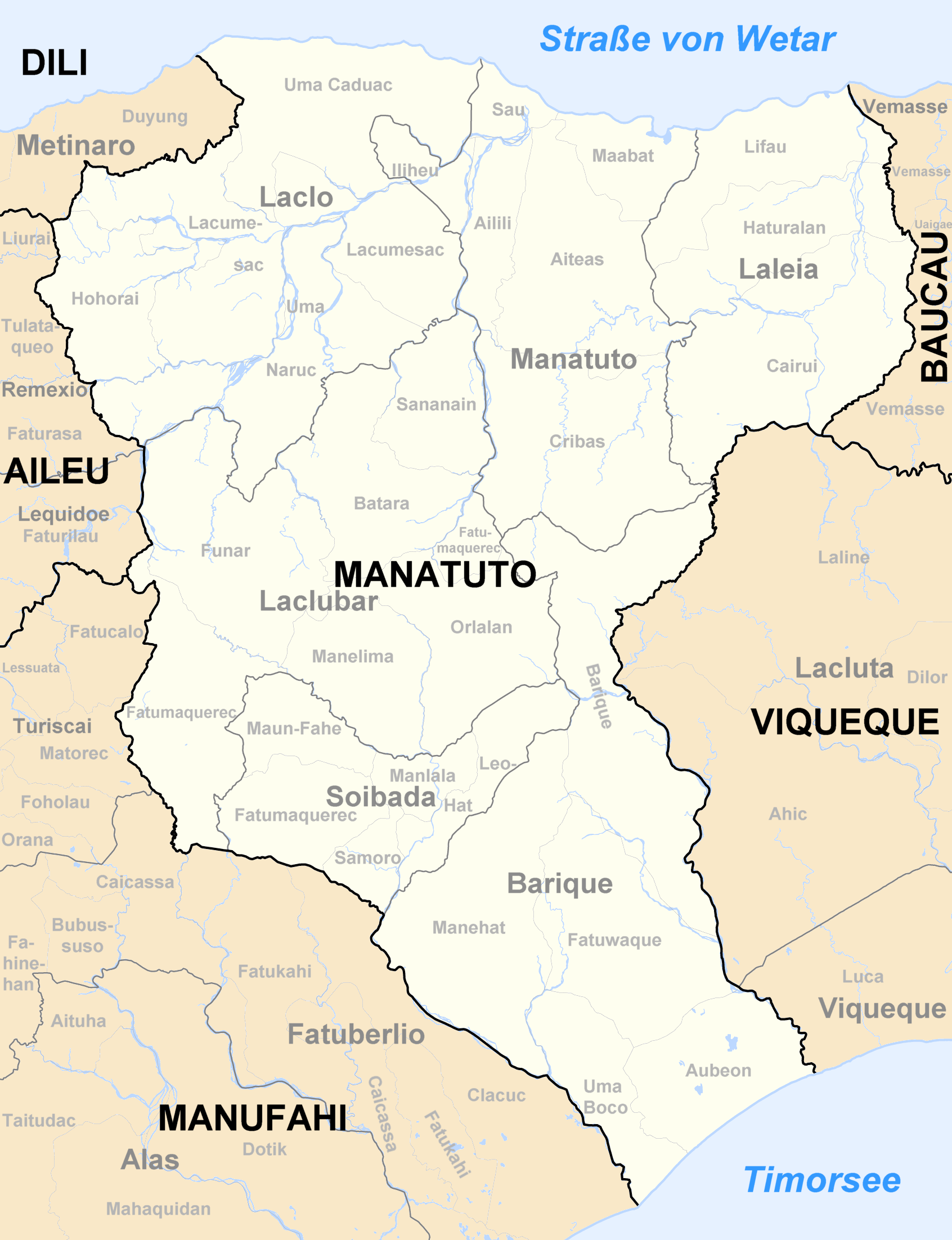
Administrative posts of Manatuto

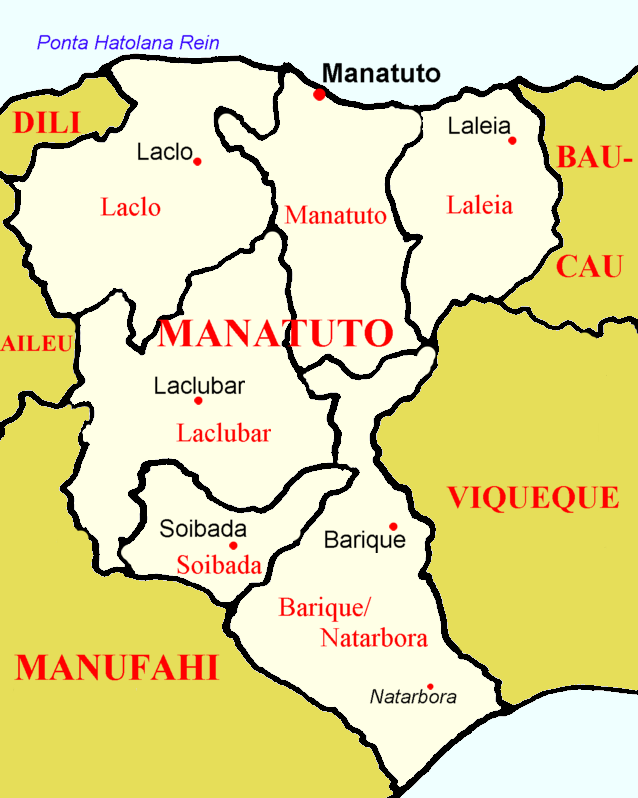
Cities of Manatuto

== History ==
According to a list prepared by Afonso de Castro, governor of the colony of Portuguese Timor from 1859 to 1863, Manatuto was one of 47 kingdoms in that colony at the time.

== Administrative posts ==
The municipality's administrative posts (formerly sub-districts) are:

- Barique-Natarbora (pop. 4,900)
- Laclo (pop. 6,400)
- Laclubar (pop. 10,100)
- Laleia (pop. 3,200)
- Manatuto (pop. 11,500)
- Soibada (pop. 2,950)

The administrative posts are divided into 29 sucos ("villages") in total.

== Demographics ==
In addition to the official languages of Timor-Leste (Tetun and Portuguese), a large part of the population of the municipality speaks the Malayo-Polynesian language Galoli, which is designated as a "national language" by the constitution.

== Notable people ==
The municipality is known as the birthplace of Xanana Gusmão, later to become the nation's first president. He was born in the village of Laleia (19 km East of Manatuto town).
