= List of hospitals in Timor-Leste =

Timor-Leste has one national hospital, Guido Valadares National Hospital (HNGV), located in the capital, Dili, and five other referral hospitals covering secondary health care needs; these are able to carry out some surgical procedures, including appendectomies and caesarean section deliveries. HNGV is the country's only tertiary referral hospital. However, not all of the tertiary care organised for East Timorese patients is carried out at HNGV; most such care is administered overseas, under a limited number of overseas referrals. According to Júlio Sarmento da Costa, who was appointed Minister for the Affairs of National Liberation Combatants in May 2020 [translation]:

"Many seriously ill people including veterans have to be referred to overseas hospitals to have their health checked because in Timor Leste there is no international standard hospital including Guido Valadares National Hospital (HNGV)".

As of 2011, Timor-Leste's hospitals were supported by 65 community health centres and 187 health centres, together with 507 Servisu Integrado du Saude Comunidade (transl. Integrated Community Health Service) (SISCa) outposts serving villages and sucos to which access was difficult. By 2016, the number of community health centres had increased to 66, and the number of health posts to 193. As of 2021, there were 71 community health centres, 318 health posts, seven treatment posts serving as mini health posts, and 600 SISCa outposts.

Hospitals in Timor-Leste
Name	Type	Municipality	Location	References
Aileu Hospital	Municipal	Aileu	Aileu	
Ainaro Hospital	Municipal	Ainaro	Ainaro	
Eduardo Ximenes Regional Hospital (HoREX)	Referral	Baucau	Baucau	
Ermera Hospital	Municipal	Ermera	Ermera	
Guido Valadares National Hospital (HNGV)	Tertiary referral	Dili	Bidau, Dili	
Lahane Hospital	General/cardiac	Dili	Lahane, Dili	
Liquiçá Hospital	Municipal	Liquiçá	Liquiçá	
Lospalos Hospital	Municipal	Lautém	Lospalos	
Maliana Referral Hospital	Referral	Bobonaro	Maliana	
Maubisse Referral Hospital	Referral	Ainaro	Maubisse	
Oecusse Referral Hospital	Referral	Oecusse	Pante Macassar	
Same Hospital	Municipal	Manufahi	Same	
StarKing Medical Center	Private	Dili	Audian, Dili	
Suai Referral Hospital	Referral	Cova Lima	Suai	
Viqueque Hospital	Municipal	Viqueque	Viqueque	

== See also ==
- Healthcare in Timor-Leste
