= Fohoren =

- Suco and village
- Location in Timor-Leste
- Coordinates: 9°17′01″S 125°05′22″E
- Country: Timor-Leste
- District: Cova Lima District
- Subdistrict: Fohorem
- Suco: Fohoren

Government
  - Chief (Chefe de Suco): Agusto Cardoso
- Elevation: 595 m (1,952 ft)

Population (2004)
  - Total: 1,468
- Time zone: UTC+9 (Timor-Leste Standard Time)
- Climate: Aw

Fohoren is a village and suco in the subdistrict of Fohorem, Cova Lima District, Timor-Leste. According to the 2004 census, the suco of Fohoren has a population of 1,468 people. Its current chief is Agusto Cardoso (as of 2009).

== History ==
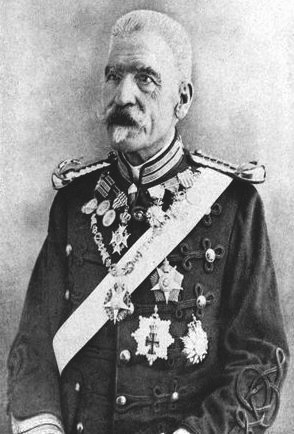
José Celestino da Silva

Fohorem was one of the traditional kingdoms of Timor, which were ruled by a Liurai. It appears on a list of Afonso de Castro, a former governor of Portuguese Timor, who in 1868 counted 47 kingdoms.

According to oral traditions, Fohorem was involved with politics and wars of conquest against other kingdoms and that its supremacy secured in the region. In March 1895, Governor José Celestino da Silva led an offensive against Fohorem and other neighboring kingdoms and it became the administrative center of the Portuguese in the region. Only towards the end of the colonial period was it transferred to the Suai subdistrict.

== Geography ==
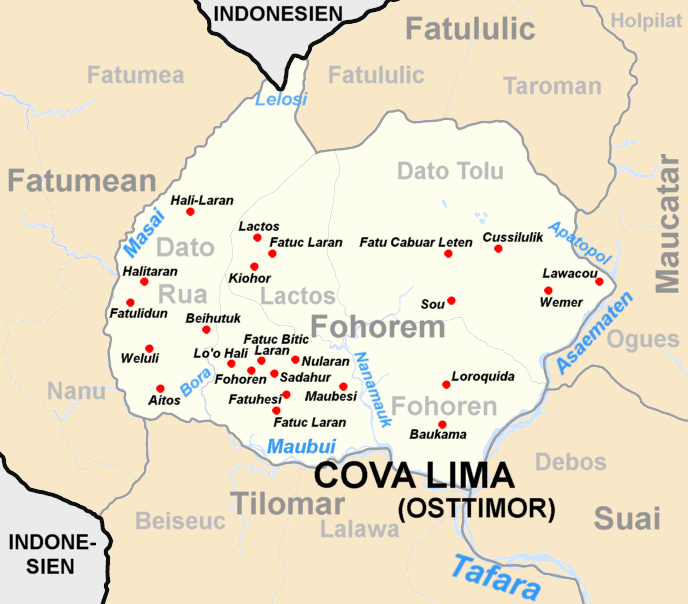
Subdistrict Fohorem with its capital Fohoren in the suco of Fohoren

The village of Fohoren lies 94 kilometres (58 mi) by air southwest of the capital Dili and about 20 kilometres (12 mi) north-west of Suai at an altitude of 595 metres (1,952 ft). In close proximity to Fohoren are several villages including Fatuc Bitic Laran (Fatukbitiklaran), Nularan, Sadahur (Sadahor) Lo'o Hali (Loohali) and Fatuhesi (Fatubesi) which form together a bigger settlement. There is an elementary school called Escola Primaria Catolica do Rosario N. Shra which was established during the Portuguese colonial period and which was used as a polling station during the 2007 elections., two secondary schools, a converted helicopter landing pad and a community health center. During the parliamentary elections in East Timor in 2007, the ballot boxes were collected by helicopter.

The suco of Fohoren is located in the south of the subdistrict of Fohorem. In the west, it borders on the Suco Dato Rua, and to the north with Suco Dato Tolu. The Bora River flows along its local border to the west and flows into the Maubui River to the south. Similarly, the Nanamauk River flows from Dato Tolu through the center. To the southeast corner is the Asaematen River, which merges into the Tafara River.

== See also ==
- Outline of Timor-Leste
