= Suai Referral Hospital =

Geography
- Location: Suai, Cova Lima, Timor-Leste

Organisation
- Type: District

Services
- Emergency department: Yes
- Beds: 21

Suai Referral Hospital (Portuguese: Hospital de Referência de Suai; Tetun: Ospitál Referénsia/Referál Suai) is a hospital in Suai, Cova Lima Municipality, Timor-Leste. One of the country's five referral hospitals, it provides primary and secondary care, with patients in need of advanced care transferred to the Guido Valadares National Hospital in the capital, Dili. The hospital was established during the Indonesian occupation period (1975–1999) and reconstructed in the late 2000s.

== History ==
The Suai hospital was established during the Indonesian occupation period (1975–1999), though initially it was an internment clinic and did not perform operations. In 1999, after the independence referendum, the hospital was in a state of ruin. It was then taken over by the international humanitarian organization Médecins du Monde, which reconstructed it, and provided general healthcare to the local population, including emergency operations such as caesarean sections. The facilities were later managed by Médecins Sans Frontières and the United Nations. Suai Referral Hospital was officially reestablished by law in 2003.

In 2005, the government announced plans to reconstruct or renovate Timor-Leste's five referral hospitals by 2007. In August 2007, China Metallurgical Construction, a Chinese state-owned enterprise, won the tender to construct the Suai hospital, financed by the Timorese state budget. During the COVID-19 pandemic, the hospital constructed a COVID-19 isolation ward and a high-dependency unit. In 2023, new microbiology laboratory equipment was installed at the hospital, allowing for improved diagnostic capability and clinical care decisions. In December 2023, the hospital opened a cafeteria for patients' families, donated by the private company Timor Resources.

== Facilities and services ==
Suai Referral Hospital provides primary and secondary care, with a small number of patients in need of advanced care transferred to the Guido Valadares National Hospital in the capital, Dili. The hospital has surgery, radiology, pharmacy, and emergency laboratory capacities. As of 2019, the hospital had 21 beds, which were reportedly in poor condition. The hospital's medical staff, made of up of mostly Cuban and Timorese physicians, includes specialists in surgery, urology, cardiology, neurology, orthopedics, and pediatrics. In 2019, the hospital had 35 healthcare professionals on staff, including 12 general practitioners and 15 midwives.

The hospital has often experienced funding constraints and shortages of medication, equipment, and professional staff. In 2024, the hospital was reportedly out of stock of 44 medications, including 14 considered to be "vital." Still, in 2019, the hospital's environment was rated "excellent" in recognition of the maintenance and cleanliness of its facilities.

Due to limitations in equipment and staff capacity, some cases, including patients with broken bones, cancer, stroke, and heart conditions are transferred to the national hospital for diagnosis and/or advanced care. In the first eight months of 2023, the Suai hospital treated more than 1,200 patients, with less than 20 being transferred to Dili for care.

== Education ==
Each year, final-year medical students from the Universidade Nacional Timor Lorosa'e undertake internships in Timor-Leste's five referral hospitals, including the Suai hospital.

== See also ==
- List of hospitals in Timor-Leste
