= Mape, Zumalai =

Coordinates: 09°09′18″S 125°27′13″E

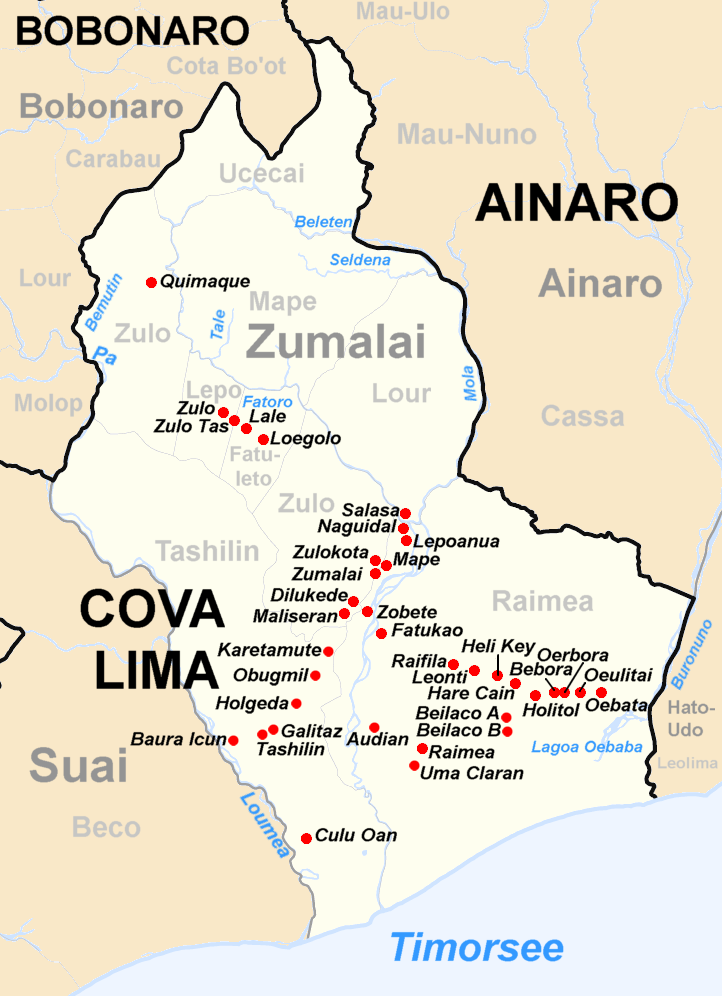
Mape municipality in Zumalai Subdistrict

Mape is a village and suco in Cova Lima Municipality, Timor-Leste in the southern Lesser Sunda Archipelago of Southeast Asia. Administratively, it is part of the Zumalai Administrative Post of Cova Lima District. The suco covers an area of 30.59 km^{2}, and the population was 308 in the 2010 census.
