= Fatululic =

Village in Cova Lima District, Timor-Leste

Coordinates: 9°11′S 125°08′E

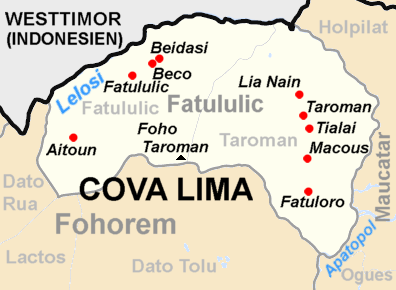
Subdistrict of Fatululic

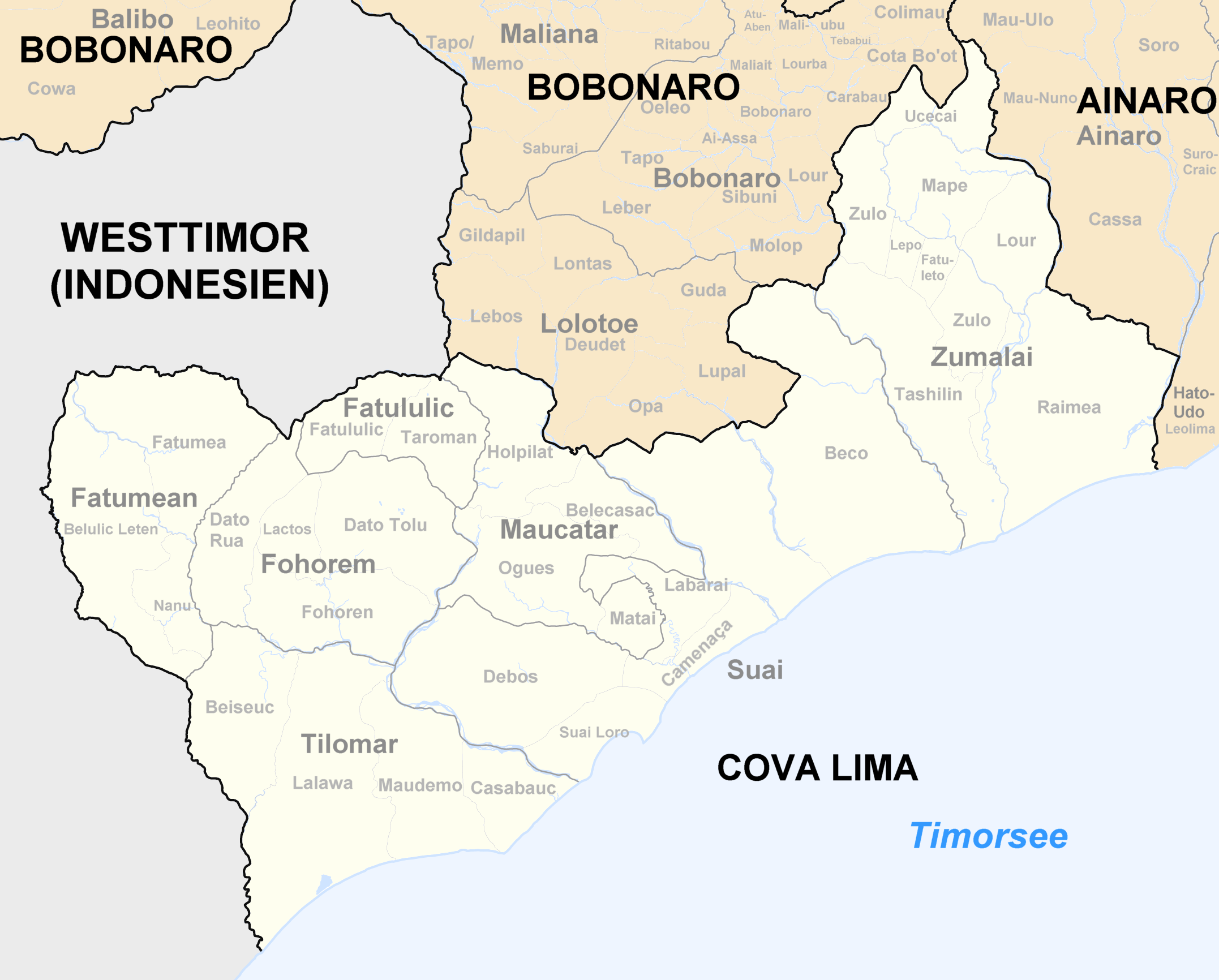
District of Cova Lima

Fatululic (Fatu-Lulik, Fatululik) is a village and suco in Fatululic Subdistrict, Cova Lima District, Timor-Leste. The suco has 549 inhabitants.

The word fatululic formed by two words fatuk=stone and lulic=sacred/holy. Literarlly fatululic is holy stone or sacred stone.
