= Lahane Hospital =

Heritage hospital in East Timor

Dr. António de Carvalho Hospital
- Hospital Dr. António Carvalho (Portuguese); Ospitál Dr. António Carvalho (Tetum)
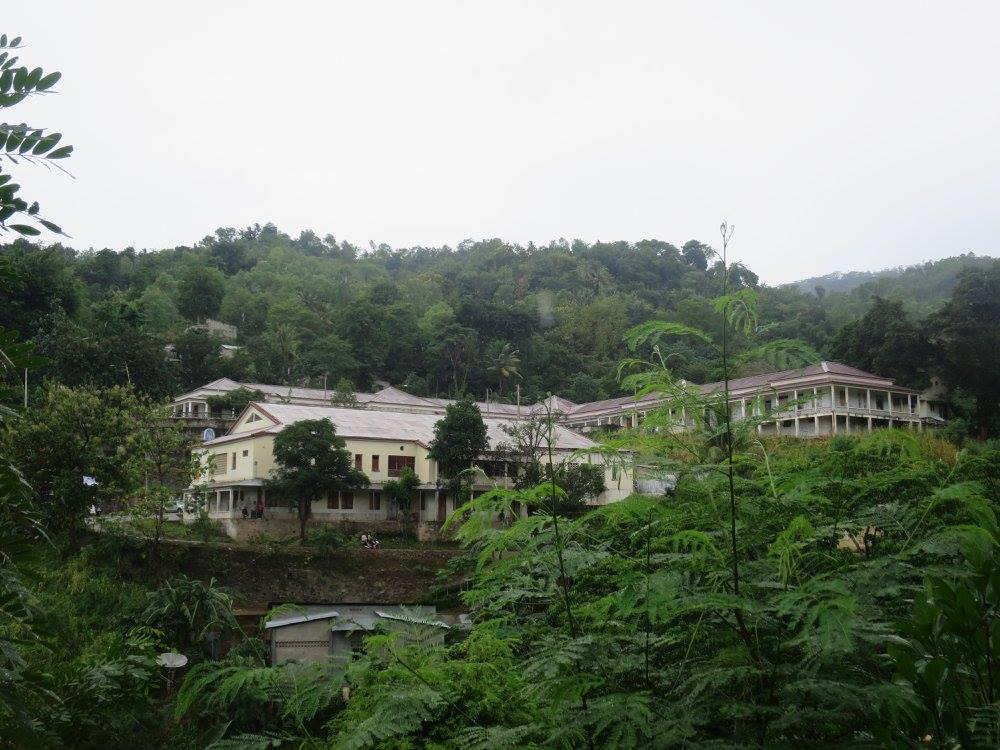
- The hospital in 2017

Geography
- Location: Lahane, Dili, Timor-Leste
- Coordinates: 8°34′43″S 125°34′53″E

Organisation
- Type: General

Services
- Emergency department: Yes

History
- Opened: 1864

The Lahane Hospital, officially Dr. António de Carvalho Hospital (Portuguese: Hospital Dr. António de Carvalho; Tetum: Ospitál Dr. António de Carvalho), and also known as the old Portuguese Hospital (Portuguese: antigo Hospital Português; Tetum: antigu Ospitál Portugés), is a historic public hospital in Timor-Leste. Founded in the 1860s, the hospital is located in Lahane, at the southern edge of the capital city, Dili.

Established in 1864 by the colonial government of Portuguese Timor, the hospital's current building was completed in 1906. The hospital was badly damaged during World War II, but was restored and expanded in the postwar decades. During the Indonesian occupation of East Timor, the facility was used as a military hospital and fell into disrepair. The hospital was also the site of the killing of injured victims of the 1991 Santa Cruz massacre by Indonesian soldiers and civilian hospital staff. The hospital was fully rehabilitated in 2020–2021 for use as an isolation facility for severe COVID-19 cases during the global COVID-19 pandemic, and was the site of Timor-Leste's first death from the virus. Today, the hospital is home to a cardiology center and palliative care center.

== Name ==
The hospital was established as the Castro-Lahane Hospital in 1864. When it was reconstructed in 1906, the hospital was given the name King Carlos I Hospital, before being renamed the Dr. Carvalho Hospital after the 5 October 1910 revolution in Portugal. During the Indonesian occupation of East Timor, the hospital was renamed Wira Husada Hospital (Indonesian: Rumah Sakit Wira Husada). Today, the hospital is officially the Dr. António de Carvalho Hospital, but is commonly referred to as the Lahane Hospital or the old Portuguese Hospital.

== History ==
=== Portuguese colonial period ===
The governor of Portuguese Timor, Afonso de Castro, began construction of the hospital in 1860. Construction was completed under his successor, José Manuel Pereira de Almeida, in 1864 and named the Castro-Lahane Hospital. The hospital's site in Lahane was selected for its elevated location and healthy climate, in contrast to the malarial conditions of central Dili. The hospital was divided into three sections, one for Europeans, one for Chinese, and one for indigenous Timorese, at a daily cost of four, three, and two rupees, respectively. In 1877, a British-Australian visitor wrote described the hospital as spacious, clean, and well-run. Nevertheless, the hospital lacked many basic facilities, like a maternity ward.

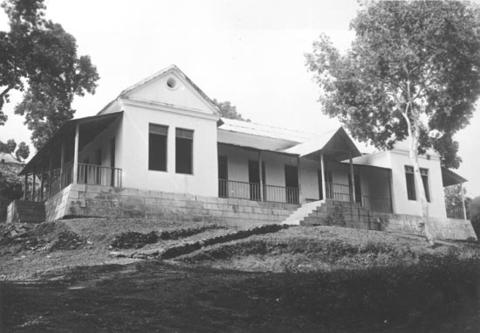
The women's wing of the hospital sometime before 1940

In 1892, the colony's public works department under Governor Cipriano Forjaz began planning to reconstruct the hospital, the condition of which had deteriorated since its construction three decades earlier. Construction began under Forjaz's successor, José Celestino da Silva, and, being funded entirely from local sources, took several years to complete. The new hospital finally opened in 1906, and was named for King Carlos I. After the 5 October 1910 revolution which saw Portugal become a republic, the hospital was renamed the Dr. Carvalho Hospital, which some sources state was in tribute to Tomas de Carvalho, the first representative of the Province of Macau and Timor to the Portuguese Chamber of Deputies. The new hospital was designed in the style of a sanatorium, fashionable in Europe at the time. Located on a hillside, the building features a central structure with open-air galleries on each side.

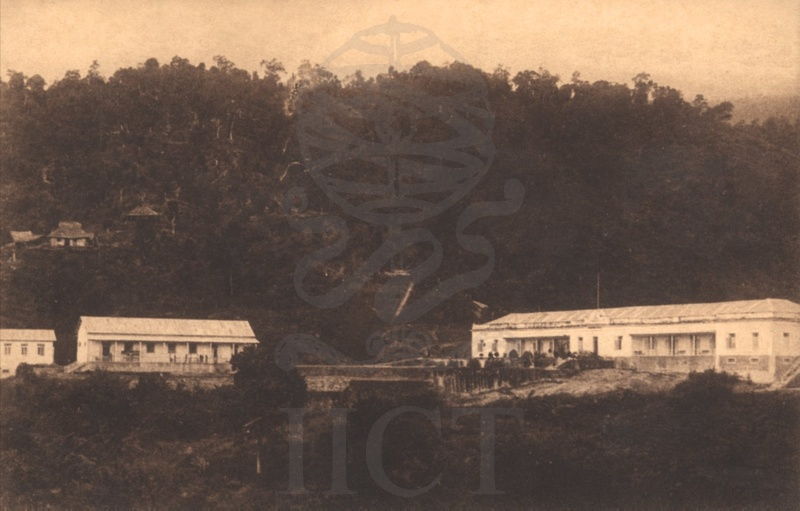
The hospital sometime before 1970

The Lahane Hospital was the only one in Portuguese Timor until the mid-1930s, when another was constructed in Liquiçá. A nursing school was opened at the hospital in 1920, and in 1938–1939 an isolation ward for patients with contagious diseases, like tuberculosis, was built. Following the Japanese invasion of Portuguese Timor in 1942 during World War II, the hospital served as a refuge for some Portuguese who remained in the territory. It was later operated by the occupying forces until their surrender in 1945. However, heavy bombardment during this period, including a strike on the isolation ward by an Australian air raid, left the hospital heavily damaged. After the war, the facility was restored and expanded, and was fully renovated in the 1960s. In 1947, a maternity ward was established in what had been the women's wing. The isolation ward was converted to an operating theater and later became part of the maternity ward. In 1967, the hospital established a pediatric ward. A clinical laboratory was also added during the postwar period. These additions, modeled after British hospitals in Australia and India, altered the building's original Portuguese-style architecture. Modifications included the elimination of its symmetrical design, the removal of its curved pediment, and the opening of its gallery to the entire length of the building.

=== Indonesian occupation ===
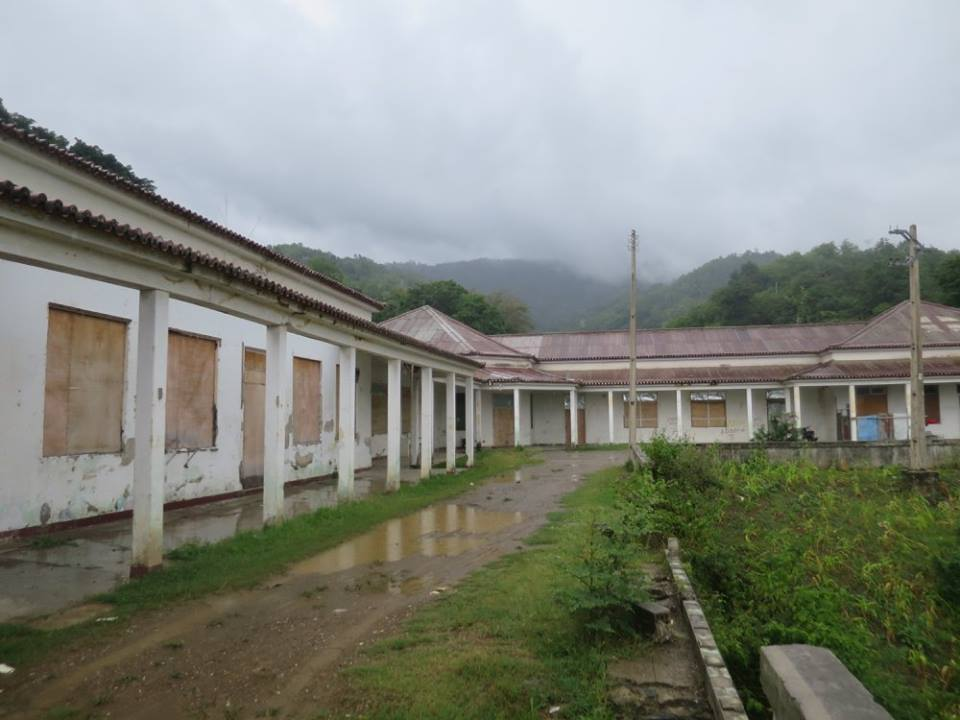
The hospital in 2017

During the Indonesian occupation of East Timor, the hospital was used as a military hospital and renamed Wira Husada Hospital (Indonesian: Rumah Sakit Wira Husada), and gradually fell into disrepair. During this period, many local people distrusted the hospital, because, according to a United Nations report, "many had gone in and not come out" and "bodies were not returned to their families." After the 1991 Santa Cruz massacre, the Indonesian military carried as many as 10 trucks full of dead and injured to the hospital. João Dias, a young nurse at the hospital, accused hospital staff of carrying out a massacre of the wounded victims. Max Stahl, a British journalist, went to Dili to investigate Dias' claims. Dias stated that the military "asked the hospital laboratory for sulfuric acid, but their apprehension about the noise from the victims' cries made them abandon the idea." Instead, Dias claimed, they gave each of the injured a white pill with a glass of water, after which the victims gradually lost strength and their breathing weakened. Dias named two civilian staff, Chico and Araujo, and two Indonesian soldiers, Pamabas and hospital director Dr. Nyoman Winyata, as the distributors of the pills. He said that the soldiers returned later to check on the victims, and used a large stone to crush the skulls of any who remained living. Resistance leader José Ramos-Horta said the bodies of injured who died at the Lahane Hospital were dumped in two mass graves at Tibar, west of Dili. Timor-Leste's Centro Nacional Chega! describes these events as the "second site of the Santa Cruz massacre."

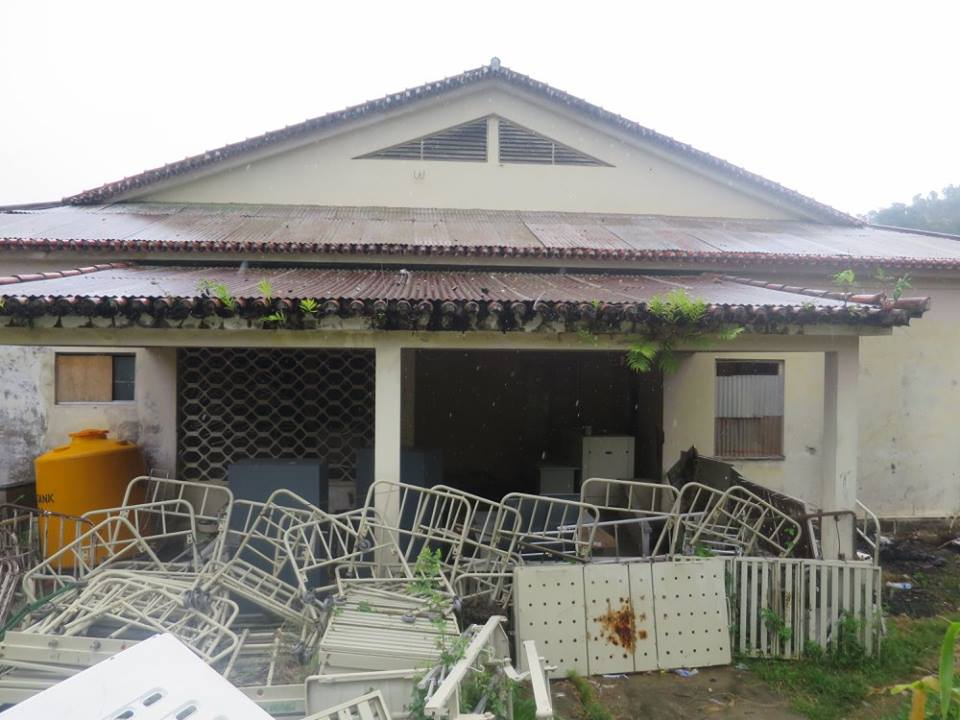
The hospital in 2017

Stahl obtained some of the pills from Dias, who had hidden them away, and brought them to a friend in Kupang in Indonesian West Timor. He asked her to smell the open vial, after which she had heavy nosebleeds. Indonesia denied that it had poisoned injured victims of the Santa Cruz massacre, attempting to discredit the allegations by denying that Dias had been a nurse at the hospital. Stahl then published a photograph, captured previously by a Japanese television crew, which showed Dias and Winyata working at the hospital in their official capacities. These revelations increased the already-mounting global pressure on Indonesia in the aftermath of the massacre.

=== UNTAET and post-independence ===
During the United Nations Transitional Administration in East Timor (UNTAET) period from 1999 to 2002, the hospital was administered by a Portuguese government mission. At the time, UNTAET planned for the Lahane Hospital and Dili's central hospital (now Guido Valadares National Hospital) to eventually become a single institution with two campuses. After Timor-Leste's independence, the hospital remained in a state of serious disrepair. In 2011, the Council of Ministers approved a resolution granting a long-term lease to an Australian health organization to restore and operate the hospital. The new institution, to be named the Hospital of Hope, planned to offer "pre- and post-operative care" and provide training to Timorese healthcare professionals by Australian and other foreign staff. In 2018, the Ministry of Health announced that after being rehabilitated, the hospital would be used to provide hemodialysis and other health services. In 2019, US$300,000 was allocated for repairs, equipment, and new facilities.

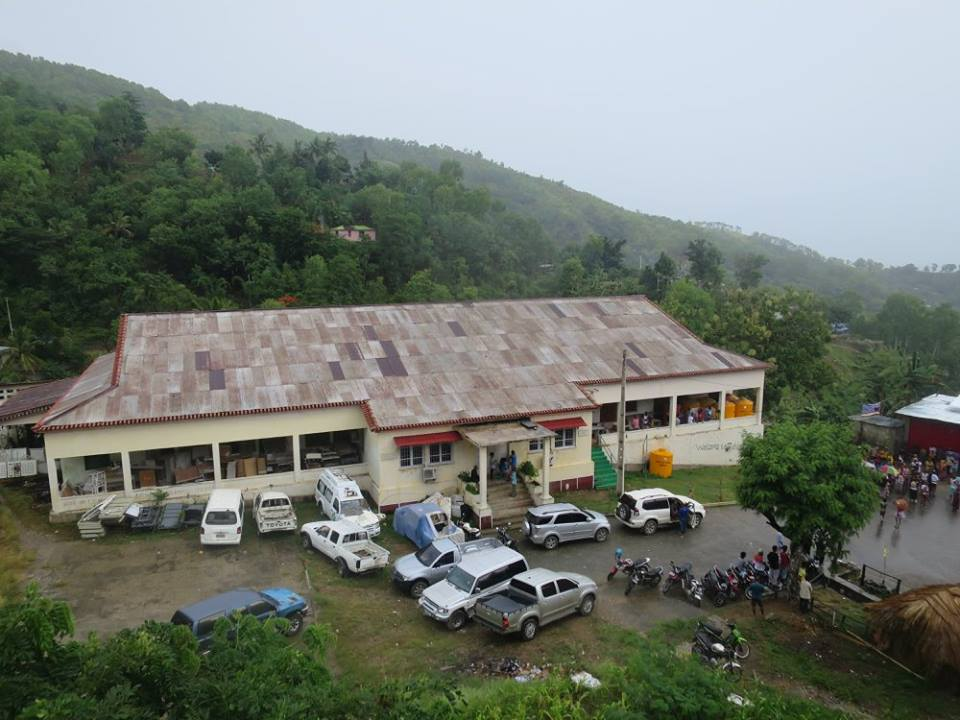
The hospital in 2017

In April 2020, amidst the global COVID-19 pandemic, the Ministry of Health designated the hospital as an isolation facility for severe cases of COVID-19. In May, Prime Minister Taur Matan Ruak directed the Ministry of Public Works to fast-track the hospital's rehabilitation. After the pandemic, the government said, the facility would be used as a military hospital. Rehabilitation work began in May 2020, with the project expected to be complete by September or October 2020. $4.51 million was allocated for the project, including $450,000 from the national COVID-19 Fund. By September 2020, the building's rehabilitation was 90 percent complete, with the contractor planning to hand the facility over to the government later that month. The hospital was fully refinished with new floors and ceilings, repaired and repainted walls, oxygen connections to each room, an air conditioning system, and interior electricity. Four isolation rooms were set up for COVID-19 patients.

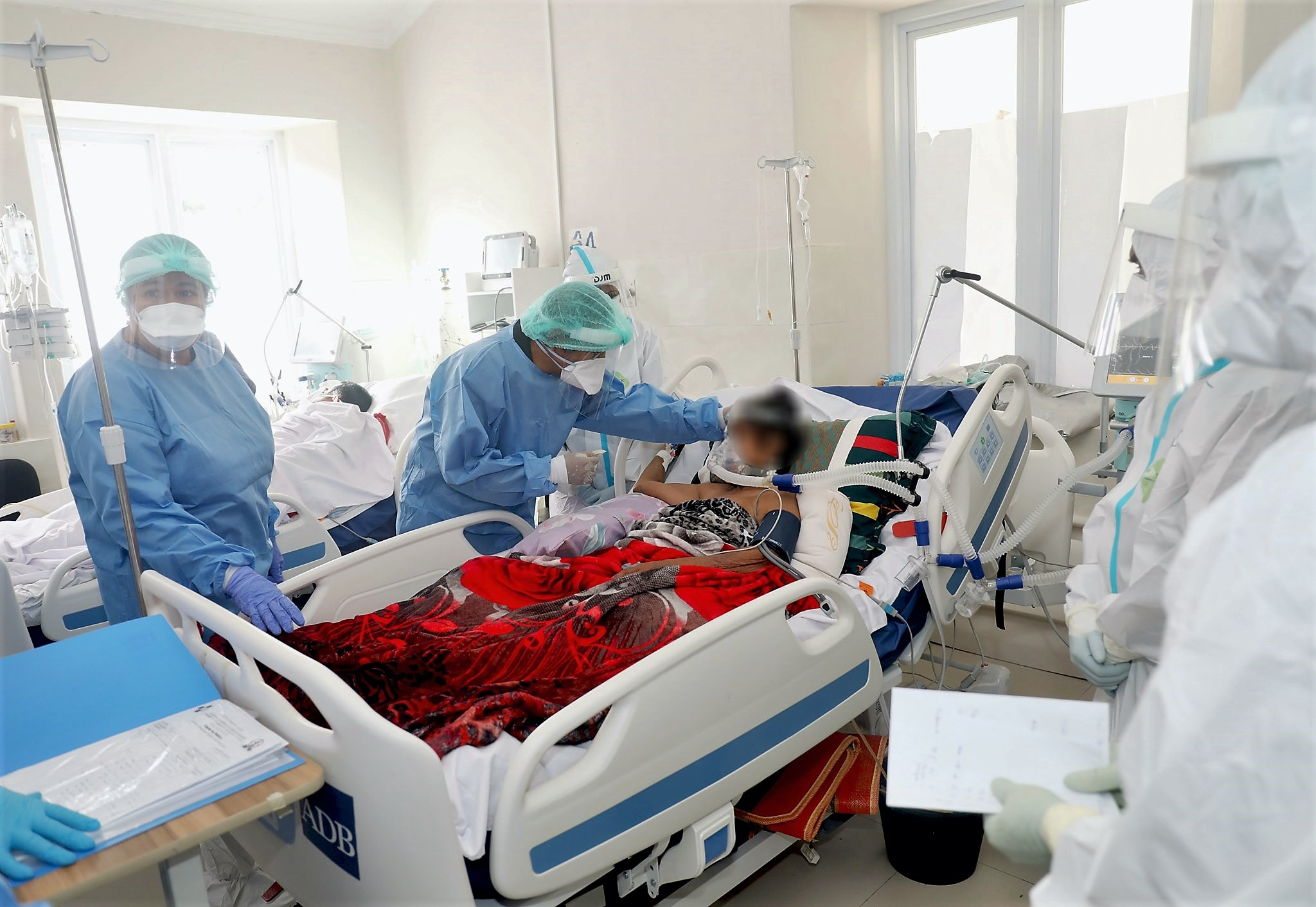
COVID-19 patients in the rehabilitated hospital in 2021

The prime minister, along with Minister of Health Odete Maria Freitas Belo and Vice Minister Bonifácio Maucoli dos Reis, visited the hospital in January 2021, at which point the facility's interior restoration was fully complete, with only landscaping, exterior electrical connection, and protective walls remaining to be completed. The prime minister expressed his satisfaction with the project's progress, and encouraged the Ministry of Health to complete the rehabilitation soon so that the hospital could be used to relieve pressure on the overcrowded National Hospital. In March 2021, the Ministry of Health, with support from the Asian Development Bank, acquired over 800 pieces of medical equipment, including hospital beds, intensive care unit ventilators, and other items for use in the new hospital. In April 2021, the Lahane Hospital was the site of Timor-Leste's first COVID-19 death, a 44-year-old woman.

In October 2022, the Ministry of Health announced plans to establish a cardiology center at the hospital the following year. $500,000 was designated for the purchase of medical equipment, and Timorese physicians were sent abroad to receive specialized training. In July 2024, the Ministry of Health announced that the new Lahane Cardiac Center (LCC) would begin providing heart disease treatment in November that year. By that time, more than $2 million had been allocated towards the project. In August 2024, the hospital held an opening ceremony for its palliative care center.

== Facilities and services ==
The hospital's historic building is pre-classified as a World Heritage Site by UNESCO. As of 2020, the facility had 150 patient rooms. The Lahane Cardiac Center (LCC), located at the hospital, has a critical heart failure ward, inpatient and emergency services, and a pharmacy. The hospital also contains a palliative care center.

== See also ==
- List of hospitals in Timor-Leste
