= Tilomar Administrative Post =

Administrative post in Cova Lima Municipality, Timor-Leste

Tilomar
- Administrative Post
- Posto Administrativo de Tilomar (Portuguese); Postu administrativu Tilomár (Tetun)
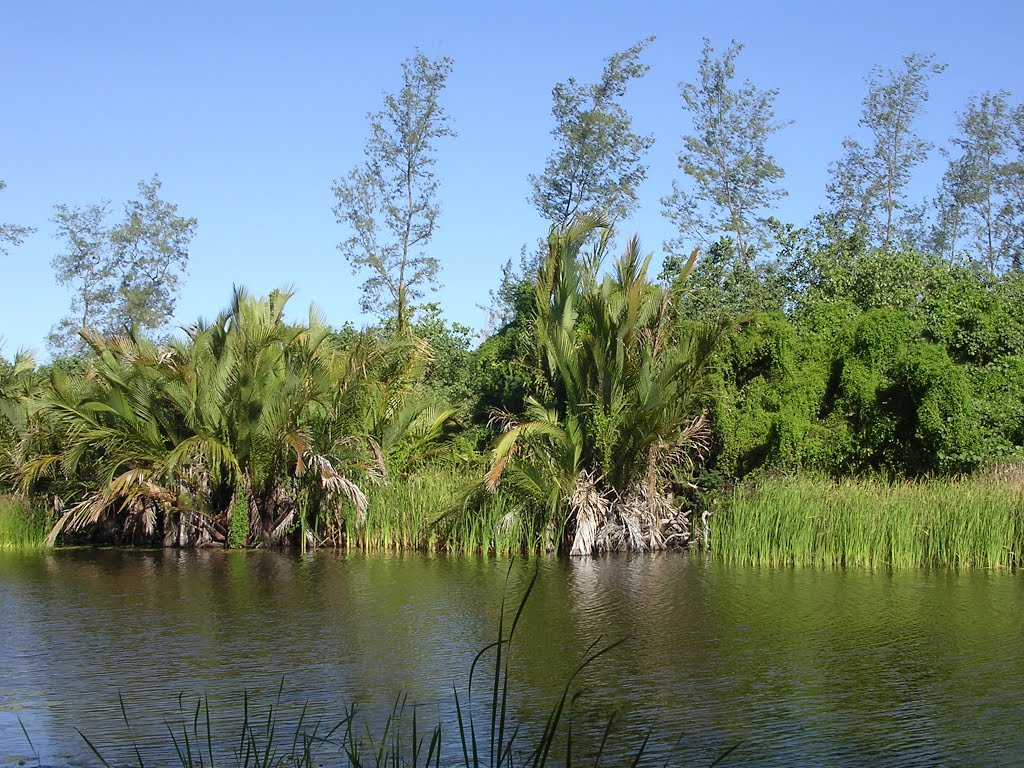
- Asan Foun freshwater lagoon

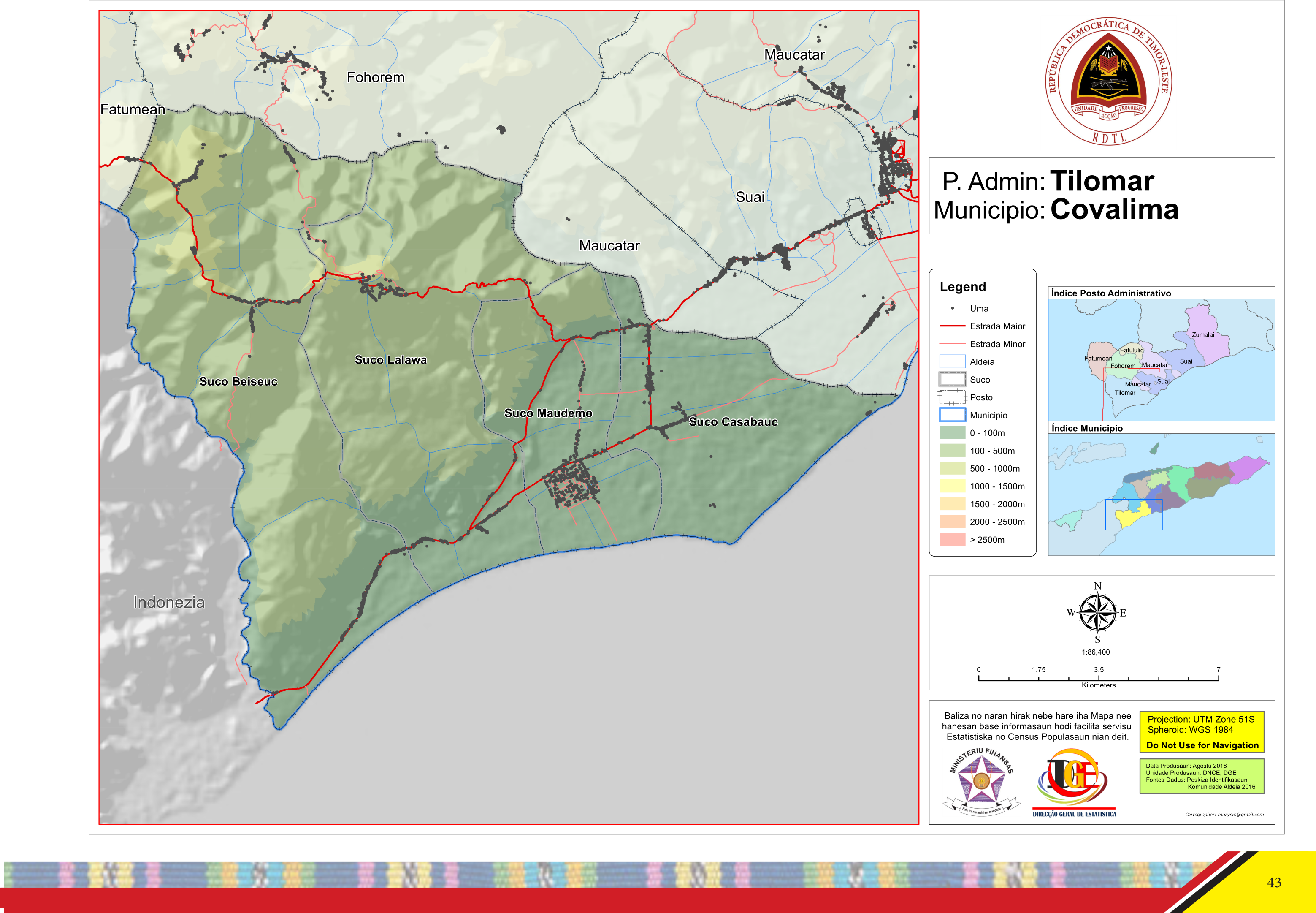
- Official map

- Location within East Timor
- Coordinates: 9°20′S 125°07′E
- Country: Timor-Leste
- Municipality: Cova Lima
- Seat: Casabauc
- Sucos: Beiseuc; Casabauc; Lalawa; Maudemo

Area
  - Total: 194.1 km^{2} (74.9 sq mi)

Population (2015 census)
  - Total: 7,885
  - Density: 40.62/km^{2} (105.2/sq mi)

Households (2015 census)
  - Total: 1,763
- Time zone: UTC+09:00 (TLT)

Tilomar, officially Tilomar Administrative Post (Portuguese: Posto Administrativo de Tilomar, Tetun: Postu administrativu Tilomár), is an administrative post (and was formerly a subdistrict) in Cova Lima municipality, Timor-Leste. Its seat or administrative centre is Casabauc.

The administrative post has an area of 194,64 km^{2} and 7,043 inhabitants (2010). Most spoken language is Tetum Terik, but there is a big Bunak minority, too. Tilomar is divided into four sucos: Beiseuc, Casabauc, Lalawa, and Maudemo.

59% of the households in Tilomar are producing corn, 58% maniok, 53% vegetables, 48% coconuts, 15% rice and 8% coffee.
