= Fohorem Administrative Post =

Administrative post in Cova Lima Municipality, Timor-Leste

Fohorem
- Administrative Post
- Posto Administrativo de Fohorem (Portuguese); Postu administrativu Fohorén (Tetum)
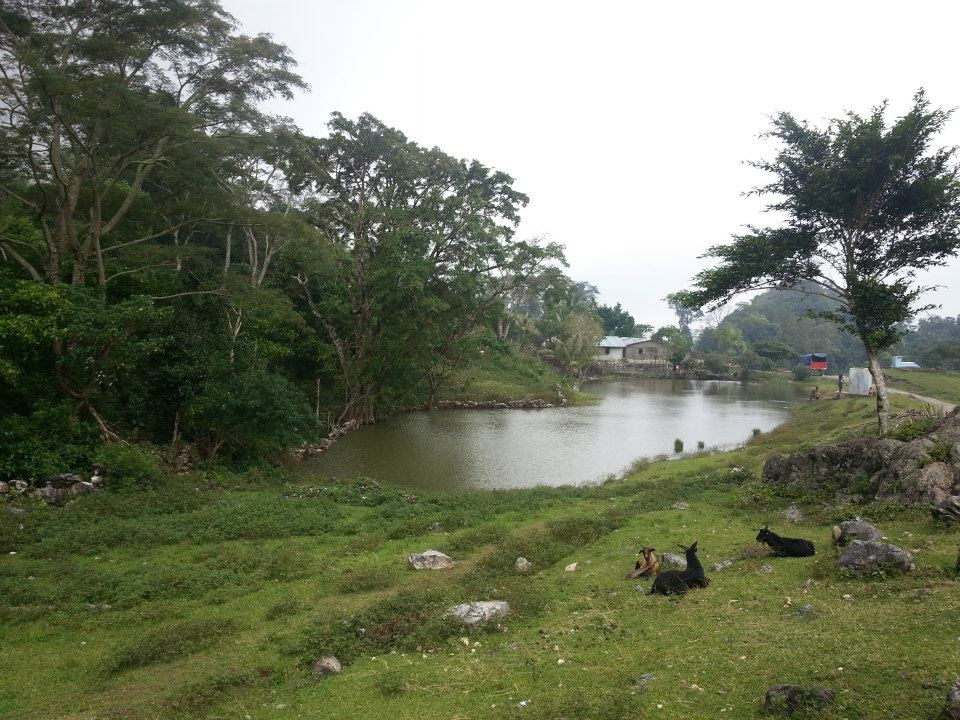
- Dato Rua, Fohorem

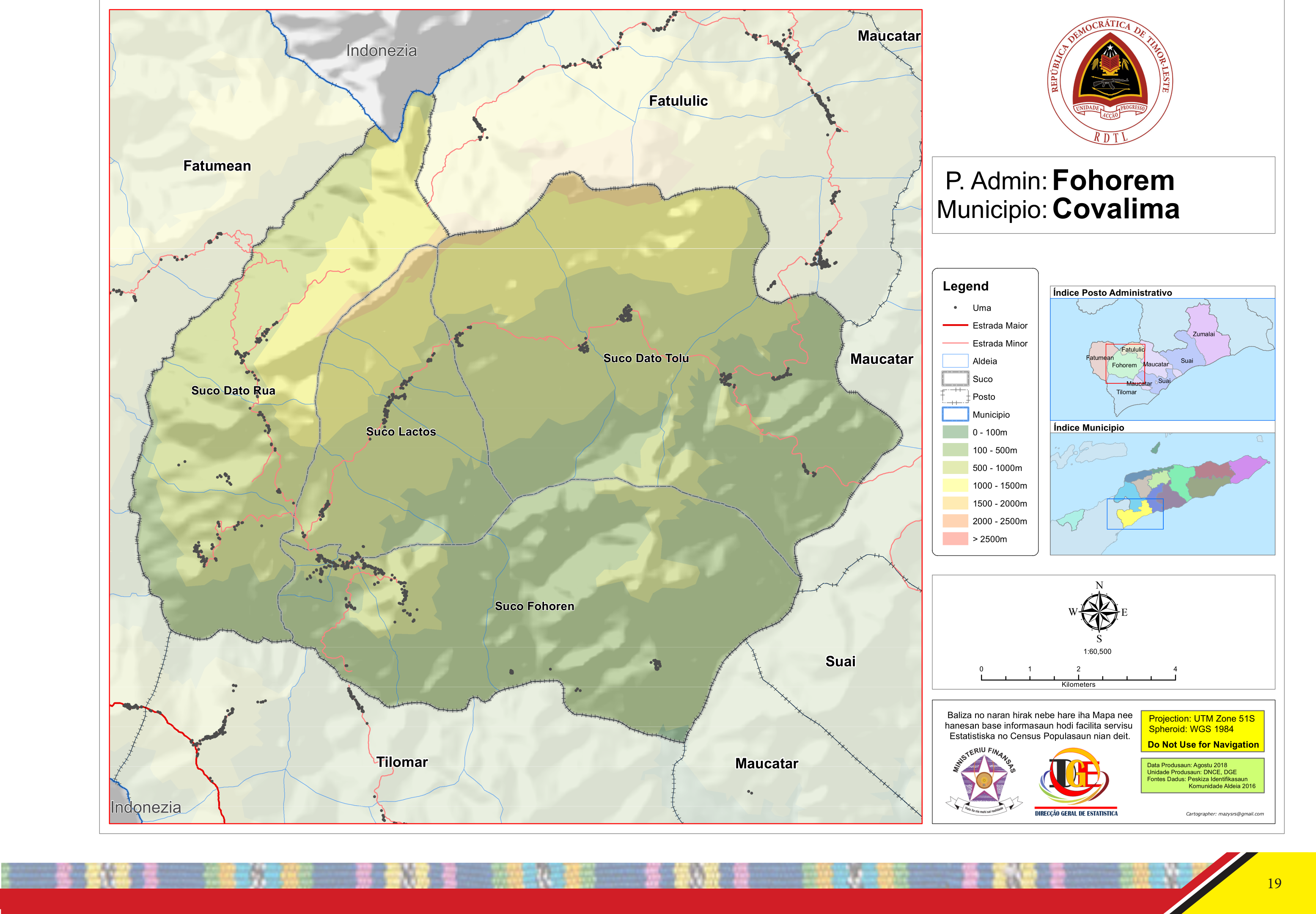
- Official map

- Location within East Timor
- Coordinates: 9°17′S 125°05′E
- Country: Timor-Leste
- Municipality: Cova Lima
- Seat: Fohoren
- Sucos: Dato Rua; Dato Tolu; Fohoren; Lactos

Area
  - Total: 131.5 km^{2} (50.8 sq mi)

Population (2015 census)
  - Total: 4,086
  - Density: 31.07/km^{2} (80.48/sq mi)

Households (2015 census)
  - Total: 854
- Time zone: UTC+09:00 (TLT)

Fohorem (Fuorém), officially Fohorem Administrative Post (Portuguese: Posto Administrativo de Fohorem, Tetum: Postu administrativu Fohorén), is an administrative post (and was formerly a subdistrict) in Cova Lima municipality, Timor-Leste. Its seat or administrative centre is Fohoren.
