= Fatululic Administrative Post =

Administrative post in Cova Lima Municipality, Timor-Leste

Fatululic
- Administrative Post
- Posto Administrativo de Fatululic (Portuguese); Postu administrativu Fatu-Lulic (Tetum)
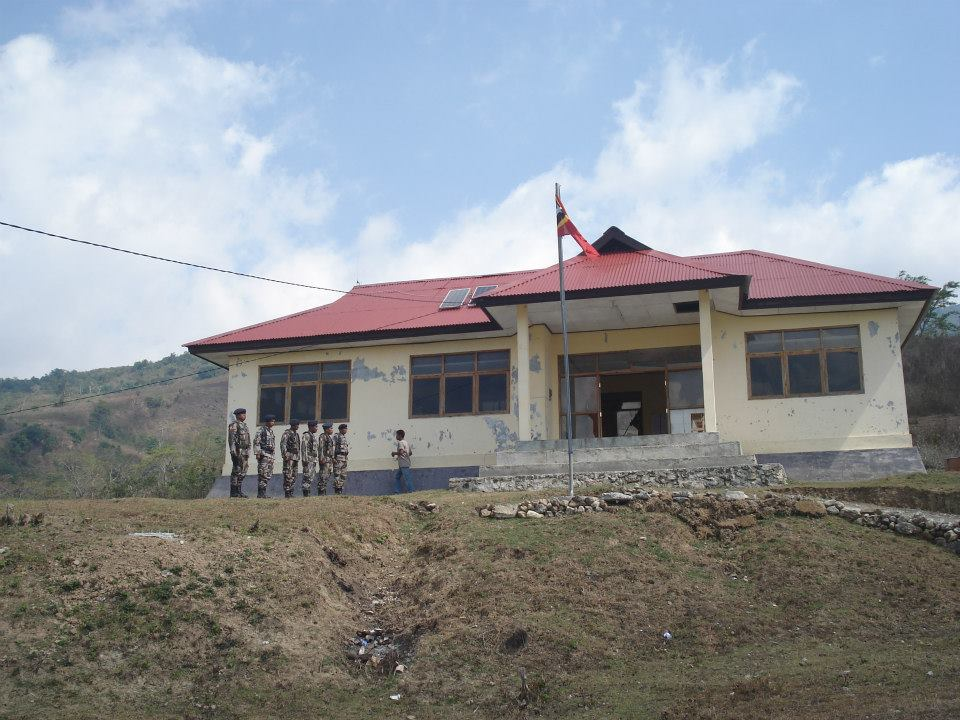
- Fatululic border post, near Beco

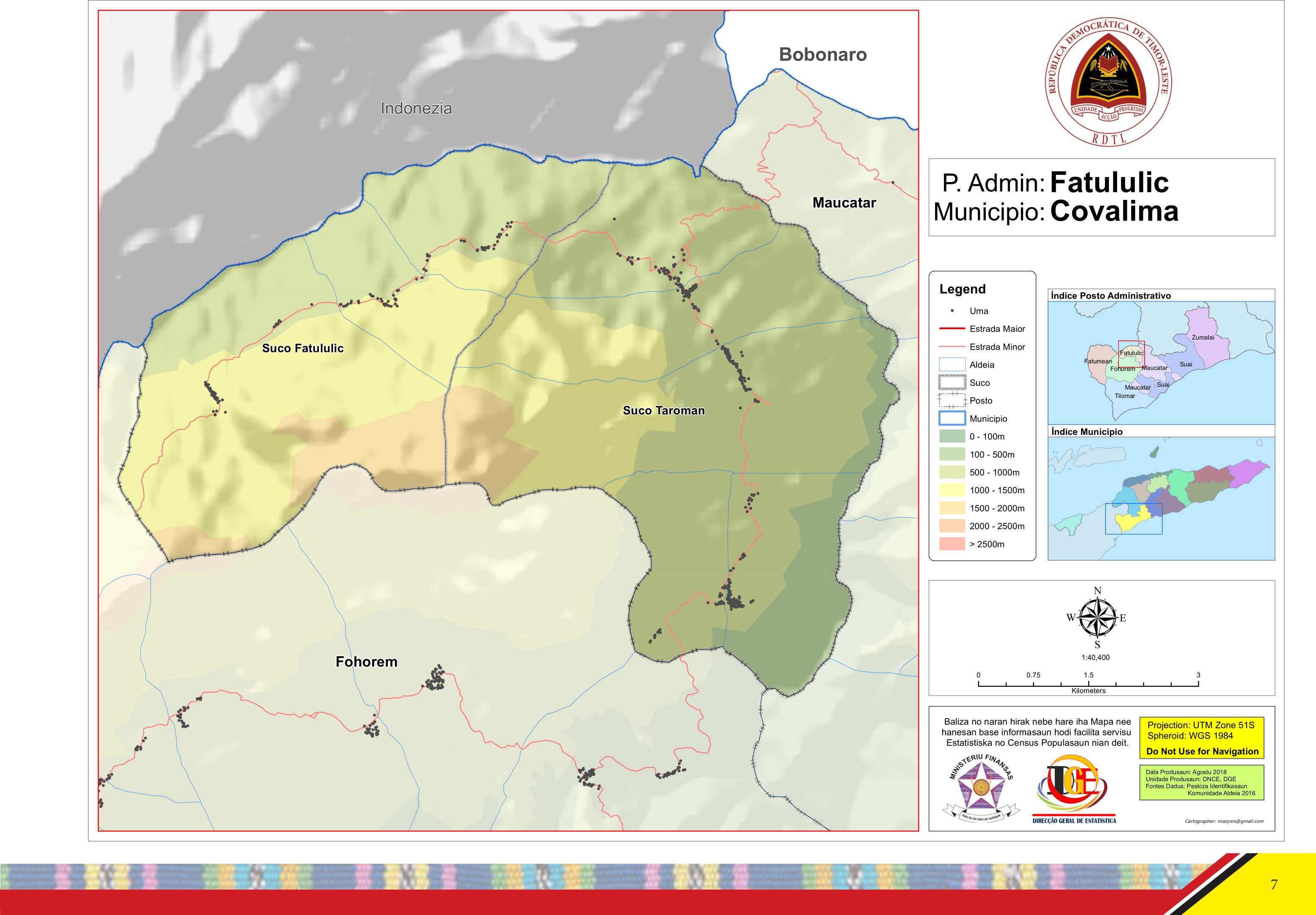
- Official map

- Location within East Timor
- Coordinates: 9°11′S 125°08′E
- Country: Timor-Leste
- Municipality: Cova Lima
- Established: 30 July 1976 (as a kecamatan)
- Seat: Fatululic
- Sucos: Fatululic; Taroman

Area
  - Total: 46.4 km^{2} (17.9 sq mi)

Population (2015 census)
  - Total: 2,027
  - Density: 43.7/km^{2} (113/sq mi)

Households (2015 census)
  - Total: 414
- Time zone: UTC+09:00 (TLT)

Fatululic (Fatu-Lulik, Fatululik), officially Fatululic Administrative Post (Portuguese: Posto Administrativo de Fatululic, Tetum: Postu administrativu Fatu-Lulic), is an administrative post (and was formerly a subdistrict) in Cova Lima municipality, Timor-Leste. Its seat or administrative centre is Fatululic.

The population of the administrative post is 1.894 (2010).

The administrative post comprises two Sucos:

- Fatululic, consisting of aldeias of Aitoun, Beco, and Beidasi.
- Taroman, consisting of aldeias of Fatuloro, Holba, Lia Nain, Macous, and Taroman.
