= Zumalai Administrative Post =

Administrative post in Cova Lima Municipality, East Timor

Zumalai
- Administrative Post
- Posto Administrativo de Zumalai (Portuguese); Postu administrativu Zumalai (Tetun)
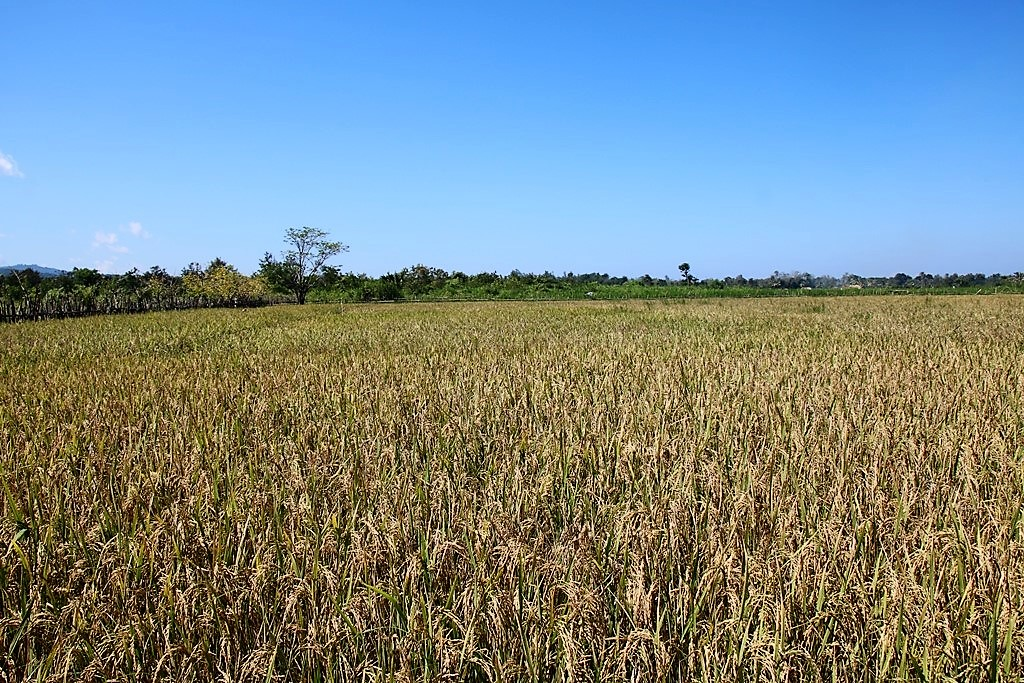
- Aldeia Webaba, Raimea

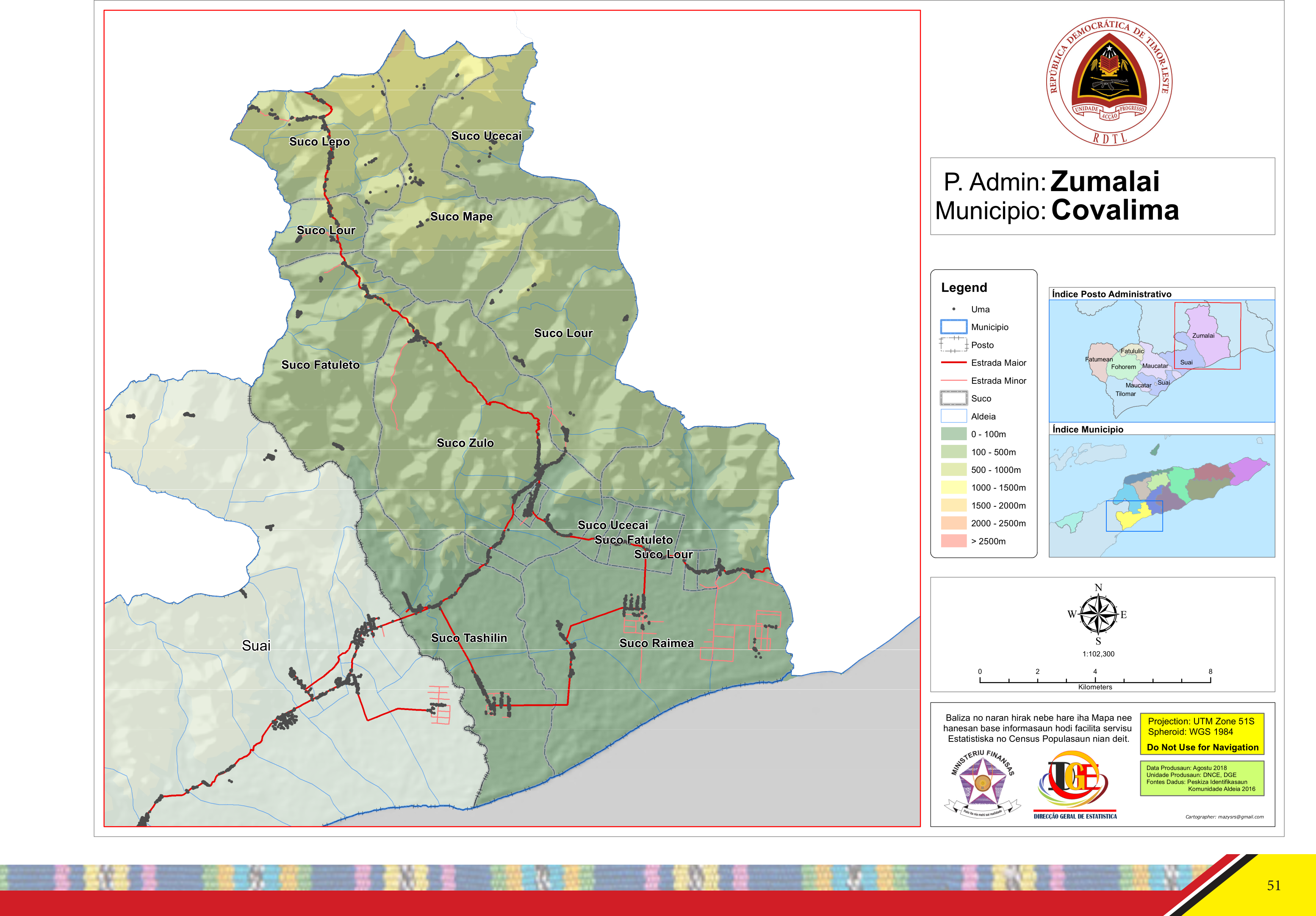
- Official map

- Location within East Timor
- Coordinates: 9°9′S 125°27′E
- Country: East Timor
- Municipality: Cova Lima
- Seat: Tashilin
- Sucos: Fatuleto; Lepo; Lour; Mape; Raimea; Tashilin; Ucecai; Zulo

Area
  - Total: 282.9 km^{2} (109.2 sq mi)

Population (2015 census)
  - Total: 13,263
  - Density: 46.88/km^{2} (121.4/sq mi)

Households (2015 census)
  - Total: 2,419
- Time zone: UTC+09:00 (TLT)

Zumalai, officially Zumalai Administrative Post (Portuguese: Posto Administrativo de Zumalai, Tetun: Postu administrativu Zumalai), is an administrative post (and was formerly a subdistrict) in Cova Lima municipality, East Timor. Its seat or administrative centre is Tashilin.
