= Health in Timor-Leste =

Life expectancy in Timor-Leste at birth was at 60.7 in 2007. The fertility rate is at six births per woman. Healthy life expectancy at birth was at 55 years in 2007.

The Human Rights Measurement Initiative finds that Timor-Leste is fulfilling 74.9% of what it should be fulfilling for the right to health based on its level of income. When looking at the right to health with respect to children, Timor-Leste achieves 93.1% of what is expected based on its current income. In regards to the right to health amongst the adult population, the country achieves 96.2% of what is expected based on the nation's level of income. TImor-Leste falls into the "very bad" category when evaluating the right to reproductive health because the nation is fulfilling only 35.5% of what the nation is expected to achieve based on the resources (income) it has available.

Malnutrition rates in children have reduced but in 2013 still stood at 51%.

The 2010 maternal mortality rate per 100,000 births for Timor-Leste was 370. This compares with 928.6 in 2008 and 1016.3 in 1990. The under-5 mortality rate per 1,000 births is 60 and the neonatal mortality rate per 1,000 live births is 27. The number of midwives per 1,000 live births is 8 and the lifetime risk of death for pregnant women is 1 in 44.

The country has one of the highest smoking rates in the world, with 33% of the population, including 61% of men, smoking daily.

In 2013 only three deaths from malaria were recorded, an achievement recognized by the World Health Organization.

== Healthcare ==
Government expenditure on health was US$150 per person in 2006. There were only two hospitals and 14 village healthcare facilities in 1974. By 1994, there were 11 hospitals and 330 healthcare centres.

Sergio Lobo, a surgeon is the Health Minister. He says that “Many of the health-related issues are outside the competence of the Minister of Health.” Since independence the country has established a medical school, a nursing school, and a midwifery school.

== See also ==
- List of hospitals in Timor-Leste
