= Suai =

- City
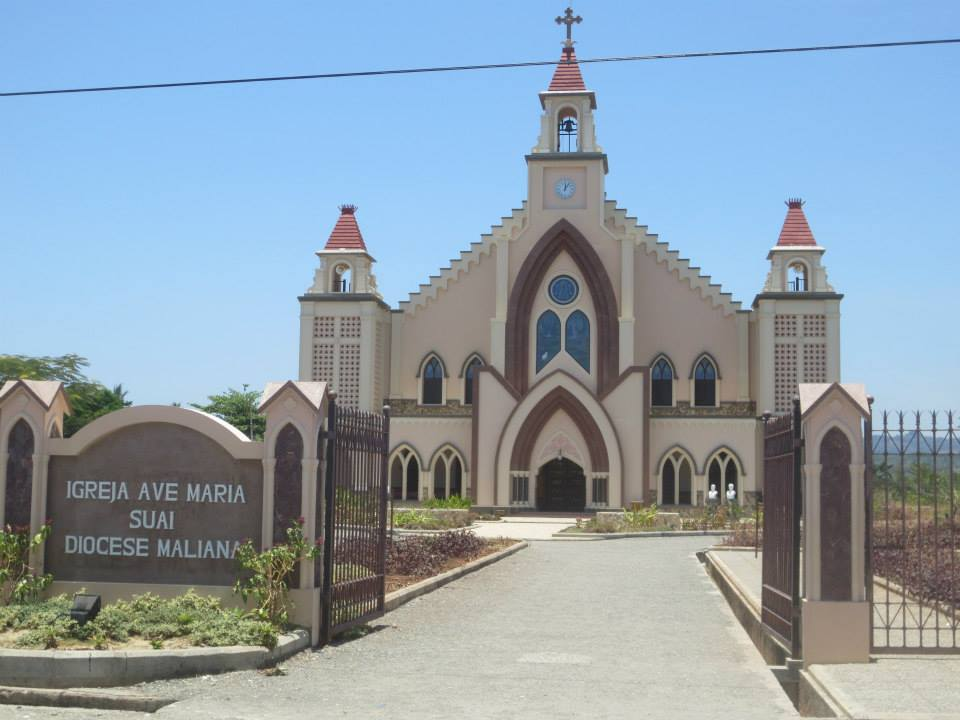
- Ave Maria Church in Suai

- Location in Timor-Leste
- Coordinates: 9°18′45″S 125°15′20″E
- Country: Timor-Leste
- Municipality: Cova Lima
- Administrative post: Suai
- Suco: Debos

Area
  - Total: 302.60 km^{2} (116.83 sq mi)
- Elevation: 13 m (43 ft)

Population (2015 census)
  - Total: 9,866
  - Density: 32.60/km^{2} (84.44/sq mi)
- Time zone: UTC+09:00 (TLT)
- Climate: Aw

Suai is a city in Timor-Leste, in Suai Subdistrict. It has a population of 9,866 and is located 138 kilometres (86 mi) to the southwest of Dili, the national capital. Suai is the capital of the Cova Lima District, which is in the southwest of the country. It is located just a few kilometers from the Timor Sea, on the south side of the island.

Suai was the location of the Suai Church massacre on 6 September 1999. It was one of a number of massacres perpetrated by a pro-Indonesia militia in the time of the Indonesian withdrawal of East Timor.

Following the events of 1999, Suai entered into a friendship program with the City of Port Phillip, a bayside municipality south of Melbourne, Australia. Together they are working towards assisting the community of Suai recover.

Suai is served by Suai Airport which was expanded in 2017. The Suai Referral Hospital is located in the town.

== See also ==
- Suai Prison
