= Suai Administrative Post =

Administrative post in Cova Lima Municipality, Timor-Leste

Suai
- Administrative Post
- Posto Administrativo de Suai (Portuguese); Postu administrativu Suai (Tetun)
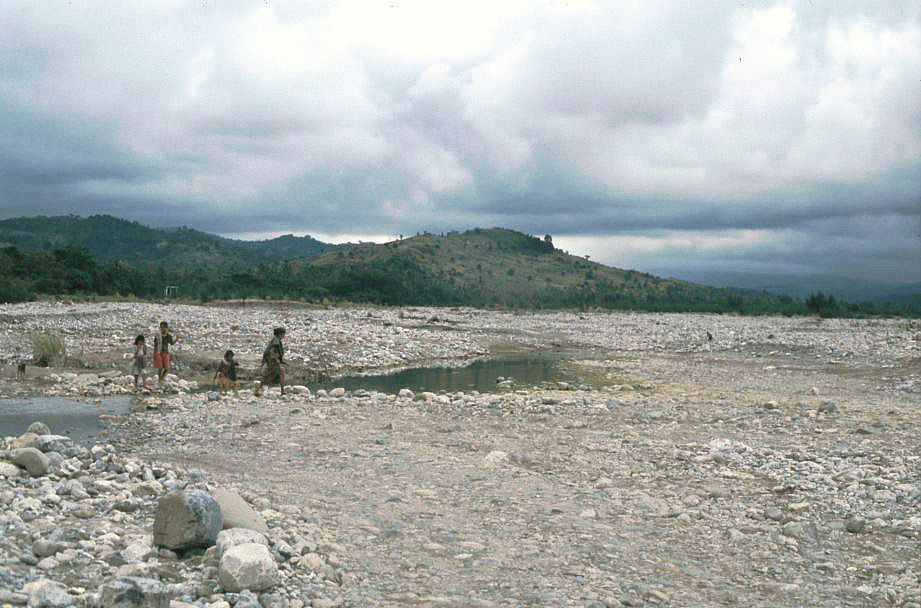
- River bed in Suai

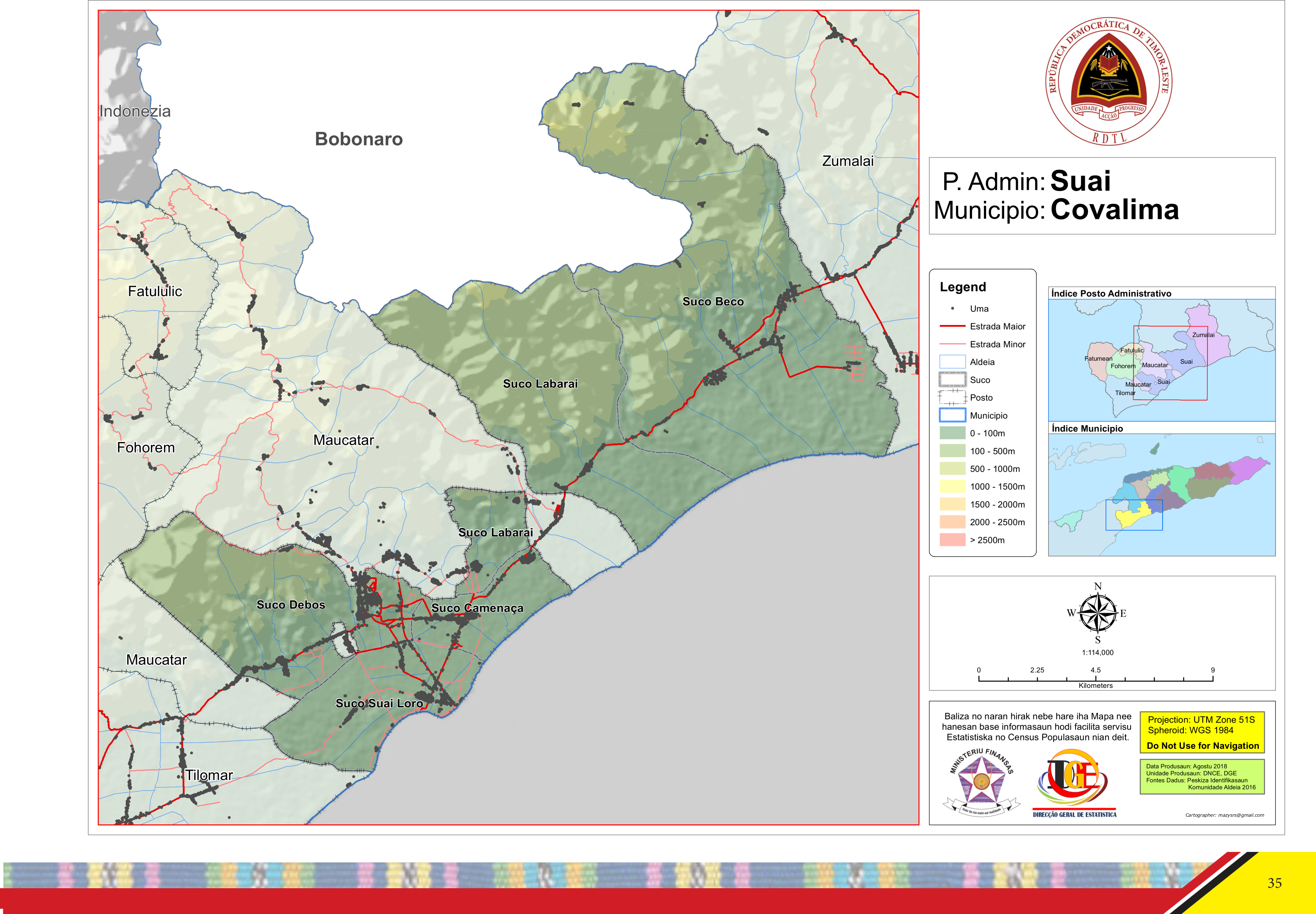
- Official map

- Location within East Timor
- Coordinates: 9°19′S 125°15′E
- Country: Timor-Leste
- Municipality: Cova Lima
- Seat: Camenaça
- Sucos: Beco; Camenaça; Debos; Labarai; Suai Loro

Area
  - Total: 272.8 km^{2} (105.3 sq mi)

Population (2015 census)
  - Total: 25,815
  - Density: 94.63/km^{2} (245.1/sq mi)

Households (2015 census)
  - Total: 4,790
- Time zone: UTC+09:00 (TLT)

Suai, officially Suai Administrative Post (Portuguese: Posto Administrativo de Suai, Tetun: Postu administrativu Suai), is an administrative post (and was formerly a subdistrict) in Cova Lima municipality, Timor-Leste. Its seat or administrative centre is Camenaça.
