= Secondary hospital =

Specialized healthcare facility

A secondary hospital, secondary referral center or a secondary health care refers to a hospital in the United States which can support licensed physicians in pediatrics, obstetrics, and gynecology, general surgery and other supporting medical services. Specifically, these are health care providers that have at least eight beds and some medical and surgical facilities, including obstetrics (birthing center), but not all specialties.

== See also ==
- Tertiary referral hospital
- Health care, Primary care, Secondary care, Tertiary care
