= Cova Lima Municipality =

Municipality of East Timor

Cova Lima
- Municipality of Timor-Leste
- Município Cova Lima (Portuguese); Munisípiu Kovalima (Tetun)
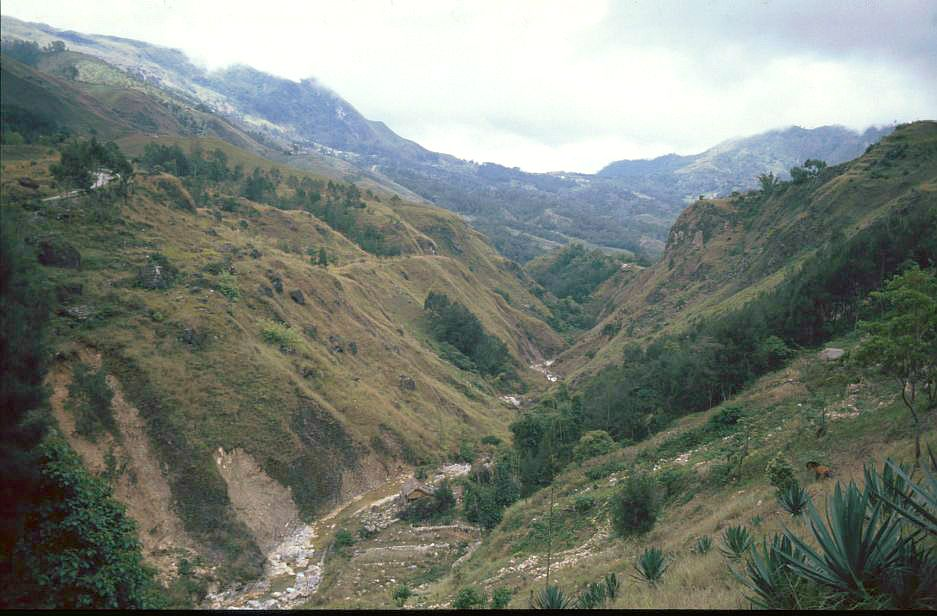
- Mountain area in Cova Lima

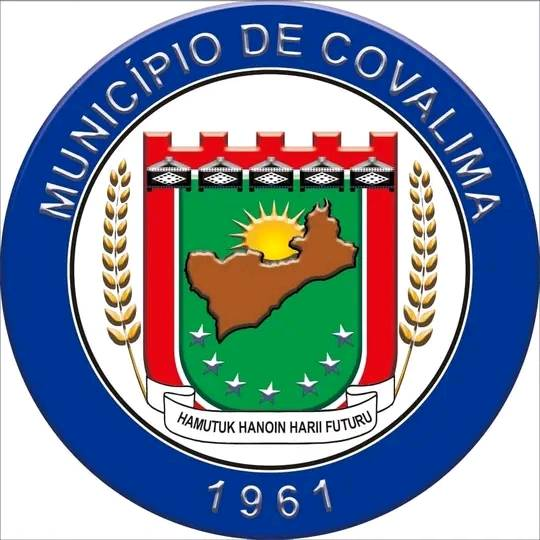
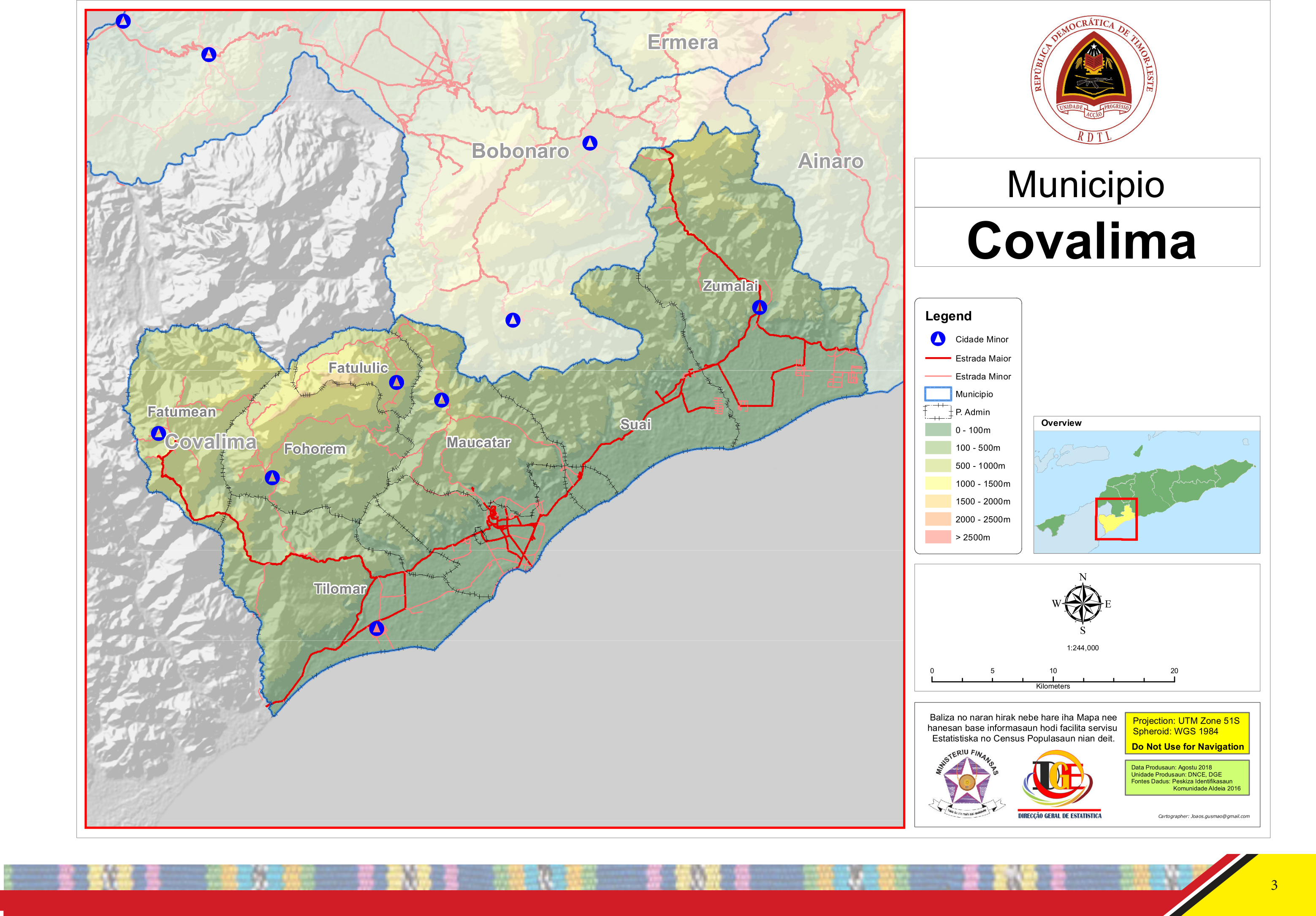
- Seal Official map

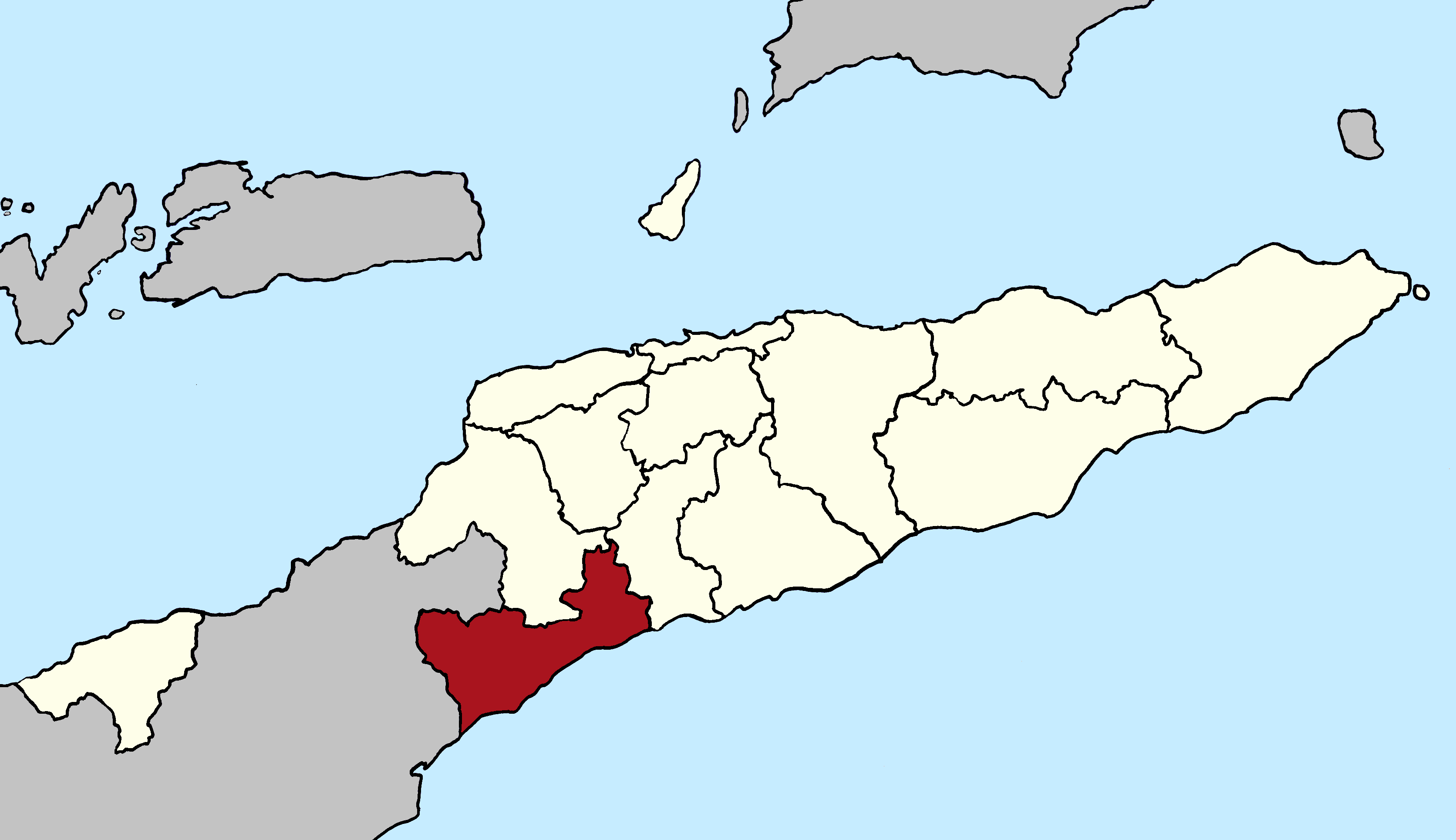
- Cova Lima in Timor-Leste
- Interactive map of Cova Lima
- Coordinates: 9°19′S 125°15′E
- Country: Timor-Leste
- Capital: Suai
- Administrative posts: Fatululic; Fatumean; Fohorem; Zumalai; Maucatar; Suai; Tilomar

Area
  - Total: 1,198.6 km^{2} (462.8 sq mi)
  - Rank: 7th

Population (2015 census)
  - Total: 65,301
  - Rank: 9th
  - Density: 54.481/km^{2} (141.11/sq mi)
  - Rank: 9th

Households (2015 census)
  - Total: 12,564
  - Rank: 8th
- Time zone: UTC+09:00 (TLT)
- ISO 3166 code: TL-CO
- HDI (2017): 0.618 medium · 3rd
- Website: Cova Lima Municipality

Cova Lima (Portuguese: Município Cova Lima, Tetun: Munisípiu Kovalima) is a municipality of Timor-Leste, in the Southwest part of the country. It has a population of 59,455 (Census 2010) and an area of 1,230 km^{2}. The capital of the municipality is Suai, which lies 136 km from Dili, the national capital.

== Toponymy ==
There are two different explanations for the municipality's name. First, it could be derived from the combination of koba (a basket used for ritual acts) and lima, the Tetun word for 'five'. The combination is said to represent either the five mythical daughters of the Liurai (traditional title of a Timorese ruler) of Fohorem Nutetu, or the five kingdoms consisting of Fatumea, Dakolo, Lookeu, Sisi and Maudemi.

According to a second explanation, the English language name of the municipality is said to be a Portuguese approximation of the combination kaua lima or portmanteau Kaualima, each of which means 'five crows' in Tetun.

It has been asserted that the Portuguese name, perhaps intentionally, has a symbolically derogatory meaning, namely 'Five Graves' or 'Five Holes', as the Portuguese word cova means 'grave' or 'hole'. According to that assertion, the Portuguese name may also be a "... form of cultural and mind de-colonization ..." [sic - colonization] of the local name.

== Geography ==
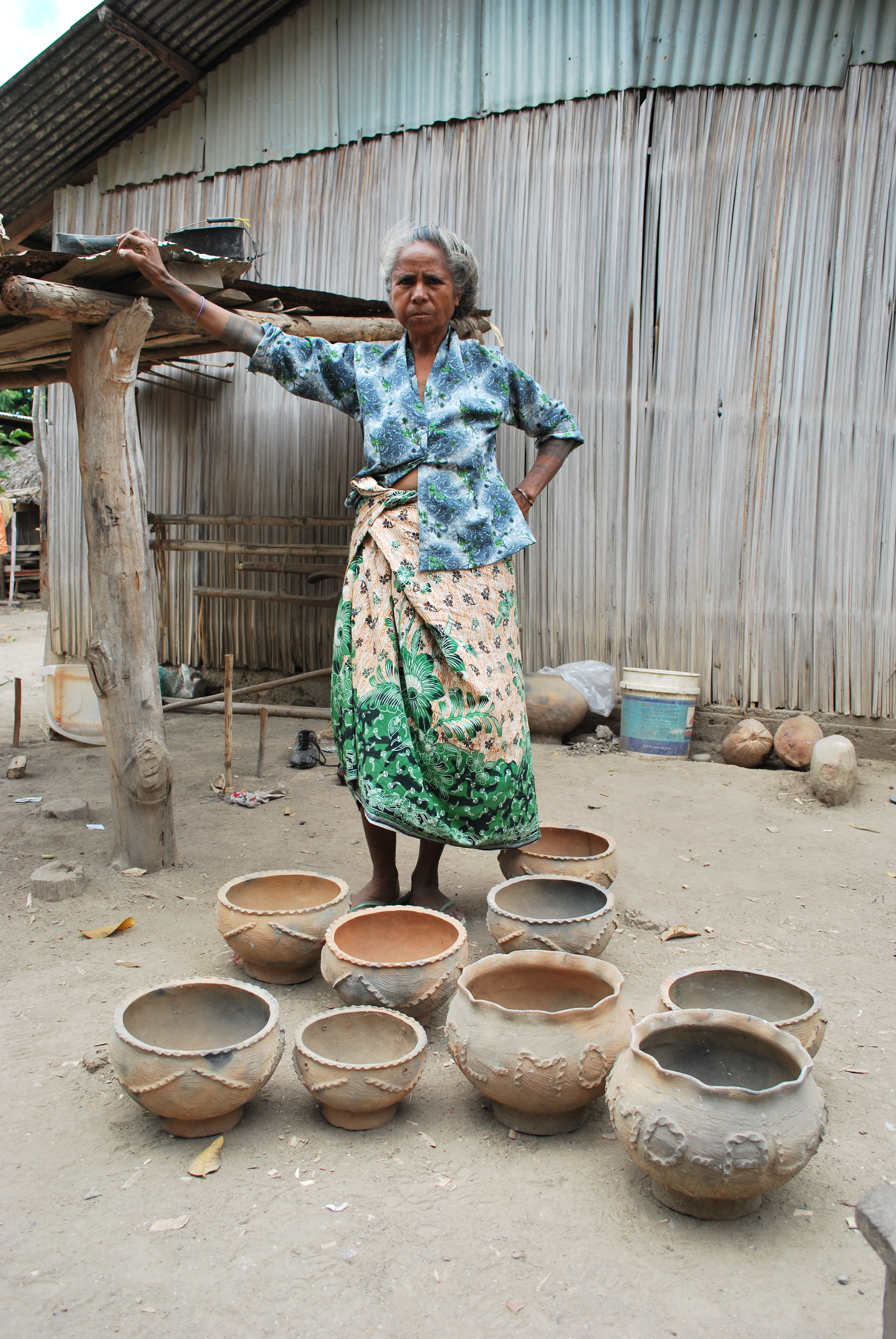
Woman with pottery in Cova Lima

Cova Lima borders the Timor Sea to the south, the municipalities of Bobonaro to the north, Ainaro to the east, and the Indonesian province of East Nusa Tenggara to the west.

== Administrative posts ==
The administrative posts of Cova Lima are Fatululic, Fatumean, Fohorem, Zumalai, Maucatar, Suai, and Tilomar.
