= Tilomar Important Bird Area =

Coordinates: 09°20′00″S 125°12′00″E

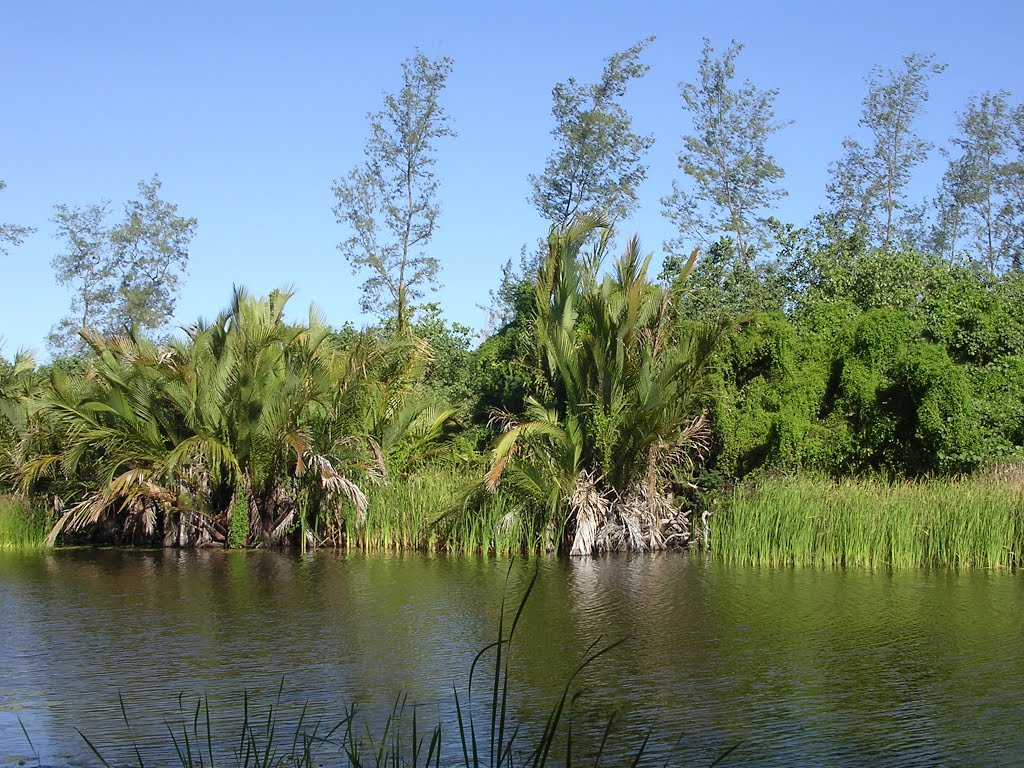
Asan Foun freshwater lagoon, Tilomar

The Tilomar Important Bird Area, also known as Tilomar Forest, is a tract of mainly forested land in Timor-Leste, a country occupying the eastern end of the island of Timor in the Lesser Sunda Islands of Wallacea.

== Description ==
The IBA comprises some 227 km^{2} of forests and wetlands in Tilomar Subdistrict, Cova Lima District, some 100 km south-west of the national capital, Dili, near the southern Timor Sea coast of the island not far from the border with Indonesia.

It ranges in elevation from sea level up to about 1000 m. The principal natural habitat is tropical deciduous forest on limestone hills, with perennial springs at the foot of the hills supporting patches of tropical evergreen forest.

Although most of the coastal forests have been cleared for agriculture, the IBA includes a small freshwater lagoon as well as saline coastal lagoons.

== Birds ==
The site has been identified by BirdLife International as an Important Bird Area (IBA) because it supports populations of bar-necked cuckoo-doves, black cuckoo-doves, Wetar ground doves, pink-headed imperial pigeons, yellow-crested cockatoos, jonquil parrots, cinnamon-banded kingfishers, streak-breasted honeyeaters, Timor friarbirds, black-breasted myzomelas, plain gerygones, fawn-breasted whistlers, green figbirds, olive-brown orioles, Timor stubtails, buff-banded thicketbirds, Timor leaf warblers, spot-breasted heleias, orange-sided thrushes, white-bellied bush chats, black-banded flycatchers, Timor blue flycatchers, blue-cheeked flowerpeckers, flame-breasted sunbirds, tricoloured parrotfinches and Timor sparrows.

== See also ==
- List of Important Bird Areas in Timor-Leste
