= Mount Mak Fahik and Mount Sarim Important Bird Area =

Coordinates: 08°53′00″S 126°01′00″E

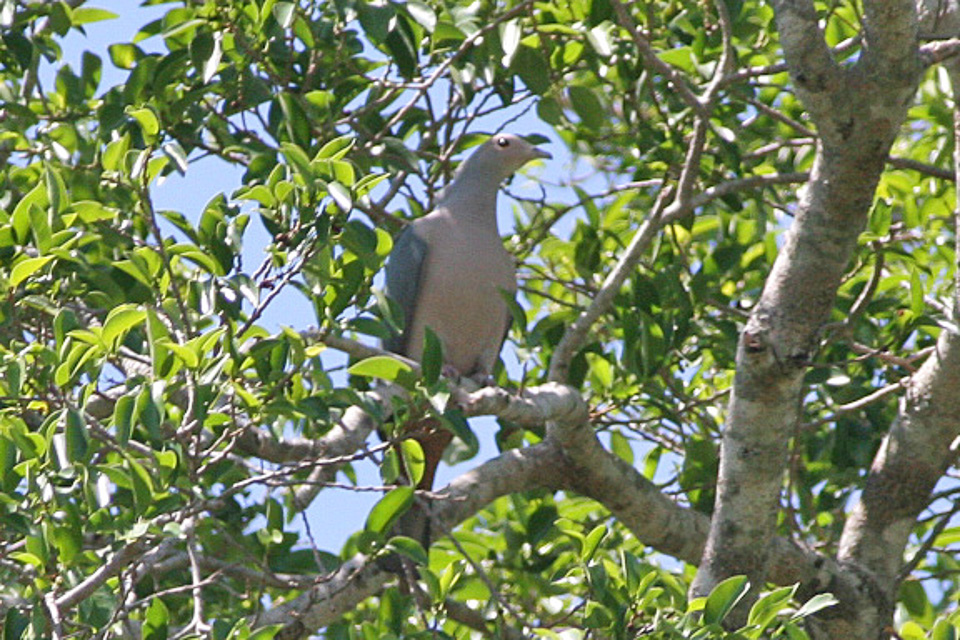
The IBA is an important site for pink-headed imperial pigeons

The Mount Mak Fahik and Mount Sarim Important Bird Area is a tract of mountainous land in Timor-Leste, a country occupying the eastern end of the island of Timor in the Lesser Sunda Islands of Wallacea.

== Description ==
The IBA comprises 2961 ha of tropical dry forest some 65 km south-east of the national capital, Dili, in the Manatuto District. The forest occurs around the higher levels, at elevations of 400–1000 m, of the mountains of Mak Fahik and Sarim in the central spine of the island. Some areas of the site are threatened by repeated burning and clearance for maize and tobacco crops.

== Birds ==
The site has been identified by BirdLife International as an Important Bird Area because it supports significant populations of bar-necked cuckoo-doves, black cuckoo-doves, Timor green pigeons, pink-headed imperial pigeons, yellow-crested cockatoos, olive-headed lorikeets, jonquil parrots, cinnamon-banded kingfishers, streak-breasted honeyeaters, Timor friarbirds, flame-eared honeyeaters, black-breasted myzomelas, plain gerygones, fawn-breasted whistlers, green figbirds, olive-brown orioles, Timor stubtails, buff-banded thicketbirds, Timor leaf warblers, spot-breasted heleias, orange-sided thrushes, white-bellied bush chats, black-banded flycatchers, Timor blue flycatchers, blue-cheeked flowerpeckers, flame-breasted sunbirds and tricoloured parrotfinches.

== See also ==
- List of Important Bird Areas in Timor-Leste
