= Sungai Clere Important Bird Area =

Coordinates: 09°04′00″S 125°58′00″E

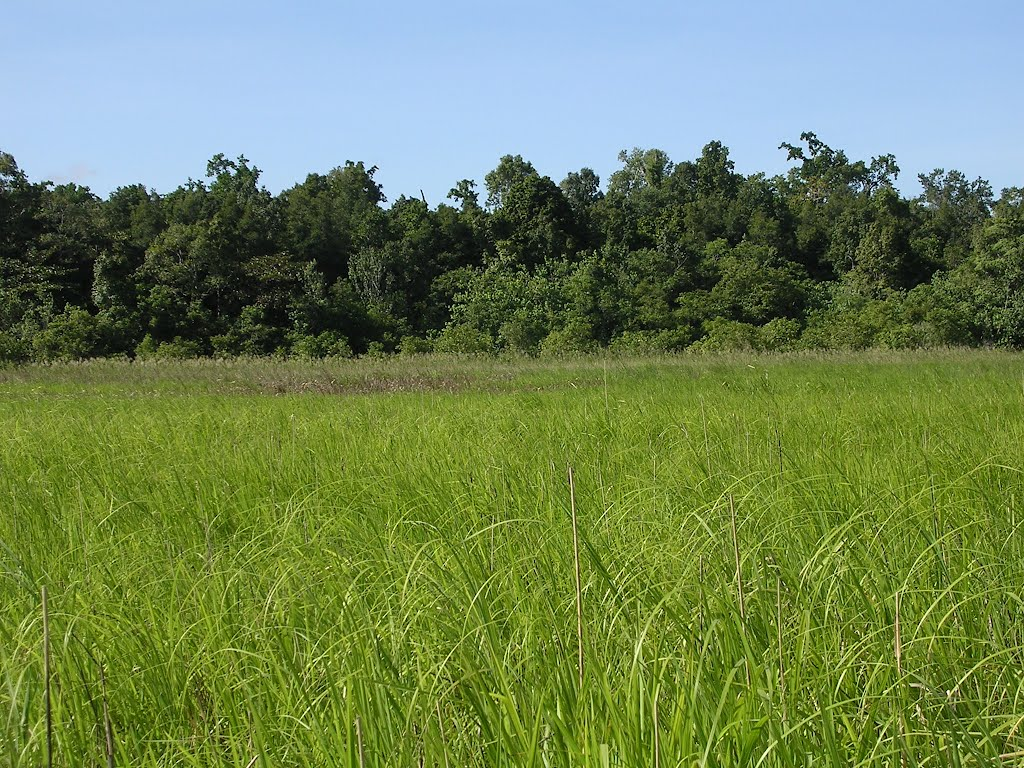
Swampland and grassland at Sungai Clere

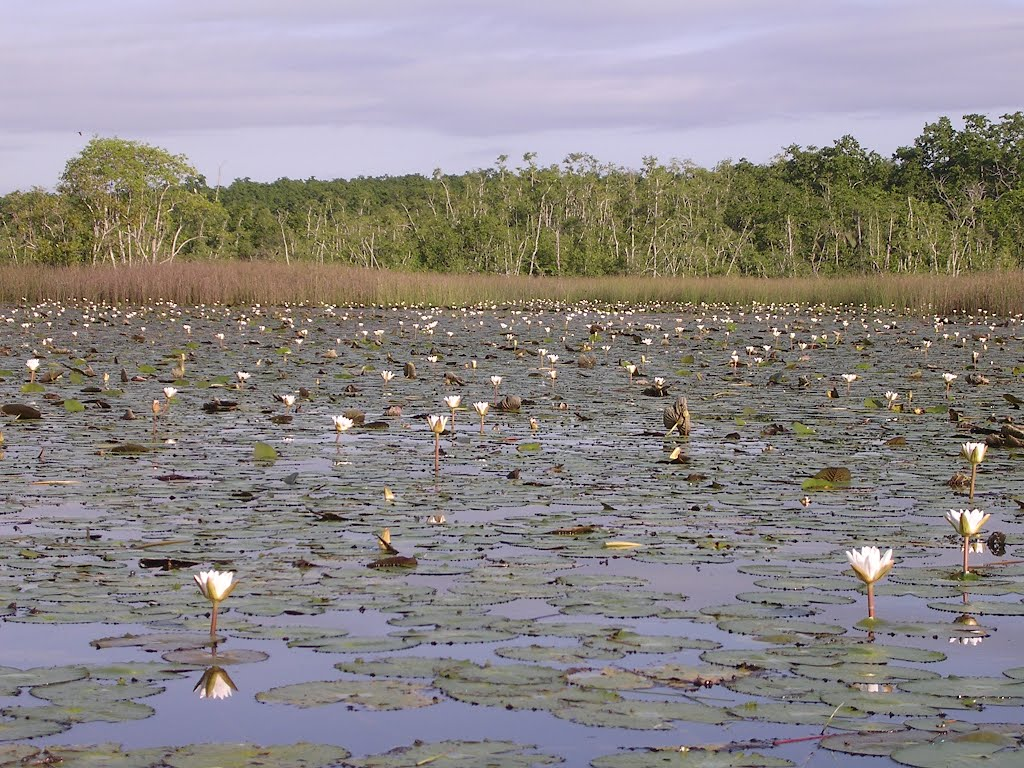
Waterlilies on Lake Modo Mahut

The Sungai Clere Important Bird Area, also known as the Sungai Clere Protected Wildlife Area, and in Indonesian as Hutan Metiboat, is a tract of low-lying forest and grassland in Timor-Leste, a country occupying the eastern end of the island of Timor in the Lesser Sunda Islands of Wallacea.

== Description ==
The IBA comprises some 423 km^{2} of forests, grasslands and wetlands bordering the southern coast of the island, some 75 km south-east of the national capital, Dili, in the Manufahi District. Habitats include dry forest, Canarium dominated freshwater swamp forest and the 1000 ha freshwater Lake Modo Mahut, with extensive areas of savannah grassland converted from alluvial forest.

== Birds ==
The site has been identified by BirdLife International as an Important Bird Area (IBA) because it supports populations of bar-necked cuckoo-doves, black cuckoo-doves, Timor green pigeons, pink-headed imperial pigeons, yellow-crested cockatoos, olive-headed lorikeets, iris lorikeets, jonquil parrots, streak-breasted honeyeaters, Timor friarbirds, black-breasted myzomelas, plain gerygones, fawn-breasted whistlers, green figbirds, olive-brown orioles, Timor stubtails, buff-banded thicketbirds, Timor leaf warblers, orange-sided thrushes, white-bellied bush chats, black-banded flycatchers, Timor blue flycatchers, blue-cheeked flowerpeckers, flame-breasted sunbirds, tricoloured parrotfinches and Timor sparrows.

== See also ==
- List of Important Bird Areas in Timor-Leste
