= Loré Important Bird Area =

Coordinates: 8°40′00″S 127°00′00″E

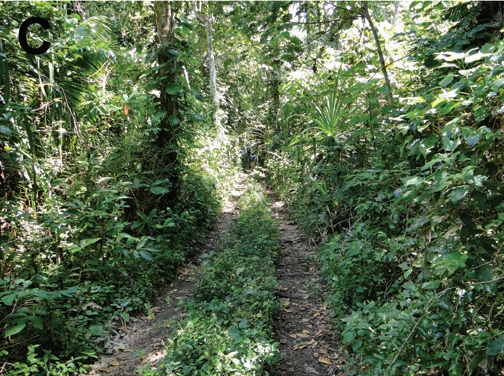
Lowland tropical evergreen forest near Loré

The Loré Important Bird Area is a 10,906 ha tract of land in Timor-Leste, a country occupying the eastern end of the island of Timor in the Lesser Sunda Islands of Wallacea. It forms the south-westernmost part of the Nino Konis Santana National Park.

== Description ==
The IBA encompasses the vicinity of the village of Loré on the southern coast of the Lautém District. In elevation it ranges from sea level to about 500 m. It contains several plant communities including tropical, lowland evergreen forest, tropical dry forest and moist deciduous forest, mangroves, and coastal strand vegetation, forming the largest assemblage of such habitats on the island. It is surrounded by teak plantations, rice paddies and shifting cultivation.

== Birds ==
The site has been identified by BirdLife International as an Important Bird Area because it supports significant populations of bar-necked cuckoo-doves, black cuckoo-doves, Timor green pigeons, pink-headed imperial pigeons, yellow-crested cockatoos, jonquil parrots, cinnamon-banded kingfishers, streak-breasted honeyeaters, Timor friarbirds, flame-eared honeyeaters, black-breasted myzomelas, plain gerygones, fawn-breasted whistlers, green figbirds, olive-brown orioles, Timor stubtails, Timor leaf warblers, spot-breasted heleias, orange-sided thrushes, white-bellied bush chats, black-banded flycatchers, Timor blue flycatchers, blue-cheeked flowerpeckers, flame-breasted sunbirds and tricoloured parrotfinches.

== See also ==
- List of Important Bird Areas in Timor-Leste
