= Fatumasin =

- Gunung Maelulu
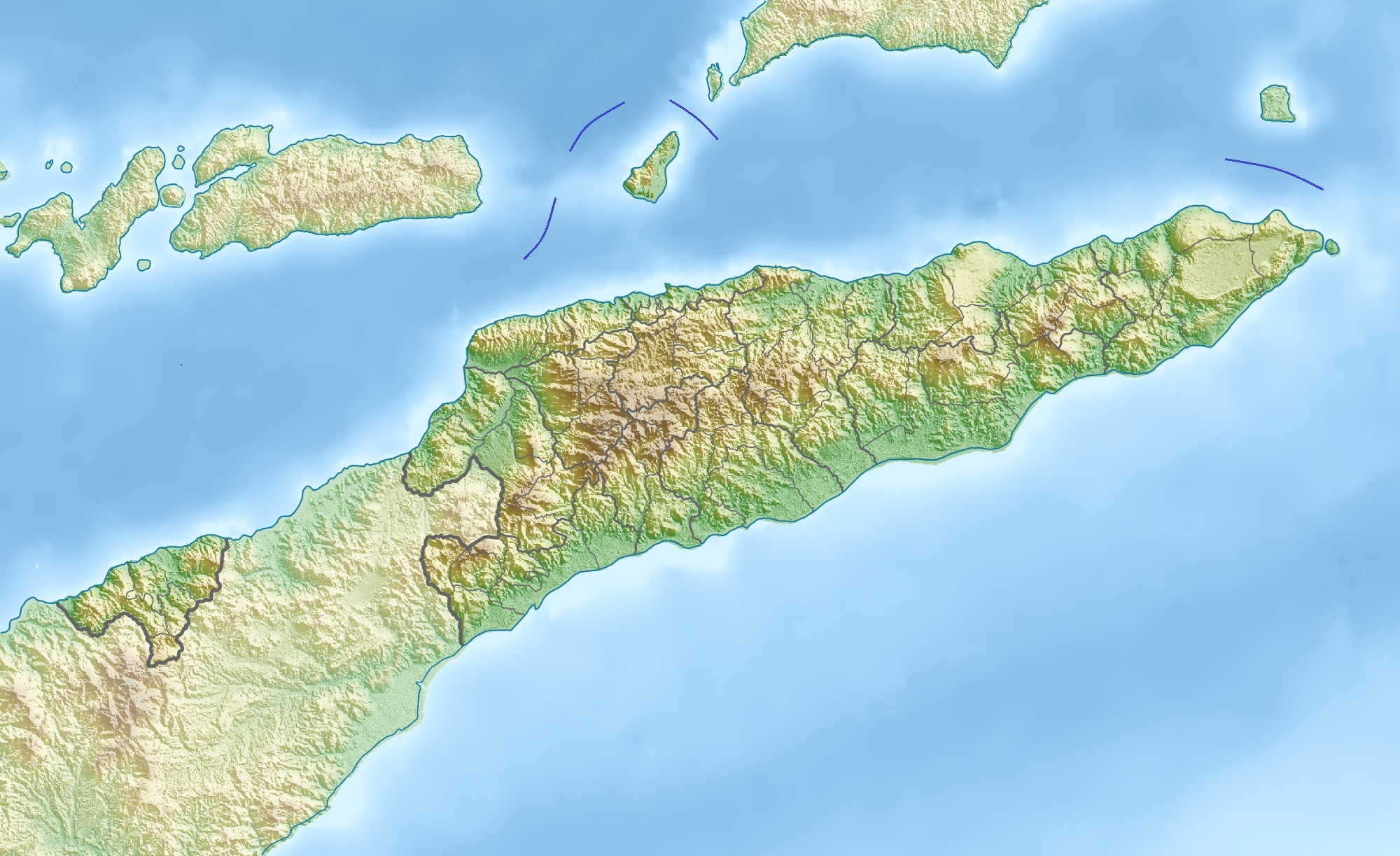
- Location within East Timor

Highest point
- Elevation: 1,369 m (4,491 ft)
- Coordinates: 08°40′00″S 125°22′00″E

Geography
- Location: Liquiçá District, Timor-Leste

Fatumasin is a mountain in the district of Liquiçá in Timor-Leste, a country occupying the eastern end of the island of Timor in the Lesser Sunda Islands of Wallacea. The surrounding forest is called Hutan Gunung Maelulu in Indonesian. It is a 13,618 ha mountain forest (or forested mountain) and forms one of the country's Important Bird Areas.

== Description ==
The mountain stands about 26 km south-west of the national capital of Dili. The forest ranges in elevation from about 800 m upwards to the 1369 m summit. The underlying rocks are non-calcareous and the forest is considered to be more species-rich than most others on the island.

== Birds ==
The site has been identified by BirdLife International as an Important Bird Area (IBA) because it supports populations of bar-necked cuckoo-doves, pink-headed imperial pigeons, yellow-crested cockatoos, jonquil parrots, streak-breasted honeyeaters, Timor friarbirds, black-breasted myzomelas, plain gerygones, fawn-breasted whistlers, green figbirds, olive-brown orioles, Timor stubtails, Timor leaf warblers, orange-sided thrushes, Timor blue flycatchers, blue-cheeked flowerpeckers and flame-breasted sunbirds.

== See also ==
- List of Important Bird Areas in Timor-Leste
