= Maubara Important Bird Area =

Coordinates: 8°36′00″S 125°15′00″E

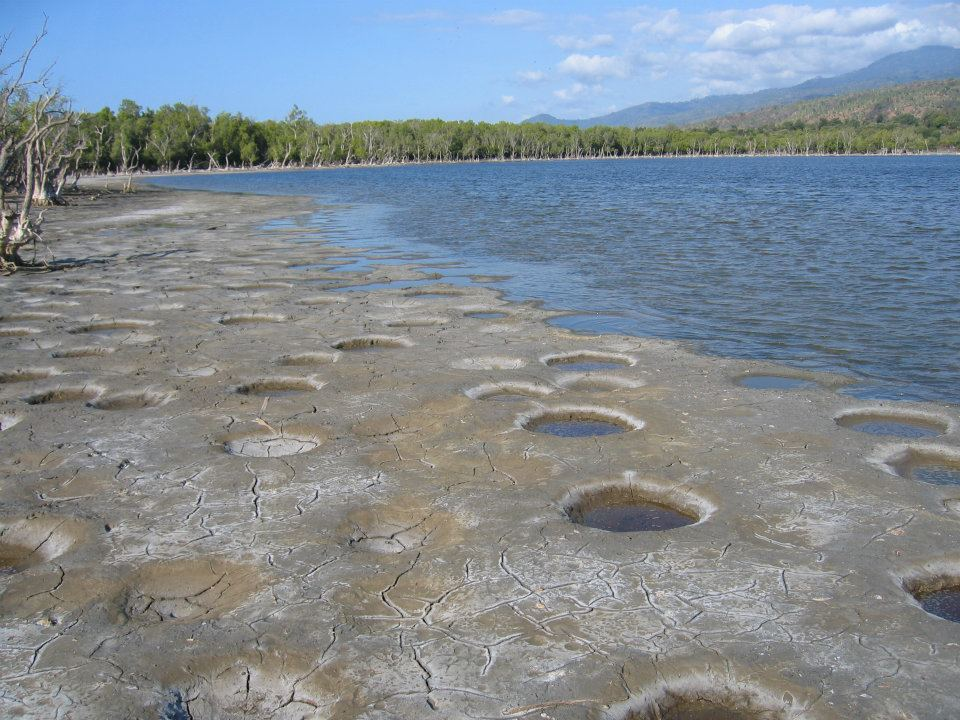
Lake Maubara

The Maubara Important Bird Area is a 5292 ha tract of land in Timor-Leste, a country occupying the eastern end of the island of Timor in the Lesser Sunda Islands of Wallacea.

== Description ==
The IBA lies on the northern coast of the island, 37 km west of the national capital, Dili, near the village of Maubara in the Liquiçá District. In elevation it ranges from sea level in the north to about 500 m in the hills to the south. It encompasses the small (8 ha), coastal Lake Maubara, as well as dense stands of Corypha palm woodland on alluvial soils behind the beach, and intact tropical dry forest extending several kilometres inland from the coast.

== Birds ==
The site has been identified by BirdLife International as an Important Bird Area because it supports populations of bar-necked cuckoo-doves, pink-headed imperial pigeons, jonquil parrots, streak-breasted honeyeaters, Timor friarbirds, plain gerygones, fawn-breasted whistlers, green figbirds, olive-brown orioles, white-bellied bush chats, blue-cheeked flowerpeckers, flame-breasted sunbirds and Timor sparrows.

== See also ==
- List of Important Bird Areas in Timor-Leste
