= Subaun =

Important Bird Area in Timor-Leste

Coordinates: 8°29′00″S 125°56′00″E

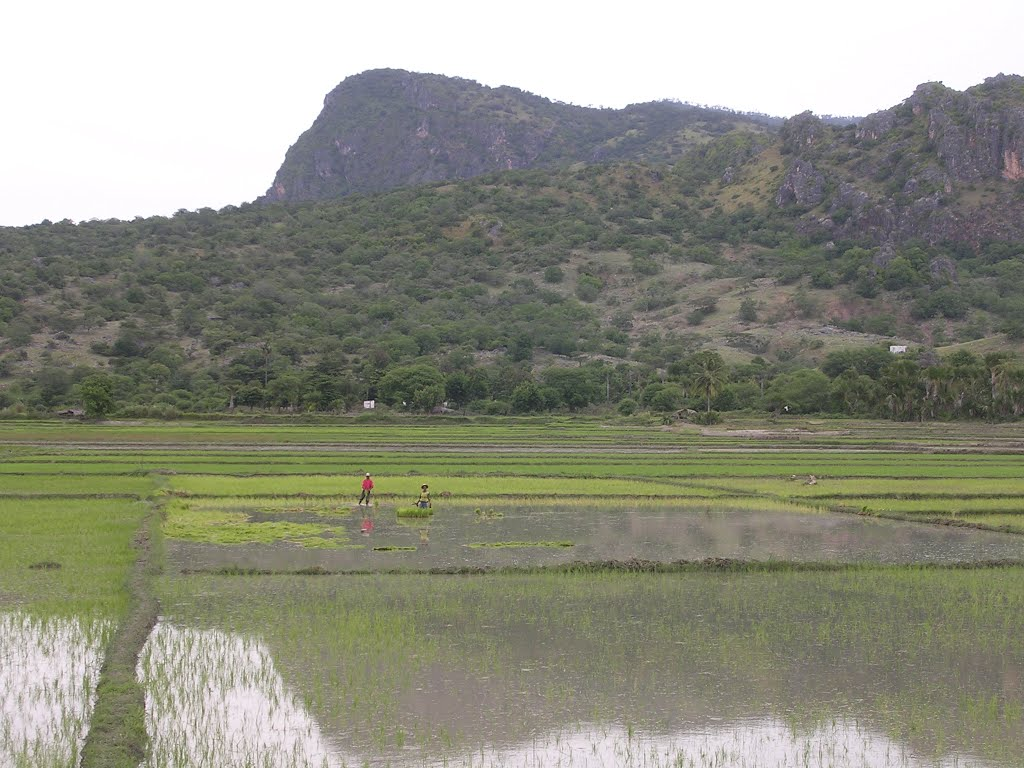
Mount Curi, with rice paddies in the foreground

Subaun is a 23,665 ha (58,480 acres) Important Bird Area (IBA) in Timor-Leste, a country occupying the eastern end of the island of Timor in the Lesser Sunda Islands of Wallacea.

== Description ==
The IBA lies on the northern side of the island, between the national capital, Dili, and the town of Manatuto. In elevation it ranges from sea level to about 1300 m. It comprises a range of steep hills, peaking at Mount Curi, covered by eucalypt savanna woodland with an understorey of mainly Themeda and Heteropogon grasses. The woodland is dominated by Eucalyptus alba at the lower levels and Eucalyptus urophylla above 400 m. Relatively small patches of tropical dry forest or semi-evergreen forest occur in sheltered areas. The grassland is burnt regularly (at intervals of 1–3 years) and the area is used for shifting cultivation.

== Birds ==
The site has been identified by BirdLife International as an Important Bird Area because it supports populations of bar-necked cuckoo-doves, pink-headed imperial pigeons, olive-headed lorikeets, flame-eared honeyeaters, streak-breasted honeyeaters, Timor friarbirds, black-breasted myzomelas, plain gerygones, fawn-breasted whistlers, green figbirds, olive-brown orioles, blue-cheeked flowerpeckers, flame-breasted sunbirds and Timor sparrows.

== See also ==
- List of Important Bird Areas in Timor-Leste
