= Mount Diatuto =

Mountain in Timor-Leste

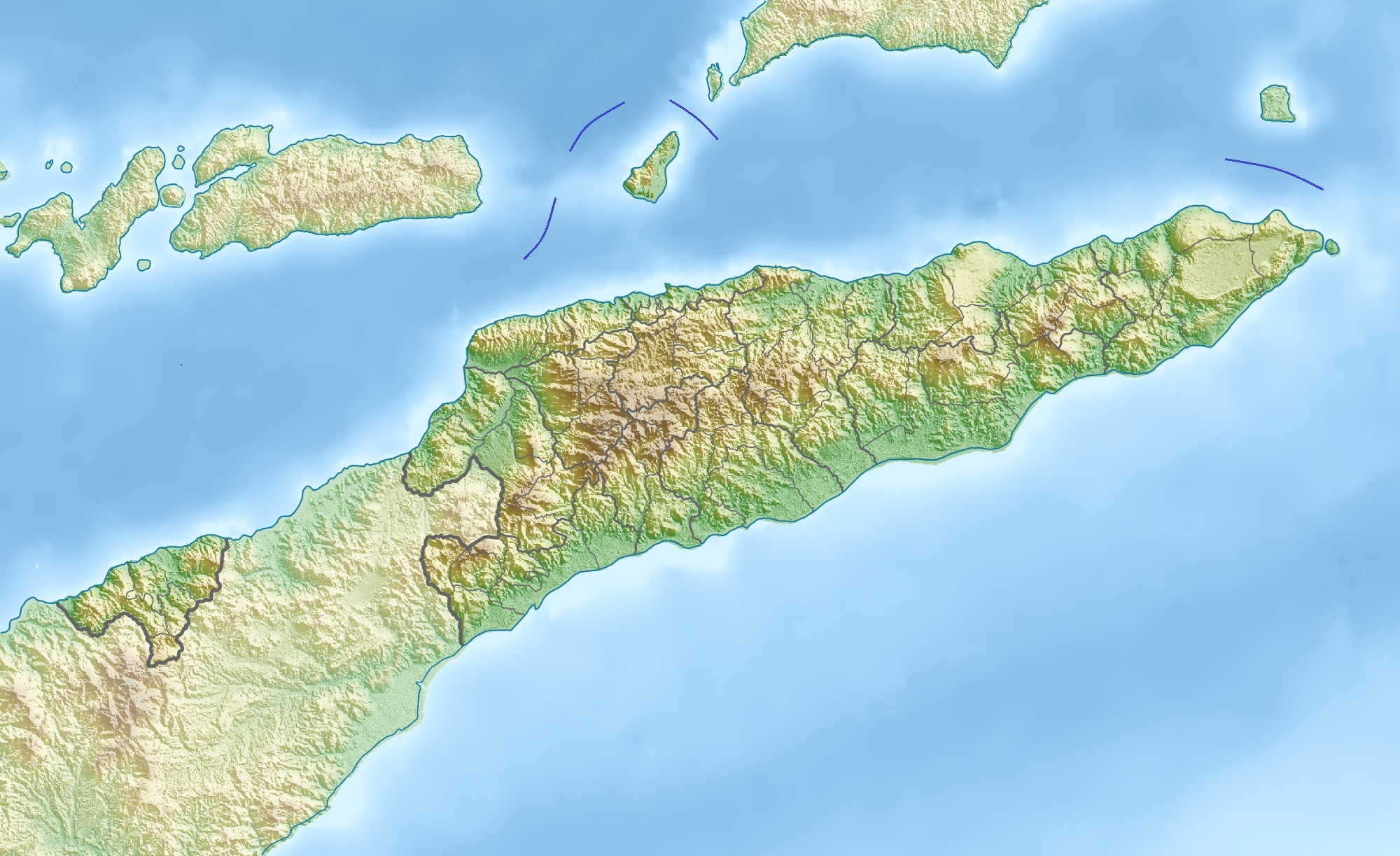
- Location within East Timor

Highest point
- Elevation: 1,770 m (5,810 ft)
- Coordinates: 08°49′00″S 125°51′00″E

Geography
- Location: Manatuto District, Timor-Leste

Mount Diatuto is a mountain in Timor-Leste, a country occupying the eastern end of the island of Timor in the Lesser Sunda Islands of Wallacea.

== Description ==
Mount Diatuto, at an elevation of 1770 m, is the highest point in an area of steep hills and ridges on the central spine of the island in the Manatuto District, about 42 km south-east of the national capital, Dili. The mountain is covered by, and surrounded with, a 345 km^{2} forested area on ultrabasic rocks, formerly known in Indonesian as Hutan Querelau Lauberio. It is characterised by a somewhat stunted vegetation of what was originally semi-evergreen monsoon forest, now degraded and mainly confined to the higher ridges, with eucalypt woodland subject to grazing elsewhere.

== Birds ==
The site has been identified by BirdLife International as an Important Bird Area (IBA) because it supports populations of bar-necked cuckoo-doves, Timor green pigeons, pink-headed imperial pigeons, yellow-crested cockatoos, olive-headed lorikeets, Jonquil parrots, Timor friarbirds, flame-eared honeyeaters, plain gerygones, olive-brown orioles, Timor stubtails, Timor leaf warblers, spot-breasted heleias, chestnut-backed thrushes and orange-sided thrushes.

== See also ==
- List of Important Bird Areas in Timor-Leste
