= Ombai-Wetar Strait =

Ombai-Wetar Strait may refer:

- in part, to Ombai Strait, which separates the Alor Archipelago from the islands of Wetar, Atauro, and Timor in the Lesser Sunda Islands
- in part, to Wetar Strait, which separates the island of Wetar from the eastern part of the island of Timor
- to the combination of those two straits
