= Manucoco =

Mountain in Atauro, Timor-Leste

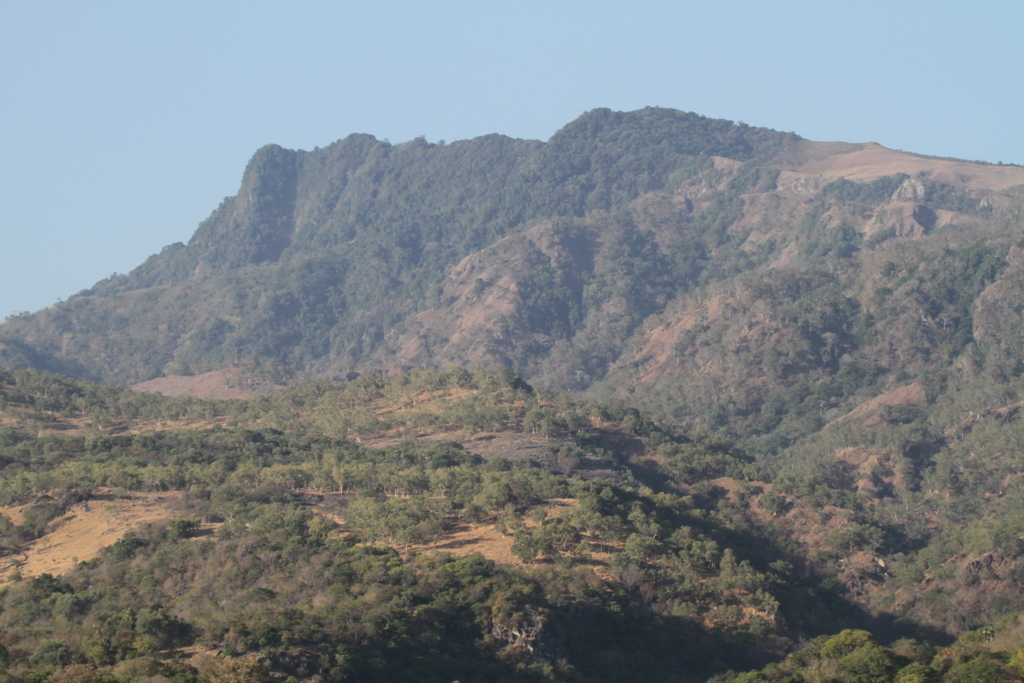
- View of Manucoco

Highest point
- Elevation: 995 m (3,264 ft)
- Coordinates: 8°16′14″S 125°34′28″E

Geography
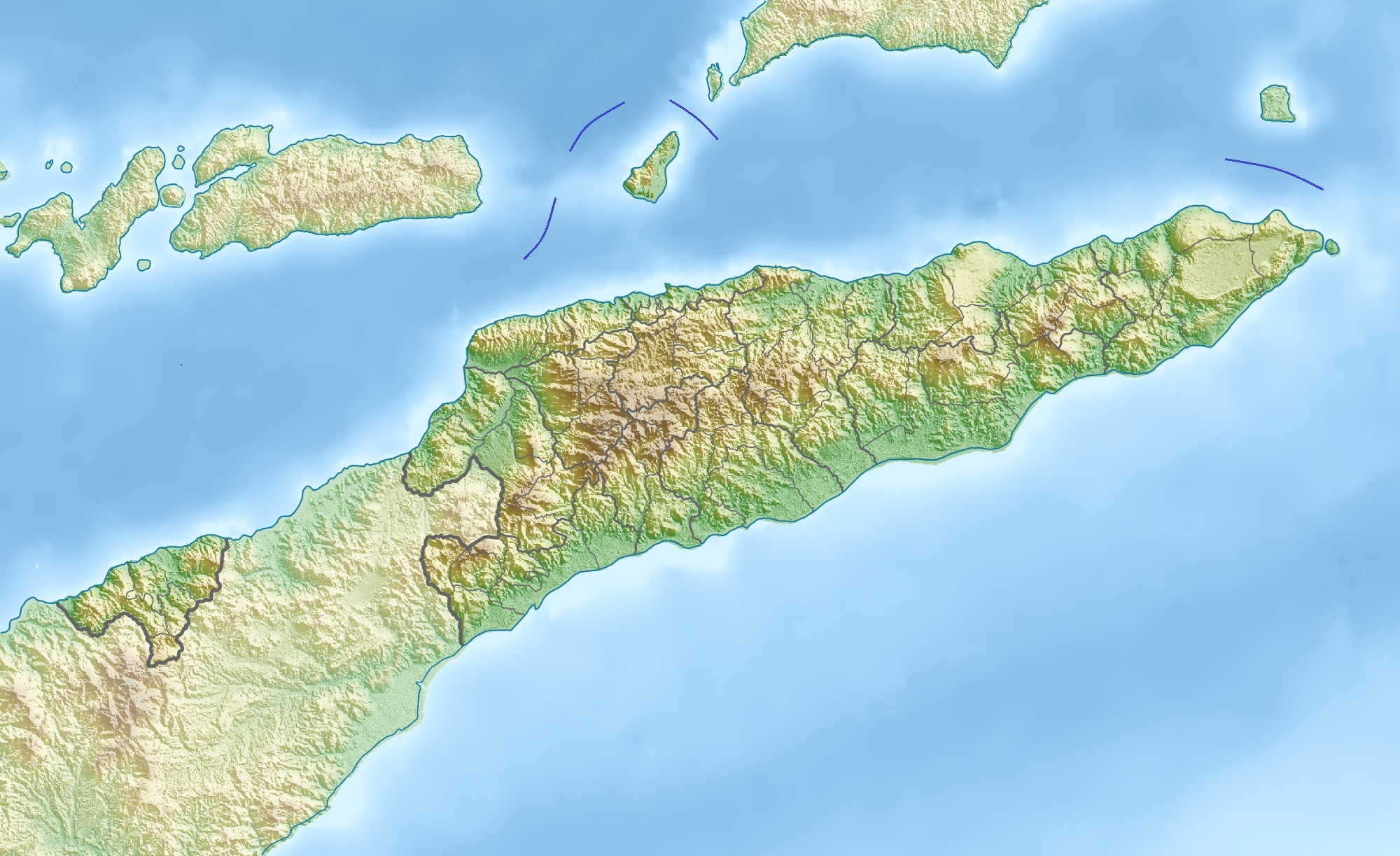
- Location within East Timor
- Location: Atauro Island, Timor-Leste

Manucoco, also referred to as Gunung Manucoco or Mount Manucoco, is a mountain in the municipality Atauro of Timor-Leste. It stands near the southern end of Atauro Island, at the western end of Wetar Strait, some 25 km (16 mi) north of Dili, the nation's capital. The rugged topography of the island's highlands is a result of the erosion of uplifted, originally submarine, volcanoes from the Neogene period creating narrow, dissected ridges and steep slopes, with Manucoco forming the highest point. The upper levels of the mountain (above an elevation of 995 m (3,264 ft)) still carry patches of tropical semi-evergreen mountain forest in sheltered valleys, covering about 40 km^{2} (15 sq mi). The mountain, along with the whole of Atauro Island, has been identified as an Important Bird Area by BirdLife International because it supports populations of several of Timor’s and Wetar's restricted-range native bird species.
