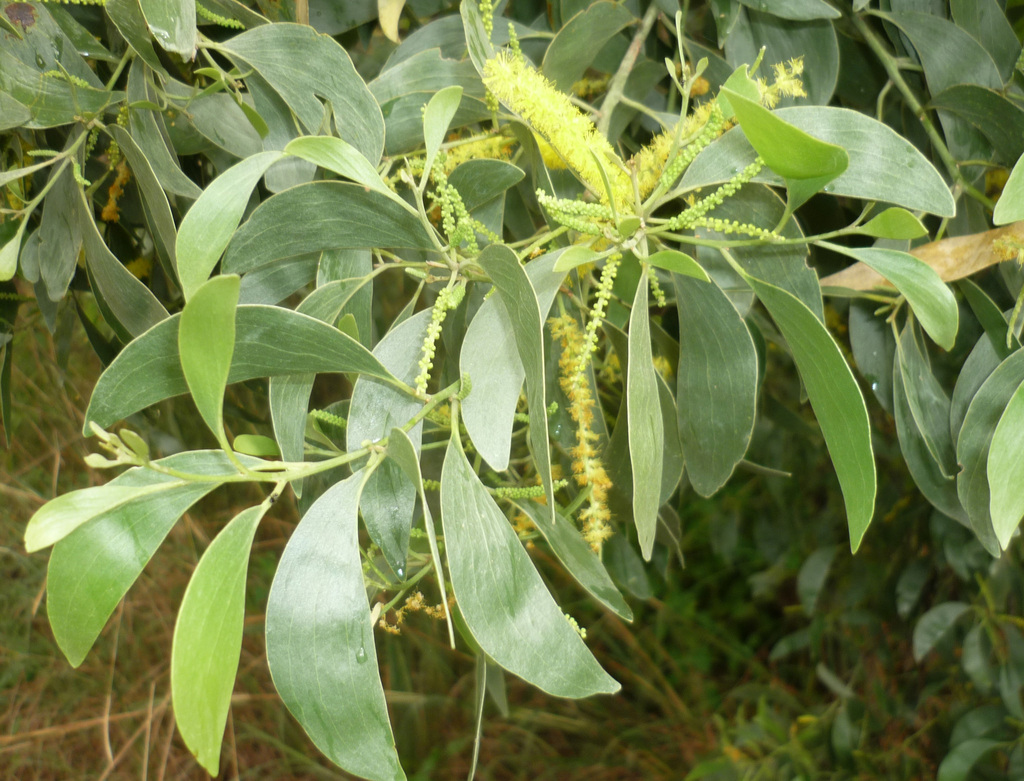

Conservation status
- Vulnerable (IUCN 3.1)

Scientific classification
- Kingdom: Plantae
- Clade: Embryophytes
- Clade: Tracheophytes
- Clade: Spermatophytes
- Clade: Angiosperms
- Clade: Eudicots
- Clade: Rosids
- Order: Fabales
- Family: Fabaceae
- Subfamily: Caesalpinioideae
- Clade: Mimosoid clade
- Genus: Acacia
- Species: A. wetarensis

Binomial name
- Acacia wetarensis Pedley

= Acacia wetarensis =

Species of legume

Acacia wetarensis is a shrub belonging to the genus Acacia and the subgenus Juliflorae that is native to the Indonesian island of Wetar and Atauro Island of Timor-Leste in the Lesser Sunda Islands.

== See also ==
- List of Acacia species
