= Wetar Strait =

Strait in Southeast Asia

- Selat Wetar (Indonesian); Estreito de Wetar (Portuguese); Estreitu Wetar (Tetum)
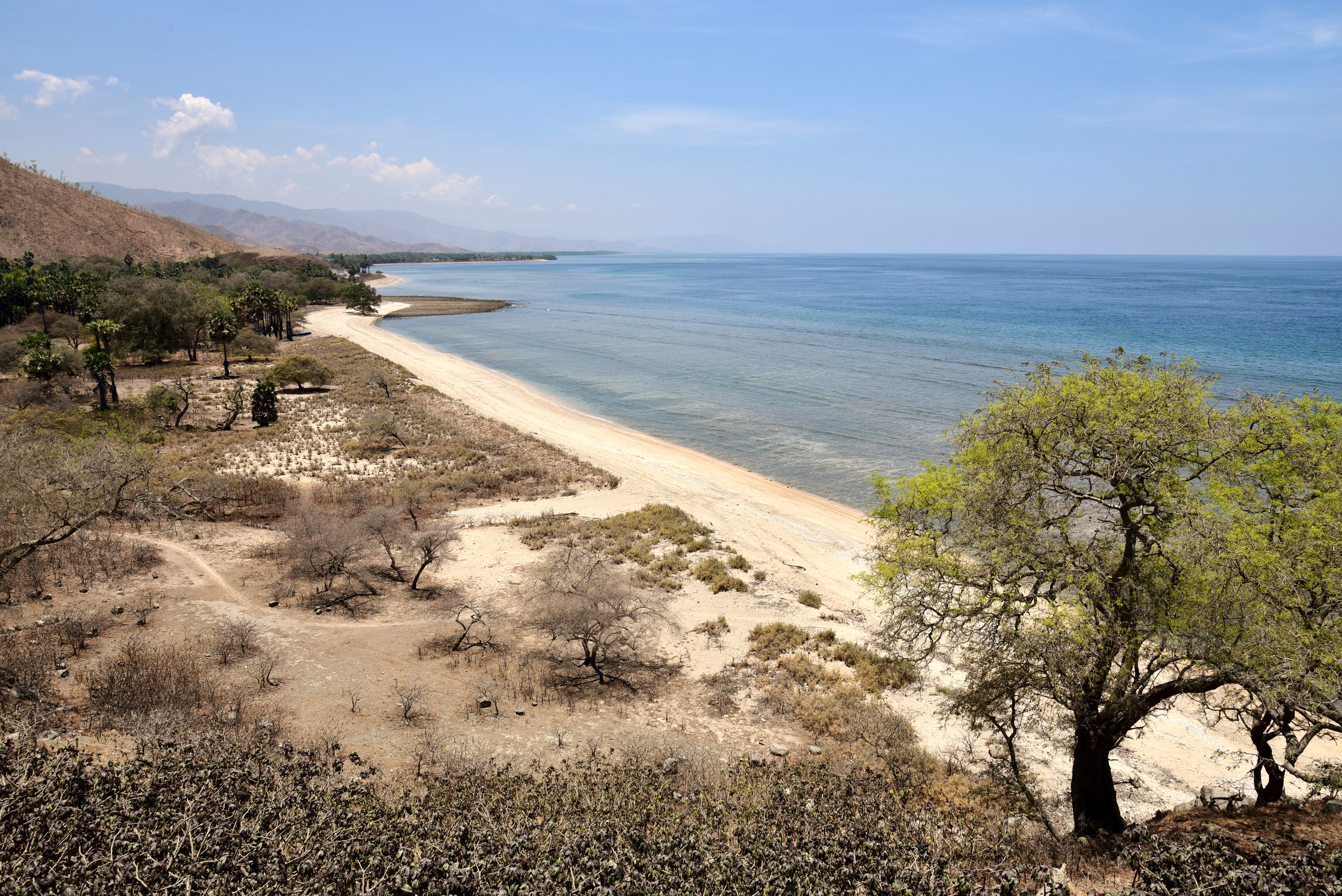
- Wetar Strait from Black Rock Beach, Timor-Leste, in 2018

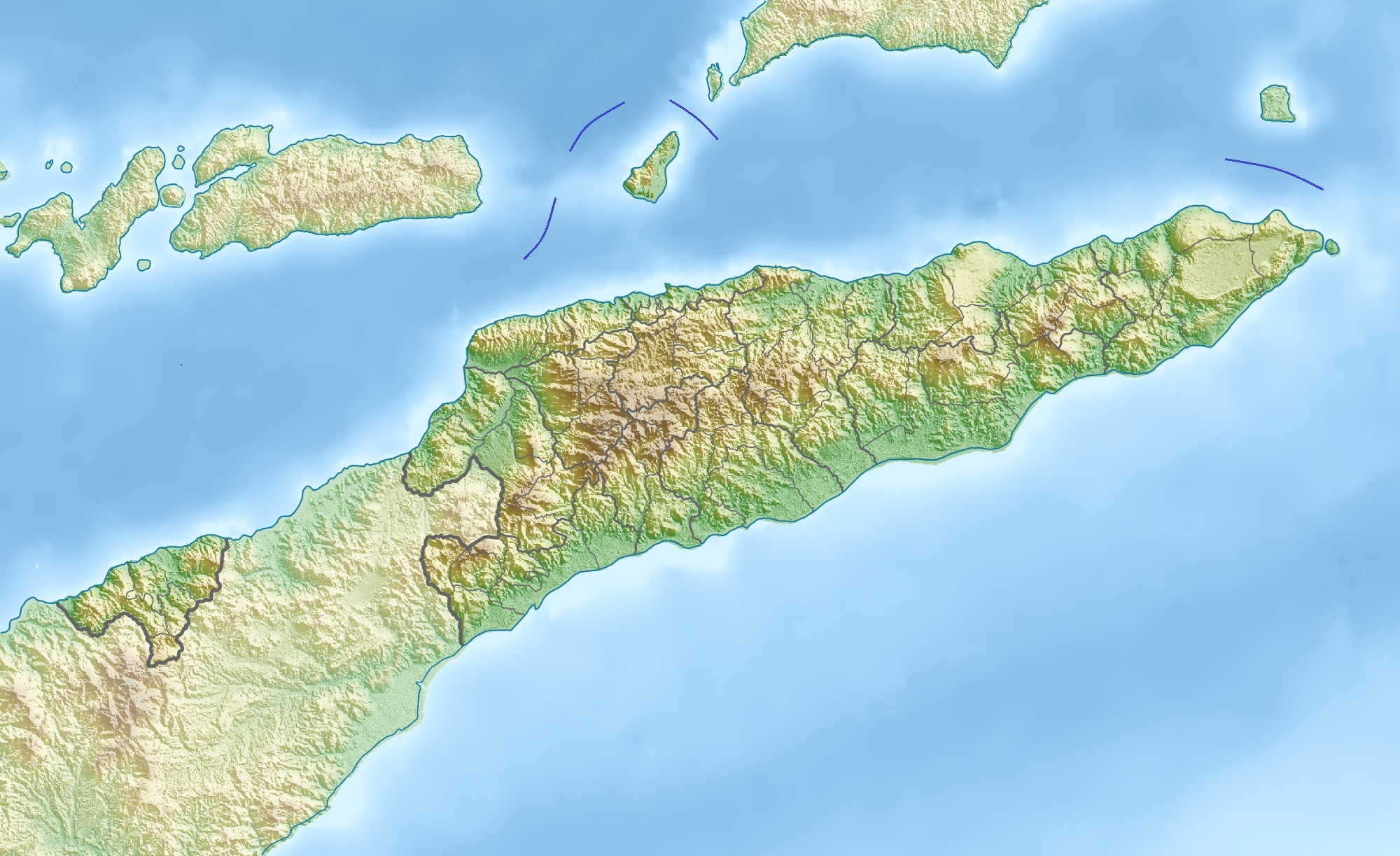
- Location within East Timor

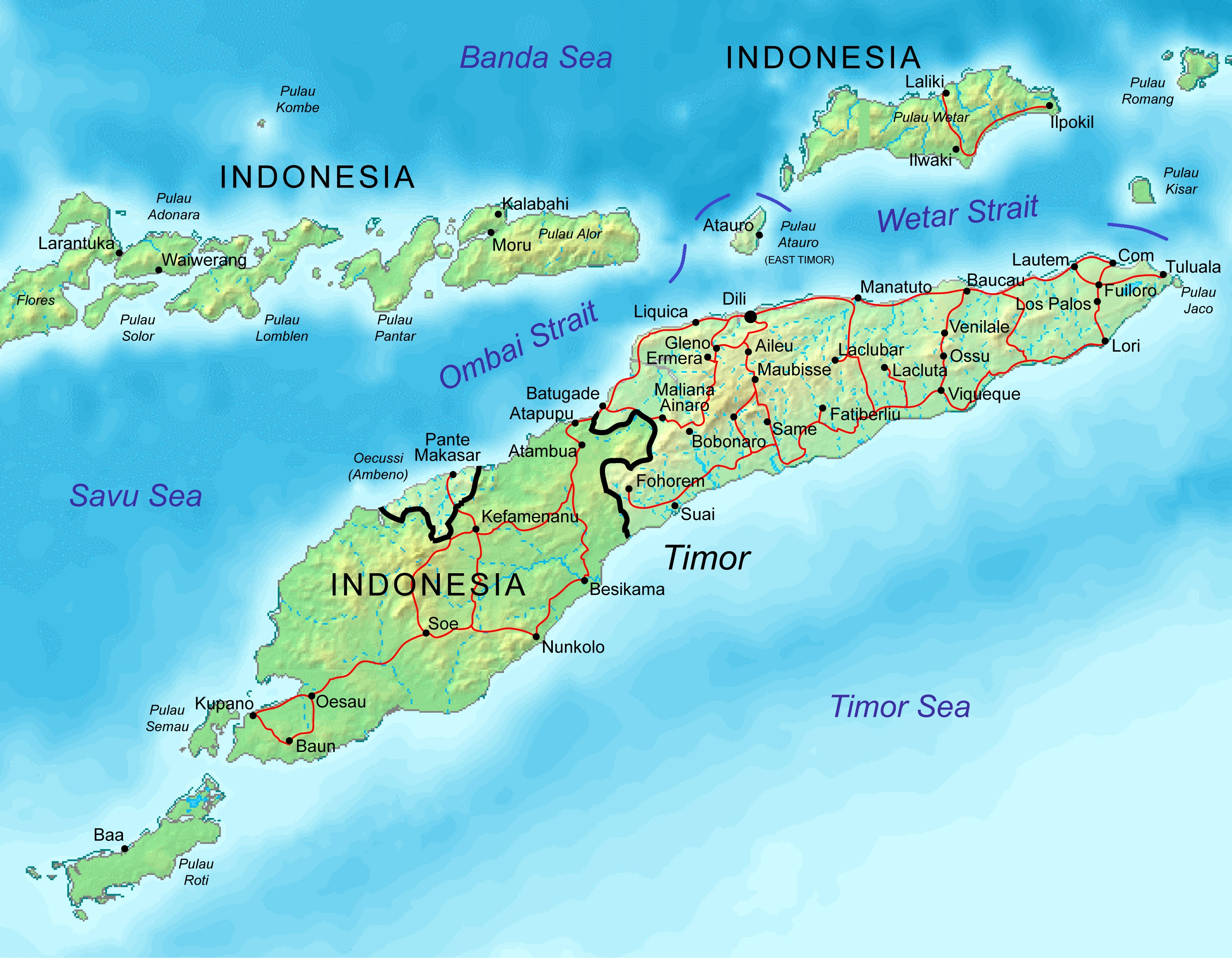
- Location: Southeast Asia
- Coordinates: 8°20′00″S 126°30′00″E
- Type: Strait
- Etymology: Wetar Island
- Part of: Banda Sea
- Basin countries: Indonesia; Timor-Leste
- Min. width: 42.6 km (26.5 mi)
- References: Wetar Strait: Indonesia National Geospatial-Intelligence Agency, Bethesda, MD, USA

Wetar Strait (Indonesian: Selat Wetar, Portuguese: Estreito de Wetar, Tetum: Estreitu Wetar) is an international strait in Southeast Asia. It separates the island of Wetar from the eastern part of the island of Timor. The strait is also the eastern portion of a pair of international straits, the other one being Ombai Strait; the two straits combine to link the Indian Ocean with the Pacific Ocean.

== Etymology ==
Wetar is the name of the Indonesian island on the other side of the strait's northern coastline.

In Tetum, the expression tasi feto (lit. transl. 'female sea') is often used to refer to the 'Ombai-Wetar Strait', which extends along most of Timor's northern shores. The counterpart of that body of water, the Timor Sea, which has larger waves, is more turbid, and washes the whole of Timor's southern coastline, is commonly referred to in Tetum as tasi mane (lit. transl. 'male sea').

== Geography ==
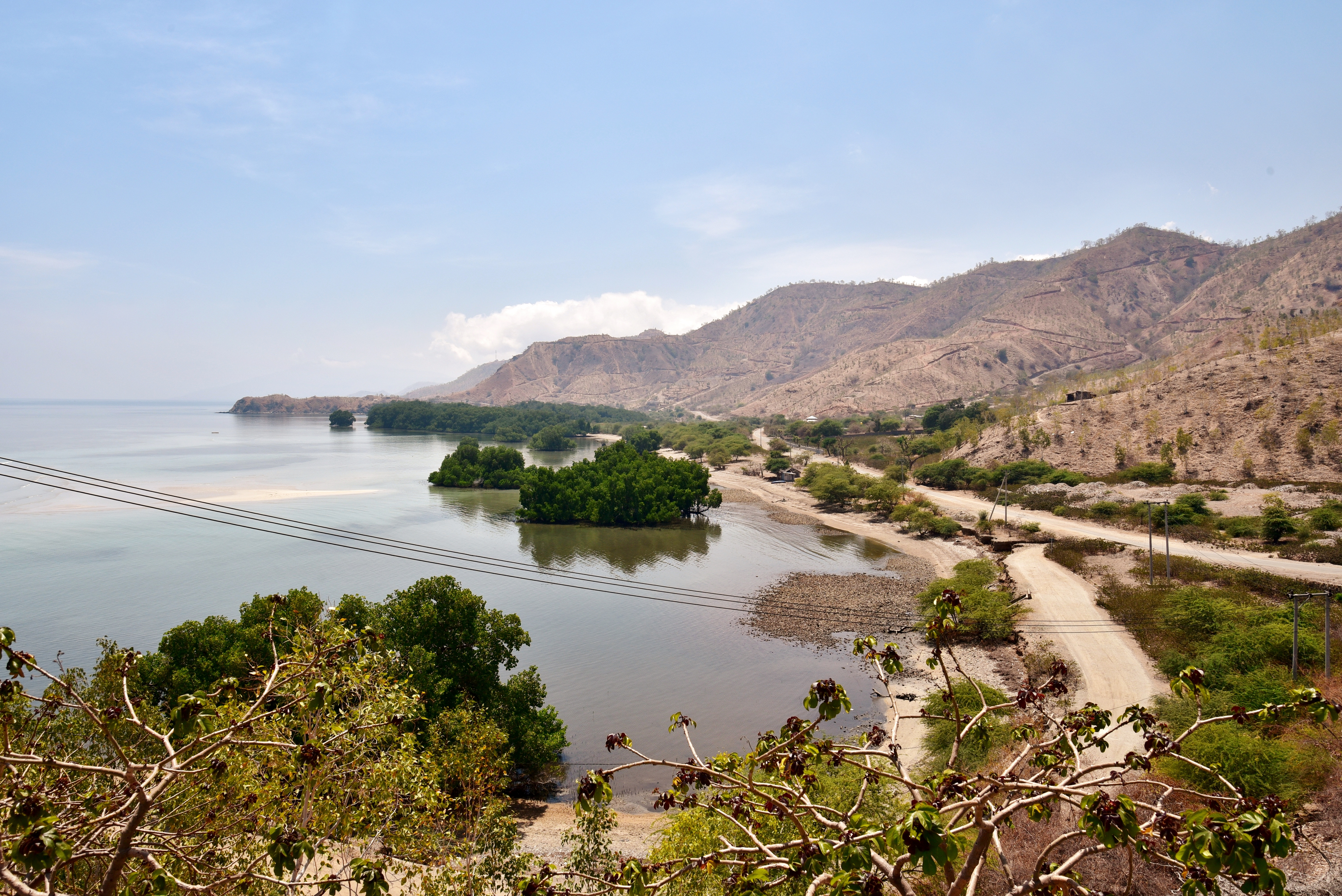
Point Fatomano, Timor-Leste, in 2018

The strait separates the island of Wetar from the eastern part of the island of Timor. It thus lies between the nations of Indonesia to the north and Timor-Leste to the south. At its narrowest point, it is 42.6 km (26.5 mi) across.

To the north west of the strait is the island of Atauro. To the west of the strait, and linking with it, is Ombai Strait.

To the east of the two straits are the south eastern reaches of the Banda Sea, and the southernmost of the Maluku Islands.

Wetar Strait is enclosed by the Banda Sea, the southern limit of which runs from the eastern extremity of Timor along its north coast as far as longitude 125° East. From that point, the sea's western limit heads north to Alor, where it starts a further run, along Alor's south coast, around its east point, and beyond.

As such, the strait is one of two deep water passages in the Indonesian archipelago that link the waters of the Pacific and Indian Oceans, the other one being Ombai Strait. The archipelago is the only interocean connection on earth at low latitudes, and the exchange of water between the two oceans is known as the Indonesian Throughflow (ITF).

The ITF flows in a generally north east to south west direction. Its main pathway runs from the Pacific Ocean into the Banda Sea via the Celebes Sea, Makassar Strait and the Java and Flores Seas. Some of the ITF then passes directly into Ombai Strait, and some of it flows there indirectly, around Wetar Island's eastern end, and then via Wetar Strait.

By this and other ITF pathways, nutrient-rich water from the Pacific Ocean runs into the Indian Ocean, at a rate 50 times faster than the discharge of the Amazon River. During El Niño, the water is cooler and inhibits rain.

== Ecology ==
=== Flora ===
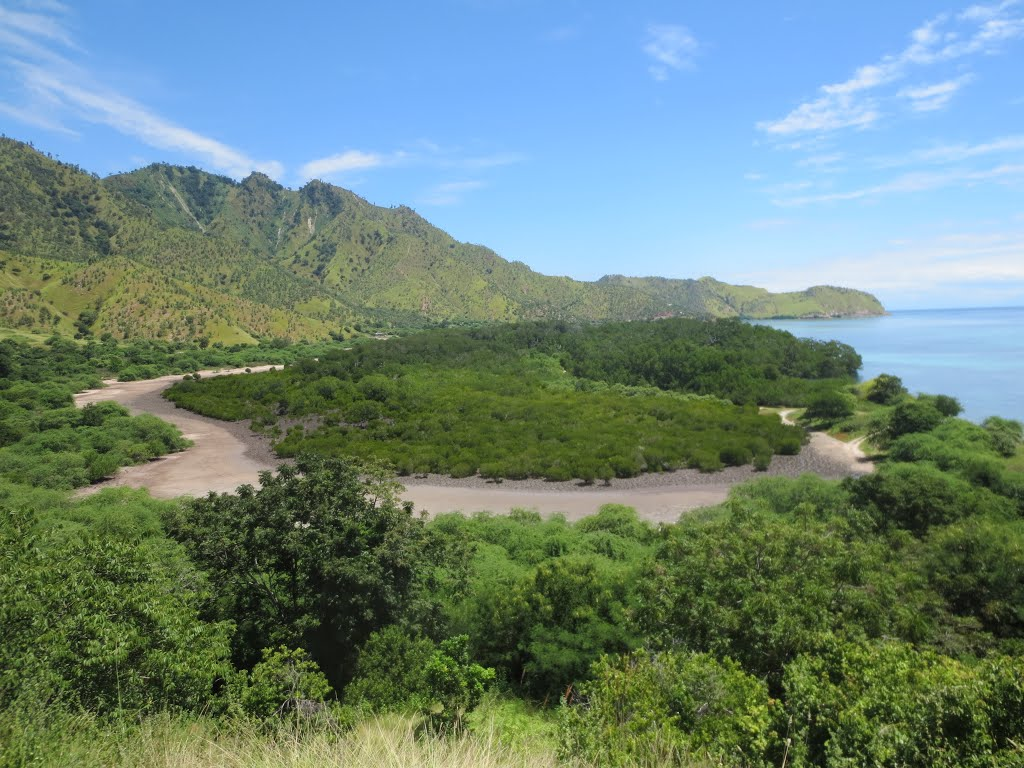
A mangrove patch east of One Dollar Beach, Timor-Leste, in 2013

The shallow coastal waters along the northern littoral of Timor-Leste are dominated by a seagrass bed about 2,200 ha (5,400 acres) in total area. Seagrass beds protect coral reefs from sedimentation and are feeding grounds for dugong (Dugong dugon), an endangered species. Seven genera of seagrass are known to exist off Timor-Leste's coastline as a whole.

Timor-Leste's coastal waters have also traditionally hosted mangrove forests. Together with seagrasses and coral reefs, they are the primary breeding grounds for many species of fish and shellfish. However, the country's mangrove cover has very substantially declined since 1940, and in the Wetar Strait is now confined to the coastline and hinterland between Cape Fatucama and Manatuto.

At the strait's mangrove communities in Hera and Metinaro, Timor-Leste, the latter of which is considered to be the largest mangrove area in the country, the dominant species are Sonneratia alba, Rhizophora apiculata, Ceriops tagal, and Avicennia. Uniquely, the landward zone of both areas is dominated by stunted dense Ceriops tagal or Avicennia, or a mix of the two. In general, the mangroves in both areas are heavily disturbed by human activities, including road and building construction, fish and shrimp ponds, uncontrolled cattle grazing, mangrove cutting, heavy sedimentation, and sea level rise. Both areas are therefore now far smaller than they used to be.

=== Fauna ===
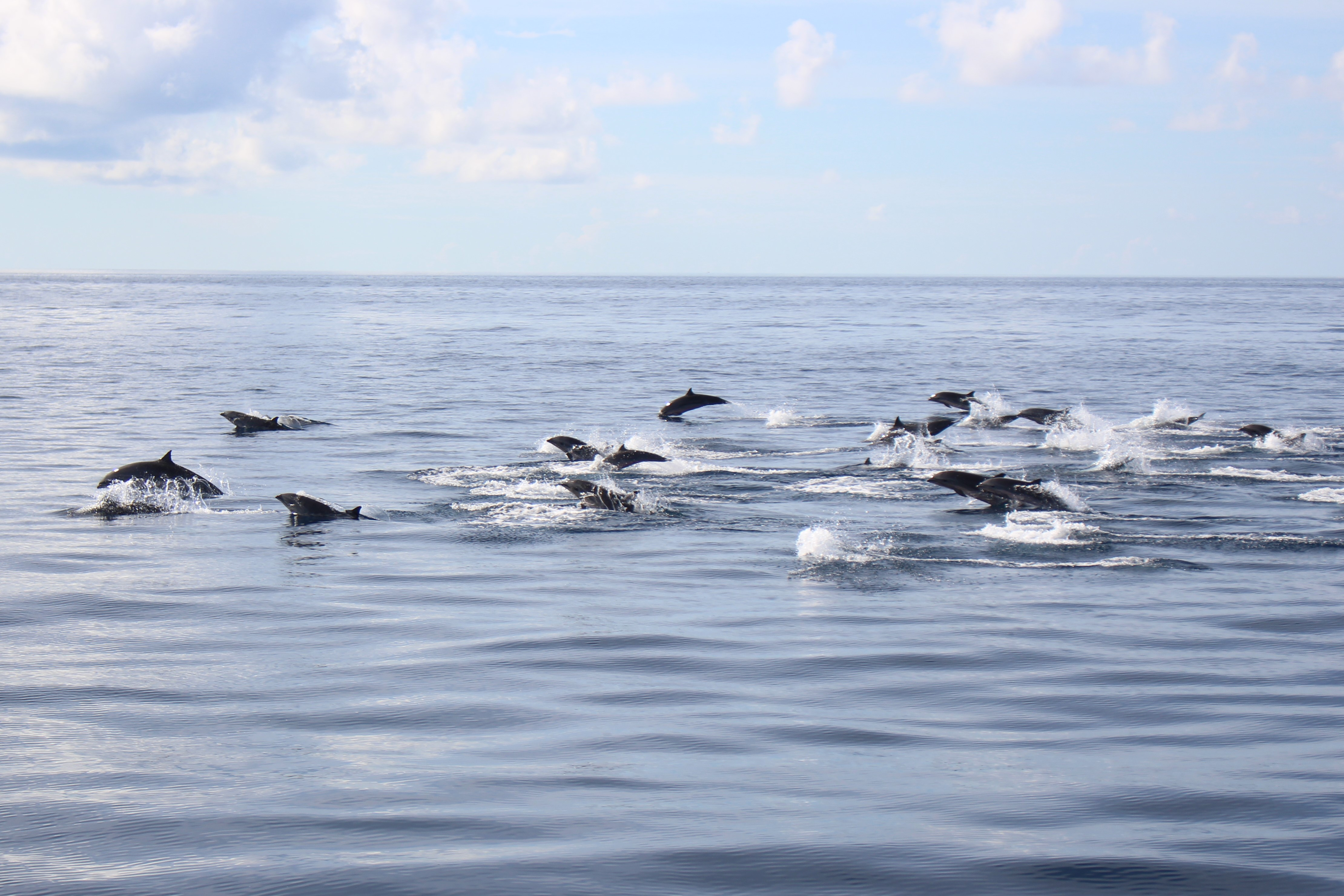
Dolphins in the Banda Sea in 2017

Both Wetar Strait and Ombai Strait are heavily used by whales, dolphins, whale sharks and manta rays; the two straits combine to form a major migratory route for such marine life between the Indian Ocean and Pacific Ocean. Timor-Leste, on the south side of the two straits, is a recognized ‘global hotspot’ for whales and dolphins, and Wetar Strait has been described by marine scientists as an ‘ocean superhighway’ for them. Amongst the species of whales and dolphins that migrate via the strait are blue whales, beaked whales, short-finned pilot whales, melon-headed whales, spotted dolphins, rough-toothed dolphins and bottlenose dolphins.

Wetar Strait is also part of the Coral Triangle, which is recognised as a global centre of marine biodiversity; the coastal zones of Timor-Leste have important areas of coral reef ecosystems.

The far north western end of the strait includes an Important Bird Area (IBA), Atauro Island. The southern edge includes three IBAs. From west to east, they are Areia Branca no Dolok Oan (at the far western tip of the strait), Subaun (between Metinaro and Manatuto), and Mount Paitchau and Lake Iralalaro (at the far eastern tip of the strait). The last of these IBAs covers almost the same territory as the Nino Konis Santana National Park, the first national park to be created in Timor-Leste.

=== Ombai-Wetar Strait Hope Spot ===
On World Oceans Day 2020, the Ombai-Wetar Strait was designated as a Mission Blue Hope Spot. The designation recognises the importance of conserving the open waters on the north side of Timor-Leste, with their globally-significant coral reefs and marine biodiversity. It also emphasises the potential of the two straits for sustainable marine ecotourism development.

== Navigation ==
=== Commercial ===
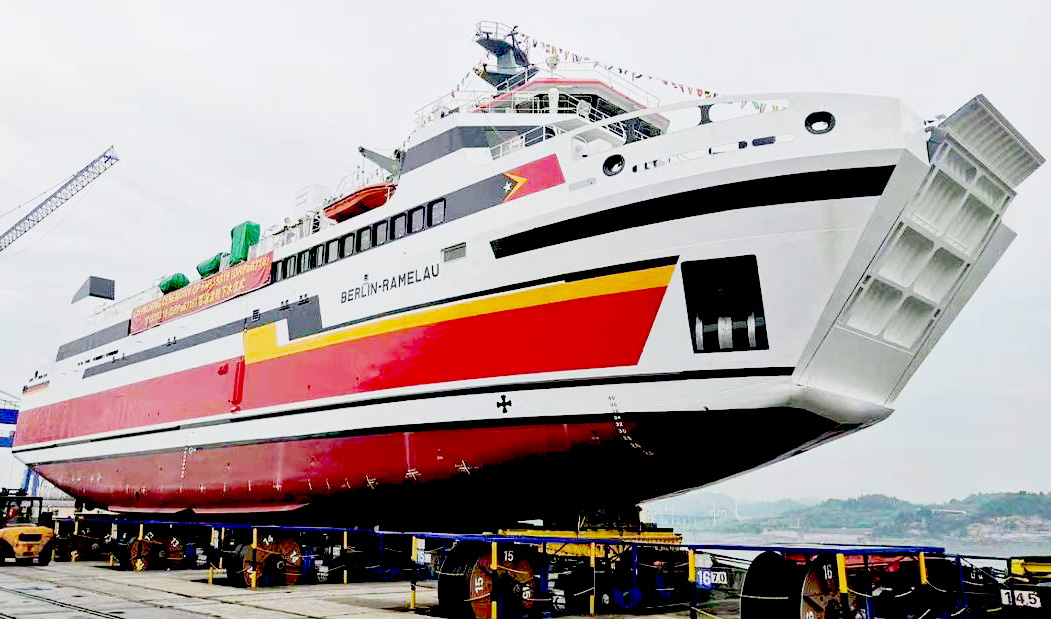
The Berlin-Ramelau prior to her launch in 2021

Under the United Nations Convention on the Law of the Sea, a commercial vessel or aircraft has freedom of navigation or overflight solely for the purpose of continuous and expeditious transit of a strait between one part of the high seas or exclusive economic zone and another. That transit passage principle applies to the Ombai Strait and Wetar Strait, as they combine to link the Indian Ocean with the Pacific Ocean.

The Ombai-Wetar route is longer in distance than its Strait of Malacca-Singapore Strait counterpart. The former route is therefore not really a preferred alternative path for west to east commercial traffic. However, it is sometimes used, and is considered the safest route, for the largest oil tankers transiting between the Persian Gulf and Japan, and is also used by vessels transiting between Australia and the Java Sea or East Asia.

The two straits are always critical for Timor-Leste, both in relation to its own international trade and as routes for internal transport. The Berlin-Ramelau operates internal East Timorese ferry services linking Dili with Manatuto, Baucau, Lautém and Viqueque via the Wetar Strait.

If there were any disruption in the flow of commercial shipping on the Malacca-Singapore route, the Ombai-Wetar route would also have a crucial role to play in global trade, especially for the Asia-Pacific region.

=== Military ===
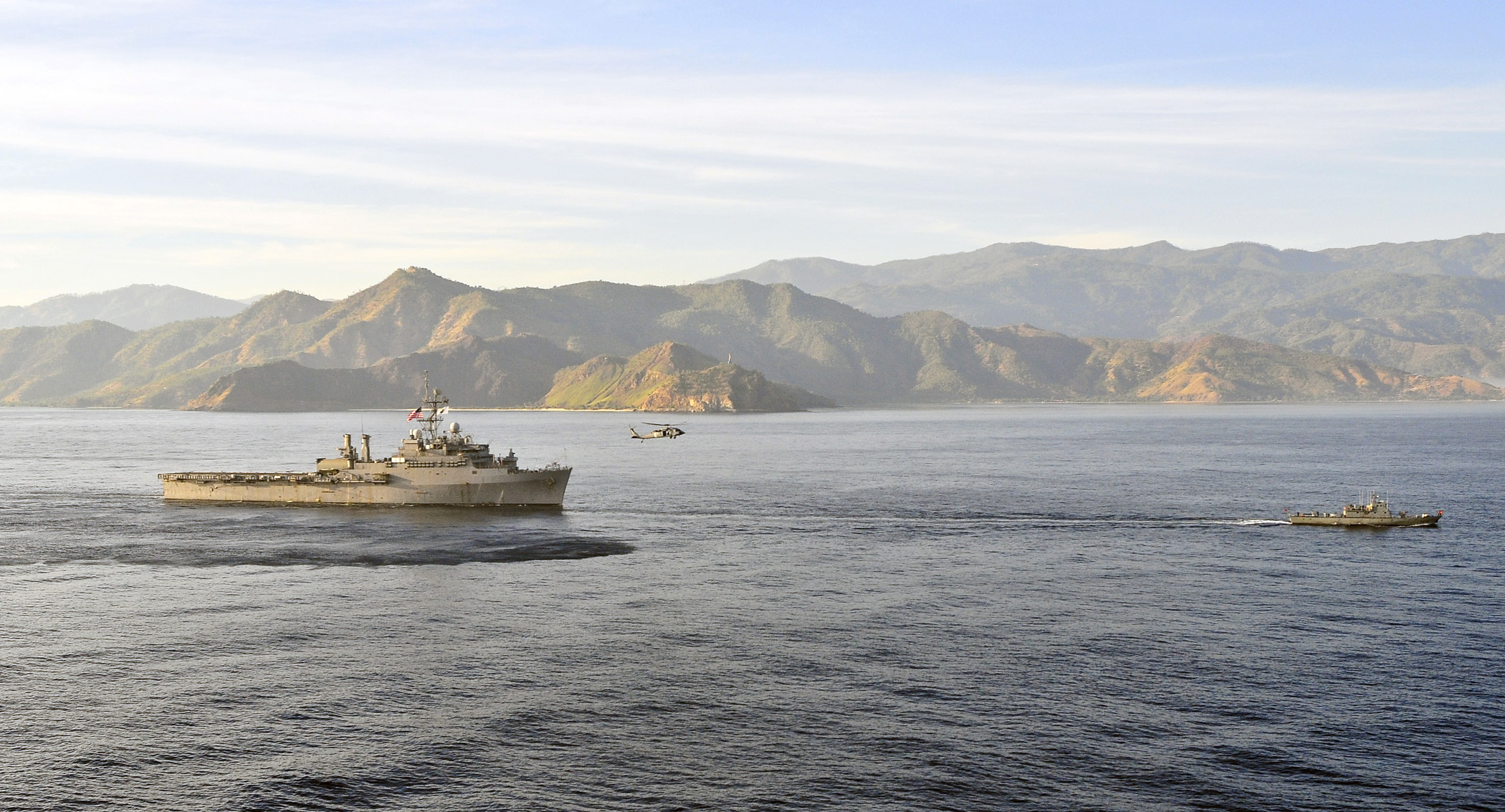
USS Cleveland near the transition between the two straits in 2011, with Cape Fatucama behind her

The ships and aircraft of all nations, including warships, auxiliaries, and military aircraft, enjoy the right of unimpeded transit passage through straits such as the Ombai-Wetar route and their approaches. Submarines are free to transit the route submerged, as that is their normal mode of operation.

The channels of the Ombai-Wetar route are extremely deep. Timor-Leste has refused advances by China seeking off-shore oil rights and permission to set up radar arrays ostensibly to counter illegal fishing. The two straits therefore provide a route for undetected access by nuclear-powered submarines between the two oceans they connect.

By the mid-1970s, the Ombai-Wetar route had been identified as one of five international straits essential for passage by U.S. ballistic missile submarines, the others being Gibraltar, Malacca-Singapore, Lombok and Sunda. In 1977, a paper published by the International Institute for Strategic Studies, based in London, ranked the Ombai-Wetar route as the second-most-important strait in the world to U.S. defense interests, after the Strait of Gibraltar. The two straits are now also considered by China to be strategically significant.

== Economy ==
=== Fishing ===
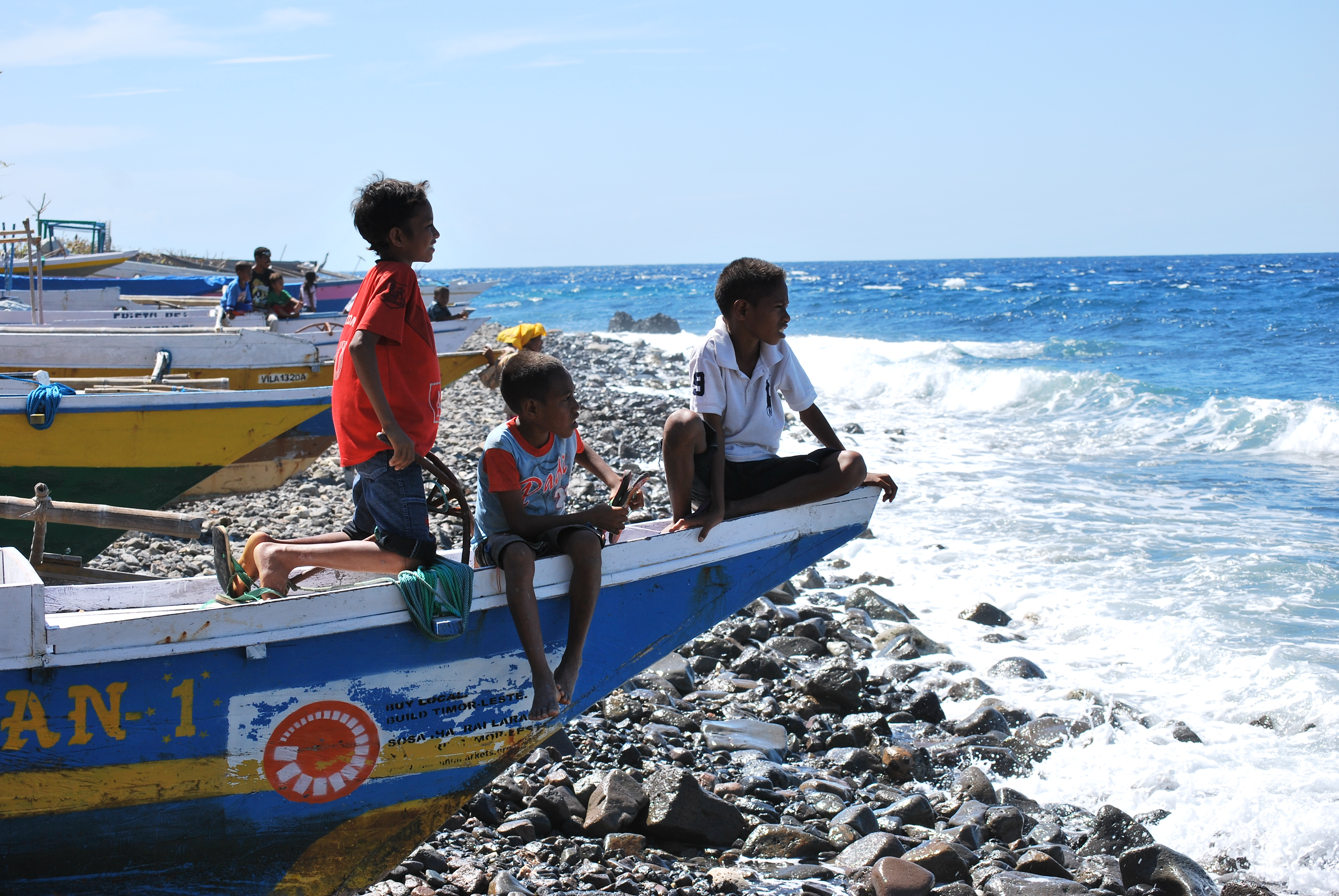
Children sitting on fishing boats in Suco Maquili, Atauro, in 2010

In Timor-Leste, involvement in fishing is low by comparison with other small island countries. Along the country's portion of the north coast of Timor island, and around Atauro, including within the strait, fishing levels are higher than elsewhere in the country, other than in pockets along parts of its south coast. Many of the fishers fish part time or seasonally, and are otherwise occupied in additional activities such as carpentry, labouring or security work. Most of the fish landings are of small pelagic species, including short-bodied mackerel, sardines (Clupeidae), halfbeaks and scads (Carangidae).

=== Tourism ===
Timor-Leste's whale-watching industry is focused on the Ombai-Wetar route, and has been growing rapidly since the 2010s. Annual migrations of whales and dolphins along the route provide some of the best and most accessible whale watching in the world.

Dolphins, and even more so the smaller whale species, such as short-finned pilot and melon-headed whales, can be spotted in Wetar Strait all year round. Between October and December, the strait becomes a major migratory route: many species, both large and small, can be observed, including blue, beaked, humpback, sperm, killer, short-finned pilot and melon-headed whales, together with very large dolphin pods.

Cetaceans migrating along the route are often very close to the north shore of Timor-Leste. The coastal mountains around Subaun, on the strait between Dili and Manatuto, include cliffs and hillsides with excellent panoramic views. Networks of local residents record cetacean movements and behaviour, and then report it in 'real time' to researchers and Dili-based whale watching tour operators.
