= Mount Curi =

Mountain in East Timor

Curi
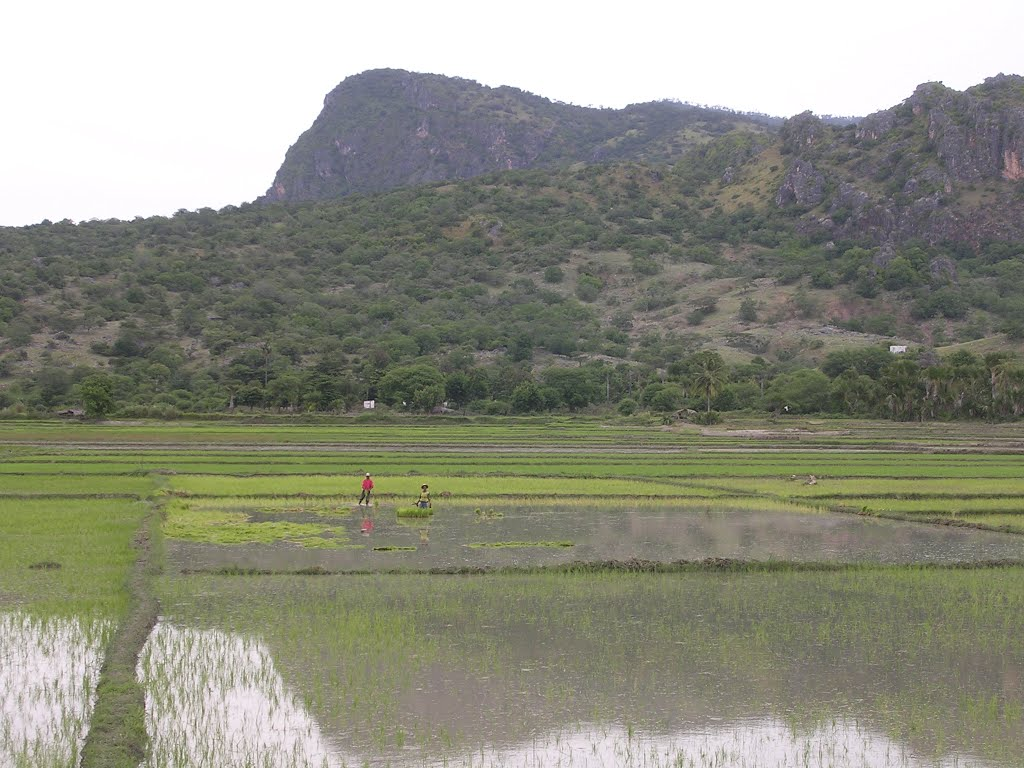

Highest point
- Elevation: 1,332 m (4,370 ft)
- Coordinates: 8°30′20″S 125°54′26″E

Geography
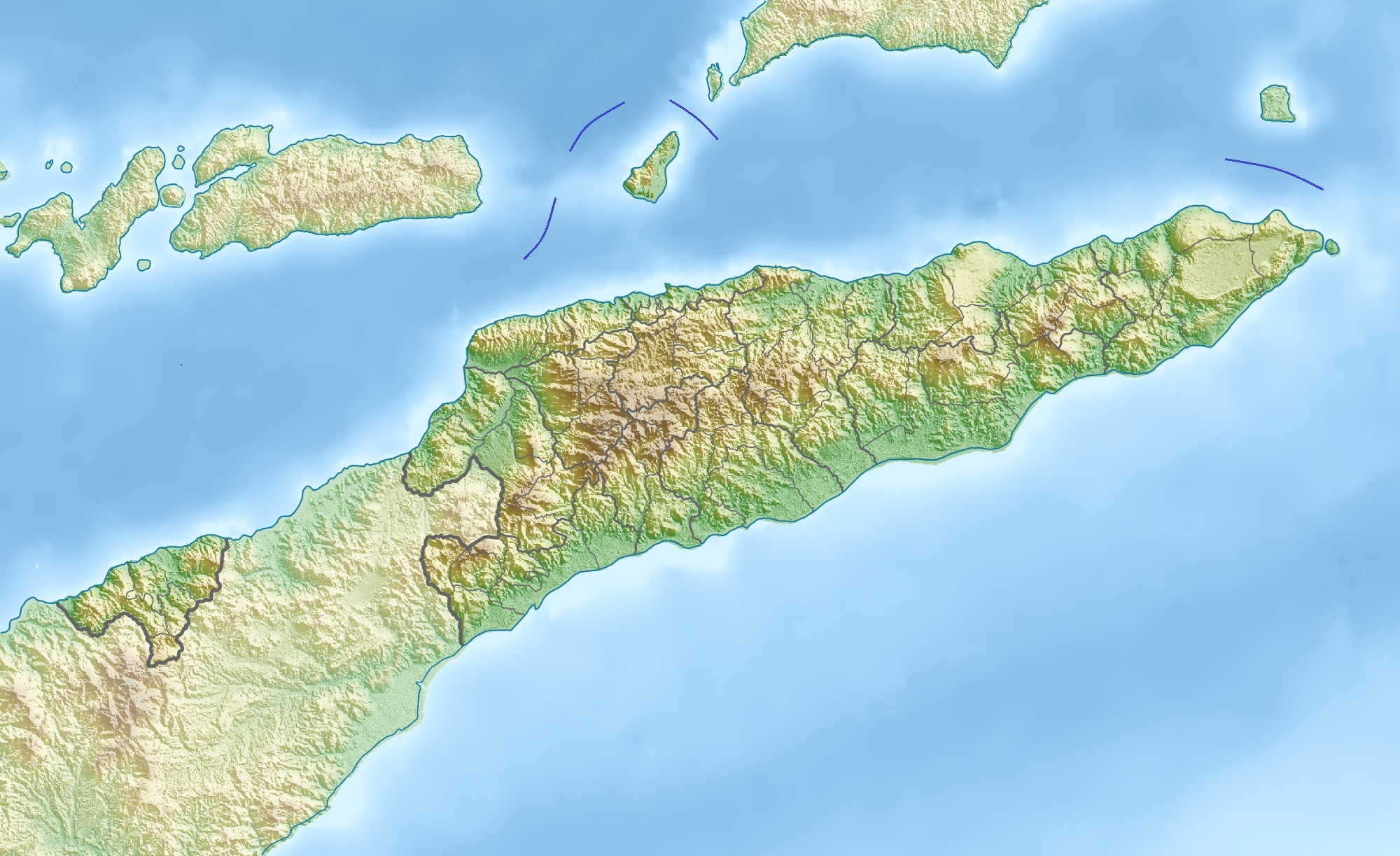
- Location within East Timor
- Location: Manatuto District, East Timor

Mount Curi is a mountain in Manatuto District, East Timor. It is part of the Mount Curi Important Bird Area and has an elevation of 1,332 metres (4,370 ft).
