= List of Important Bird Areas in Timor-Leste =

The country of Timor-Leste is home to 16 Important Bird Areas, as designated by BirdLife International.

== IBAs ==
- Areia Branca no Dolok Oan
- Atauro Island
- Be Malae
- Fatumasin
- Irabere - Iliomar
- Jaco Island
- Loré
- Maubara
- Mount Diatuto
- Monte Mak Fahik - Sarim
- Monte Tatamailau
- Mount Paitchau and Lake Iralalaro
- Subaun
- Sungai Klere
- Tasitolu
- Tilomar
