= Buff-banded thicketbird =

Conservation status
- Least Concern (IUCN 3.1)

Scientific classification
- Kingdom: Animalia
- Phylum: Chordata
- Class: Aves
- Order: Passeriformes
- Family: Locustellidae
- Genus: Cincloramphus
- Species: C. bivittatus

Binomial name
- Cincloramphus bivittatus (Bonaparte, 1850)

Synonyms
- Buettikoferella bivittata

Species of bird

The buff-banded thicketbird (Cincloramphus bivittatus) or buff-banded bushbird, is a species of Old World warbler in the family Locustellidae. It is found on Timor island.
