= Timor heleia =

Conservation status
- Least Concern (IUCN 3.1)

Scientific classification
- Kingdom: Animalia
- Phylum: Chordata
- Class: Aves
- Order: Passeriformes
- Family: Zosteropidae
- Genus: Heleia
- Species: H. muelleri

Binomial name
- Heleia muelleri Hartlaub, 1865

Species of bird

The Timor heleia (Heleia muelleri), also known as the spot-breasted white-eye or spot-breasted heleia, is a species of bird in the white-eye family Zosteropidae. It is found on Timor island. Its natural habitats are subtropical or tropical moist lowland forest and subtropical or tropical moist montane forest. It is threatened by habitat loss.
