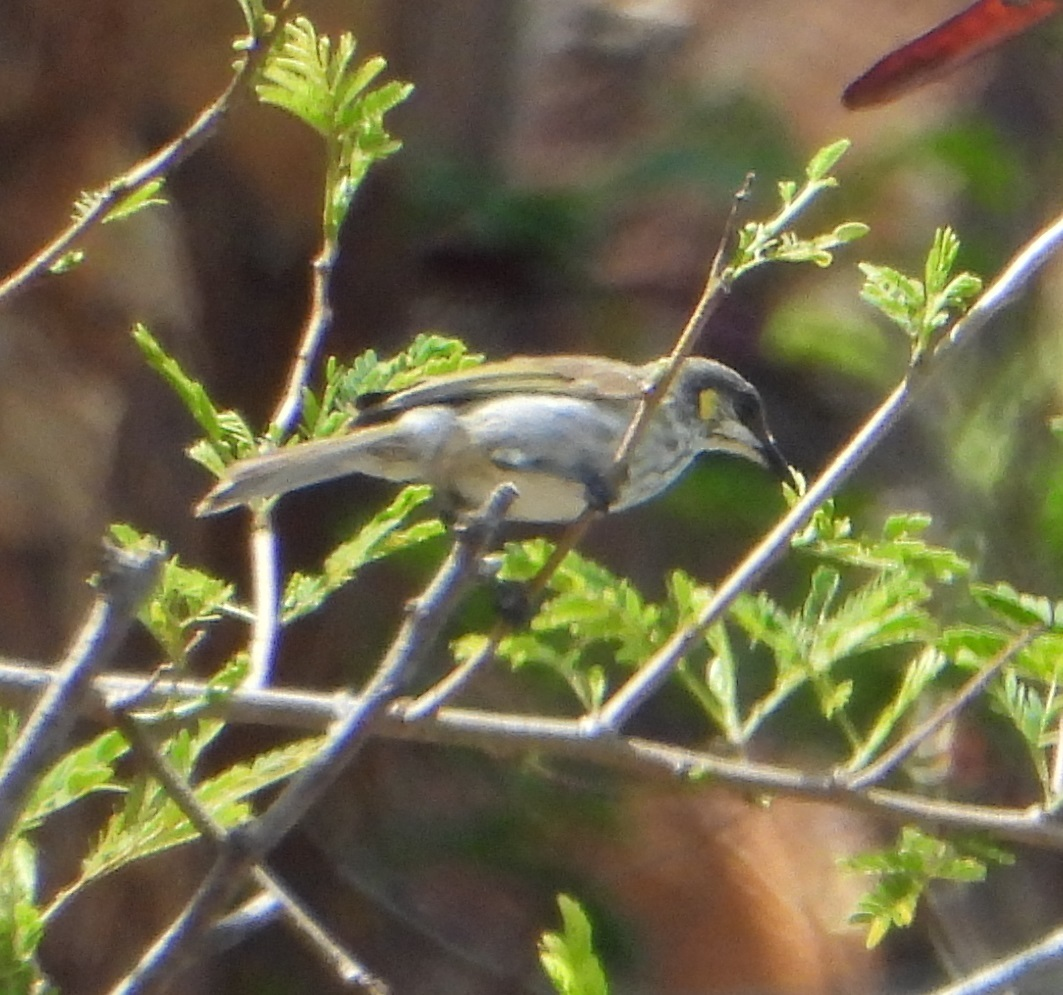

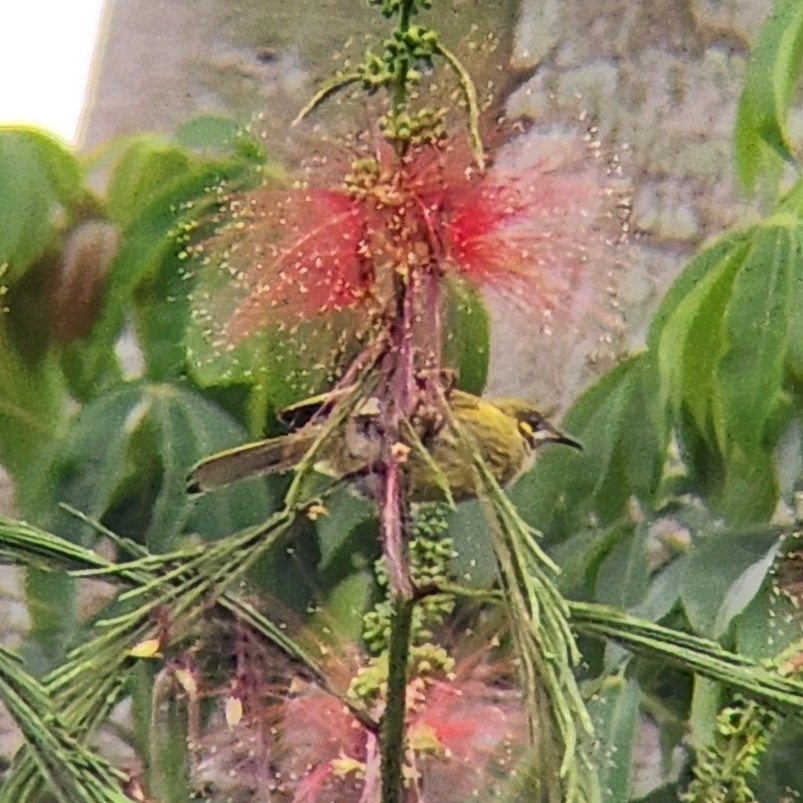

Conservation status
- Least Concern (IUCN 3.1)

Scientific classification
- Kingdom: Animalia
- Phylum: Chordata
- Class: Aves
- Order: Passeriformes
- Family: Meliphagidae
- Genus: Meliphaga
- Species: M. reticulata

Binomial name
- Meliphaga reticulata Temminck, 1820

Synonyms
- Microptilotis reticulatus (Temminck, 1824); Meliphaga reticulata Temminck, 1824

= Streak-breasted honeyeater =

Species of bird

The streak-breasted honeyeater or streaky-breasted honeyeater (Meliphaga reticulata) is a species of bird in the family Meliphagidae. It is found on Timor island. Its natural habitats are subtropical or tropical moist lowland forest, subtropical or tropical mangrove forest, and subtropical or tropical moist montane forest.
