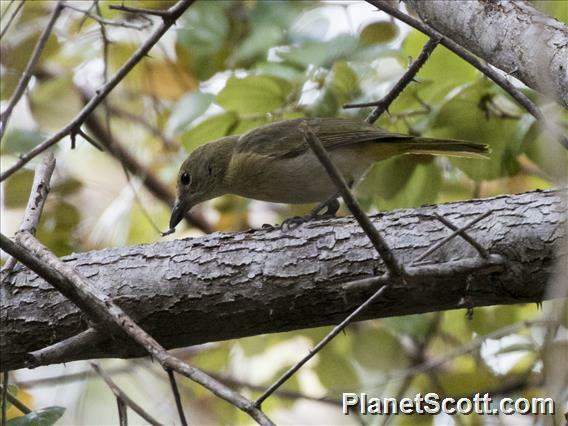

Conservation status
- Least Concern (IUCN 3.1)

Scientific classification
- Kingdom: Animalia
- Phylum: Chordata
- Class: Aves
- Order: Passeriformes
- Family: Pachycephalidae
- Genus: Pachycephala
- Species: P. orpheus

Binomial name
- Pachycephala orpheus Jardine, 1849

= Fawn-breasted whistler =

Species of bird

The fawn-breasted whistler (Pachycephala orpheus) is a species of bird in the family Pachycephalidae. It is found on the islands of Timor and Wetar. Its natural habitats are subtropical or tropical moist lowland forests and subtropical or tropical mangrove forests.

Alternate names for the fawn-breasted whistler include the Sunda whistler and Timor whistler. The former name is shared with the bare-throated whistler. The fawn-breasted whistler (Pachycephala orpheus) is primarily insectivorous, searching by collecting insects from underground and the shrub layer of its forest habitat in Timor and Wetar, Indonesia. It is native to the islands of Timor and Wetar, where it lives in mountainous areas up to a height of roughly 1200 meters as well as subtropical and tropical moist lowland forests.

Three subspecies are recognised:

- P. o. orpheus Jardine, 1849 – Rote Island, Timor, Jaco (east of Timor), Atauro (between Timor and Wetar) and Wetar (east Lesser Sunda Islands)
- P. o. par Hartert, EJO, 1904 – Romang, east of Wetar; east Lesser Sunda Islands)
- P. o. compar Hartert, EJO, 1904 – Leti and Moa (east of Timor, east Lesser Sunda Islands)

The subspecies P. o. par and P. o. compar were formerly considered as subspecies of the yellow-throated whistler (Pachycephala macrorhyncha). They were reassigned to the fawn-breasted whistler based on the results of phylogenetic analyses.
