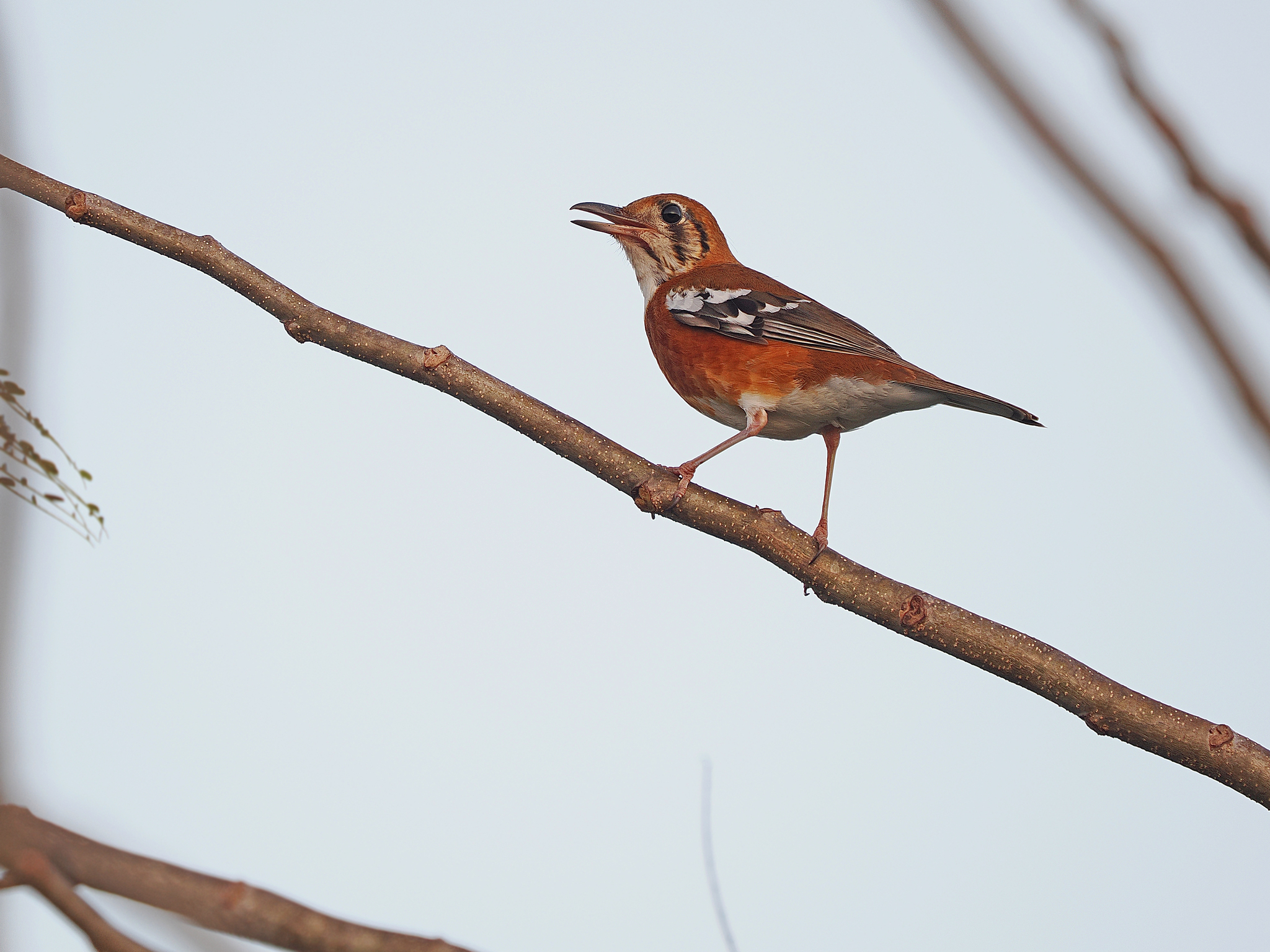

Conservation status
- Near Threatened (IUCN 3.1)

Scientific classification
- Kingdom: Animalia
- Phylum: Chordata
- Class: Aves
- Order: Passeriformes
- Family: Turdidae
- Genus: Geokichla
- Species: G. peronii

Binomial name
- Geokichla peronii (Vieillot, 1818)

Synonyms
- Zoothera peronii

= Orange-sided thrush =

Species of bird

The orange-sided thrush or orange-banded thrush (Geokichla peronii) is a species of bird in the family Turdidae. It is found on Timor island and the southern Maluku Islands. Its natural habitats are subtropical or tropical dry forests and subtropical or tropical moist lowland forests. It is threatened by habitat loss.
