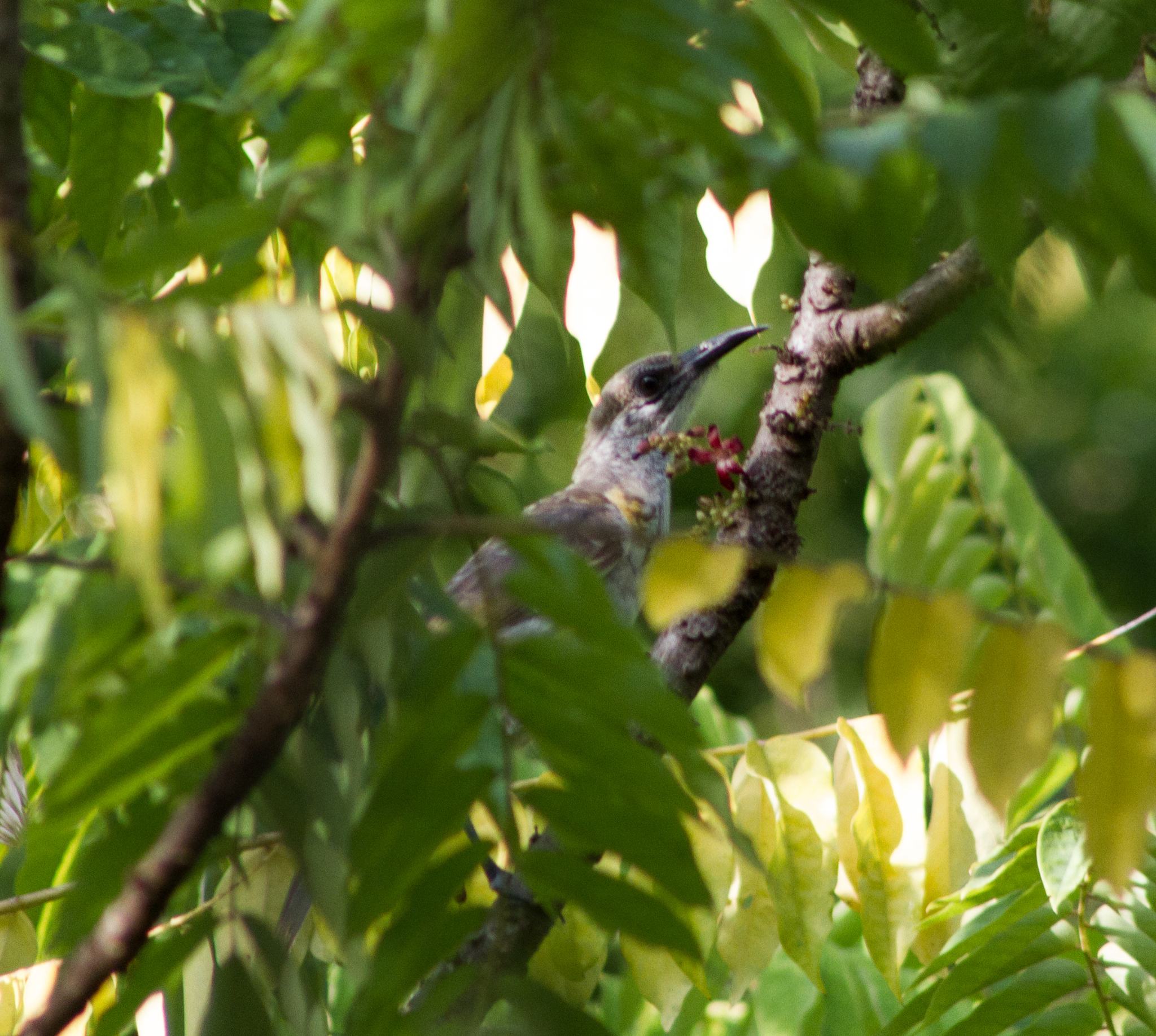

Conservation status
- Least Concern (IUCN 3.1)

Scientific classification
- Kingdom: Animalia
- Phylum: Chordata
- Class: Aves
- Order: Passeriformes
- Family: Meliphagidae
- Genus: Philemon
- Species: P. inornatus

Binomial name
- Philemon inornatus (Gray, 1846)

= Timor friarbird =

Species of bird

The Timor friarbird or plain friarbird (Philemon inornatus) is a species of bird in the family Meliphagidae. It is found on Timor island.

== Habitat ==
It is found on Timor island, where it plays an important cultural role. Its natural habitat is subtropical or tropical dry forests; it tends to be most present near roads, particularly flat low-traffic roads near rivers and mangroves. It is a species generalist.

== Threats ==
It is threatened by human-caused habitat loss—caused by logging, forest fires, and illegitimate grazing—and poaching. Over the past decade, its population has decreased significantly.

== Diet ==
It feeds primarily on nectar, and also eats insects and fruit.

== Social behavior ==
Timor friarbirds live in pairs or small groups.
