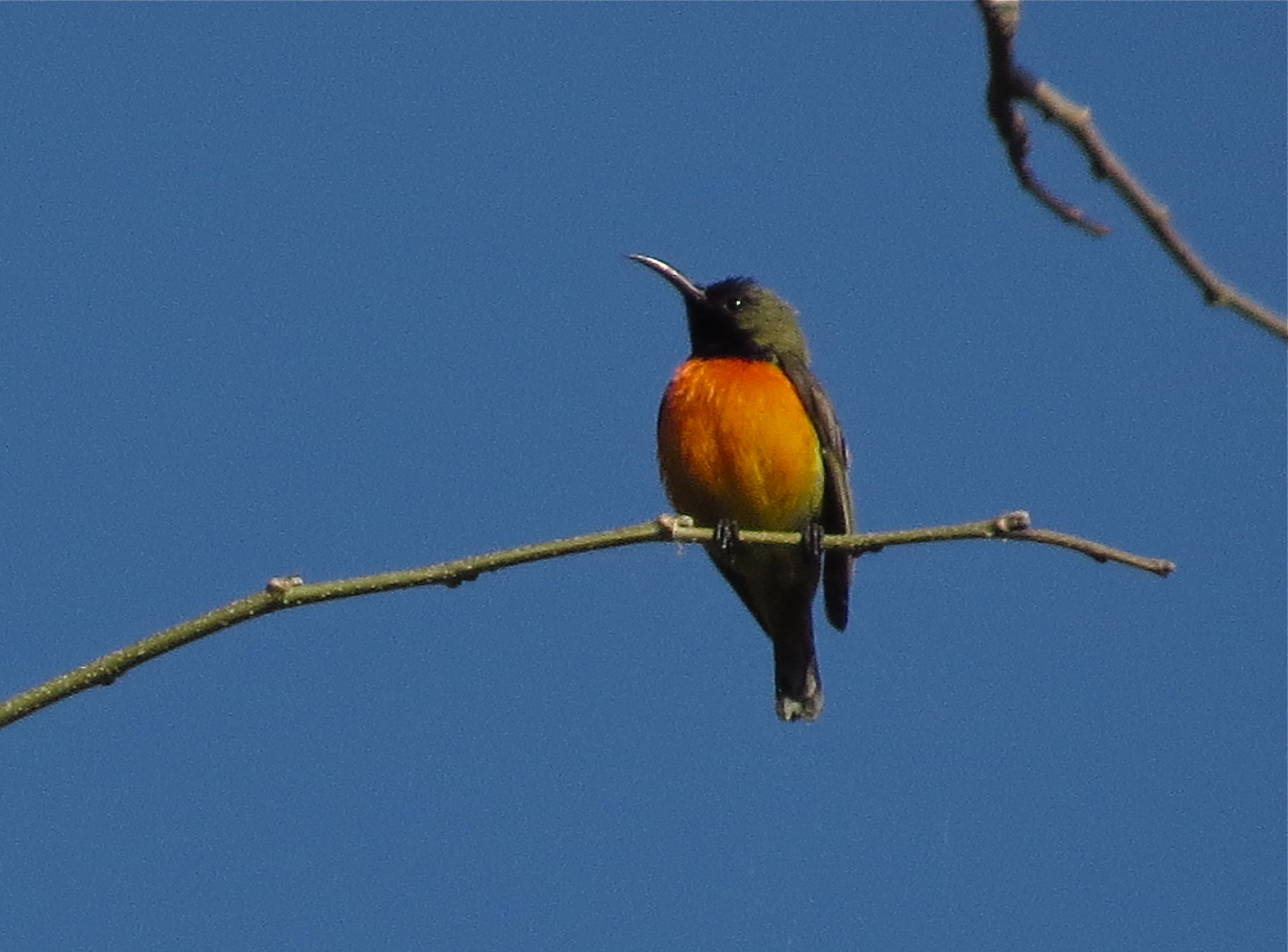
- Photo of male

Conservation status
- Least Concern (IUCN 3.1)

Scientific classification
- Kingdom: Animalia
- Phylum: Chordata
- Class: Aves
- Order: Passeriformes
- Family: Nectariniidae
- Genus: Cinnyris
- Species: C. solaris

Binomial name
- Cinnyris solaris (Temminck, 1825)

= Flame-breasted sunbird =

Species of bird

The flame-breasted sunbird (Cinnyris solaris) is a species of bird in the family Nectariniidae. It is found on Timor and other islands, primarily in the Indonesian province of Nusa Tenggara Timur. Its natural habitat is subtropical or tropical moist lowland forests.

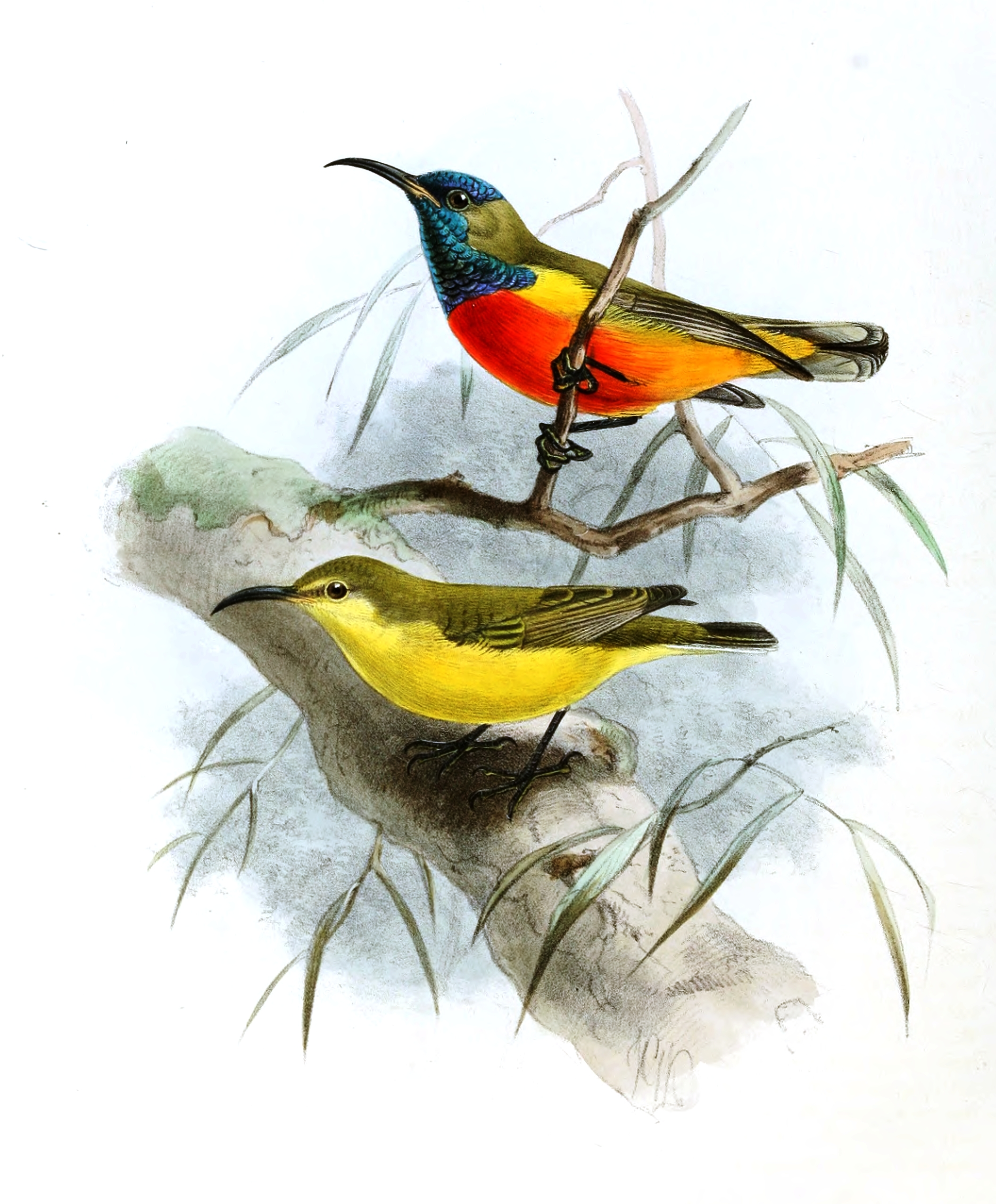
Illustration of male (top) and female
