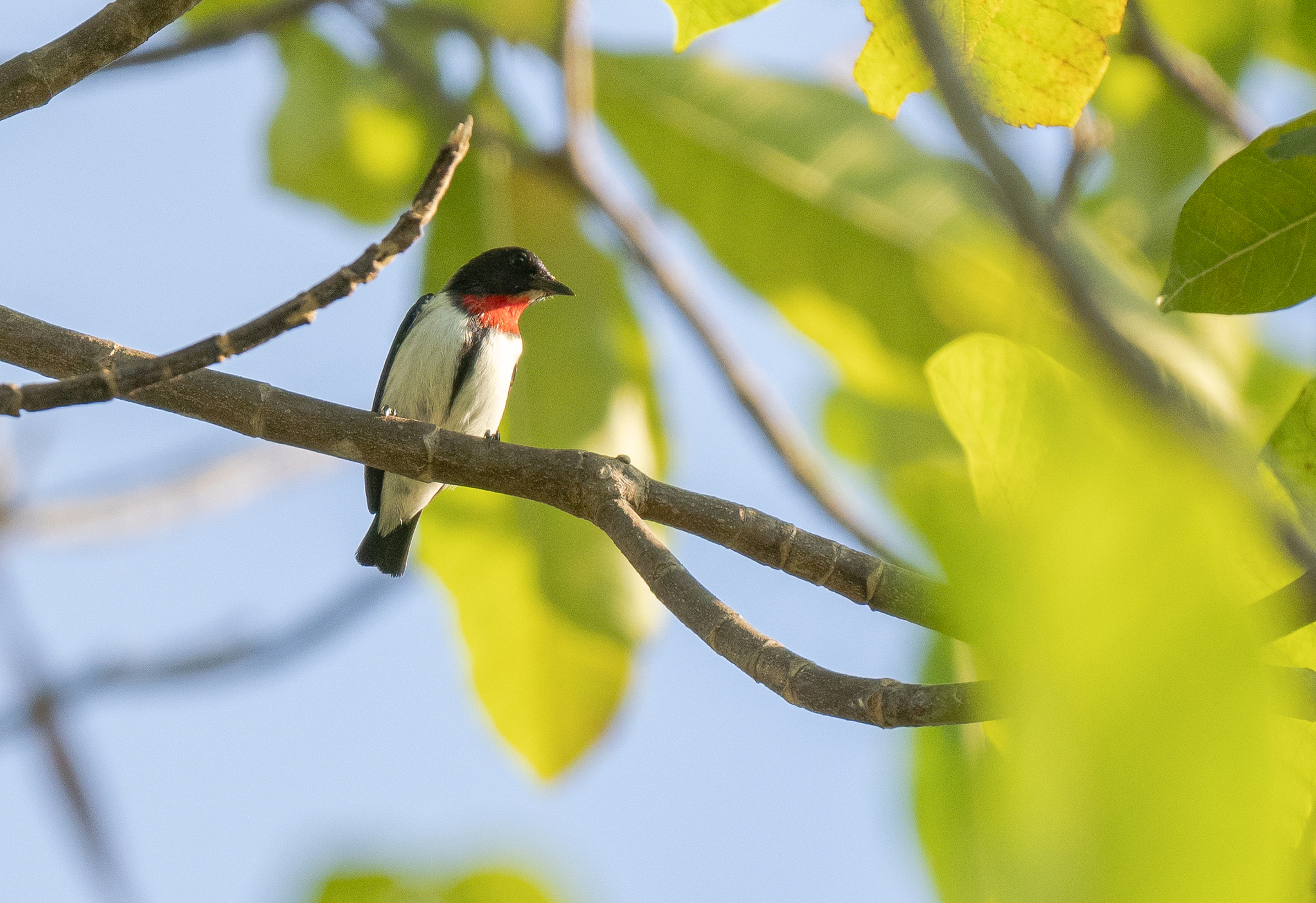

Conservation status
- Least Concern (IUCN 3.1)

Scientific classification
- Kingdom: Animalia
- Phylum: Chordata
- Class: Aves
- Order: Passeriformes
- Family: Dicaeidae
- Genus: Dicaeum
- Species: D. maugei

Binomial name
- Dicaeum maugei Lesson, RP, 1830

= Red-chested flowerpecker =

Species of bird

The red-chested flowerpecker or blue-cheeked flowerpecker (Dicaeum maugei) is a species of bird in the family Dicaeidae. It is found on the Lesser Sunda Islands (namely Timor island). Its natural habitats are subtropical or tropical moist lowland forest and subtropical or tropical moist montane forest.
