= Olive-brown oriole =

Olive-brown oriole has been split into the following species:

- Timor oriole, Oriolus melanotis
- Wetar oriole, Oriolus finschi
