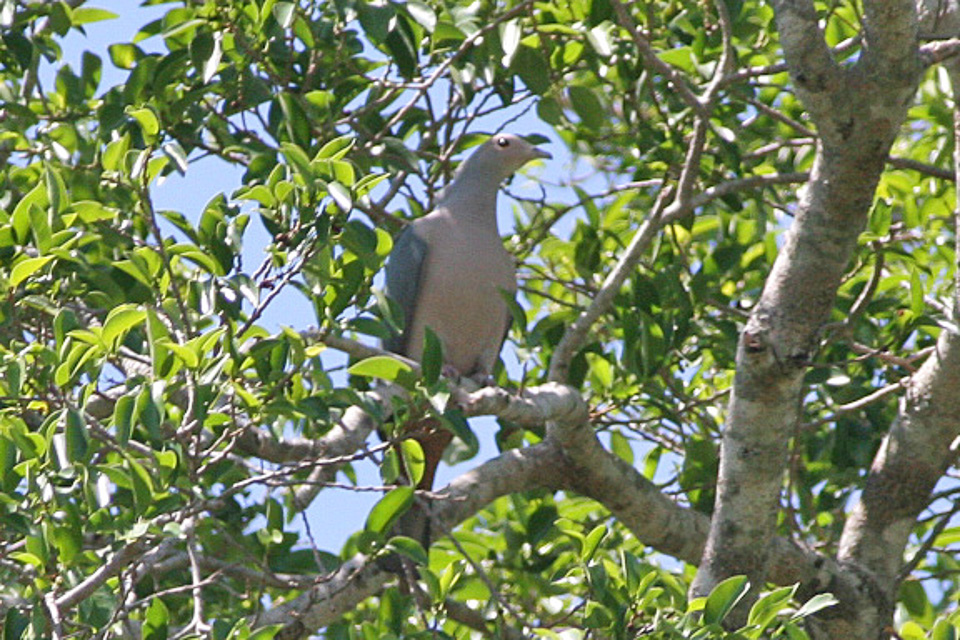

Conservation status
- Near Threatened (IUCN 3.1)

Scientific classification
- Kingdom: Animalia
- Phylum: Chordata
- Class: Aves
- Order: Columbiformes
- Family: Columbidae
- Genus: Ducula
- Species: D. rosacea

Binomial name
- Ducula rosacea (Temminck, 1836)

= Pink-headed imperial pigeon =

Species of bird

The pink-headed imperial pigeon (Ducula rosacea) is a species of bird in the family Columbidae found in the Lesser Sunda Islands of Indonesia. Its natural habitats are subtropical or tropical moist lowland forests, subtropical or tropical mangrove forests, and subtropical or tropical moist shrubland. It is threatened by habitat loss.
