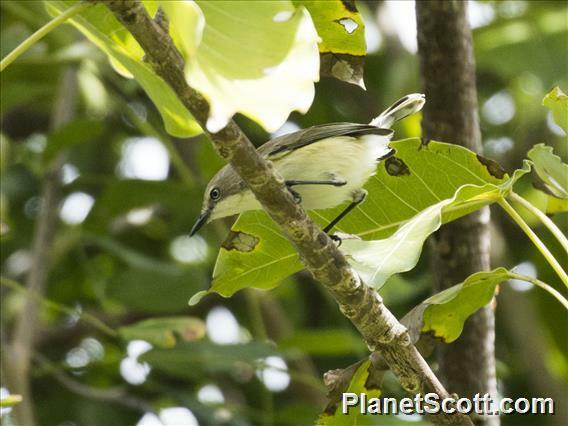

Conservation status
- Least Concern (IUCN 3.1)

Scientific classification
- Kingdom: Animalia
- Phylum: Chordata
- Class: Aves
- Order: Passeriformes
- Family: Acanthizidae
- Genus: Gerygone
- Species: G. inornata

Binomial name
- Gerygone inornata Wallace, 1864
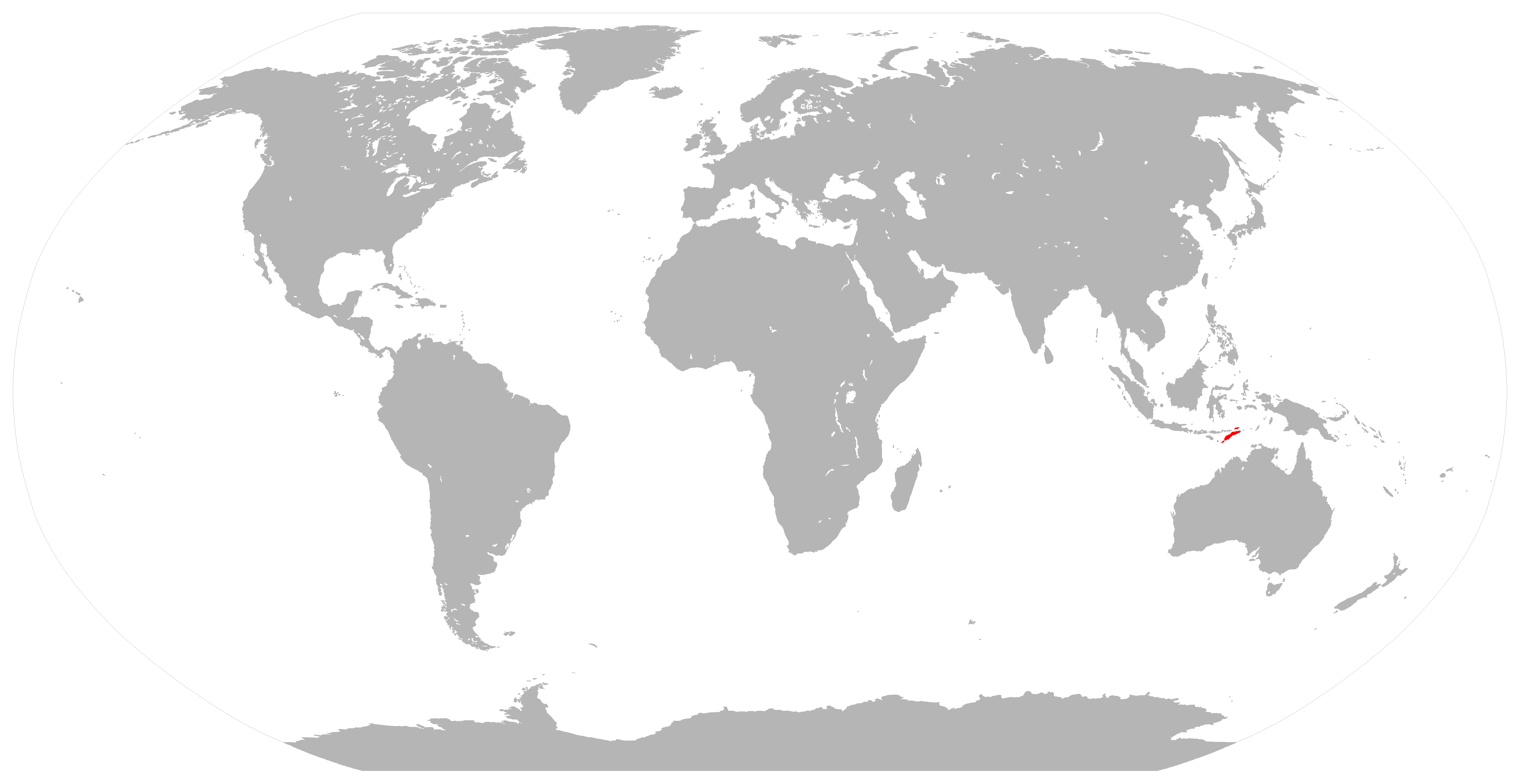

= Plain gerygone =

Species of bird

The plain gerygone (Gerygone inornata) is a species of bird in the family Acanthizidae. It is found on the islands of Wetar and Timor. Its natural habitats are subtropical or tropical moist lowland forest and subtropical or tropical mangrove forest.
