= Nino Konis Santana National Park =

National park in Timor-Leste

Nino Konis Santana National Park Parque Nacional Nino Konis Santana
- IUCN category II (national park)
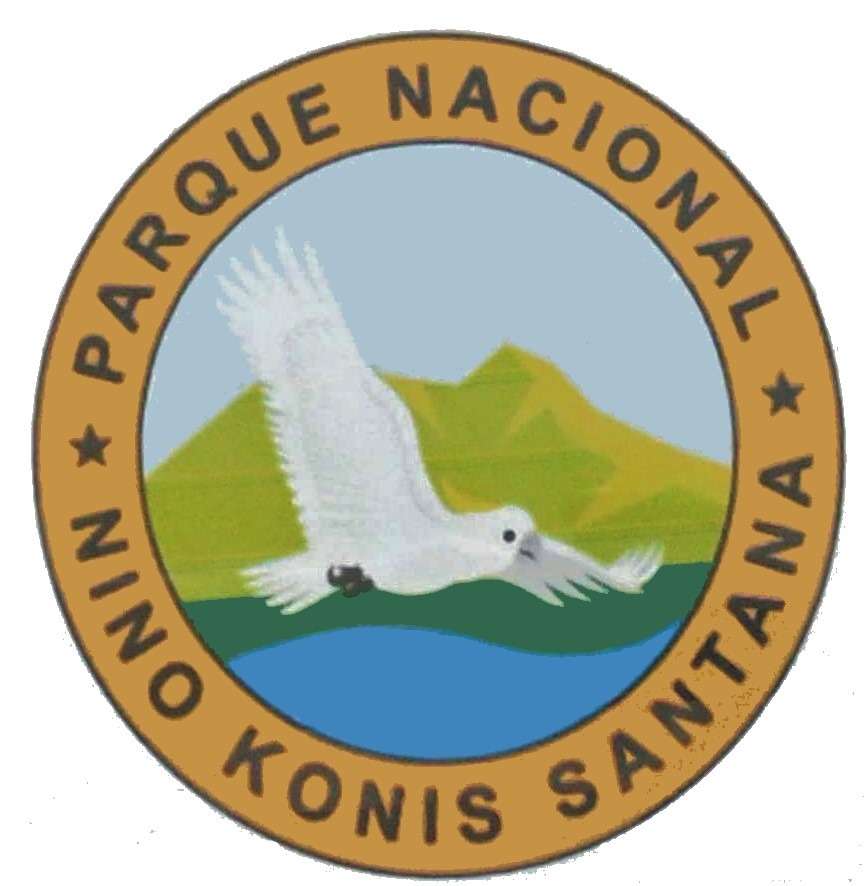
- Park logo

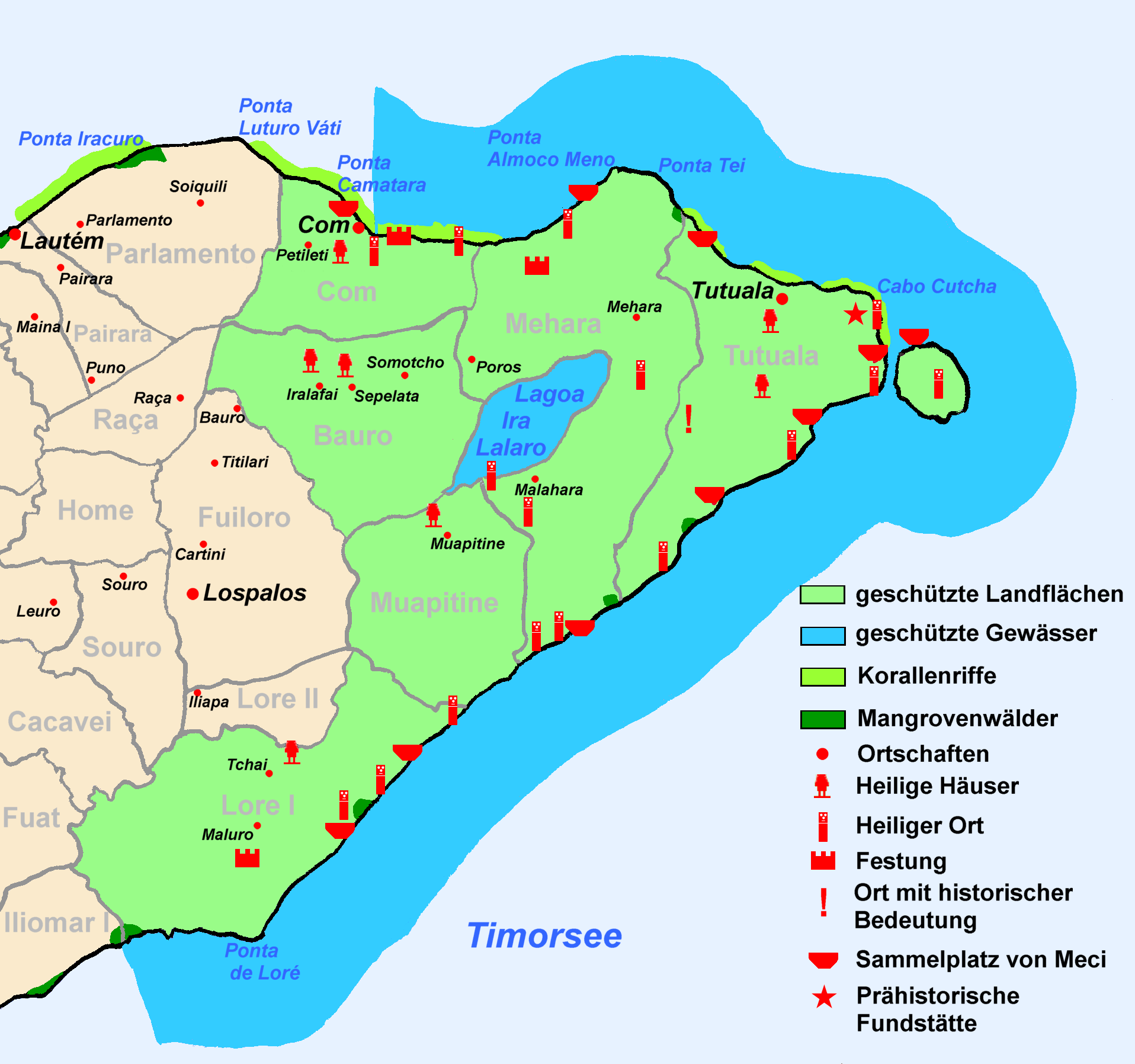
- Location: Timor-Leste
- Nearest city: Tutuala
- Coordinates: 8°27′00″S 127°20′00″E
- Area: 1,236 km^{2} (477 sq mi)
- Established: 2007
- Governing body: Department of Protected Areas and National Parks, Timor-Leste

Nino Konis Santana National Park (Portuguese: Parque Nacional Nino Konis Santana; Tetum: Parke Nasionál Nino Konis Santa) is Timor-Leste's first national park. The park, established on 15 August 2007, covers 1,236 square kilometres (477 sq mi). It links important bird areas such as Lore, Mount Paitchau, Lake Ira Lalaro, and Jaco Island. The park also includes 556 square kilometres (215 sq mi) of the Coral Triangle, an underwater area which supposedly contains the world's greatest diversity of both coral and coral reef fish. Some of the rare birds protected by this park are the critically endangered yellow-crested cockatoo, the endemic Timor green-pigeon, the endangered Timor imperial-pigeon, and the vulnerable Timor sparrow.

The park is named in honor of the independence hero Nino Konis Santana, a former commander of Falintil who was born in Tutuala, a village within the borders of the national park.

== History ==
Part of the park first became a natural conservation reserve during the occupation of the country by Indonesia in the period from 1975–1999. When the country was under the United Nations (UN) Control as United Nations Transitional Administration in Timor Leste (UNTEAT), the same area was declared a “protected wild area” (but combined Tutuala beach and its adjoining forest) in 2000 under Regulation Number 2000/19. The cultural heritage of the five villages and the 15,000 people with their ancient ancestral heritage was made integral to the protected area. It was designated as a Category V Landscape/Sea Scape under IUCN, which considers both nature and culture of the area as one unit for conservation and preservation, and which is akin to the criteria of Cultural Landscapes adopted for UNESCO World Heritage Sites.

Following the independence of the country in 2002, along with the scientific assessment of Important Bird Areas in the country, action to identify and declare the first National Park was also undertaken by Bird Life International in association with the Department of Environment and Climate Change (DECC), New South Wales, (Australia) and Australian Volunteers International, with financial assistance provided by Regional Natural Heritage Programme of the Australian Government, Keidanren Nature Conservation Fund (Japan), and the Darwin Initiative of the Government of the United Kingdom.

In June 2026, UNESCO designated Nino Konis Santana National Park as Timor-Leste's first Biosphere Reserve under its Man and the Biosphere (MAB) Programme. The designation recognised the park for its exceptional combination of terrestrial and marine ecosystems, including the country's largest remaining primary forests, extensive coral reefs within the Coral Triangle, and the rich cultural heritage of the Fataluku people. The designation also highlighted the integration of biodiversity conservation with the sustainable development of local communities, recognising the park as an example of the joint protection of natural and cultural heritage.

The designation represented the first UNESCO Biosphere Reserve in Timor-Leste and one of the newest additions to the World Network of Biosphere Reserves.

== Geography ==
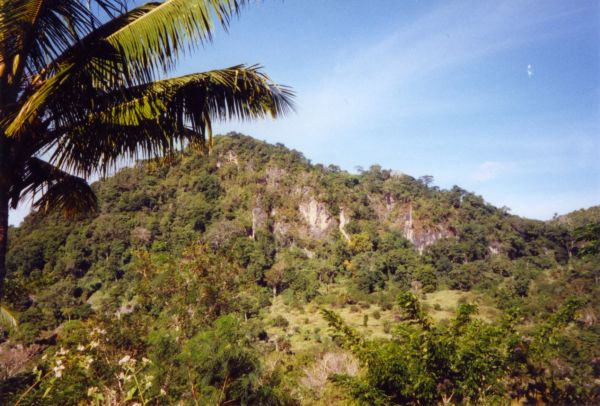
A mountain near Tutuala

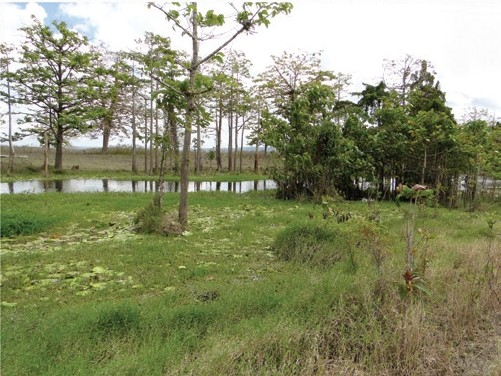
Lake Ira Lalaro floodplain and surrounding area

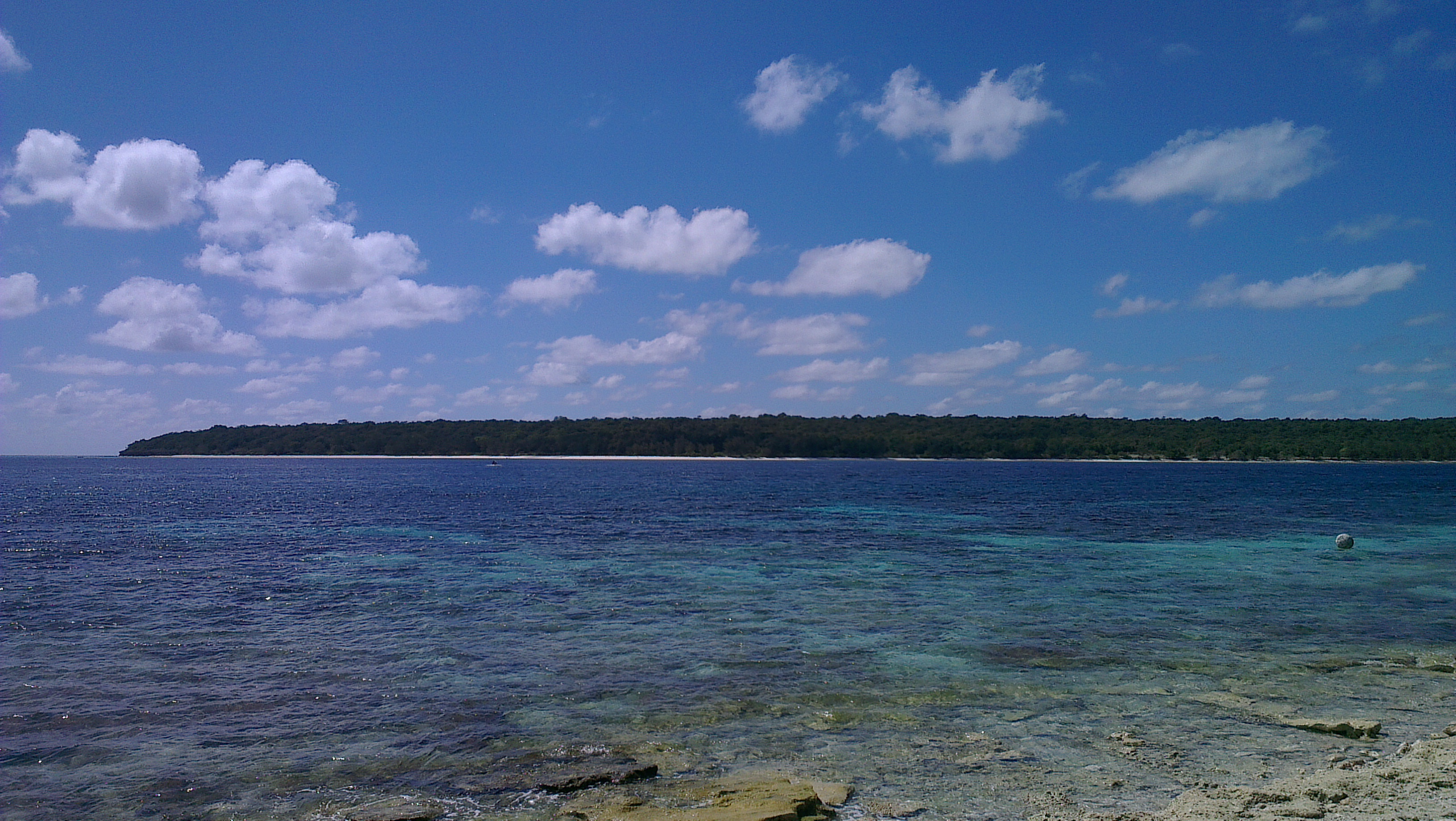
View of Jaco Island from Valu Beach

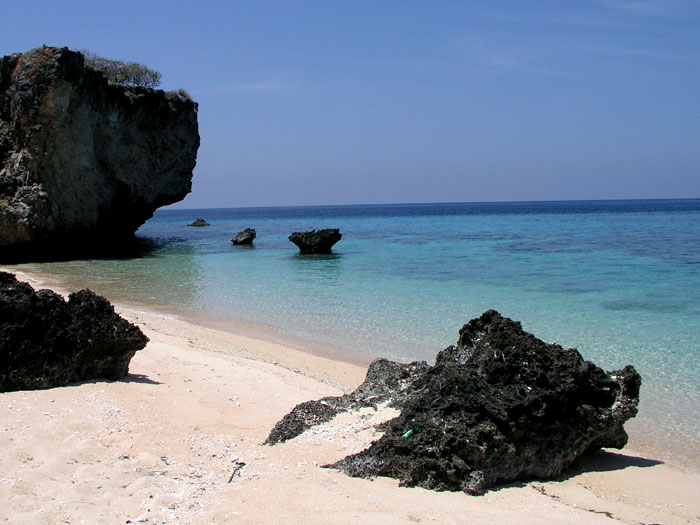
Com Beach

Located at the eastern tip of the island, the park covers 125,600 hectares (310,000 acres), It is constituted by a terrestrial area of 68,000 hectares (170,000 acres) constituting lowland, tropical and monsoon forest; and a marine area of 55,600 hectares (137,000 acres), part of the Coral Triangle. The national park also links the Important Bird Areas of Loré, Monte Paitchau, Lake Ira Lalaro and Jaco Island, identified through biological surveys undertaken by BirdLife International after the country attained independence in 2002, which cover 25,000 hectares (62,000 acres) of the park.

There are six villages within the national park, including Bauro, Com, Tutuala, Méhara and Maupitine, while Malahara is a hamlet. Former settlements include Mua Mimiraka, Lo Chami, and Lori Lata. Walled settlements are found at Tutuala, Lori Lata, Lopomalai, Ili Mimiraka, Mua Mimiraka, and Tutun (Tutunca'u). Lautem District features Lake Iralaloro. Shell midden sites are situated at Kusu Midden and Valu Beach Midden. Oirata Latamoko, situated at Manuméri Hoiku, is considered to be an ancestral landing site for the Koawatea villagers. Of the rock shelters, Léné Ara (or Lene Hara) contains internationally exceptional heritage value; Jerimalai's occupation is dated to more than 40,000 years BP, while Matja Kuru 2 is dated to 32,000 years BP, and Matja Kuru 1 is dated to c. 14,000 BP. The Paichao Range is situated along the south coast. Cape Hero is also known as Tanjung Tei. Jaco Island (or Totina) is seen from Ili Kérékéré cliff. The Fuiloro Plateau is also located with the NP.

Moist deciduous lowland forest and evergreen forest on the hills are the vegetation types in the park, apart from the marshy lands of Lake Ira Lalaro. Primary forests are a notable feature of the flora in the park. Dry deciduous, swamp forest and coastal strand vegetation are also the floral varieties recorded in the park.

== Wildlife ==
=== Flora ===
Vegetation types which are part of the common usage of the people are medicinal plants, bamboo, and canoe trees. The lake's flood plains have grass vegetation which are used by the villagers of Mehara and Maupitine for grazing their livestock. Wetlands of the flood plains are also used for growing rice and tobacco, and also distilling palm liquor as part of their living needs.

=== Fauna ===
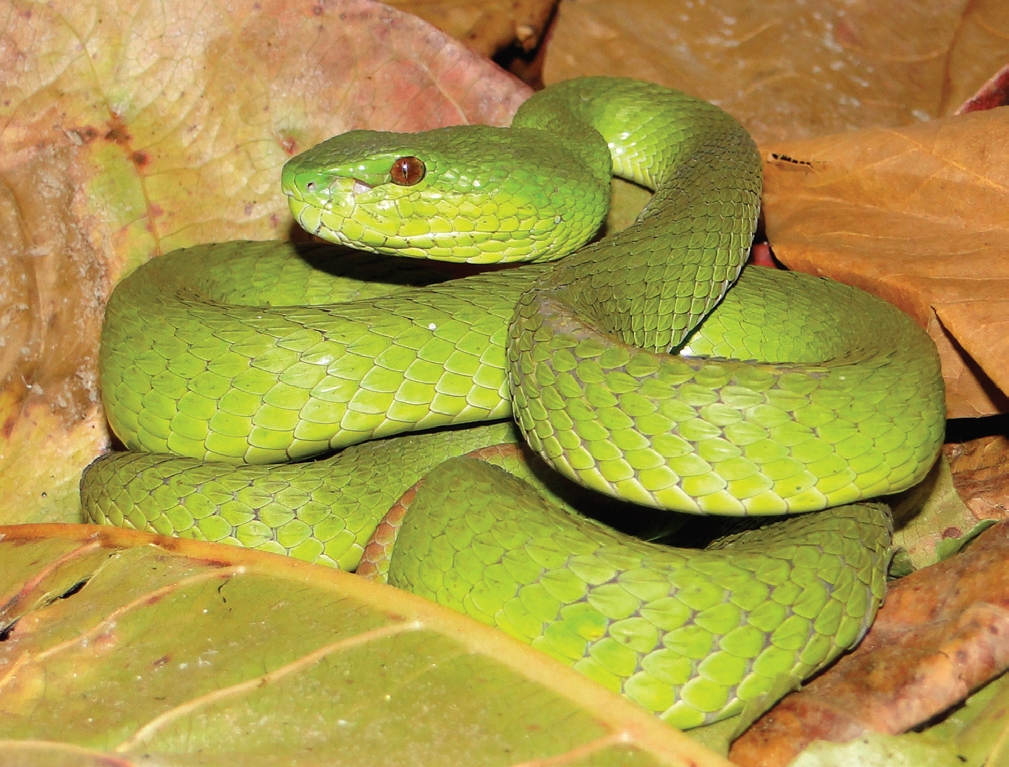
Trimeresurus insularis snake from Lake Ira Lalaro's floodplain.

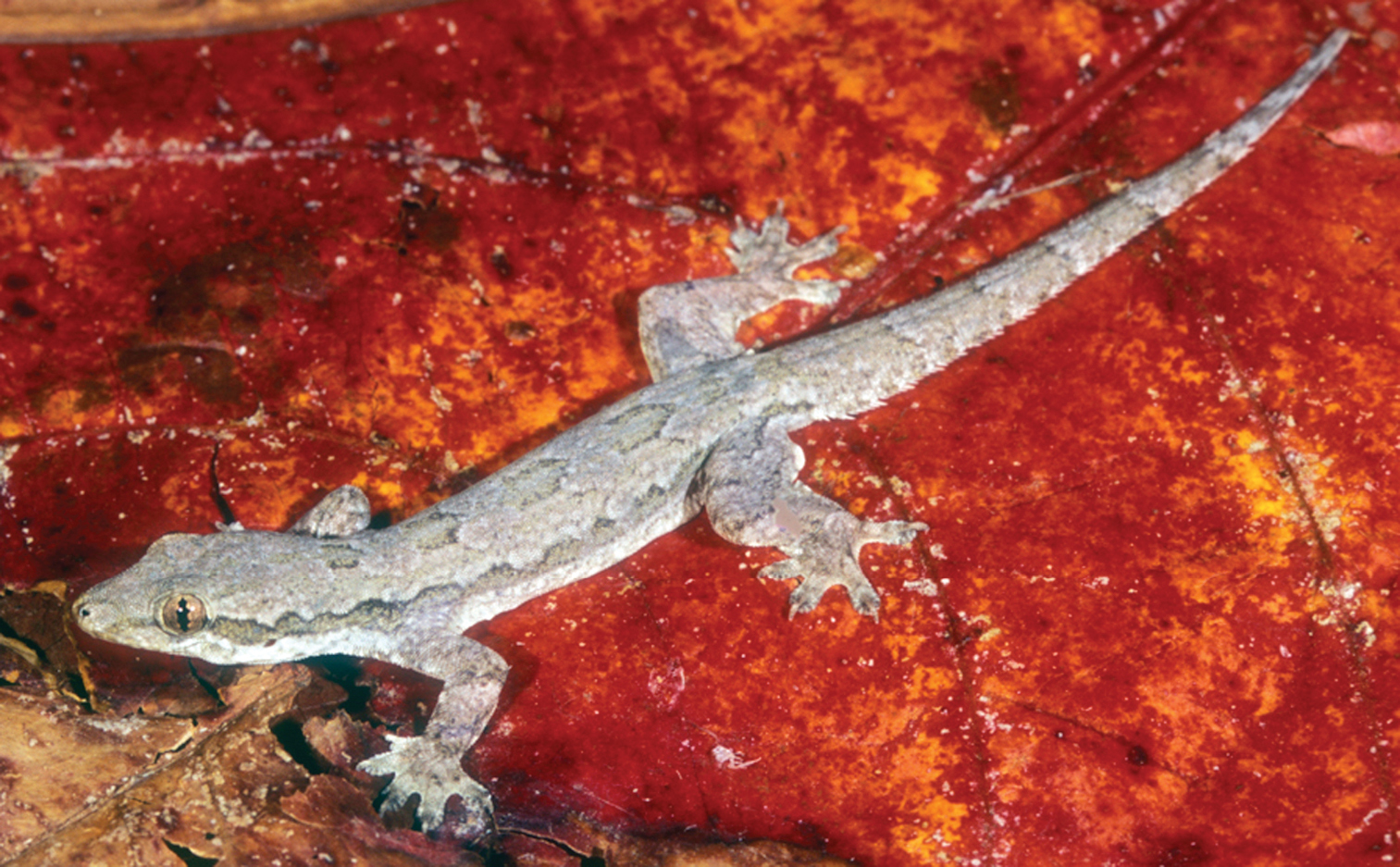
Flat-tailed house gecko from Loré.

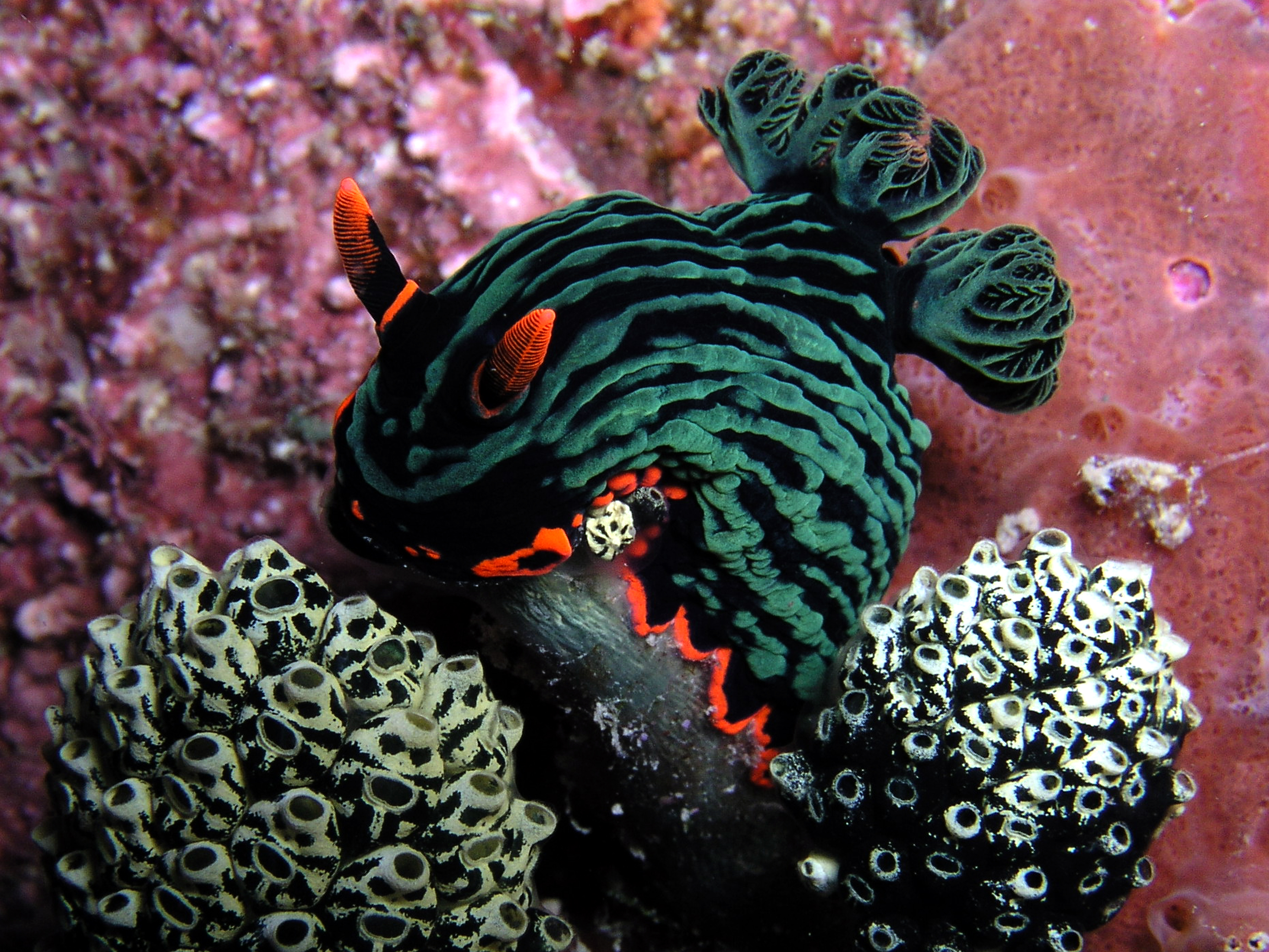
Nembrotha kubaryana feeding on tunicates

There are Timor endemic and scientifically undescribed shrews and bat species in the park. More than 20 native bat species have been recorded in the park. There are also a series of described and undescribed giant rats known from sub-fossil deposits, which may now be extinct. Several mammals were introduced from outside the island during late prehistoric and historic times when people had started inhabiting the area. Some of the common species seen in the wild are birds, bats, murids and most commonly exploited northern common cuscus (Phalanger orientalis) which is reported to have been introduced from Papua New Guinea about 9,000 years ago.

The Coral Triangle part of the park is one of the greatest diversity areas for coral and coral reef fish in the world. Marine resources which also form the livelihood of the coastal villages of Com and Tutuala are species of pelagic fish, shellfish, turtle (ipitu), meci (sea worms) during the season and sardines (api moko). Catfish and bream are harvested from Lake Ira Lalaro.

==== Avifauna ====
The terrestrial area of the park has 200 bird species, of which the endangered species are Timor green pigeon (Treron psittaceus) (the cause for the species getting recorded under the endangered list is the loss of monsoon forest due to deforestation) and the yellow-crested cockatoo (Cacatua sulphurea), a critically endangered species affected due local captures in Wallacea for regional and global trade. About 10 Timor-endemic bird species occur in the park. The globally threatened and globally restricted-range bird species listed by the Bird Life International are the following.

- Dusky cuckoo-dove Macropygia magna
- Slaty cuckoo-dove Turacoena modesta (NT, RR)
- Timor green-pigeon Treron psittaceus (EN, RR)
- Pink-headed imperial-pigeon Ducula rosacea (NT, RR)
- Yellow-crested cockatoo Cacatua sulphurea (CR)
- Olive-shouldered parrot Aprosmictus jonquillaceus (RR)
- Cinnamon-banded kingfisher Todiramphus australasia (RR)
- Streaky-breasted honeyeater Meliphaga reticulata (RR)
- Plain friarbird Philemon inornatus (RR)
- Yellow-eared honeyeater Lichmera flavicans (RR)
- Red-rumped myzomela Myzomela vulnerata (RR)
- Plain gerygone Gerygone inornata (RR)
- Fawn-breasted whistler Pachycephala orpheus (RR)
- Timor figbird Sphecotheres viridis (RR)
- Olive-brown oriole Oriolus melanotis (RR)
- Timor stubtail Urosphena subulata (RR)
- Spot-breasted white-eye Heleia muelleri (NT, RR)
- Orange-banded thrush Zoothera peronii (NT, RR)
- White-bellied bushchat Saxicola gutturalis (NT)
- Black-banded flycatcher Ficedula timorensis (NT)
- Timor blue-flycatcher Cyornis hyacinthinus (RR)
- Red-chested flowerpecker Dicaeum maugei (RR)
- Flame-breasted sunbird Nectarinia solaris (RR)
- Tricoloured parrotfinch Erythrura tricolor (RR)

Legend: CR - critically endangered; EN - endangered; NT - near threatened; RR - restricted-range (global range less than 50,000 km2)

At the request of the Timor-Leste government, Conservation International conducted a rapid marine biodiversity assessment of reefs in the Nino Konis Santana area in August 2012. The work was later documented in a rapid-assessment report published by Conservation International Timor-Leste.

== Cultural value ==
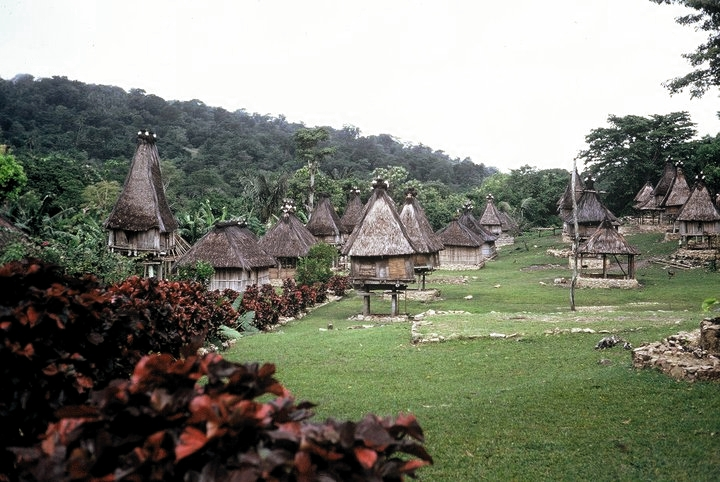
Ioro, Tutuala

Over 200 cultural sites have been identified within the national park. The settlements in the park are inhabited by Fataluku people who speak a linguistically-distinct language and consider themselves to be ethnically distinct from those who do not speak their language. The Fataluku have many ritualistic sites (lupurasa) within the park. Nino Konis Santana National Park contains many rock art sites, with paintings on walls of limestone terraces and also in caves, as well as a rock engraving site. Printed sacred cloth with some of the rock art forms is exchanged during marriage ceremonies. These art forms are also seen carved on ratu houses and on Catholic headstones. Many rock shelters and caves with ancestral figures of heritage value have also been recorded in the park, apart from ancient walled and open settlements, shell middens, artifacts of pottery made of stone and shells, burial sites, and water sources.

== See also ==
- List of Important Bird Areas in Timor-Leste

== Bibliography ==
- Miksic, John Norman; Goh, Geok Yian; O'Connor, Sue (2011). Rethinking Cultural Resource Management in Southeast Asia: Preservation, Development, and Neglect. Anthem Press. ISBN 978-0-85728-389-4.
- Sparks, Karen Jacobs (2008). Encyclopædia Britannica 2008. Encyclopædia Britannica (India) Pvt. Limited. ISBN 978-1-59339-425-7.
