= Ira Lalaro =

Lake in East Timor

Lake Ira Lalaro
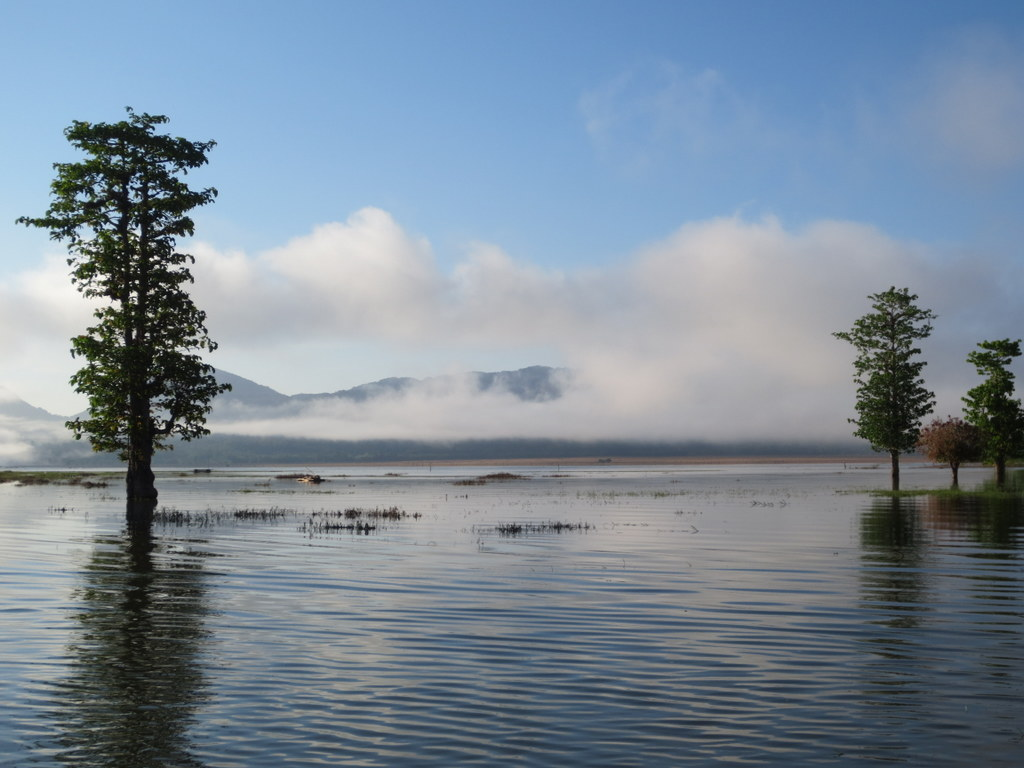
- Lake Ira Lalaro

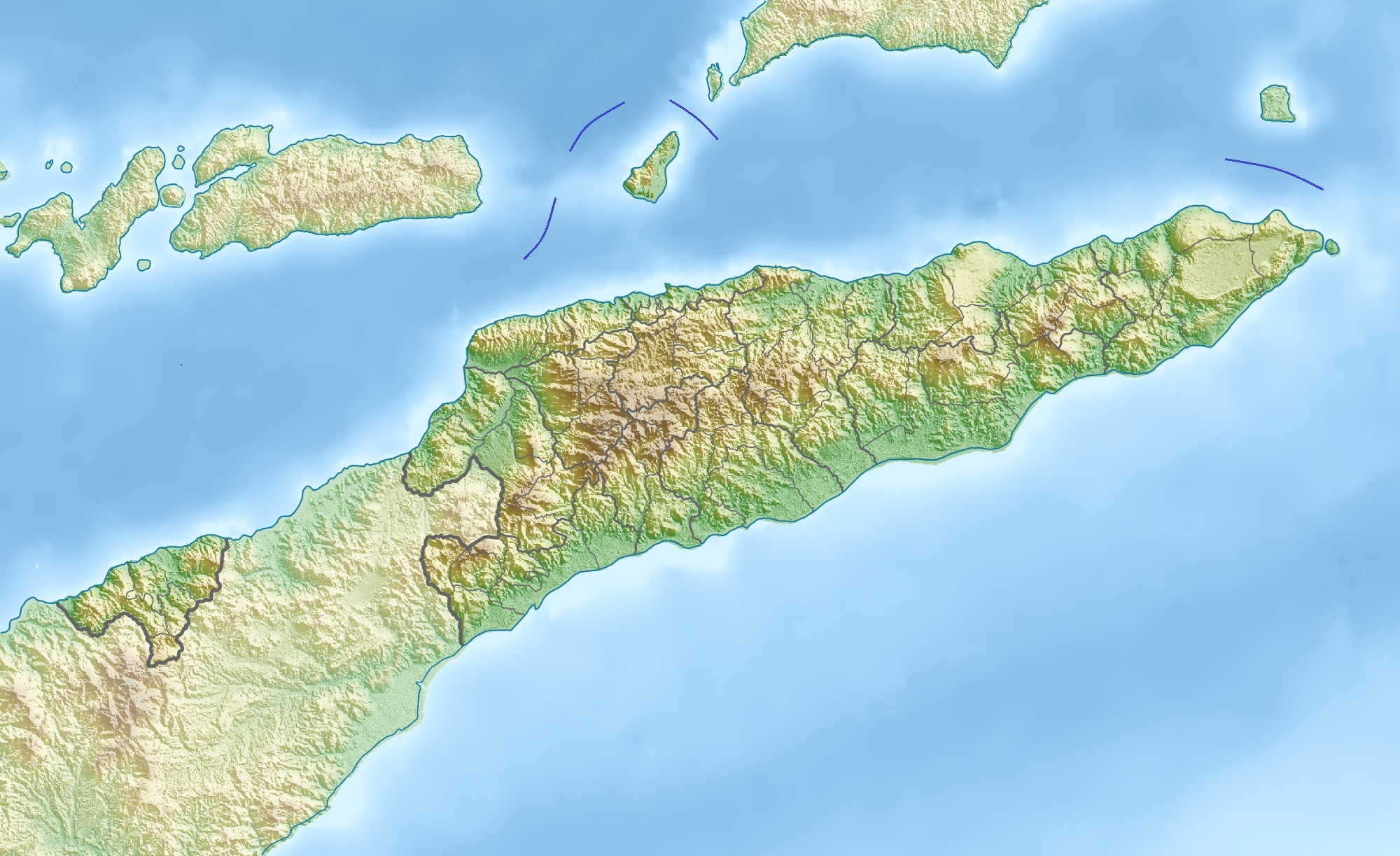
- Location within East Timor
- Coordinates: 8°27′0″S 127°8′0″E
- Primary outflows: Irasiquero River
- Basin countries: East Timor
- Max. length: 6.5 km (4.0 mi)
- Max. width: 3 km (1.9 mi)
- Surface area: Average 1.9 km^{2} (0.73 sq mi)
- Surface elevation: 318 m (1,043 ft)
- Settlements: Mehara, Malahara, Poros, Muapitine

Lake Ira Lalaro (also Iralalaro, Ira-Lalaro, Surubec, Suro Bec) is a freshwater lake in Mehara, Subdistrict Tutuala, Lautém District, East Timor. It is the largest of the island of Timor, and thus too of the country. The lake is part of the Mount Paitchau Important Bird Area. The lake waters and that of Irasiquero River are a closed aquatic system; they lie within a huge polje. It covers between 10–55 square kilometres (3.9–21.2 sq mi) while the authigenic catchment basin covers 406 square kilometres (157 sq mi).

== Geography and geology ==
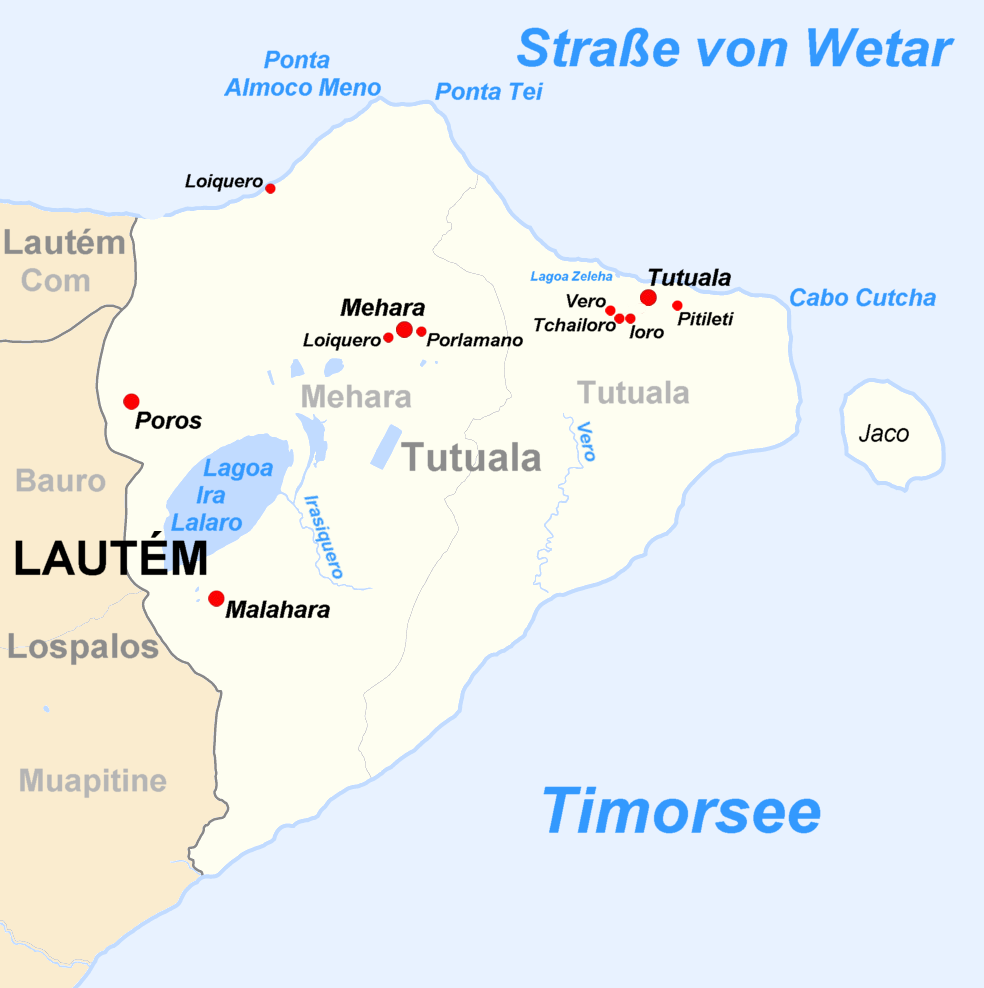
Tutuala Subdistrict

Ira Lalaro is in the far east of Timor island, and is part of the Nino Konis Santana National Park (680 square kilometres (260 sq mi), which was established in August 2007 by East Timor.

The lake is located in a basin bounded by the Paitchau Mountains, within the Lospalos plateau. The region has karstic formations of limestone, with dolines, blind valleys, caves and springs. Ira Lalaro has an average water spread area of 1,900 hectares (4,700 acres), which varies from 1,000–5,500 hectares (2,500–13,600 acres). It is in a high plateau depression at an elevation of 334 metres (1,096 ft) "formed by a huge polje karst formation". The lake flows to the east and as the lake water recedes during the dry season the land exposed becomes a pasture or scrubby grassland.

The lake basin is surrounded by tropical dry forest which is of biodiversity value. The Irasiquero River, which originates from Lake Ira Lalaru, disappears in the main sink hole, the Mainina, about 3.5 kilometres (2.2 mi) downstream of the lake outlet, and does not re-appear; tracer studies indicate that the underground route of water flow leads to the coast. There are human settlements in the area.

== Biodiversity ==
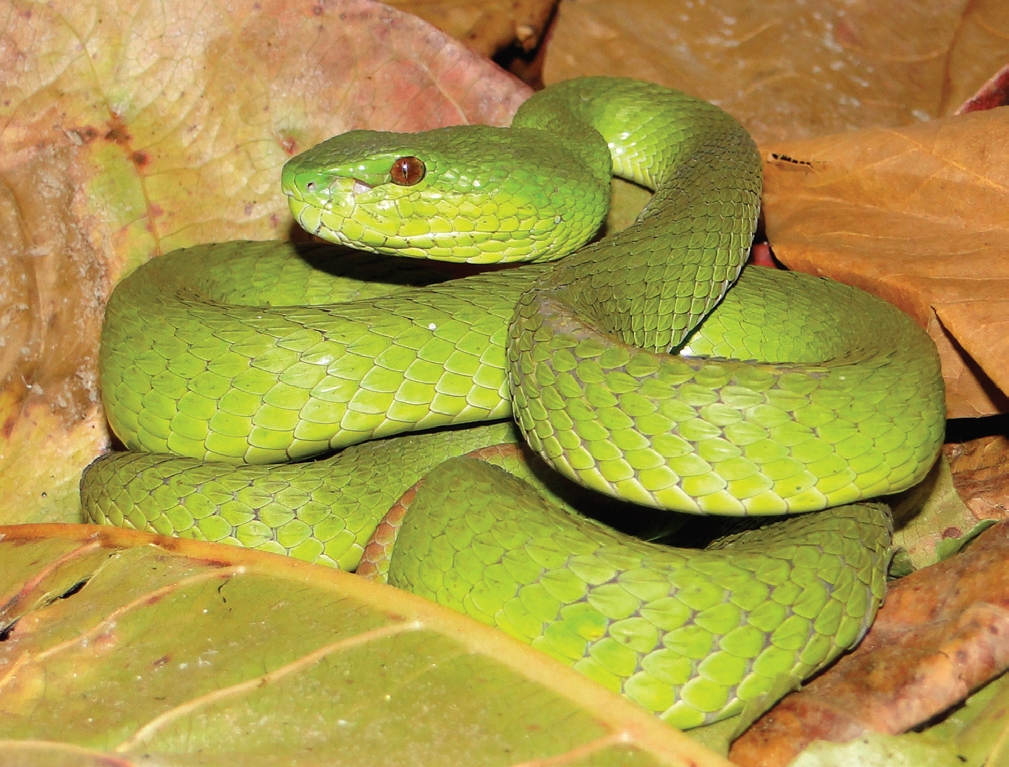
Trimeresurus insularis snake in the lake's floodplain

The biodiversity of the lake's aquatic system, including the Irasiquero River, is that of a wetland ecosystem. The forest area is largely undisturbed. In the absence of continuous surface water flow, the invertebrates found in the lake and in the river consist of macroinvertebrate belonging to 57 families but sans decapod crustaceans.

The Island pitviper (Trimeresurus insularis) and wood scorpions (Lychas mucronatus) are reported in the flood plains of the lake. Estuarine crocodiles (Crocodylus porosus) (about 300–350) are also found in the lake. They are not hunted by local people as they are their totem animal connected to their creation story and known as "lafaek" in the Tetum language. Boats are banned on the lake, based on a traditional belief that the fish in the lake will die when boats enter the water. Customarily, villagers were forced to stand in the water to fish, and fatal crocodile attacks were common. As of 2006, fishermen appeared to be using rafts to avoid crocodile attacks. Between 2015 and 2024, there were 12 fatal attacks.

The Timor snake-necked turtle (Chelodina mccordi timorensis) is also endemic to the lake and the river. The local dialect name is ‘‘beo’’, the Tetum name is "lenok kakorok ular" and an alternative English name is Timor long-necked turtle. Chelodina mccordi is considered to be one of the 25 most endangered turtles in the world and is protected under CITES Appendix II. There are 21 fish species in the lake including an endemic species of hardyhead (Craterocephalus laisapi), found in the middle section of the Irasiquero River.

In a number of field surveys of East Timorese waterbirds and coastal seabirds of carried out in the 2000s, the lake's wetland was identified as one of three wetlands of high national significance in that country, and as being one of the most notable wetlands in Wallacea.

The lake area has both migratory and resident water birds. It is part of the Mount Paitchau and Lake Ira Lalaro Important Bird Area (IBA). One of globally threatened bird species reported is the yellow-crested cockatoo (Cacatua sulphur), which is considered critically endangered. Other species reported are: Australian pelican (Pelecanus conspicillatus), wandering whistling duck (Dendrocygna arcuata), common coot (Fulica atra), Swinhoe's snipe (Gallinago megala), Australasian grebe (Tachybaptus novaehollandiae), Timor green pigeon (Treron psittaceus), cinnamon-banded kingfisher (Todiramphus australasia), spot-breasted white-eye (Heleia muelleri), and black-banded flycatcher (Ficedula timorensis). There are 16 species of bats (cave roosters), including Geoffroy's rousette fruit bat (Rousettus amplexicaudatus), Canut's horseshoe bat (Rhinolophus canuti), and Sumba round leaf bat (Hipposideros sumbae).
