= Paitchau =

Mountain in East Timor

- Gunung Paitchau
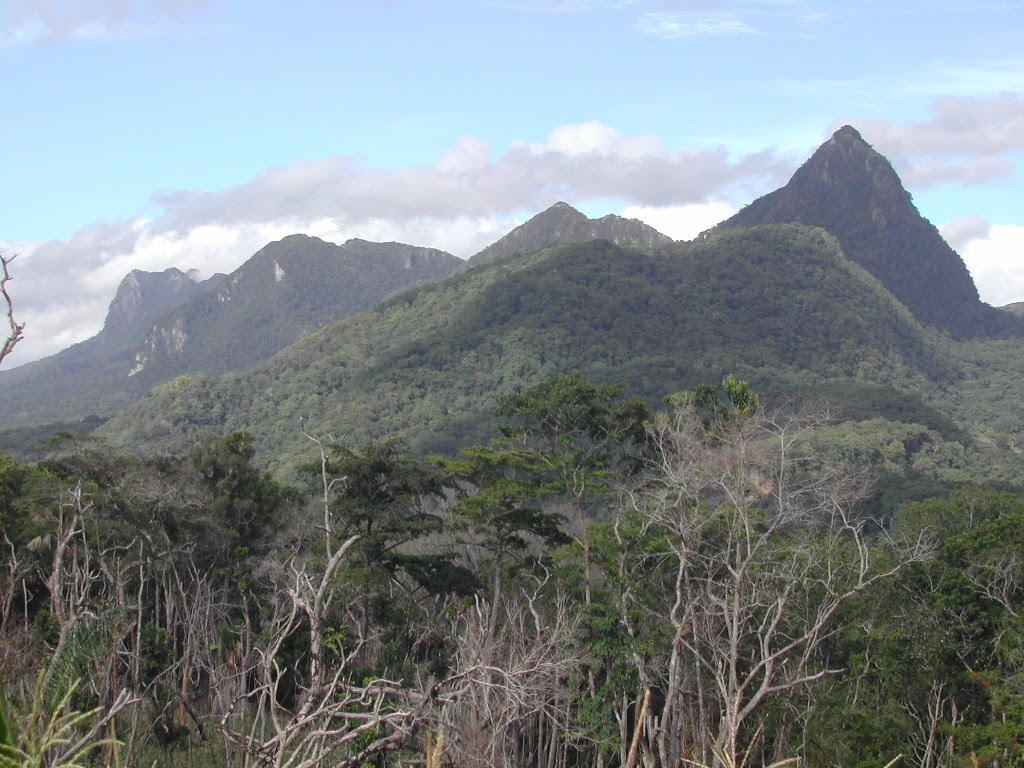
- View west along the Paitchau Range from near Tutuala

Highest point
- Elevation: 960 m (3,150 ft)
- Coordinates: 8°30′17″S 127°09′52″E

Geography
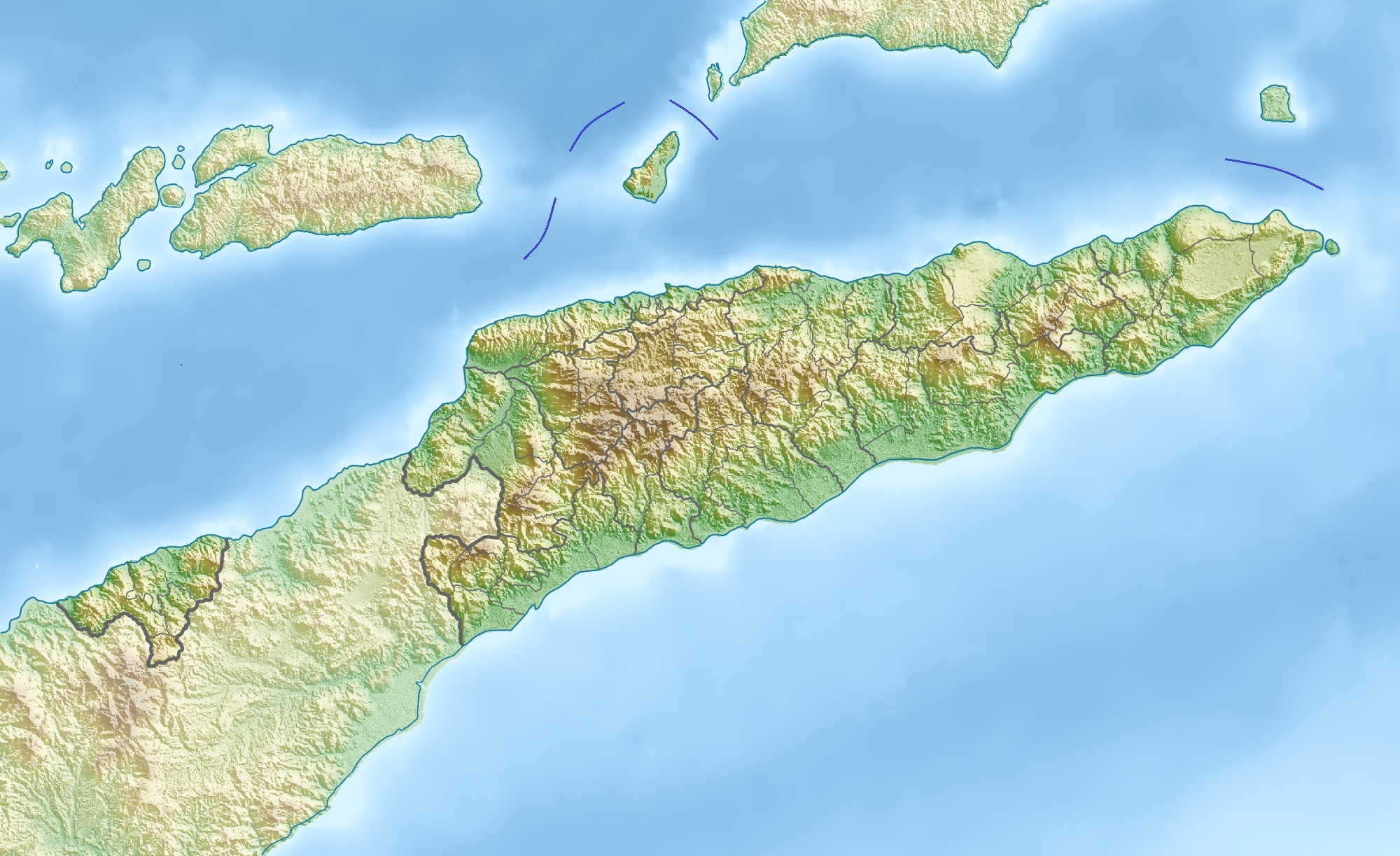
- Location within East Timor
- Location: Lautém District, East Timor

Paitchau (also Gunung Paitchau, or Paitchao, or Paitxau; locally, Pai Tekau Ile) is a mountain in the Tutuala subdistrict, Lautém District of East Timor. Situated within Nino Konis Santana National Park, it is south of Lake Ira Lalaro. Though part of a mountain chain, Paitchau is an isolated mountain in the southern Sucos Mehara. It ranges in altitude from 0–960 metres (0–3,150 ft). BirdLife International has classified the mountain and its surrounding region of 55,797 hectares (137,880 acres) as an Important Bird Area of East Timor. The area contained within the Paitchau Range and Ira Lalaro is sparsely populated and contains several unique faunal and floral species.

== Geography ==
Paitchau is a sharp peak, prominent from the southwest. The hill range is located in the extreme eastern part of Timor-Leste and it slopes towards the coastline of Lore and Silvicola which have coral reefs. The area is thinly populated and has diverse flora and fauna. Its slopes are steep and the southern part of the range towards the coast is thickly forested. The range rises to a maximum height of 960 metres (3,150 ft) or 1,030 metres (3,380 ft) and is made up of massive primary karst limestone formations.

== Flora and fauna ==
Paitchau is characterized by tropical moist deciduous lowland forest and tropical mixed evergreen forest. There is swamp land around Ira Lalaro. Paitchau is said to contain "the best remaining 'primary’ forest" in the country.

=== Fauna ===
Avifauna

There are 24 restricted-range species (listed below) in the Important Bird Area which includes the endangered Treron psittaceus (Timor green-pigeon), and the critically endangered Cacatua sulphurea (yellow-crested cockatoo).

Critically endangered

- Yellow-crested cockatoo (Cacatua sulphurea)

Endangered

- Timor green-pigeon (Treron psittaceus)

Near threatened

- Slaty cuckoo-dove (Turacoena modesta)
- Pink-headed imperial-pigeon (Ducula rosacea)
- Spot-breasted white-eye (Heleia muelleri)
- Orange-banded thrush (Zoothera peronii)
- White-bellied bushchat (Saxicola gutturalis)
- Black-banded flycatcher (Ficedula timorensis)
- Olive-shouldered parrot (Aprosmictus jonquillaceus)
- Cinnamon-banded kingfisher (Todiramphus australasia)

Least concern

- Dusky cuckoo-dove (Macropygia magna)
- Streaky-breasted honeyeater (Meliphaga reticulata)
- Plain friarbird (Philemon inornatu)
- Yellow-eared honeyeater (Lichmera flavicans)
- Red-rumped myzomela (Myzomela vulnerata)
- Plain gerygone (Gerygone inornata)
- Fawn-breasted whistler (Pachycephala orpheus)
- Timor figbird (Sphecotheres viridis)
- Olive-brown oriole (Oriolus melanotis)
- Timor stubtail (Urosphena subulata)
- Timor leaf-warbler (Phylloscopus presbytes)
- Timor blue-flycatcher (Cyornis hyacinthinus)
- Red-chested flowerpecker (Dicaeum maugei)
- Flame-breasted sunbird (Nectarinia solaris)
- Tricoloured parrotfinch (Erythrura tricolor)

== Bibliography ==
- Bird, Eric (2010). Encyclopedia of the World's Coastal Landforms. Springer. ISBN 978-1-4020-8638-0.
- Hydrographic Dept (1983). Indonesia pilot. Great Britain. Hydrographer of the Navy.
- Miksic, John N.; Goh, Geok Yian; O'Connor, Sue (2011). Rethinking Cultural Resource Management in Southeast Asia: Preservation, Development, and Neglect. Anthem Press. ISBN 978-0-85728-389-4.
- Tiwary, Shiv Shanker; Choudhary, P.S. (1 January 2009). Encyclopaedia Of Southeast Asia And Its Tribes (Set Of 3 Vols.). Anmol Publications Pvt. Ltd. ISBN 978-81-261-3837-1.
