= Lore =

Lore may refer to:

== Places ==
- Loré, former French commune
- Loré Administrative Post, an administrative post in Timor-Leste
- Lore City, Ohio, US
- Lore Kingdom, former kingdom in Indonesia

== Arts and media ==
- Lore (Star Trek), a fictional android
- Lore (2012 film), a 2012 Australian-German film
- Lore (2023 film), a 2023 British film
- Lore (podcast)
  - Lore (TV series), based on the podcast
- Lore (Clannad album)
- Lore (Today I Caught the Plague album)
- Lore, a 2021 novel by Alexandra Bracken
- Lorè (born 1996), Albanian singer

== Other uses ==
- Folklore, acquired knowledge or traditional beliefs
- Oral lore, orally conveyed cultural knowledge and traditions
- Lore (name), a list of people with the given name and surname
- Lore (anatomy), the region between the eyes and nostrils of birds, reptiles, and amphibians
- Lore peoples, an ethnic group in Indonesia
- Lore (version control system)

== See also ==
- Canon (fiction), the material accepted as officially part of a story
- Iore, a class of rail locomotives
- Lores (disambiguation)
- Loure (disambiguation)
