= Nino Konis Santana =

East Timorese freedom fighter

Nino Konis Santana (12 January 1957 – 11 March 1998) was an East Timorese freedom fighter who led the Falintil guerrilla forces between April 1993 and his death in March 1998 during the Indonesian occupation of East Timor, succeeding Ma'Huno Bulerek Karathayano after the latter's capture in 1993. Santana died in 1998 and was succeeded by Taur Matan Ruak.

== Early life and education ==
Nino Konis Santana was born on 12 January 1957 in Vero, suco Tutuala, on the eastern tip of Timor island in what was then the Lautém District of Portuguese Timor. His family were members of the Fataluku people. His father was Je Makaru, a farmer who died of heart disease in 1982, and his mother was Poko Tana. The oldest child in his family, he had a sister, Hermínia Santana, and a brother, Victor Vieira de Araújo. Victor also went on to join Falintil and died in combat on 10 June 1980 near Paitchau mountain in Tutuala. Another source describes Santana as the third son in his family.

When he was born, Santana's mother named him Je Konisu. On 3 March 1964, at the age of seven, his parents had him baptized at the Catholic chapel in Tutuala. Upon being baptized, he was given the Christian name Antoninho Santana, and he soon started going by "Nino". Santana was described as a good-natured, clever child. From an early age, he enjoyed reading, writing poetry, and playing sports including football, basketball, and volleyball.

Santana began his education at the local school in Tutuala in 1963 at the age of six. Recognized for his intelligence, in 1968 he enrolled at the Colégio Dom Bosco in Fuiloro, a Catholic school run by the Salesians of Don Bosco. Santana completed fourth grade in Fuiloro in 1971, with sources varying on where he continued his studies afterward. According to most sources, he completed his pre-secondary education at a Catholic school in Baucau. Another source states that he went to the capital, Dili, to study at a private school led by Francisco Xavier do Amaral, later the first President of Timor-Leste in 1975. Sources agree that in 1973 Santana entered the Escola Engenheiro Canto Resende, a teachers' college in Dili, completing a two-year course as a primary school teacher in 1975. In Dili, Santana lived with several cousins and friends: Lino, Armando da Silva, and Abel da Cruz.

During this time, the 1974 Carnation Revolution occurred in Portugal, and with it the prospect of independence for East Timor. As local East Timorese political parties and student associations began forming, Santana initially remained apolitical, preferring to focus on his studies in the hope of finding work as a teacher to support his family. In a letter, he wrote:

Being depoliticized as I was, I was indifferent to the political situation in East Timor. Freedom and independence meant loss of opportunity and employment for me. I even wanted the previous status quo to remain, because what interested me most was finishing my studies, finding a job, and earning some money to resolve my family's extreme poverty... I didn't join any political party, and even when the first student movement, UNETIM – the National Union of Students of East Timor – was created, I didn't participate in the plenary meeting, as was the case with almost all of my schoolmates. Later, after an extraordinary meeting convened by the organizers of UNETIM, I was appointed a member of the UNETIM governing body at my school, simply because I dared to speak a little at the meeting.

Through UNETIM, Santana began developing relationships with students from other educational institutions, and soon began sympathizing with the pro-independence movement. At the end of the 1974–1975 academic year, he joined Fretilin, the left-wing pro-independence resistance movement. By 1975, he was one of the leaders of the National Union of Timorese Students (UNETIM), which was affiliated with Fretilin. In 1974, he served as a member of the commission that prepared for local chief elections to be held in Lautém in 1975, the first free election in East Timor's history. After completing his teacher training course in 1975, Santana returned to Tutuala and worked as a teacher.

== Indonesian occupation and resistance activities ==
=== Activities in Lautém and Matebian ===
Following the Indonesian invasion of East Timor in 1975, Santana went to the mountains to join Fretilin's resistance activities. Based in Mehara, he became active in the Timor Popular Youth Organization (OPJT), and was given responsibility for the youth and population in the Tutuala area. He tried to reestablish schooling in the area, which had been disrupted by conflict, but was unsuccessful due to the ongoing invasion. Instead, he carried out a literacy campaign among the local population. While in Mehara, Santana wed Luísa Gonzaga in a customary marriage, without a Catholic ceremony. They had one son who died, less than a year old, in 1978 near Loré.

Between 1977 and 1979, Santana served as Fretilin's deputy commissioner responsible for the eastern point (Ponta-Leste) sector. In May–June 1978, the Indonesian military launched an "encirclement and annihilation" operation in East Timor, forcing Santana and others to flee from Mehara to Matebian in Baucau District. His wife and many relatives were captured by the Indonesians. In Matebian, Santana served as a delegate to the Fretilin political commissariat. In November 1978, the base in Matebian fell and the Fretilin members there split up, with some heading west while the others, including Xanana Gusmão, Taur Matan Ruak, and Santana, remaining in the east. On the night of 22 November 1978, they went to Lospalos and made contact with local supporters to continue their resistance activities.

Not long after, on 31 December 1978, Fretilin leader Nicolau Lobato, was killed by Indonesian forces. This was a major blow to morale for the resistance and fractured its leadership. During this period, Santana was mentored by Xanana Gusmão, who encouraged resistance supporters to "cover yourself with the enemy's cloak." Fretilin leaders went from village to village, staying with local families, supported and hidden by the population. Xanana soon began working to reorganize the resistance movement, working closely with Santana in his role as a political commissioner. These efforts were quickly realized in the east, but showed less progress in the west, where resistance leaders were isolated and demoralized and many areas lacked a Fretilin command structure.

In 1979, Santana was reportedly captured by East Timorese soldiers serving in the Indonesian military, but managed to escape into the jungle with the help of some other armed East Timorese. From 1979 to 1980, he served as political assistant for Fretilin for the Talisma region.

=== Guerrilla commander ===
On 3 March 1981, Santana attended Fretilin's national conference, where Xanana Gusmão was elected national political commissar and commander-in-chief of Falintil, Fretilin's armed wing. After the conference, Fretilin divided East Timor into three military regions: Funu Sei Nafatin (Tetum: "The War Will Continue") in the east, Nakroman ("Light") in the center, and Haksolok ("Joy") in the west. Santana was put in charge of the south-central section of the Nakroman region. Nakroman was initially commanded by Virgílio Freitas (nom de guerre Kalisá) until his death in combat in February 1982, and then by Cornélio Ximenes (Mau-Nana). In April 1982, Xanana sent Santana back to Tutuala to support Fretilin's efforts to organize among the population there. He remained in Tutuala until March 1983.

In 1983, Santana was appointed political commissioner for Falintil's Nakroman military region, a position he would hold until 1991. In early May 1985, he attended a meeting of top resistance leaders, including Xanana Gusmão, Taur Matan Ruak, Lere Anan Timur, and others, with the goal of reorganizing the clandestine movement. Afterwards, Santana was given the additional task of leading the western Haksolok military region, which borders Indonesian West Timor. He wrote in a letter at the time that he was "happy to be fighting here, in a land I had never been to before, and whose population I had never met, but who welcome me and give me all the moral, political, material support, and even in matters of life, so that I can fight." Between 1986 and 1991, he often accompanied Xanana on visits to the western region to organize popular support for the guerrillas there and establish better interregional contacts.

In 1990, Santana was nearly killed in an ambush by Indonesian soldiers in Ainaro, suffering bullet wounds to his neck, thigh, and sole. Of his eight-man unit, only two survived: Santana and another comrade, Kakehe, who was shot six times in the back. Both critically wounded, they managed to crawl to safety. Naked and with nothing but a gun, they hid in the bush for a week, eating grass and leaves, while Santana nursed Kakehe's wounds.

In 1991, Santana became vice-secretary of the Fretilin steering committee. That year, he established a base in Mertutu, Ermera District, with the mission of advancing the resistance struggle in the western part of East Timor. Due to the increasingly heavy presence of Indonesian patrols, he initially hid among coffee plantations during the day. For the last six years of his life, Santana lived in small hideout underneath the home of Caetano Lopes Ximenes, a local resistance supporter and fellow Tutuala native. The shelter was accessible via a trapdoor in a back room of the house that served as the family's oratory. A religious man, Santana built a shrine inside the shelter with a handmade cross and a statue of Our Lady of Fátima.

From the hideout, which consisted of a small living room, bedroom, and bathroom, Santana was able to dispatch and receive messages with the help of a messenger service, radio, and later a satellite phone. A Catholic priest, Domingos Maubere, was Santana's most reliable channel of information in and out of the country. Thus, Santana was able to direct the resistance movement's high-level political and military affairs, while his chief of staff, Taur Matan Ruak, who was based elsewhere, managed day-to-day guerrilla operations. On at least one occasion, Indonesian soldiers searched the house looking for Santana, but did not discover his hideout.

=== Leader of the East Timorese resistance ===
Xanana Gusmão appointed Santana as his political assistant in 1992. Following Xanana's capture by the Indonesians in 1992, Santana was named a member of the guerrillas' military policy committee. After the arrest the following year of Xanana's successor Ma'Huno Bulerek Karathayano, on 25 April 1993 Santana assumed political and military leadership of the East Timorese resistance. Santana initially reluctant to take leadership, instead suggesting that one of the more educated East Timorese leaders in exile abroad should be chosen.

Santana became head of Falintil's commanding body, the political-military council, and also took political leadership of Fretilin as secretary of the party's steering committee. He also headed the executive council of the armed front and served, after the disappearance of Keri Laran Sabalae, as secretary of the executive committee of the clandestine front. Santana's assumed leadership at a time when the resistance faced limited funding, dwindling supplies of arms and equipment, and overwhelming opposition from the Indonesian forces, who then counted 1 soldier for every 35 East Timorese civilians. At the time, the number of active guerrillas had been reduced to the hundreds. Despite these difficulties, the civilian population enabled the guerrillas to continue their efforts by providing food and essential supplies.

Santana was described as a principled yet pragmatic leader. In 1994, he negotiated with moderate members of the pro-integrationist Timorese Popular Democratic Association (APODETI) to bring them into fold of the National Council of Maubere Resistance (CNRM), the East Timorese resistance umbrella organization. In August 1994, Santana and José Ramos-Horta, the CNRM's diplomatic leader abroad, offered a ceasefire in exchange for talks, which Indonesia rejected. Militarily, Santana made modest changes to the resistance structure, including reactivating units in the northern zone near Dili. In 1994, journalist Jill Jolliffe went undercover to interview Santana in his hiding place in Mertutu. She found the guerrilla leader in precarious health, suffering from malaria, untreated teeth infections, and wounds from unextracted bullets still lodged in his body.

== Death and aftermath ==
Santana died on 11 March 1998 in Mertutu, Ermera, at the age of 41. Contemporary accounts of his death contain contradictory details, though sources agree he died from untreated health problems. One source attributes his death to an unspecified illness, another points to a heart attack, and many other sources report that he died of injuries sustained from falling into a ravine in the mountains. His death became publicly known on 30 March, when José Ramos-Horta released a statement in Lisbon announcing that Santana had died accidentally in Ainaro District. The Ainaro detail was deliberate misinformation by Fretilin, part of the party's strategy of preventing the Indonesians from learning the whereabouts of its guerrillas. In reality, Santana died not in Ainaro but in his hiding place in Mertutu.

Two days before his death, on 9 March 1988, Santana informed his secretary, José Agostinho Sequeira (nom de guerre Somotxo), who was working on report in a different shelter, that he would be turning off his satellite phone due to the upcoming arrival of a large number of visitors in Mertutu. The parish priest of Ermera would be coming to say mass in the village, and afterward there would be a lunch at the home of Caetano Lopes Ximenes, where Santana's hideout was located. Santana ordered a vase of flowers placed on the trapdoor leading into his underground shelter. On the evening on 11 March, Caetano's children opened the door to the hideout and found Santana dead, sitting motionless against the wall. According to another source, Santana's body was discovered by Somotxo himself. Discreetly and under the cover of night to avoid Indonesian detection, Caetano and his family buried Santana in Mertutu and informed Falintil's leadership of his death. After Santana's death, field command of the resistance passed to Taur Matan Ruak, his chief of staff.

On 18 December 2012, Santana's remains were reinterred at the new Garden of the Heroes in Metinaro, east of the capital, Dili, in a ceremony attended by many Timorese government officials and members of Santana's family. The remains of a number of other leading resistance figures were exhumed and transferred to Metinaro at the same time.

== Legacy ==
Santana has been described as a national hero and unifying figure in Timor-Leste. In a statement announcing his death on 30 March 1998, Fretilin diplomatic leader José Ramos-Horta wrote that Santana was "an architect of East Timorese National Unity, reconciliation and tolerance" who impressed with "the clarity of his thinking, intellect and vision." Ramos-Horta declared his death "a tragic loss for the People of East Timor." On 13 May 2008, Santana was declared one of 15 "leading figures" of Timor-Leste's national liberation struggle in a ceremony led by Prime Minister Xanana Gusmão. The surprise announcement came at an event to mark the start of pension payments awarded by the state to members of the resistance against the Indonesian occupation and the families of martyrs who died in the struggle. On 18 December 2012, when Santana's remains were transferred to the Garden of the Heroes in Metinaro, the National Parliament of Timor-Leste issued a statement of posthumous tribute, describing him as a "valiant and intrepid figure" and one of Timor-Leste's "great heroes and leaders, to whom the Nation owes so much."

Santana's burial place in Mertutu has often been visited by groups coming to pay tribute to Santana, even after his remains were exhumed and moved elsewhere. The discrepancies between various accounts of his death, along with the secretive nature of his nighttime burial, have contributed to a folk mythology surrounding Santana. He is revered by at least one quasi-religious group in rural Timor-Leste, and after his death some East Timorese continued to hold out hope for his reappearance.

A collection of Santana's personal documents were discovered in Mertutu in 2002 and have been included in the collection of the Timorese Resistance Archive and Museum in Dili since its inauguration in 2005. A replica model of Santana's hidden shelter in Mertutu, along with the clothes and shoes he was originally buried in, are also on display at the museum. On 11 March 2025, the Konis Santana Memory Foundation (Tetum: Fundasaun Memória Konis Santana) held a groundbreaking ceremony for the new Nino Konis Santana Civic and Cultural Center in Tutuala, Santana's hometown.

In 2007, Timor-Leste's first national park, encompassing 1,236 square kilometres (477 sq mi) in Lautém Municipality, was named after Santana. Included within national park is Tutuala, Santana's birthplace. The meeting room of Timor-Leste's Nicolau Lobato Presidential Palace in Dili is named for Santana. At least two schools also bear his name, including Escola Secundária Geral Nino Konis Santana in Gleno, Ermera Municipality, which was renamed in Santana's honor in 2002, and Ensino Secundário Geral Nino Konis Santana in Lospalos, Lautém Municipality, which was renamed and inaugurated in 2004.

== See also ==
- Indonesian invasion of East Timor
