= Lores =

Lores may refer to:

- Lore (anatomy)
- Lores (surname)
- Lo-res

== See also ==
- Lore (disambiguation)
