= Conservation International Timor-Leste =

Country programme of Conservation International in Timor-Leste

- Abbreviation: CI Timor-Leste
- Formation: 2009
- Type: Country programme
- Headquarters: Dili, Timor-Leste
- Region served: Timor-Leste
- Fields: Protected area management; marine conservation; community natural resource management; sustainable tourism
- Parent organization: Conservation International
- Website: timor-leste.conservation.org

Conservation International Timor-Leste (CI Timor-Leste) is the Timor-Leste country programme of Conservation International. Conservation International's work in Timor-Leste began in 2009.

Its work in Timor-Leste includes creating a protected area network, supporting communities, sustainable tourism, and marine conservation.

Activities have included work linked to a national GEF-financed protected area network and priority catchment corridors, marine biodiversity surveys and marine protected area planning around Atauro Island and the Nino Konis Santana National Park area, and coastal ecosystem and resilience work on the north-west coast.

== Overview ==
Based in Dili, CI Timor-Leste works nationally with government and local communities on protected areas on land and at sea, natural resource management, and marine and coastal conservation.

Its current work is organised around four strands: creating a protected area network, supporting communities, sustainable tourism, and marine conservation.

== History ==
Conservation International's documented work in Timor-Leste begins in 2009. By that year, it was among the non-governmental partners involved in planning and management support for the proposed Nino Konis Santana Marine Park.

The Timor-Leste office was established in 2012 under invitation from then-President José Ramos-Horta. In August 2012, Conservation International carried out a rapid marine biological assessment of Timor-Leste's north coast, including sites inside and outside Nino Konis Santana National Park and on Atauro Island. One objective of the survey was to provide spatially detailed data and recommendations for development of the national park's management and zoning plan. In 2013, CI Timor-Leste published the assessment in the RAP Bulletin of Biological Assessment, and a companion marine-zoning recommendations report was issued for Nino Konis Santana National Park.

In May 2016, a GEF-financed project to secure the long-term conservation of Timor-Leste's biodiversity and ecosystem services through a functioning national protected area network and improved natural resource management in priority catchment corridors was approved. The project aimed to formally establish the national protected area network, strengthen management of two key catchment areas as pilot sites, and build the capacity of local communities to manage natural resources collaboratively. The executing agencies were the Ministry of Agriculture and Fisheries, the Ministry of Commerce, Industry and Environment, and CI Timor-Leste, with a GEF grant of US$3,340,367 and total cofinancing of US$14.1 million.

In 2020, national guidelines for interaction with cetaceans and dugongs were established in collaboration with Conservation International to support responsible whale- and dolphin-watching and a broader sustainable marine-tourism framework.

== Programmes and operations ==
Selected activities by location in Timor-Leste (1 Dili; 2 Nino Konis Santana National Park area (Lautém); 3 Atauro Island; 4 Liquiçá (north-west MPAs); 5 Bobonaro (north-west MPAs))

=== National protected area network and catchment corridors ===
Conservation International has served as an executing or implementing partner in the GEF-financed Timor-Leste Protected Area Network project, approved in 2016 to formally establish the national protected area network and strengthen management in two key catchment areas as pilot sites. The project was to be carried out with the Ministry of Agriculture and Fisheries and the Ministry of Commerce, Industry and Environment, with a GEF grant of US$3,340,367 and total cofinancing of US$14.1 million.

The project architecture combined national protected-area policy and management work with community-based natural resource management in priority catchment corridors. Planned outputs included a national protected area gap analysis, a protected area network strategy and legislation, participatory management plans for two priority protected areas, assessment of long-term financial needs and business plans for the network, and management plans for remaining Key Conservation Forests.

In the catchment corridors, the project was designed around natural resource management plans in 10 sucos, incorporation of natural resource management guidelines into suco regulations, establishment of conservation groups to oversee implementation, and livelihood activities linked to sustainable resource use. Capacity-building components included training for unemployed youth and adults, field exchanges, sustainable forest management in community forests, reforestation of at least 500 hectares of degraded land, and establishment of 10 community nurseries using native or endemic species where possible.

=== Nino Konis Santana National Park ===
CI Timor-Leste's work in Lautém has centred on the marine and coastal component of Nino Konis Santana National Park, the country's first national park. Early planning for the proposed marine park was framed as an integrated terrestrial and marine exercise, with recommendations that marine protected area planning should be coordinated with planning for the adjacent national park through a joint planning committee and a community-based consultation model.

The 2012 rapid marine assessment of Timor-Leste's north coast, including sites in and around Nino Konis Santana, was carried out to provide biodiversity data and practical recommendations for management and zoning. The resulting assessment and zoning report fed into later marine protected area planning and management guidance for the park. The survey recorded 741 coral reef fish species across 20 sites and documented the area's high natural and cultural values.

Management work there has also included efforts to improve community-government co-management across about 123,000 hectares of land and sea under a collaborative model recognised by legislative and traditional law.

=== Atauro Island ===
CI Timor-Leste's work on Atauro Island has combined marine biodiversity surveys, marine protected area planning, community co-management, and tourism-linked conservation. Surveys in 2012 and 2016 were used to support recommendations for marine protected area development, including multi-use zoning and no-take areas linked to fisheries recovery, livelihoods, and ecotourism development. They also documented exceptionally high reef-fish diversity, with a 2012 site total of 294 reef-fish species at Belio Barrier Reef and a 2016 survey adding 261 species not previously known from Atauro, bringing the Timor-Leste total to 894. Specimens collected during this work later supported the description of the Atauro dwarfgoby, Eviota atauroensis.

Since 2015, CI Timor-Leste has worked with communities on Atauro to establish community-managed marine protected areas. In 2019, these were brought together in Timor-Leste's first marine protected area network. By 2023, 12 marine protected areas had been established on Atauro through cooperation among the Ministry of Agriculture and Fisheries, Ataúro authorities, local communities, and Conservation International, including no-take zones and local fishing rules. The network was also linked to an access-fee agreement with dive operators, and by 2024 it was being used as part of a wider push to establish Atauro and its surrounding waters as a marine park.

=== Marine protected areas and coastal resilience ===
CI Timor-Leste's more recent marine operations have also included coastal resilience and new marine protected area initiatives on the north-west coast and in other proposed marine park areas. In 2023, it worked with the Ministry of Agriculture, Livestock, Fisheries and Forestry (MALFF) on a north-west marine protected area initiative covering the Bobonaro sites of Sanirin, Batugade, and Aidabaleten, and the Liquiçá site of Vatuvou village, with support from the Government of New Zealand through its embassy in Timor-Leste.

In 2024, Conservation International Timor-Leste and its Indonesian counterpart launched the Solutions for Marine and Coastal Resilience project to promote sustainable livelihoods through a co-management model and marine protected areas across both countries. The project was supported by the German Development Agency (GIZ) through the Coral Triangle Initiative and was reported as running to December 2026 with a budget of US$1 million. Activities included training for local communities on marine spatial plans and the Ocean Health Index.

In 2025, CI Timor-Leste announced plans to establish two further marine protected areas, one in Lautém and another in Liquiçá, with the longer-term aim of developing sustainable marine parks. The proposed areas were described as focusing on dugong habitat in Lautém and whale-sighting areas in Liquiçá. Studies were reported as underway, and the initiative was said to have support of about US$1.5 million from Margaret A. Cargill Philanthropies.

=== Sustainable tourism and cetaceans ===
CI Timor-Leste's sustainable-tourism work links marine protection to community-based nature tourism, including whale tourism, snorkelling, and diving, while trying to ensure that conservation areas can support both local subsistence needs and longer-term economic benefits.

This strand has included support for best-practice whale and dolphin watching. The national cetacean-interaction guidelines were intended to underpin a regulatory framework for responsible tourism, and training workshops were later held for marine tourism operators, fishers, and guides from Dili and Atauro Island on whale- and dolphin-watching methods and onboard education. This work connected marine protection to a nature-based development pathway centred on responsible wildlife tourism.

=== Communities and capacity building ===
CI Timor-Leste's community work emphasises co-management between government and local communities, environmental education, and practical natural resource management. It has included efforts to incorporate local practices such as Tara Bandu into conservation planning, peer learning through community cross-visits, practical learning on forest habitat loss, soil degradation, and water-quality decline, and use of community plant nurseries to support reforestation.

This capacity-building strand has also included formal training. In 2021, 100 Timorese were selected to participate in natural resource management and horticulture training at the National Center for Employment and Professional Training (CNEFP) in Tíbar. The training was promoted by Conservation International and the CNEFP in collaboration with government partners and was intended to strengthen practical knowledge, awareness of natural-resource management, and youth engagement in environmental stewardship.

Selected marine and coastal contexts of Conservation International Timor-Leste
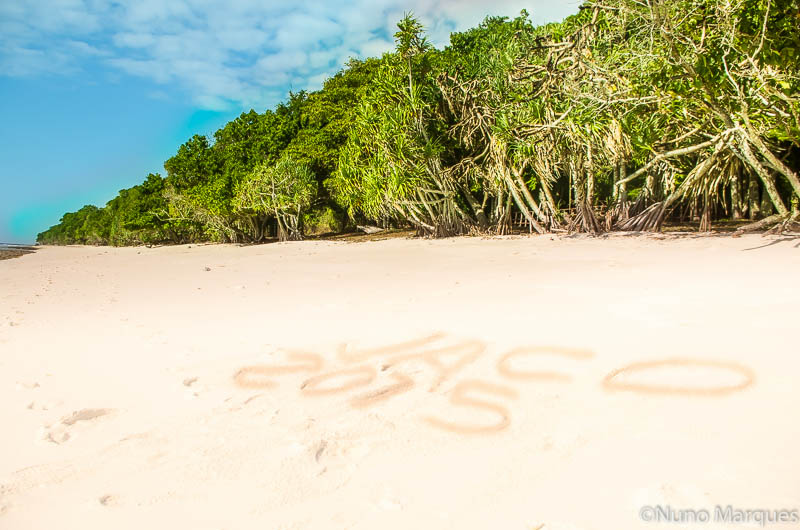
Jaco Island, within Nino Konis Santana National Park

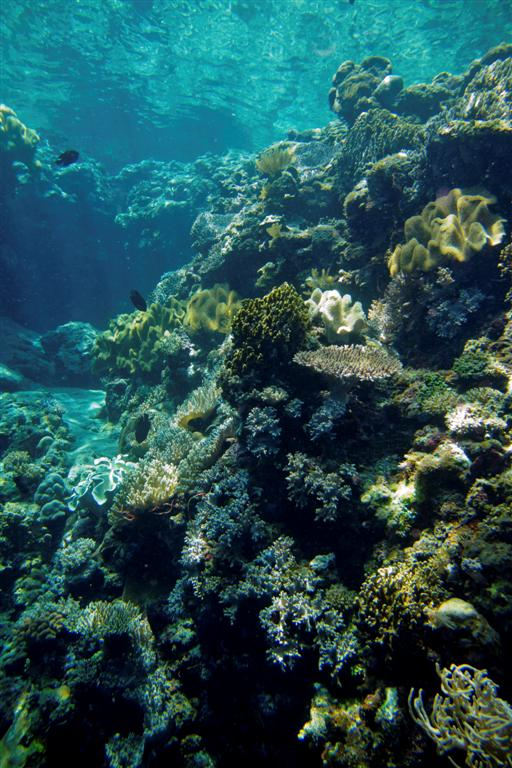
Shallow-water coral reef off Atauro Island

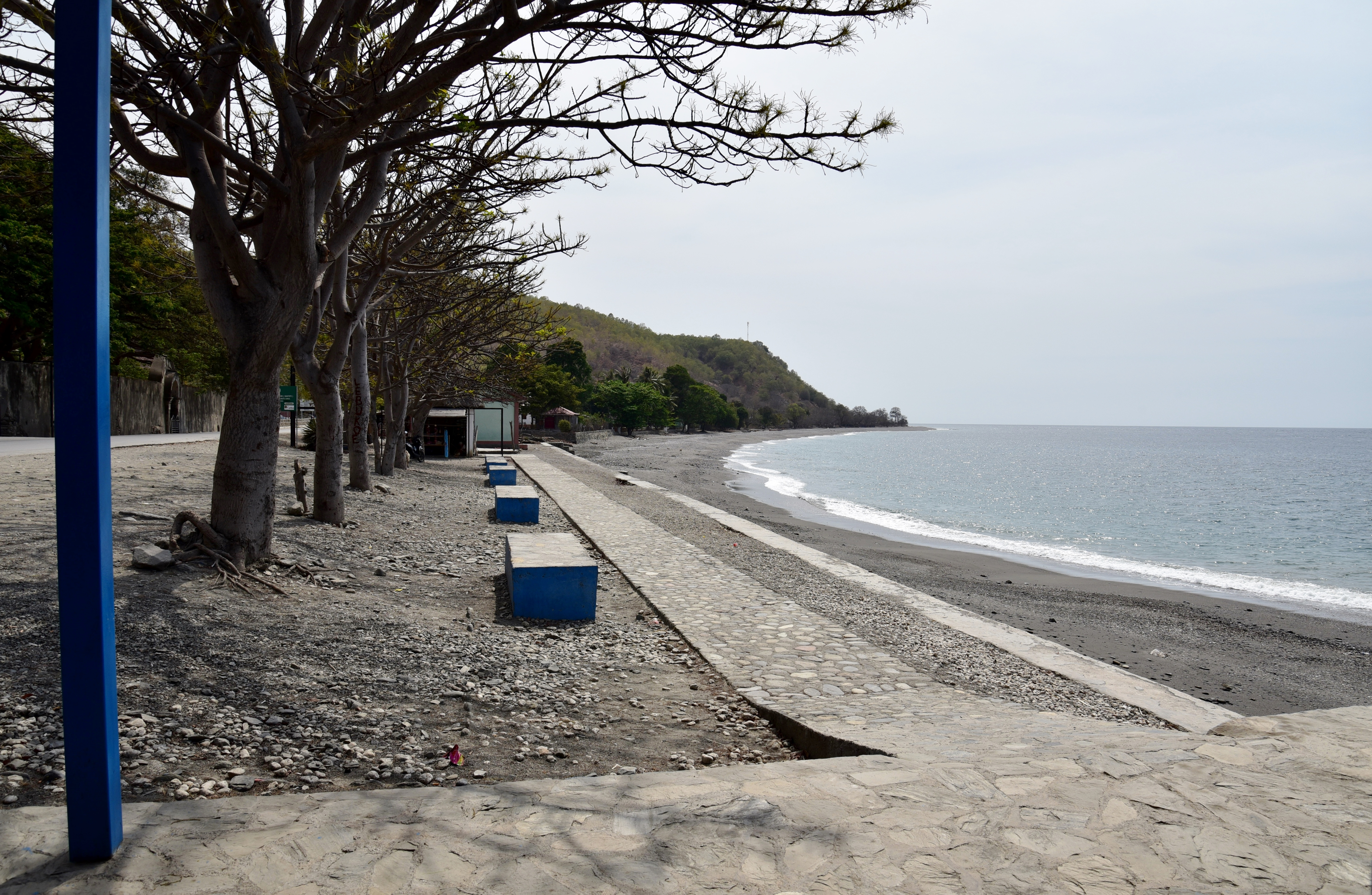
Beach at Maubara, Liquiçá Municipality, included in CI Timor-Leste's marine protected area planning in Bobonaro and Liquiçá

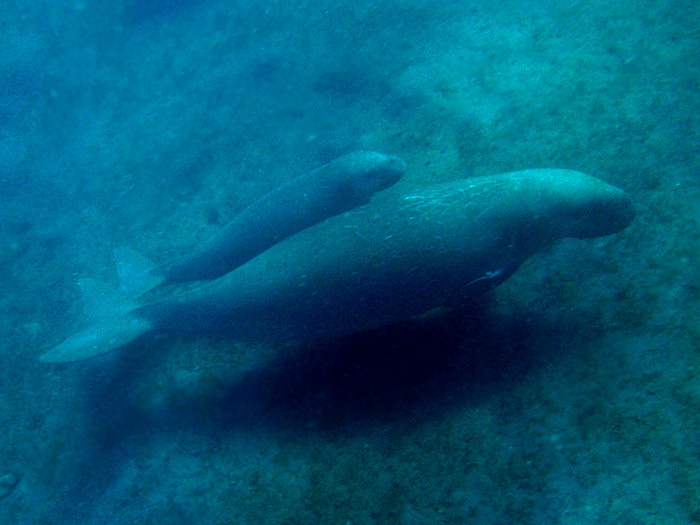
Dugong mother and calf from Timor-Leste waters

== Partnerships ==
Recurring government and institutional partners have included Timor-Leste ministries responsible for agriculture, fisheries, environment, industry, protected areas, and tourism in the national protected area network, marine zoning, marine protected area planning, and responsible whale- and dolphin-watching rules. International institutional partners have included the Global Environment Facility, the United Nations Environment Programme, and the Coral Triangle Initiative framework in protected area and marine-planning work.

On the community, civil-society, and donor side, Conservation International has worked with local communities in Nino Konis Santana and Atauro under co-management arrangements, including Tara Bandu and community-managed marine protected areas. Additional partners have included Konservasaun Flora no Fauna (KFF) and the Alola Foundation through the Kiwa RESTORE project, while donor and external support has included the Government of New Zealand, the Kiwa Initiative, the German Development Agency (GIZ), Margaret A. Cargill Philanthropies, and dive organisations involved in the Atauro access-fee arrangement.

== Funding and conservation finance ==
The main implemented conservation-finance architecture in CI Timor-Leste's work has been the GEF-backed Timor-Leste Protected Area Network project. Approved in 2016, the project combined US$3,340,367 in GEF financing with indicative cofinancing of US$14.1 million. The cofinancing plan included Conservation International, Timorese government agencies, local governments, the Centre for Biodiversity and Climate Change at the University of Timor-Leste, Permatil, development partners, and beneficiary cooperatives and local stakeholders.

A separate implemented donor-backed stream has supported marine protected areas and coastal resilience. The north-west marine protected area initiative in Bobonaro and Liquiçá was funded by the Government of New Zealand through its embassy in Timor-Leste. In 2024, the Solutions for Marine and Coastal Resilience project was launched with support from the German Development Agency (GIZ) through the Coral Triangle Initiative, with a reported budget of US$1 million and a timetable running to December 2026. The Kiwa RESTORE project has also funded coastal ecosystem restoration and livelihood work through local partnerships in Bobonaro and Liquiçá.

Implemented finance has also appeared at the local marine level. On Atauro Island, the marine protected area network was linked to a fee-for-access model with dive organisations, and the later agreement with operators was intended to generate income for communities from access to sites within the network.

Tourism-linked financing has so far been framed mainly through standards and industry development rather than through a stand-alone conservation fund. The 2020 cetacean-interaction guidelines and the associated responsible whale-tour-operator certification were intended to support a regulated whale- and dolphin-watching industry, linked to local employment and longer-term income from protected marine areas.

== Impact and evaluation ==
The protected-area-network project was later cited in GEF evaluative work as a strong example of integrating community-based sustainable forest management into village-level natural-resource-management plans. It was also presented as showing how nature-based approaches could be embedded in local governance and planning processes, laying groundwork for broader adoption in Timor-Leste.

Marine information and management in Timor-Leste remained constrained by poor coordination and a critical lack of data-sharing between development programmes, especially around Atauro Island and Nino Konis Santana. These weaknesses were linked to overlap in coral-reef surveys and habitat mapping and to lost opportunities for integrating marine data. A national marine protected areas strategy and plan, broader coordination among donors and programmes, and more standardised monitoring and data collection were identified as ways to improve planning, management, and complementary livelihood development.
