= Loure (disambiguation) =

The loure is a French Baroque dance. Loure may also refer to:

- Loure (bagpipe), a type of bagpipe native to Normandy, popular in the 17th and 18th centuries
- Louré (violin), a violin technique important among nineteenth-century virtuosi
- Edward Loure (fl. 2010s), Tanzanian tribal activist

== See also ==
- Lore (disambiguation)
- Lour., taxonomic author abbreviation of João de Loureiro (1717–1791), Portuguese Jesuit missionary and botanist
- Loures, city and a municipality in Portugal
- Loures, Heraklion, village in Greece
- Loures-Barousse, municipality in France
