= Lore (name) =

Lore is a name. Notable people with the name include:

== Given name ==
- Lore Agnes (1876–1953), German politician
- Lore Bader (1888–1973), American baseball pitcher
- Lore Berger (1921–1943), Swiss writer
- Lore Fischer (1911–1991), German alto and concert singer
- Lore Frisch (1925–1962), German actress
- Lore Lorentz (1920–1994), German cabaret artist and standup comedian
- Lore Noto (1923–2002), American theatre producer
- Lore Alford Rogers (1875–1975), American bacteriologist and dairy scientist
- Lore Segal (1928–2024), American novelist, translator, teacher, and author
- Lore Trittner (born 8 July 1933), Austrian swimmer

== Surname ==
- Charles B. Lore (1831–1911), American lawyer and politician from Delaware
- Marc Lore, American businessman and entrepreneur
- Nicholas Lore (born 1944), American social scientist
- William Lore (1909–2012), Lieutenant Commander in the Royal Canadian Navy
