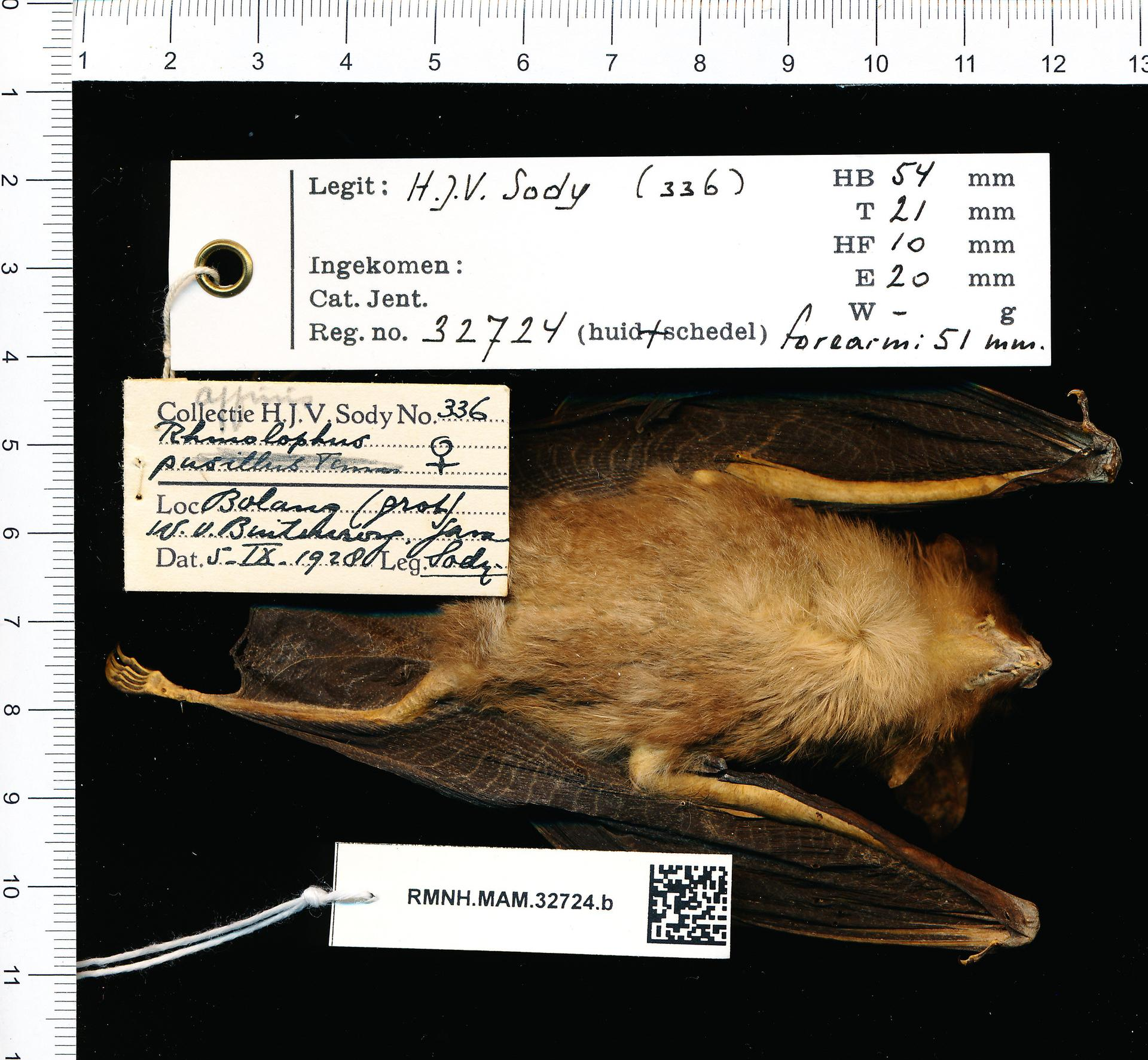

Conservation status
- Vulnerable (IUCN 3.1)

Scientific classification
- Kingdom: Animalia
- Phylum: Chordata
- Class: Mammalia
- Order: Chiroptera
- Family: Rhinolophidae
- Genus: Rhinolophus
- Species: R. canuti

Binomial name
- Rhinolophus canuti Thomas & Wroughton, 1909
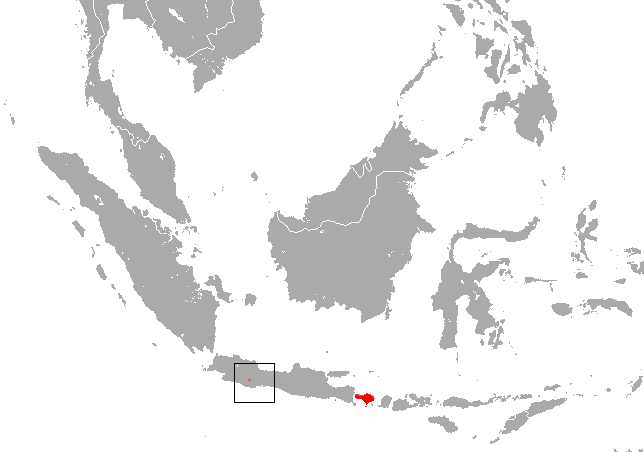
- Canut's horseshoe bat range

= Canut's horseshoe bat =

Species of bat

Canut's horseshoe bat (Rhinolophus canuti) is a species of bat in the family Rhinolophidae. It is endemic to Indonesia.

== Taxonomy and etymology ==
It was described as a new species in 1909 by Oldfield Thomas and Robert Charles Wroughton. They chose the species name "canuti" to honor Danish mammalogist Knud Andersen. "Canute" is an anglicization of the Danish name "Knud." Thomas and Wroughton chose to honor Andersen when naming the species "in recognition of the exhaustive work he has done on this complicated and difficult group."

== Description ==
Its skull has a rostral projection; the projection is on the top of the skull, with its leading edge aligned over the fourth premolar. Its head and body is 65 mm (2.6 in) long. Its tail is 22 mm (0.87 in); its ears are 24 mm (0.94 in). It has a very narrow connecting process between the sella and the posterior lancet.

== Biology ==
It is insectivorous. It is nocturnal, roosting in sheltered places during the day such as caves. These roosts likely consist of many individuals, as it is presumed to be a colonial species.

== Range and habitat ==
It is found on the Indonesian islands of Bali and Java.

== Conservation ==
It is currently evaluated as vulnerable by the IUCN. It is thought that its population size is decreasing.
