= Sumba roundleaf bat =

Conservation status
- Least Concern (IUCN 3.1)

Scientific classification
- Kingdom: Animalia
- Phylum: Chordata
- Class: Mammalia
- Order: Chiroptera
- Family: Hipposideridae
- Genus: Macronycteris
- Species: H. sumbae

Binomial name
- Hipposideros sumbae (Oei, 1960)
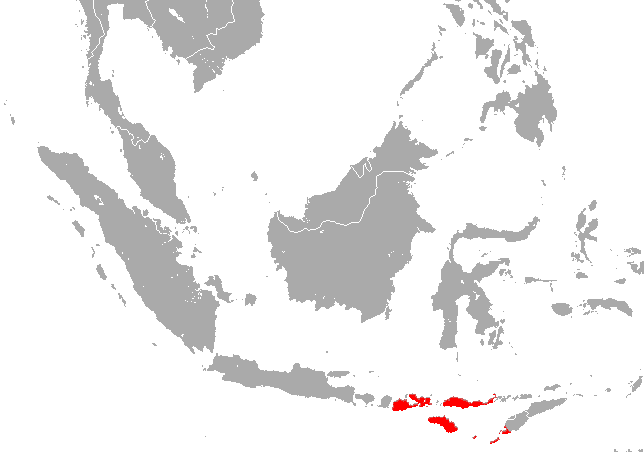
- Sumban leaf-nosed bat range

Species of bat

The Sumba roundleaf bat (Hipposideros sumbae) is a species of bat in the family Hipposideridae. It lives in Indonesia and East Timor. It is present on the islands of Sumba, Rote, Sumbawa, Flores, Semau, and Savu.

== Taxonomy and etymology ==
It was initially described as a subspecies of the intermediate roundleaf bat (Hipposideros larvatus) in 1960 by Oei Hong Peng. Its species name "sumbae" is derived from Sumba Island where the holotype was found. As the genus Hipposideros is speciose, it is divided into closely related species groups— the Sumba roundleaf bat is in the larvatus species group.

== Biology ==
It is nocturnal, roosting in sheltered places such as caves and houses during the day. It likely roosts in large colonies. It is insectivorous.

== Conservation ==
It is currently evaluated as least concern by the IUCN. It is locally common and it tolerates human modification of the landscape, as evinced by it roosting in houses sometimes. It may be declining due to the mining of limestone from its caves.
