= Lores (surname) =

Lores is a surname. Notable people with the surname include:

- Enrique Lores (born 1964/65), Spanish business executive
- Horacio Lores, Argentine politician
- Julio Lores (1908–1947), Peruvian-Mexican football player
- Marina Giral Lores (born 1990), Venezuelan tennis player
