= Nicholas Lore =

American social scientist

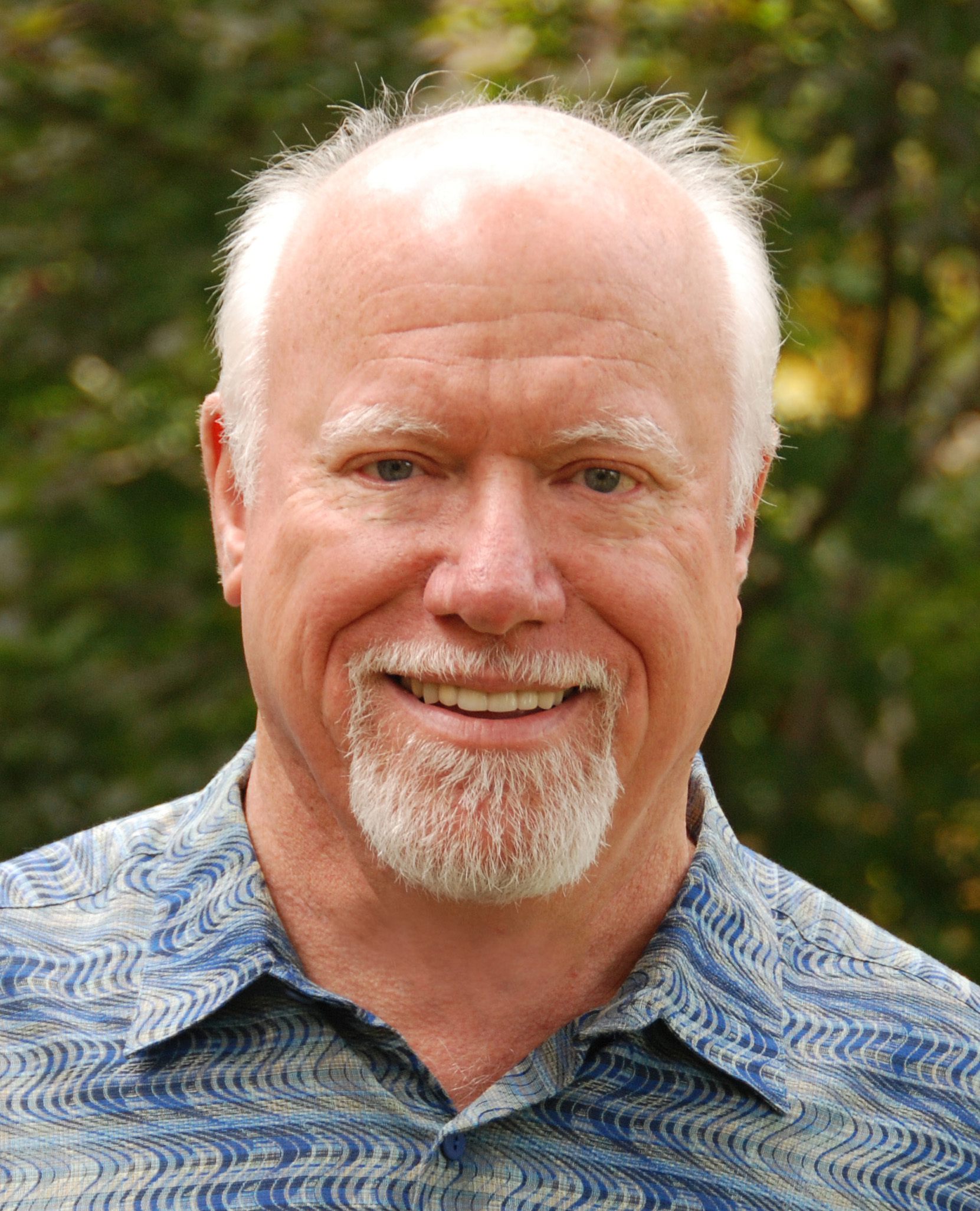
- Nicholas Lore in 2010
- Born: Nicholas Ayars Lore; July 12, 1944 (age 82); Oak Ridge, Tennessee, USA
- Occupations: Social scientist, author, consultant
- Website: www.rockportinstitute.com

Nicholas Ayars “Nick” Lore is a social scientist specializing in career design methodology and multiple intelligences, author, and the founder of the Rockport Institute.

== Career design methodology ==
His methodology includes a system of step-by-step inquiry during which people achieve certainty about their unique expression of those key elements. This methodology also includes a suite of tools and inquiries to deal with the doubts, fears and uncertainties that arise. A central concept of his work states that too many people concentrate their career goals on extrinsic rewards such as high salary and prestige and unnecessarily sacrifice intrinsic values such as job satisfaction. He asserts that a well-chosen career will provide both.

== Rockport Institute ==
Lore founded the Rockport Institute in 1981. The Rockport Institute performs testing on clients to identify personality traits, personal values and talents, from which customized career suggestions are then based upon. His Rockport career design methodology asserts that traditional prescriptive career counseling, in which a client takes a personality and interest test, and is then supplied with a list of suitable jobs leaves out many factors crucial to career success and fulfillment. His answer was to develop "career design coaching," later called simply "career coaching."

== Works ==
- Lore, Nicholas (2008). Now What?: The Young Person's Guide to Choosing the Perfect Career. Fireside. ISBN 978-0743266307.
- Lore, Nicholas (1998). The Pathfinder: How to Choose or Change Your Career for a Lifetime of Satisfaction and Success. Touchstone. ISBN 9781451608328.
- Lore, Nicholas (September 27, 2000). "Like a Movie Star." The Iranian.
