= Falintil =

East Timor pro-independence armed force

The Armed Forces for the National Liberation of East Timor (Portuguese: Forças Armadas da Libertação Nacional de Timor-Leste, Falintil) originally began as the military wing of the Fretilin party of East Timor. It was established on 20 August 1975 in response to Fretilin's political conflict with the Timorese Democratic Union (UDT).

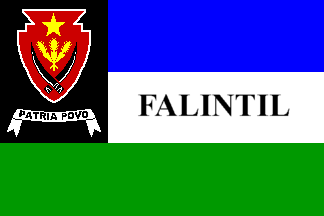
Flag of the FALINTIL

== Indonesian invasion ==
Falintil gained most of its initial military units when most of the former Portuguese garrison forces in the territory switched allegiance to it in August 1975 after the Portuguese withdrew following the 1974 Carnation Revolution.

At the time of the Indonesian invasion of East Timor in 1975, Falintil consisted of 2,500 regular troops, 7,000 with some Portuguese military training, and 10,000 who had attended short military instruction courses, for a total of 20,000.

The first commander of Falintil was Nicolau Lobato, who was killed during a battle with the Indonesian Armed Forces in 1978. Xanana Gusmão was elected as his replacement during a secret national conference in Lacluta, Viqueque in 1981. This meeting also saw the formation of the Revolutionary Council of National Resistance (Conselho Revolucinario de Resistência Nacional, CRRN), which was the first step in uniting the different resistance movement factions under one organisation.

== Resistance struggle ==
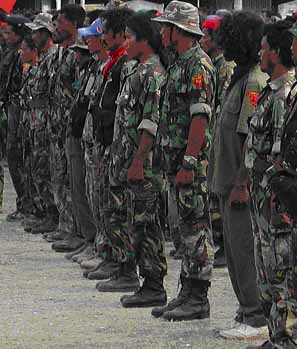
Falintil veterans in East Timor, 2005

Throughout the 1980s, Gusmão led both Falintil and the CRRN, gradually distancing himself from the Fretilin party. He began efforts to make Falintil non-partisan and transform it into the armed wing of a unified resistance movement. On 12 May 1983 Gusmão proclaimed the convergence of all nationalists in their struggle against Indonesian occupation, and by April 1984, Gusmão had proclaimed the ideological independence of Fretilin from the overall resistance movement and began to re-structure the armed resistance movement.

In the first week of August 1983, Falintil fighters attacked an Indonesian Army engineering unit, resulting in the deaths of 16 soldiers. On 31 August 1983, the Indonesian Army began military operations around Viqueque, about 100 kilometres (62 mi) from Dili. A spokesman for the Indonesian Embassy in Canberra said about 3,200 troops in four battalions, including special forces, were deployed with tanks and troop transport aircraft.

On 5 May 1985 Gusmão sent the Fretilin central committee, operating in exile, a message informing them of the structure of the CRRN and assuming the title of Commander-in-Chief of Falintil. A significant step in the unification of the resistance movement occurred in March 1986 when Fretilin and UDT agreed to establish the "nationalist convergence". Meanwhile, the Falintil guerrilla force continued to launch attacks against Indonesian soldiers. In June 1986, diplomats in Jakarta acknowledged losing between 20 and 35 soldiers in a Falintil ambush.

On 20 June 1988, the National Resistance of East Timorese Students (Resistência Nacional dos Estudantes de Timor-Leste, RENETIL) was created in Indonesia, reporting directly to Falintil and Gusmão. On 31 December 1988, Gusmão officially announced that Falintil was now the non-partisan armed resistance wing of the unified resistance movement, which was to be known as the National Council of Maubere Resistance (Conselho Nacional da Resistência Maubere, CNRM).

Between 23 and 28 May 1990, the CNRM held an extraordinary meeting to restructure the resistance movement. During the conference Gusmão officially resigned from Fretilin while remaining Commander-in-Chief of Falintil and President of the CNRM. This meeting also saw the formation of the Clandestine Front (Frente Clandestina), which came about from the recognition that Falintil, the armed resistance, had been significantly weakened by many years of guerrilla activity against the Indonesian military. The formation of the Clandestine Front was part of a strategy to organize the population against the occupying forces. These events led to an upsurge in activity against the resistance movement by the occupiers, which led many resistance leaders to flee to the mountains or overseas and led to the arrest of Gusmão on 20 November 1992. Ma'Huno Bulerek Karathayano, a member of Fretilin's central committee, became the leader of the resistance only to be arrested himself on 5 April 1993. Nino Konis Santana replaced Karathayano as leader on 25 April 1993, and by September, all factions of the resistance had accepted Santana as the movement's leader. Taur Matan Ruak was appointed Commander of Falintil. Under Santana's leadership, the restructuring started by Gusmão was further reinforced under the CNRM umbrella with Santana as leader of the Executive Council of the "Struggle", Ruak in charge of Falintil, and Keri Laran Sabalae (i.e. Pedro Nunes) taking charge of the Clandestine Front.

Throughout the 1990s, the occupying Indonesian forces stepped up their actions against the resistance, and factional troubles between Fretilin and other resistance organizations plagued the CNRM, with Fretilin members signing a document against the leadership of Santana. Sabalae was captured near Gleno by Indonesia on 1 June 1995. Gusmão remained the leader of the CNRM and Commander-in-Chief of Falintil despite being incarcerated in an Indonesian prison. On 31 May 1997, the East Timorese guerrillas killed 16 policemen and 1 soldier in an ambush near Quelicai, southeast of Baucau. In 1998, Santana died in an accident, and the Falintil commander, Ruak, was elected as leader of the "Struggle", while also remaining operational commander of Falintil. In April 1998 during the National Convention of East Timorese Living Abroad being held in Portugal, the National Council of Timorese Resistance (Conselho Nacional da Resistência Timorense, CNRT) was formed, replacing the CNRM and reinforcing the previous attempts to unify all the factions of the resistance struggle against Indonesia.

== Towards independence ==
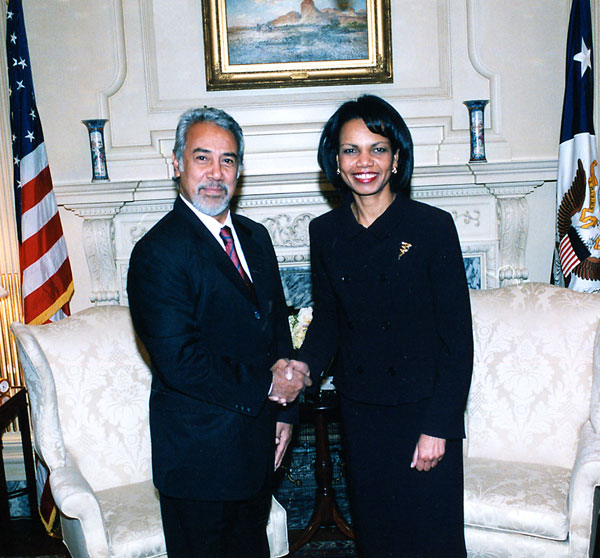
Former resistance fighter and Prime Minister of East Timor Xanana Gusmão in 2006 with Condoleezza Rice

Changes in the Indonesian government, together with growing international pressure, resulted in the President of Indonesia, B. J. Habibie, announcing a referendum for the East Timorese people to vote on autonomy. The Indonesians also announced that if autonomy were rejected, it would open the door for independence. The Indonesian military provided arms to pro-Indonesia militias to coerce the population to vote in favour of autonomy. On 10 August 1999, Gusmão ordered Falintil to remain in their cantonments, resist all provocations of the Indonesian military and the armed militias, and not get involved in the civil unrest orchestrated by the Indonesian military. These orders were generally complied with by Falintil, with the fighters remaining in their secret camps during the referendum process. On 30 August, the referendum took place with a 98% turnout of registered voters. By 4 September, the United Nations announced that 78.5% had voted against autonomy, therefore beginning the independence process. The following day the Indonesian military and pro-Indonesia militias, in response to the referendum result, started a massive campaign of looting and violence against the East Timorese people. Gusmão and the CNRT leadership maintained that Falintil needed to resist the urge to join the fight and remain in their cantonments. On 20 September, the Australian Army-led, UN-sanctioned International Force East Timor (INTERFET) landed in East Timor to counter the activities of the armed militias and attempt to restore peace. One of INTERFET's mandates was to disarm all the factions in the country, including Falintil. Under advice from the recently released Gusmão, INTERFET and the UN allowed Falintil to remain armed but required them to stay in their cantonments until peace was restored, at which time they would hand over their arms.

== East Timorese Defence Force ==
On 1 February 2001 Falintil was officially dissolved, only to be almost immediately resurrected as the official armed force of the newly independent country, the East Timorese Defence Force (Falintil–Forças de Defesa de Timor Leste, F-FDTL), with the duty under the Constitution of East Timor to "guarantee the independence of the nation, its territorial integrity, and the freedom and safety of the population against aggression, which does not respect the constitutional order." Ruak became the first Commander of the F-FDTL and assumed the rank of brigadier general.

Falintil veterans make up a significant portion of the membership of the "politico-criminal" armed groups operating in East Timor, such as Sagrada Familia, CPD-RDTL, and Colimau 2000.

== See also ==
- Indonesian occupation of East Timor
- Portuguese Colonial War
