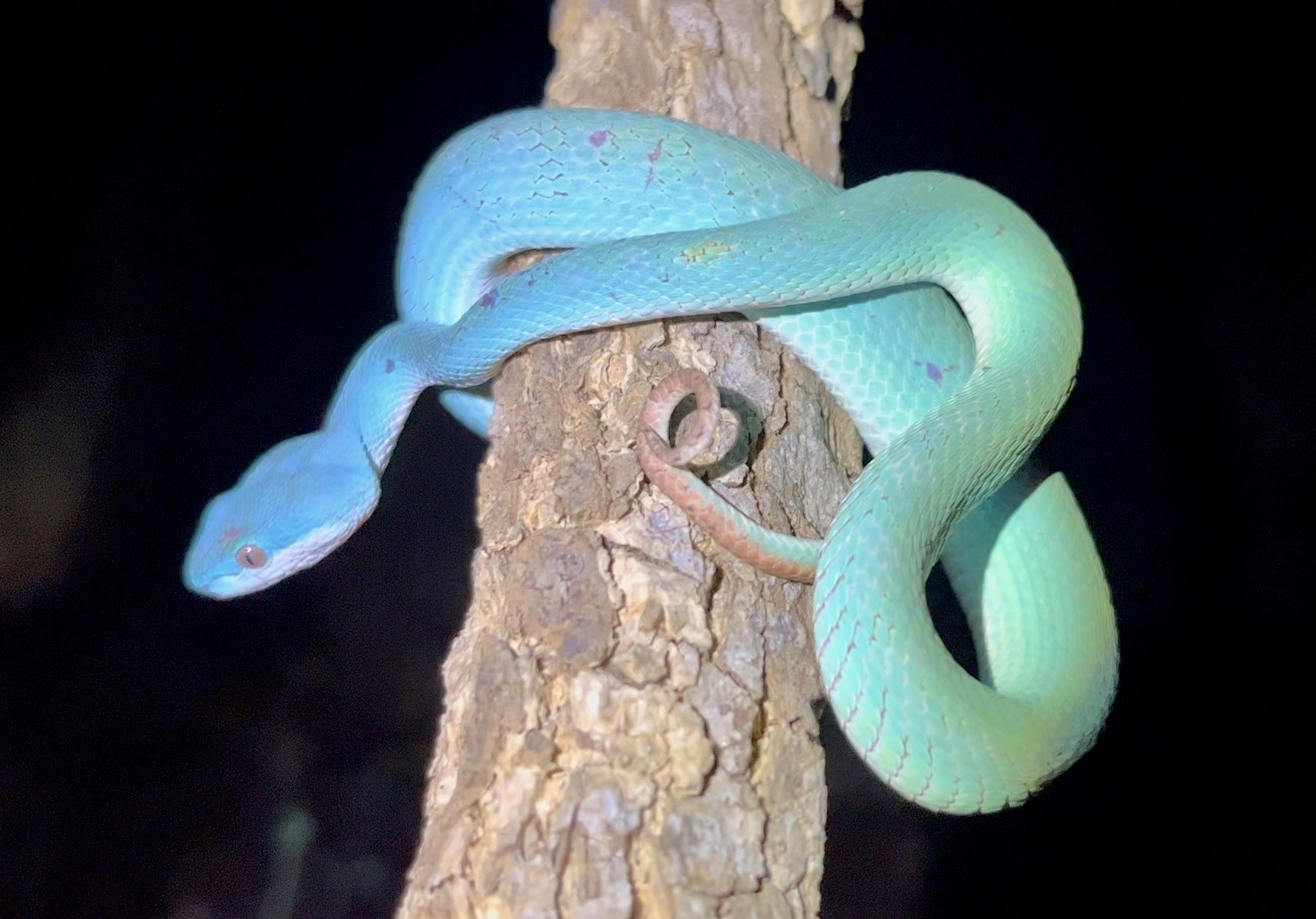

Conservation status
- Least Concern (IUCN 3.1)

Scientific classification
- Kingdom: Animalia
- Phylum: Chordata
- Class: Reptilia
- Order: Squamata
- Suborder: Serpentes
- Family: Viperidae
- Genus: Trimeresurus
- Species: T. insularis

Binomial name
- Trimeresurus insularis Kramer, 1977

Synonyms
- Trimeresurus albolabris insularis Kramer, 1977; Cryptelytrops insularis – Malhotra & Thorpe, 2004; Trimeresurus (Trimeresurus) insularis – David et al., 2011

= Trimeresurus insularis =

Species of snake

Trimeresurus insularis, commonly known as the Indonesian pit viper, Lesser Sunda Islands pit viper, Komodo Island pit viper, Sunda white-lipped pit viper or red-tailed pit viper, also popularly known as blue pit viper, blue viper or blue insularis, is a species of venomous pit viper found in eastern Java and the Lesser Sunda Islands.

== Description ==
The scalation includes 21 rows of dorsal scales at midbody, 156–164/156–167 ventral scales in males/females, 70–75/54–59 subcaudal scales in males/females, and 7–12 supralabial scales. Their color patterns are often found to be green or blue-green, with specific populations even containing yellow variants as well.

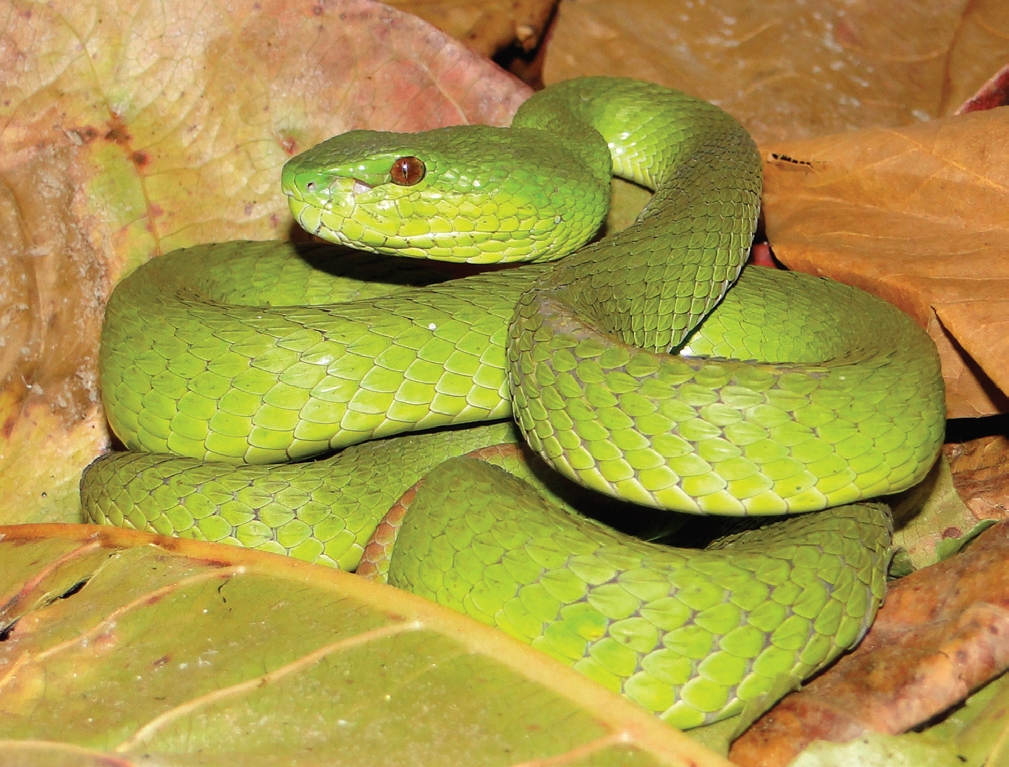
green color variant of Lesser Sunda Islands pit viper on Padar island, Indonesia

== Geographic range ==
It is found in Indonesia on eastern Java, Adonara, Alor, Bali, Flores, Komodo, Lombok, Padar, Rinca, Romang, Rote, Sumba, Sumbawa, Timor and Wetar. They are also found in neighboring Timor-Leste. The type locality given is "Soe, Timor". They are arboreal and can be found in dry monsoon forests at elevations up to 1,200 m (3,900 ft) above sea level.
