= Loré Administrative Post =

Administrative post in Lautém Municipality, East Timor

Loré
- Administrative Post
- Posto Administrativo de Loré (Portuguese); Postu administrativu Loré (Tetum)
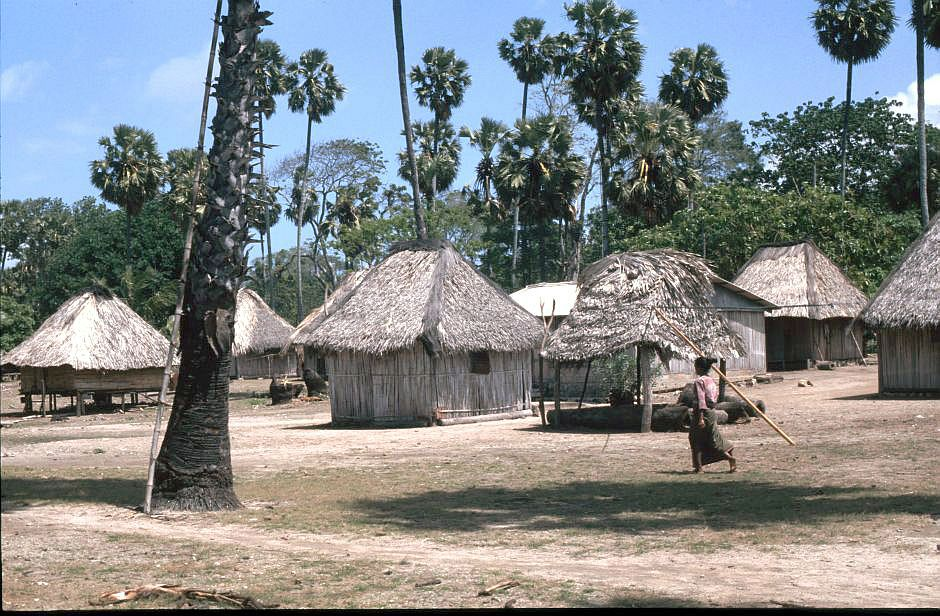
- Loré village

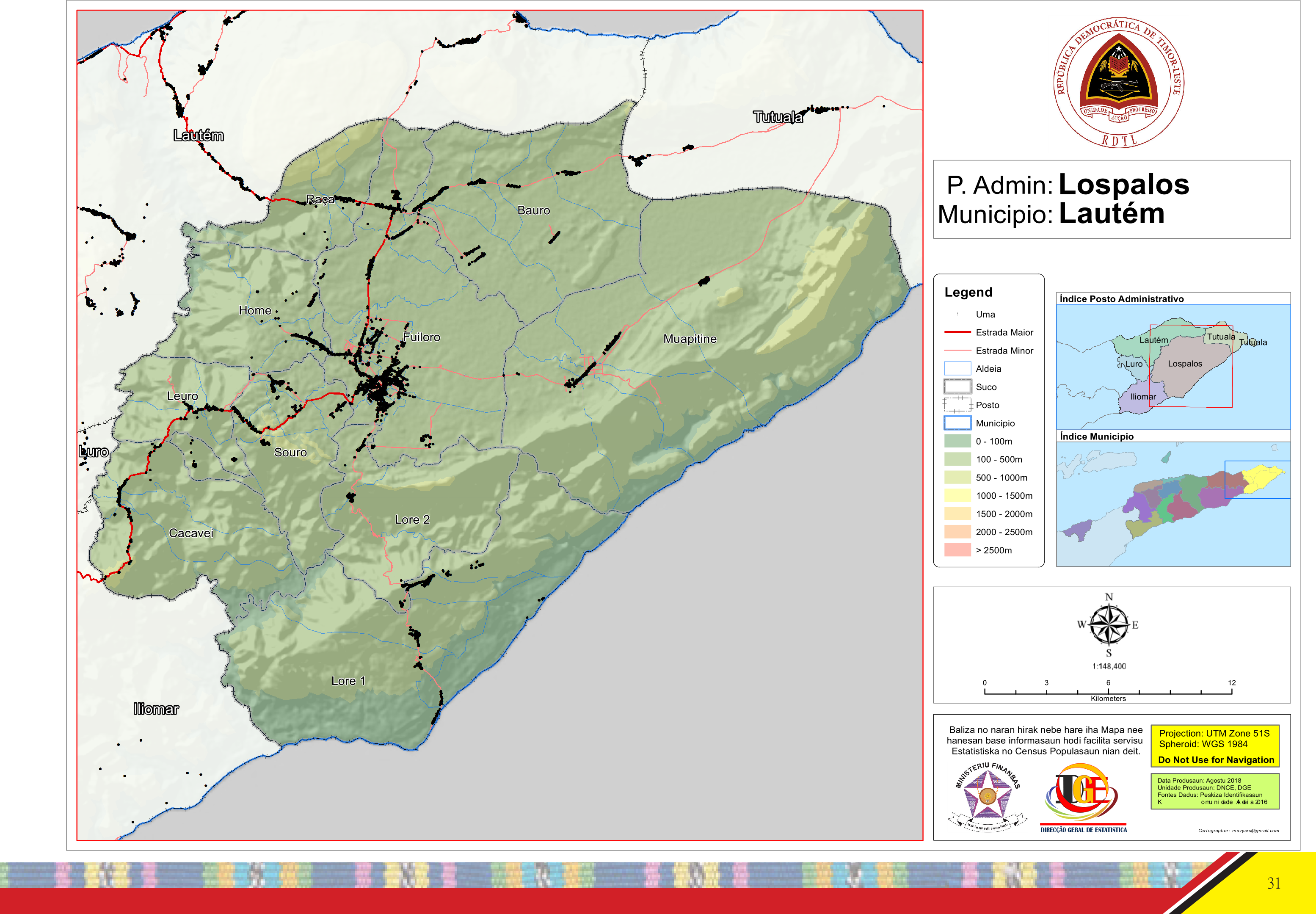
- Official map of the Lospalos Administrative Post (2015–2021), from which Loré was separated

- Location within East Timor
- Coordinates: 8°39′S 127°1′E
- Country: East Timor
- Municipality: Lautém
- Established: 1 January 2022
- Seat: Loré
- Sucos: Lore 1; Lore 2

Area
  - Total: 179.79 km^{2} (69.42 sq mi)

Population (2022)
  - Total: 3,692
  - Density: 20.54/km^{2} (53.19/sq mi)
- Time zone: UTC+09:00 (TLT)

Loré, officially Loré Administrative Post (Portuguese: Posto Administrativo de Loré, Tetum: Postu administrativu Loré), is an administrative post in Lautém municipality, East Timor. It was separated from Lospalos Administrative Post with effect from 1 January 2022.
