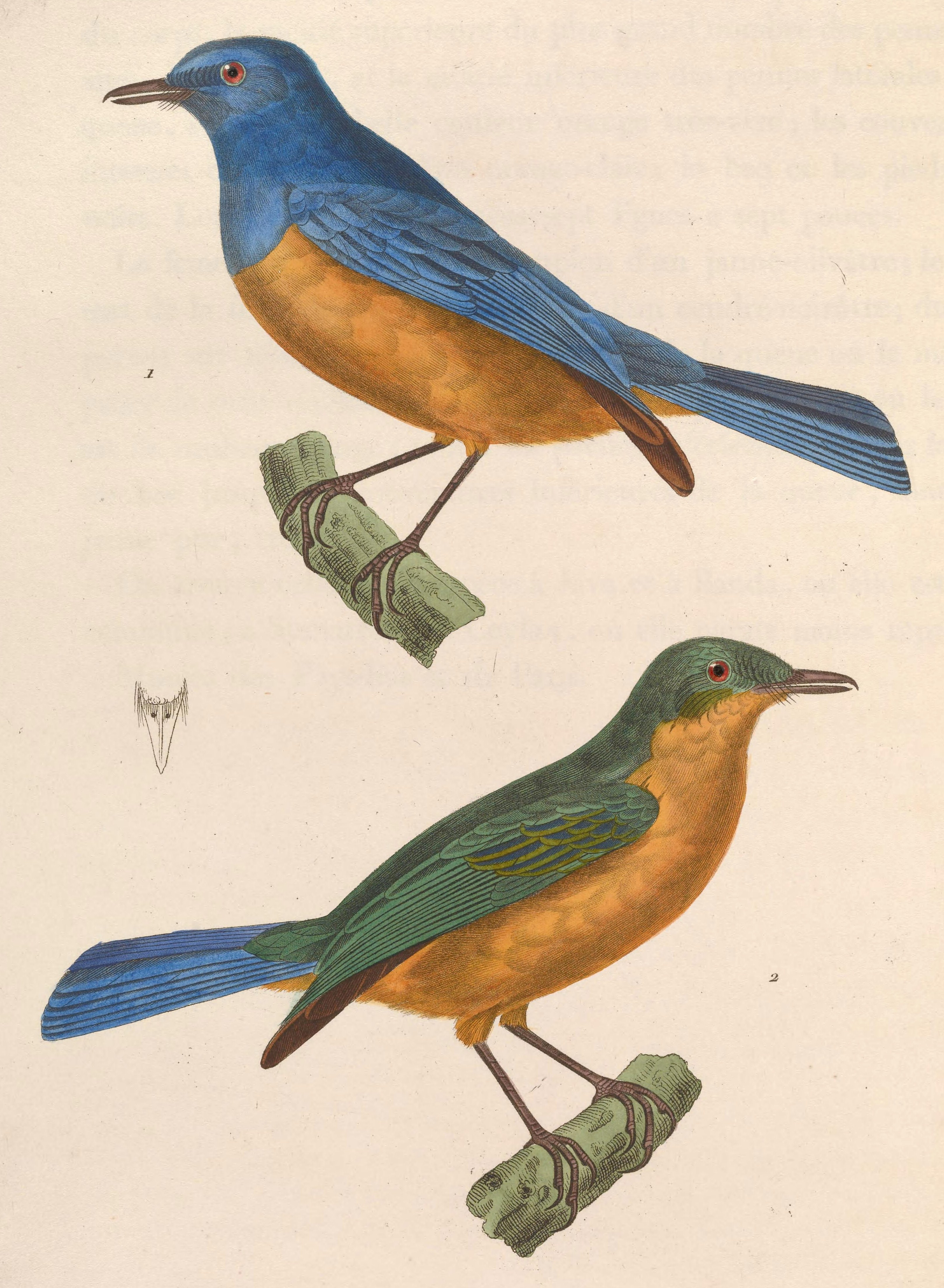

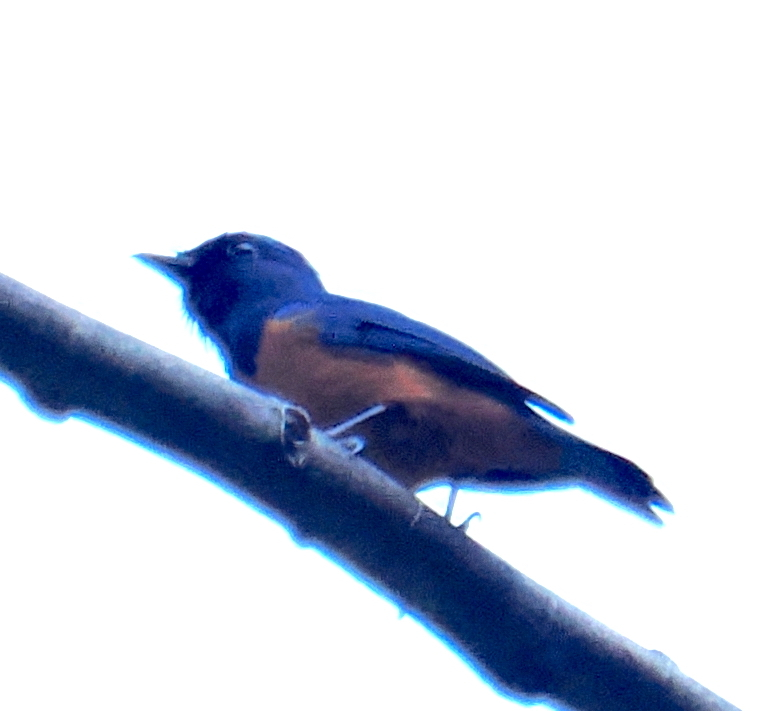

Conservation status
- Least Concern (IUCN 3.1)

Scientific classification
- Kingdom: Animalia
- Phylum: Chordata
- Class: Aves
- Order: Passeriformes
- Family: Muscicapidae
- Genus: Eumyias
- Species: E. hyacinthinus

Binomial name
- Eumyias hyacinthinus (Temminck, 1820)

= Timor blue flycatcher =

Species of bird

The Timor blue flycatcher (Eumyias hyacinthinus) is a species of bird in the family Muscicapidae. It is found on Timor island. Its natural habitats are subtropical or tropical moist lowland forests and subtropical or tropical moist montane forests.
