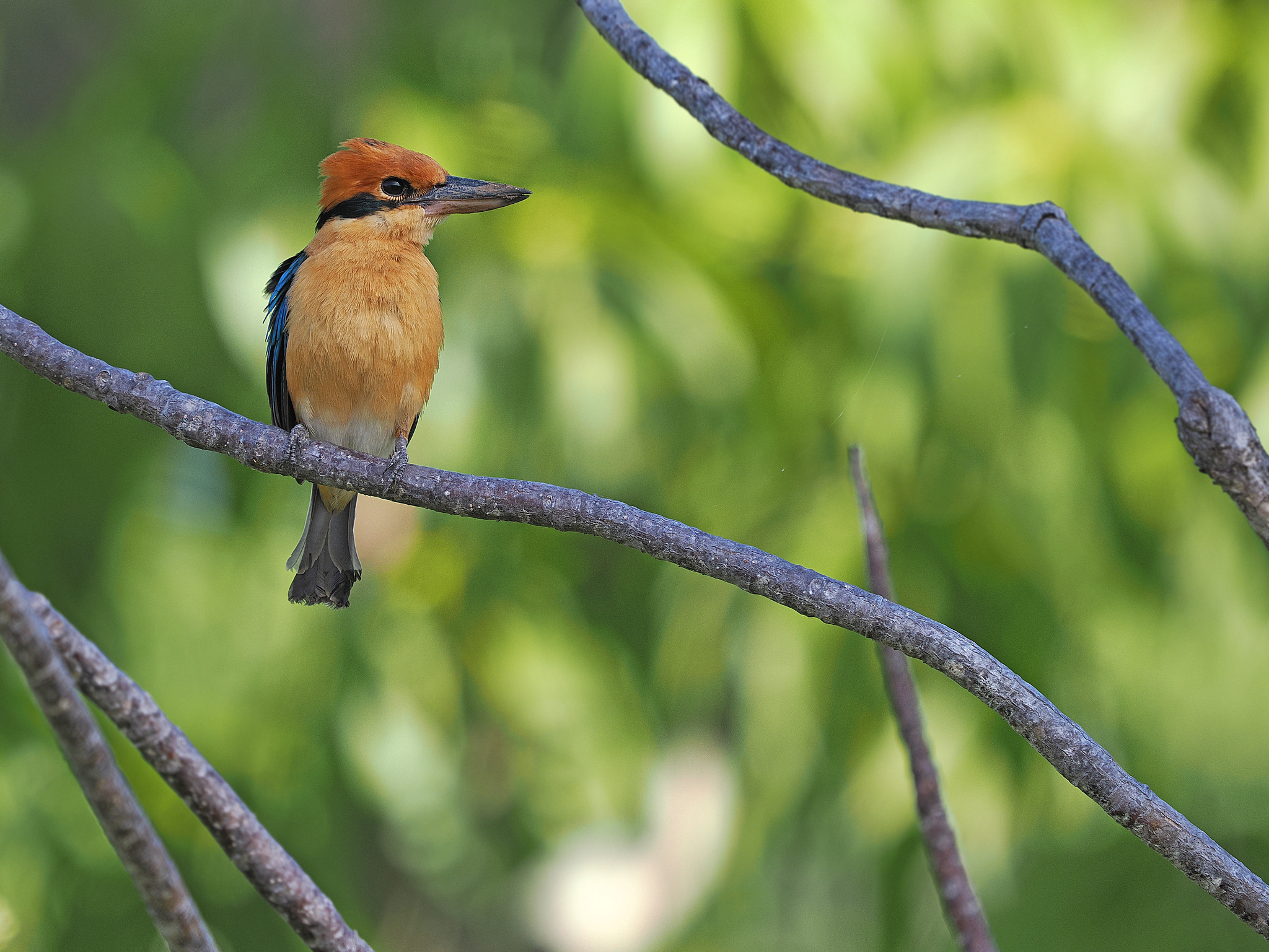

Conservation status
- Least Concern (IUCN 3.1)

Scientific classification
- Kingdom: Animalia
- Phylum: Chordata
- Class: Aves
- Order: Coraciiformes
- Family: Alcedinidae
- Subfamily: Halcyoninae
- Genus: Todiramphus
- Species: T. australasia

Binomial name
- Todiramphus australasia (Vieillot, 1818)

Subspecies
- T. a. australasia - (Vieillot, 1818); T. a. dammerianus - (Hartert, 1900); T. a. odites - (Peters, JL, 1945)

Synonyms
- Todirhamphus australasia (Vieillot, 1818) [orth. error]

= Cinnamon-banded kingfisher =

Species of bird

The cinnamon-banded kingfisher (Todiramphus australasia) is a species of bird in the family Alcedinidae. It is found in Indonesia and East Timor. It is endemic to the Lesser Sundas. Its natural habitat is subtropical or tropical dry forests. It is threatened by habitat loss.
