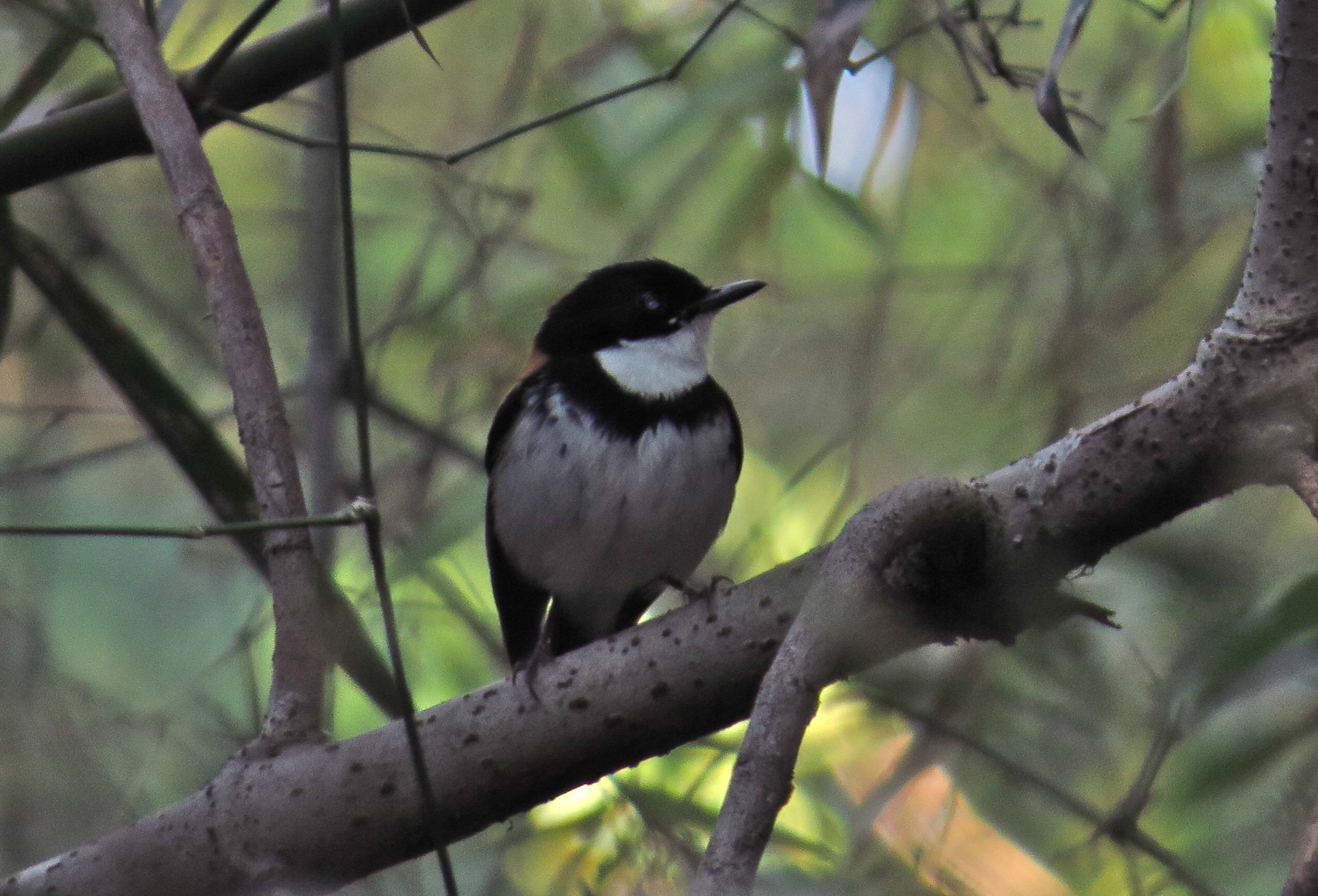
- In West Timor, Indonesia

Conservation status
- Least Concern (IUCN 3.1)

Scientific classification
- Kingdom: Animalia
- Phylum: Chordata
- Class: Aves
- Order: Passeriformes
- Family: Muscicapidae
- Genus: Ficedula
- Species: F. timorensis

Binomial name
- Ficedula timorensis (Hellmayr, 1919)

= Black-banded flycatcher =

Species of bird

The black-banded flycatcher (Ficedula timorensis), also known as the Timor flycatcher, is a species of bird in the family Muscicapidae. In the past the species was considered to be related to the Australasian robins but this was as the result of convergent evolution. It is endemic to Timor island. The black-banded flycatcher is small with a broad bill and distinctive plumage. The species has a white belly, lower rump and throat with a thin black band across the chest. The tail, neck and wings are black and the back, upper wing and shoulders rich chestnut. The plumage of the head is sexually dichromatic, with the head being black in the males and dark grey in the females. The eye and bill is black and the feet and legs are yellow. The calls consist of soft whistles, some of which sound similar to the Timor stubtail.

The black-banded flycatcher is an uncommon species that is difficult to see and very little is known about its biology. The natural habitat of the species is lowland monsoon forests and hill forests up to 1200 m. Nothing is known about its breeding behaviour, the only observations of this are adults feeding recently fledged chicks in December. It feeds singly or in pairs on invertebrates, taking its prey mostly by gleaning with a few sallying flights to snatch aerial prey. The species is currently listed as near threatened. It is threatened by habitat loss.
