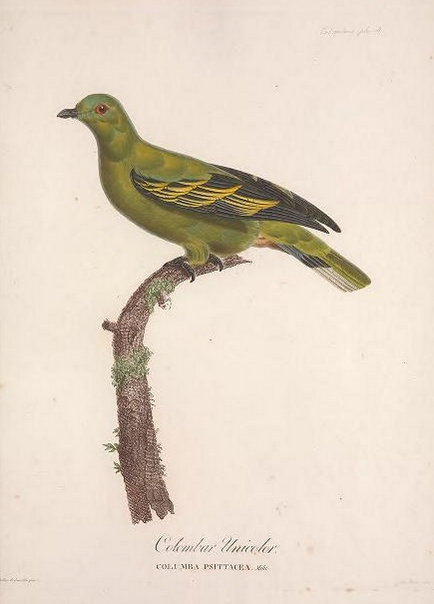

Conservation status
- Endangered (IUCN 3.1)

Scientific classification
- Kingdom: Animalia
- Phylum: Chordata
- Class: Aves
- Order: Columbiformes
- Family: Columbidae
- Genus: Treron
- Species: T. psittaceus

Binomial name
- Treron psittaceus (Temminck, 1808)

Synonyms
- Columba psittacea Temminck, CJ, 1808; Treron pompadora psittacea Temminck, CJ, 1808; Treron psittacea (Temminck, 1808)

= Timor green pigeon =

Species of bird

The Timor green pigeon (Treron psittaceus) is a species of bird in the family Columbidae. It is found on the islands of Rote and Timor. Its natural habitat is subtropical or tropical moist lowland forests. It is threatened by habitat loss.

== Taxonomy ==
In the past, the Timor green pigeon has been considered a subspecies of the thick-billed and pompadour green pigeon complexes, to which it is closely related.

== Description ==
The Timor green pigeon reaches an average length of 31–33 cm (12–13 in). It has largely grey-washed green upperparts, with greyish-black wing feathers marked by the yellow margins of the coverts and outer secondaries. The underparts are mostly green, brighter and less grey than on the upperparts. The vent is white and green, while the tail feathers are yellow-green. The tail is marked by a dark grey stripe medially. The beak is a pale blue towards the base and horn-coloured at the tip. The eye is ringed by bare light bluish-green skin. Females have more washed out green plumage and lighter yellow edges to the wing feathers.

== Distribution and habitat ==
The Timor green pigeon is found on the islands of Rote, Timor, Semau, and Atauro in the Lesser Sunda Islands. It inhabits primary forest, monsoon forest, and secondary forest with tall trees in lowlands, occurring up to altitudes of 160 m (520 ft).

== Behaviour and ecology ==
The Timor green pigeon is frugivorous and has been recorded feeding on figs.
