= Outline of Timor-Leste =

Island country in Southeast Asia

The Flag of Timor-Leste

The Coat of arms of Timor-Leste

The location of Timor-Leste

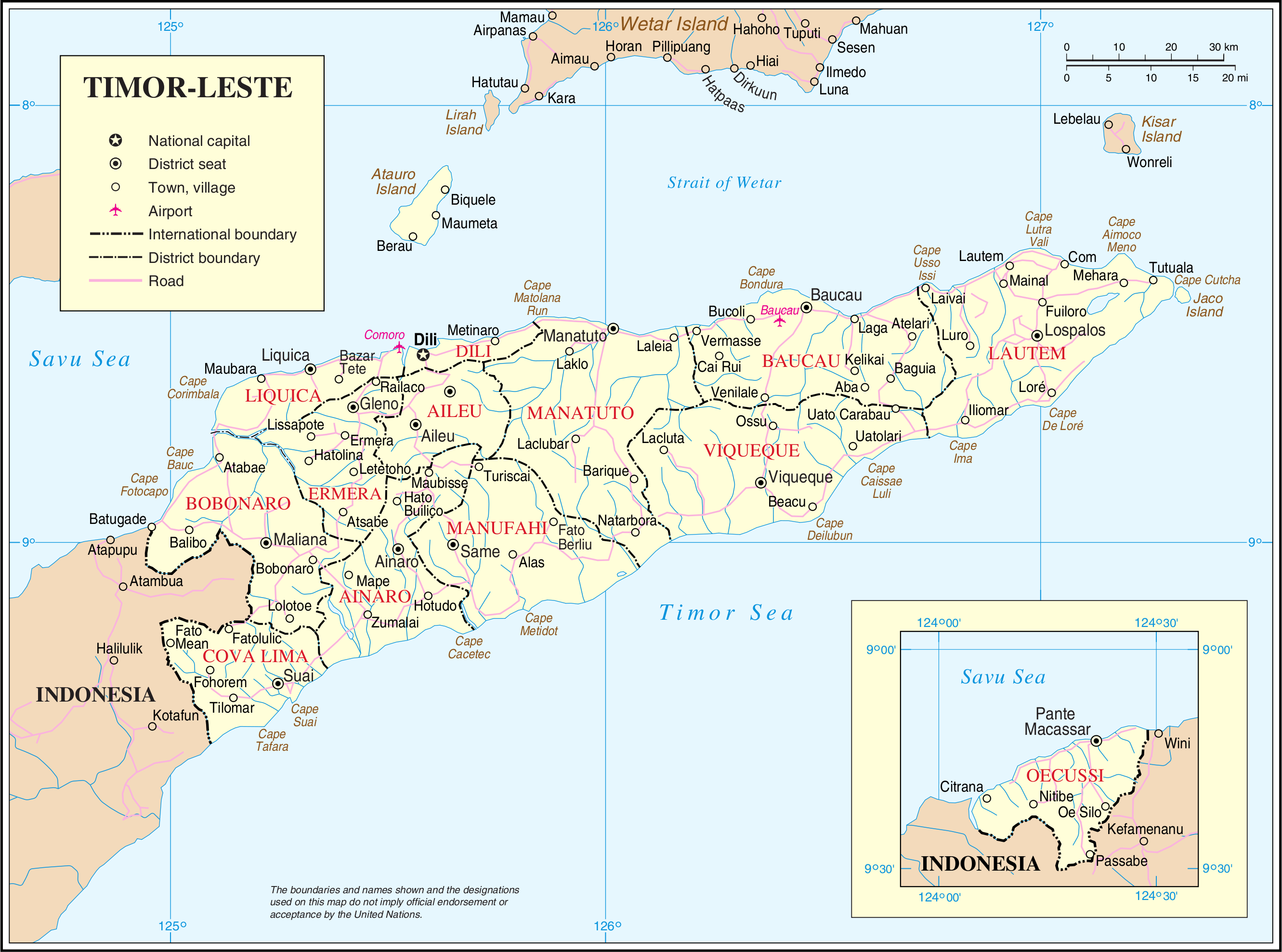
An enlargeable map of Timor-Leste

The following outline is provided as an overview of and topical guide to Timor-Leste:

Timor-Leste (formerly East Timor) – sovereign island nation located in Southeast Asia. Timor-Leste comprises the eastern half of the Island of Timor, the nearby islands of Atauro and Jaco, and Oecussi-Ambeno, an exclave on the northwestern side of the island, within Indonesian West Timor. The small country of 15,410 km^{2} (5,400 sq mi) is located about 640 km (400 mi) northwest of Darwin, Australia.

Timor-Leste was colonized by Portugal in the 16th century, and was known as Portuguese Timor until Portugal's decolonization of the country. In late 1975 East Timor declared its independence but was invaded and occupied by Indonesia later that year, and declared that country's 27th province the following year. In 1999, following the United Nations-sponsored act of self-determination, Indonesia relinquished control of the territory and Timor-Leste became the first new sovereign state of the twenty-first century on May 20, 2002. Timor-Leste is one of only two predominantly Roman Catholic countries in Southeast Asia, the other being the Philippines.

At US$2,500, the per capita GDP (purchasing power parity adjusted) of Timor-Leste is one of the lowest in the world. Its Human Development Index (HDI), however, corresponds to a medium degree of human development and places Timor-Leste 142nd among the world's states.

== General reference ==
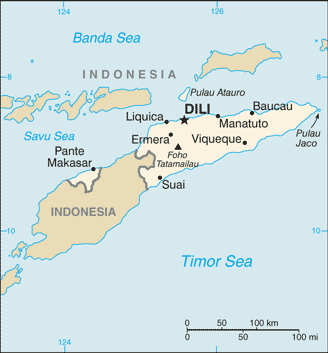
An enlargeable basic map of Timor-Leste

- Pronunciation: /ˌiːst ˈtiːmɔːr/
- Common English country names: Timor-Leste or East Timor
- Official English country name: The Democratic Republic of Timor-Leste
- Common endonym(s):
  - Repúblika Demokrátika Timór-Leste (Tetun Dili)
  - República Democrática de Timor-Leste (Portuguese)
- Official endonym(s):
- Adjectival(s): Timorese
- Demonym(s):
- Etymology: Name of Timor-Leste
- ISO country codes: TL, TLS, 626
- ISO region codes: See ISO 3166-2:TL
- Internet country code top-level domain: .tl

== Geography of Timor-Leste ==
Geography of Timor-Leste

- Timor-Leste is: a country
- Location:
  - Southern Hemisphere and Eastern Hemisphere
  - Eurasia (though not on the mainland)
    - Asia
      - Southeast Asia
        - Maritime Southeast Asia
          - Island of Timor (the eastern half)
  - Time zone: UTC+09
  - Extreme points of Timor-Leste
    - High: Mount Ramelau 2,963 m (9,721 ft)
    - Low: Timor Sea 0 m
  - Land boundaries: Indonesia 228 km
  - Coastline: 706 km
- Population of Timor-Leste: 1,155,000 - 152nd most populous country
- Area of Timor-Leste: 14,874 km^{2}
- Atlas of Timor-Leste

=== Environment of Timor-Leste ===
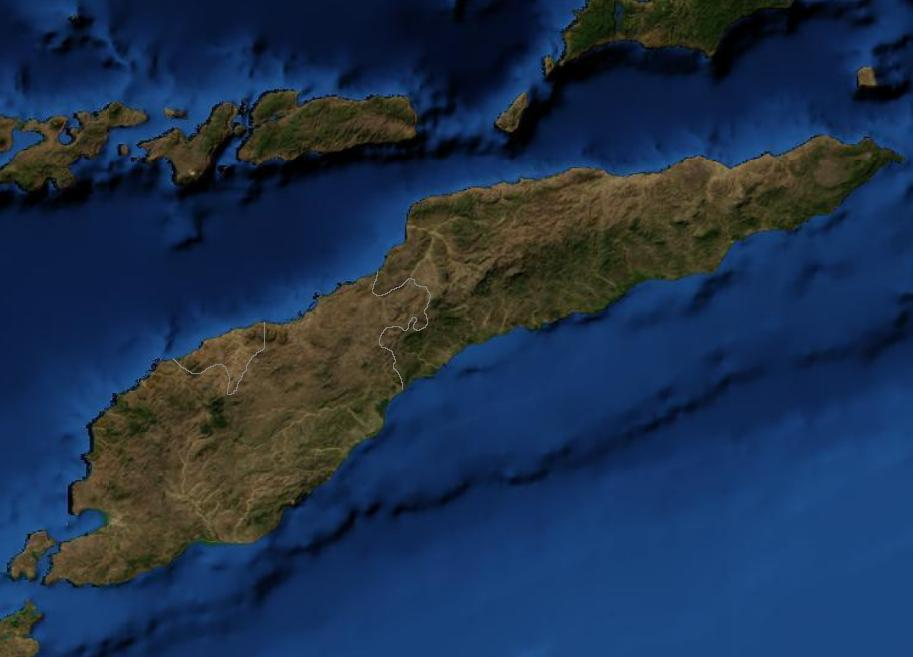
An enlargeable satellite image of the island of Timor

- Climate of Timor-Leste
- Protected areas of Timor-Leste
  - National parks of Timor-Leste
- Wildlife of Timor-Leste
  - Fauna of Timor-Leste
    - Birds of Timor-Leste
    - Mammals of Timor-Leste

==== Natural geographic features of Timor-Leste ====
- Islands of Timor-Leste
- Rivers of Timor-Leste
- World Heritage Sites in Timor-Leste: None

=== Regions of Timor-Leste ===
==== Administrative divisions of Timor-Leste ====
Administrative divisions of Timor-Leste

- Districts of Timor-Leste
  - Administrative posts of Timor-Leste
    - Sucos of Timor-Leste

===== Districts of Timor-Leste =====
Districts of Timor-Leste

===== Administrative posts of Timor-Leste =====
Administrative posts of Timor-Leste

===== Sucos of Timor-Leste =====
Sucos of Timor-Leste

- Capital of Timor-Leste: Dili
- Populated places of Timor-Leste

=== Demography of Timor-Leste ===
Demographics of Timor-Leste

== Government and politics of Timor-Leste ==
- Form of government: unitary semi-presidential representative democratic republic
- Capital of Timor-Leste: Dili
- Elections in Timor-Leste
- Political parties in Timor-Leste

=== Branches of the government of Timor-Leste ===
- Government of Timor-Leste

==== Executive branch of the government of Timor-Leste ====
- Head of state: President of Timor-Leste, Francisco Guterres
- Head of government: Prime Minister of Timor-Leste, Rui Maria de Araújo

==== Legislative branch of the government of Timor-Leste ====
- Parliament of Timor-Leste: National Assembly (unicameral)

==== Judicial branch of the government of Timor-Leste ====
- Court system of Timor-Leste

=== Foreign relations of Timor-Leste ===
- Foreign relations of Timor-Leste
  - Diplomatic missions in Timor-Leste
  - Diplomatic missions of Timor-Leste

==== International organization membership ====
The Democratic Republic of Timor-Leste is a member of:

- African, Caribbean, and Pacific Group of States (ACP)
- Asian Development Bank (ADB)
- Association of Southeast Asian Nations (ASEAN)
- Association of Southeast Asian Nations Regional Forum (ARF)
- Community of Portuguese Language Countries (CPLP)
- Food and Agriculture Organization (FAO)
- Group of 77 (G77)
- International Bank for Reconstruction and Development (IBRD)
- International Civil Aviation Organization (ICAO)
- International Criminal Court (ICCt)
- International Criminal Police Organization (Interpol)
- International Development Association (IDA)
- International Federation of Red Cross and Red Crescent Societies (IFRCS)
- International Finance Corporation (IFC)
- International Fund for Agricultural Development (IFAD)
- International Labour Organization (ILO)
- International Maritime Organization (IMO)
- International Monetary Fund (IMF)
- International Olympic Committee (IOC)
- Inter-Parliamentary Union (IPU)
- Multilateral Investment Guarantee Agency (MIGA)
- Nonaligned Movement (NAM)
- Organisation for the Prohibition of Chemical Weapons (OPCW)
- Pacific Islands Forum (PIF) (observer)
- União Latina
- United Nations (UN)
- United Nations Conference on Trade and Development (UNCTAD)
- United Nations Educational, Scientific, and Cultural Organization (UNESCO)
- United Nations Industrial Development Organization (UNIDO)
- Universal Postal Union (UPU)
- World Customs Organization (WCO)
- World Federation of Trade Unions (WFTU)
- World Health Organization (WHO)
- World Tourism Organization (UNWTO)
- International Telecommunication Union (ITU)

=== Law and order in Timor-Leste ===
- Law of Timor-Leste
  - Cannabis in Timor-Leste
  - Constitution of Timor-Leste
  - Human rights in Timor-Leste
    - LGBTQ rights in Timor-Leste
    - Freedom of religion in Timor-Leste
  - Law enforcement in Timor-Leste

=== Military of Timor-Leste ===
- Timor Leste Defence Force
  - Command
    - Commander-in-chief:
  - Forces
    - Timor Leste Defence Force
  - Military ranks of Timor-Leste

== History of Timor-Leste ==
History of Timor-Leste

== Culture of Timor-Leste ==
Culture of Timor-Leste

- Cuisine of Timor-Leste
- Languages of Timor-Leste
- National symbols of Timor-Leste
  - Coat of arms of Timor-Leste
  - Flag of Timor-Leste
  - National anthem of Timor-Leste
- People of Timor-Leste
- Prostitution in Timor-Leste
- Public holidays in Timor-Leste
- Religion in Timor-Leste
  - Christianity in Timor-Leste
  - Hinduism in Timor-Leste
  - Islam in Timor-Leste
- World Heritage Sites in Timor-Leste: None

=== Art in Timor-Leste ===
- Music of Timor-Leste

=== Sport in Timor-Leste ===
Sport in Timor-Leste

- Football in Timor-Leste
- Timor-Leste at the Olympics

== Economy and infrastructure of Timor-Leste ==
Economy of Timor-Leste

- Economic rank, by nominal GDP (2007): 177th (one hundred and seventy seventh)
- Telecommunications in Timor-Leste
  - Internet in Timor-Leste
- Currency of Timor-Leste: Centavo/Dollar
  - ISO 4217: USD
- Transport in Timor-Leste
  - Airports in Timor-Leste
  - Rail transport in Timor-Leste

== Education in Timor-Leste ==
Education in Timor-Leste

== See also ==
- Timor-Leste
- List of Timor-Leste–related topics
- List of international rankings
- Member state of the United Nations
- Outline of Asia
- Outline of geography
