= Lene Hara Cave =

Cave and archaeological site in East Timor

Lene Hara
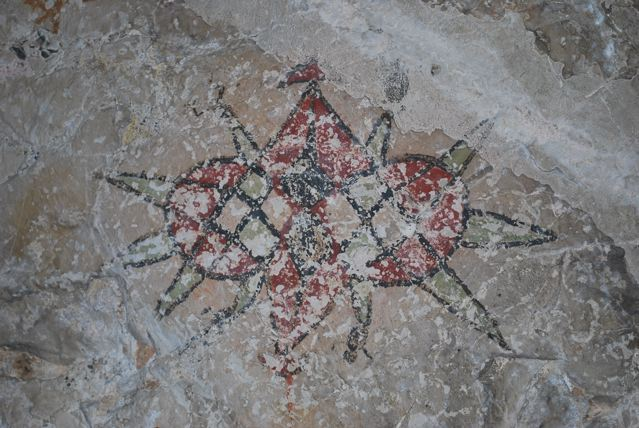
- Paintings in Lene Hara Cave

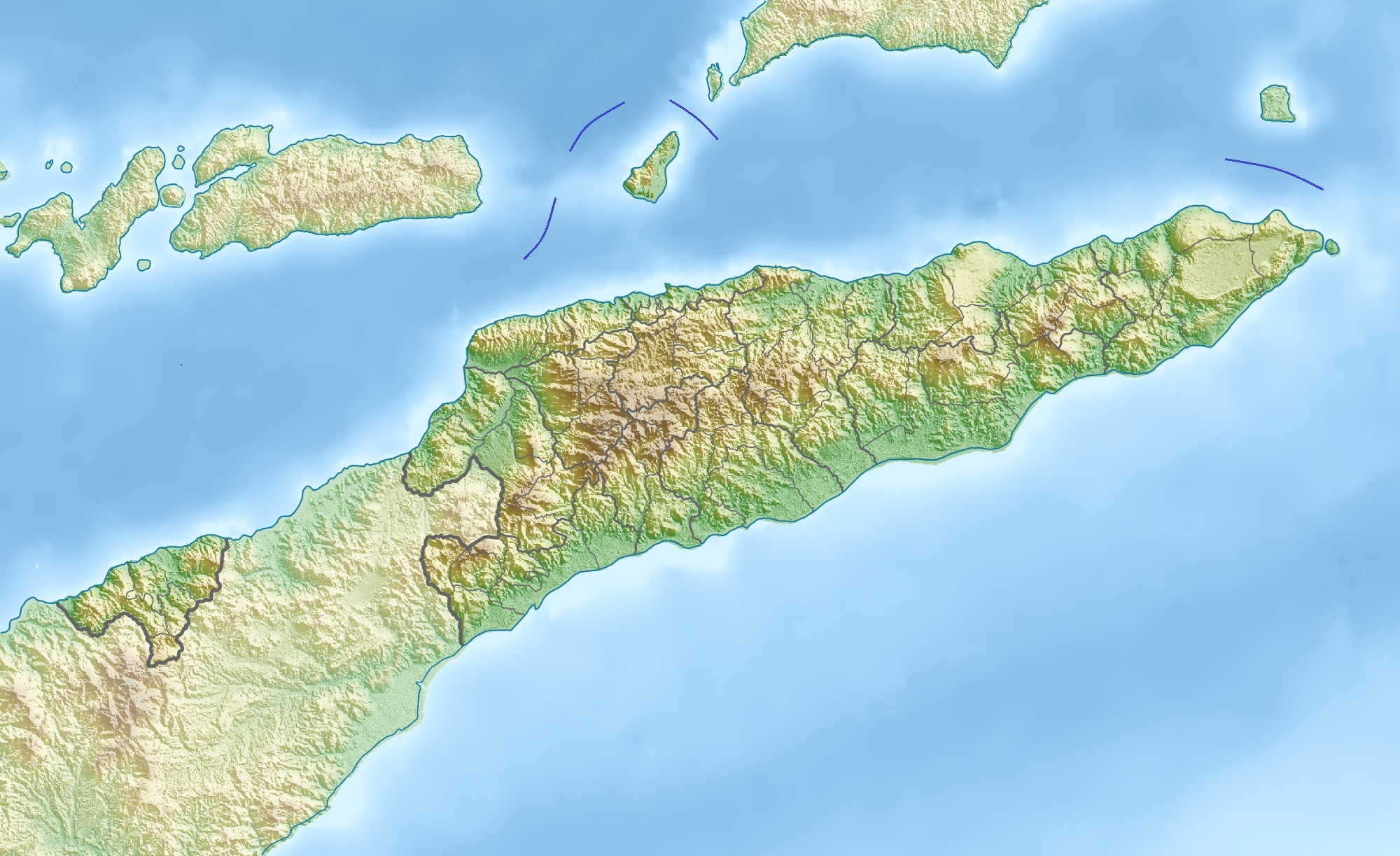
- Location in East Timor Lene Hara Cave (Asia)
- 8°23′32″S 127°17′25″E
- Location: Lautém District
- Region: eastern tip of East Timor

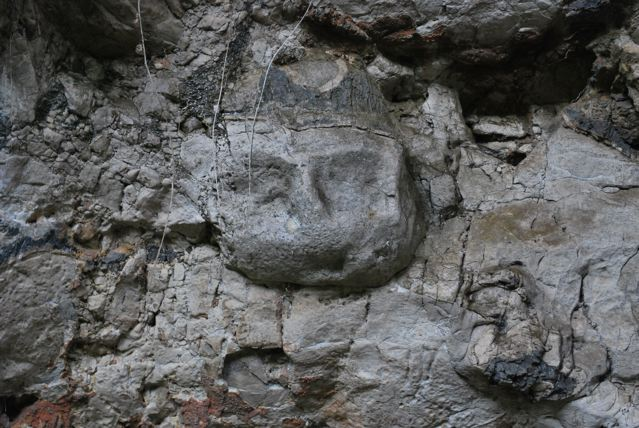
A carved face

The Lena Hara Cave is the main cave of a system of solutional caves in the Lautém District at the eastern tip of East Timor (Timor-Leste), close to the village of Tutuala. Others are Ile Kére Kére and Jerimalai. Lene Hara has provided evidence that Timor has been occupied by humans since at least 35,000 years Before Present and thus is evidence that humans crossed the waters of Wallacea between the Pleistocene continents of Sunda and Sahul.

The cave was first investigated in 1963 by Portuguese anthropologist Antonio de Almeida, when Timor Leste was still under Portuguese rule. Radiocarbon dating of the cave taken from digs beside those investigated by Almeida, by a team led by Sue O'Connor from the Australian National University, shows deposition of shells (trochus and strombus) by transitory inhabitants beginning 35,000 years BP.

O'Connor et al pointed out that the earliest occupation of Australia is dated to around 55,000 BP, so it is unclear whether the early Timor settlers belong to the same wave of colonisation as the first Australian settlers.

O'Connor also reported finding in Lena Hara Holocene fish hooks made from shell, and shell beads.

In May 2009, carved faces were found high in the cave, and have since been dated to 10,000 years. This was reported in the journal Antiquity of February 2011. Paintings in Ile Kére Kére are believed to be 2,000 to 6,000 years old.

In March 2020, 16 hand stencils were discovered at Lene Hara cave, painted in the Pleistocene epoch.
