= Jaco Island =

Uninhabited island in Timor-Leste

Jaco Island; Ilha de Jaco (Portuguese); Illa Jako (Tetum); Totina / Tontina (Fataluku)
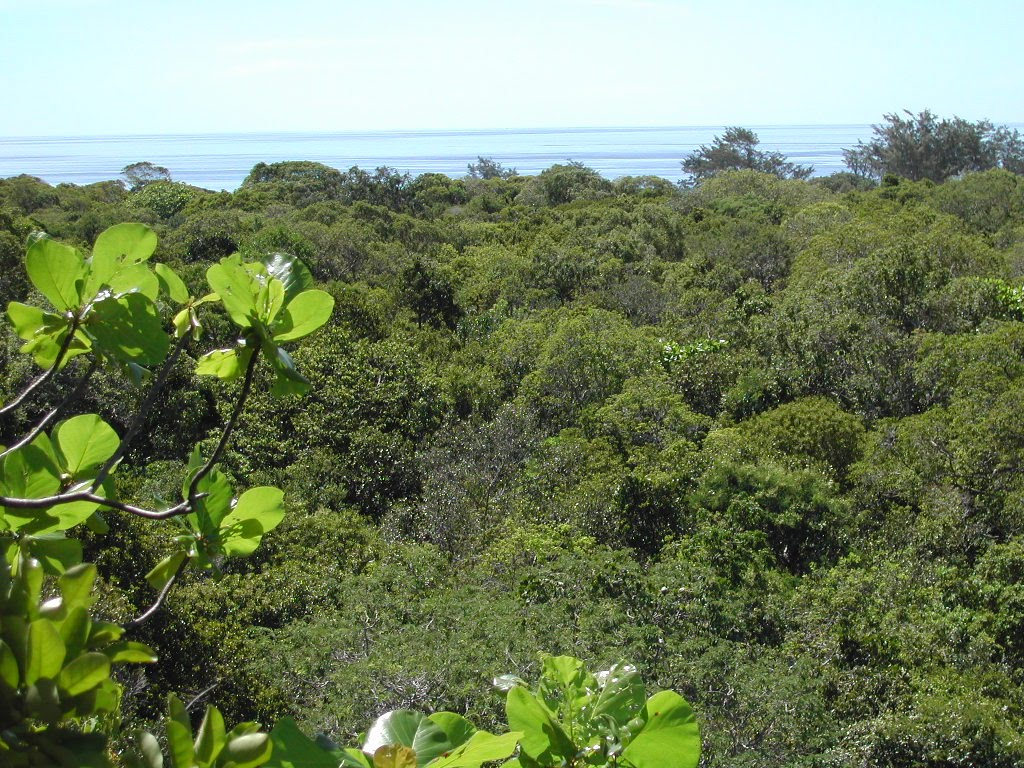
- View over tropical dry forest to coastal strand vegetation on the island

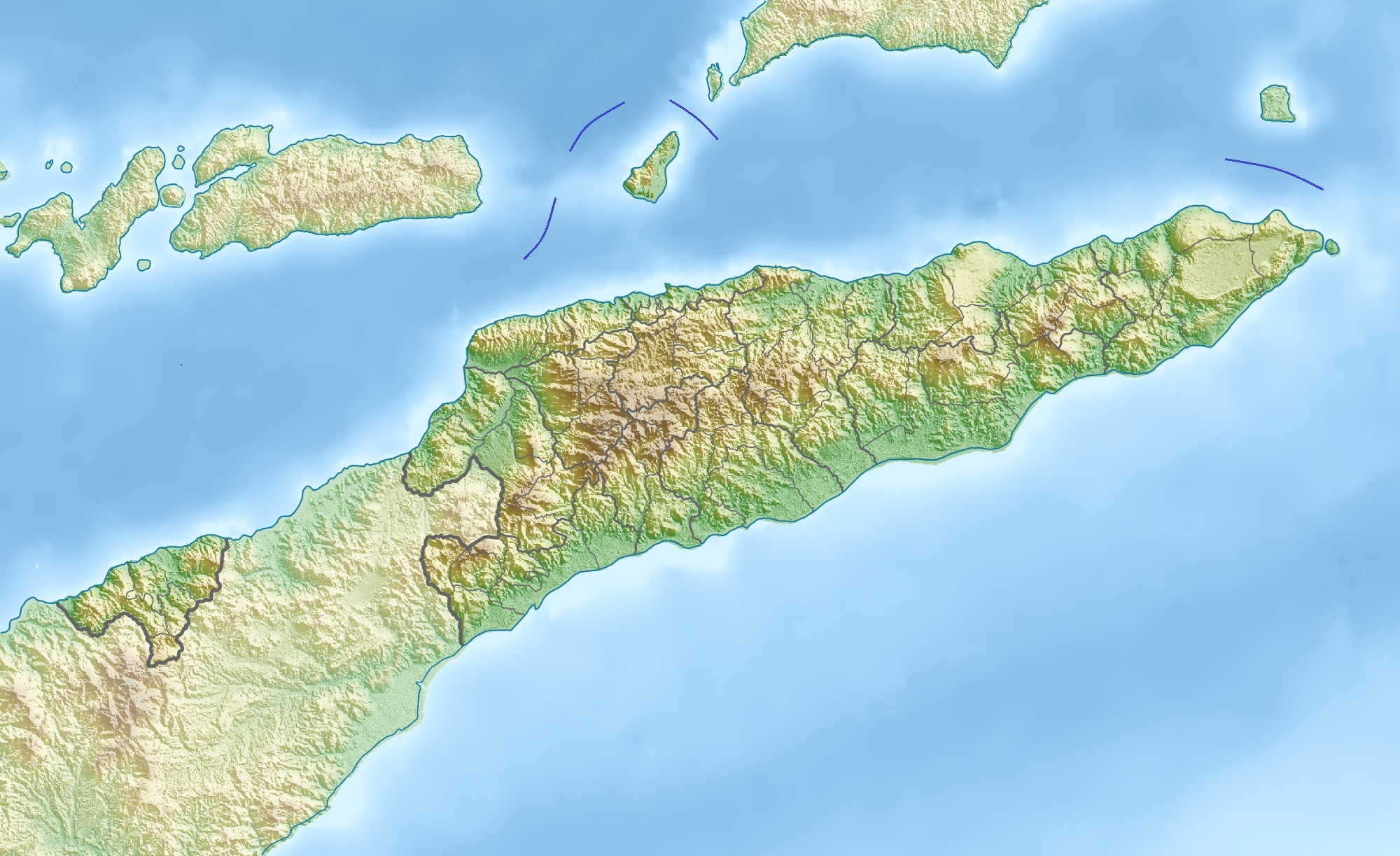
- Location in Timor-Leste

Geography
- Location: Banda Sea (Wetar Strait), Timor Sea
- Coordinates: 8°25′30″S 127°19′30″E
- Archipelago: Timor Archipelago (within the Lesser Sunda Islands)
- Area: 8 km^{2} (3.1 sq mi)
- Length: 4.2 km (2.61 mi)
- Highest elevation: 100 m (300 ft)

Administration
- Timor-Leste

Demographics
- Population: 0 (2024)

Jaco Island (Portuguese: Ilha de Jaco, Tetum: Illa Jako, Fataluku: Totina or Tontina) is an uninhabited island in Timor-Leste, a country occupying the eastern end of the island of Timor in the Lesser Sunda Islands in Southeast Asia. It lies off the eastern tip with Cape Cutcha of the island of Timor (Aldeia Pitileti, Suco Tutuala, administrative post Tutuala, municipality Lautém).

== Overview ==
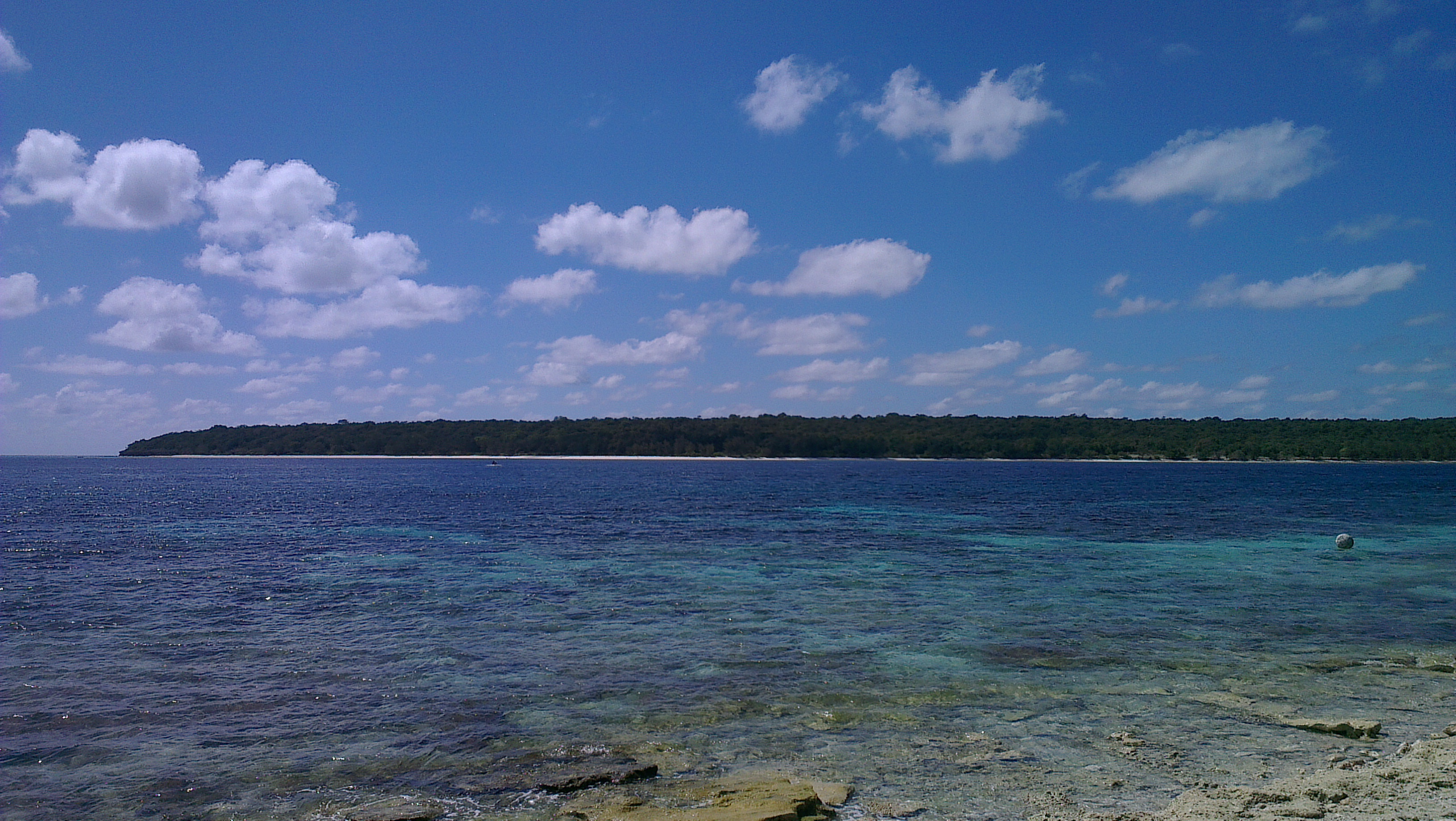
View of Jaco from the Valu Beach

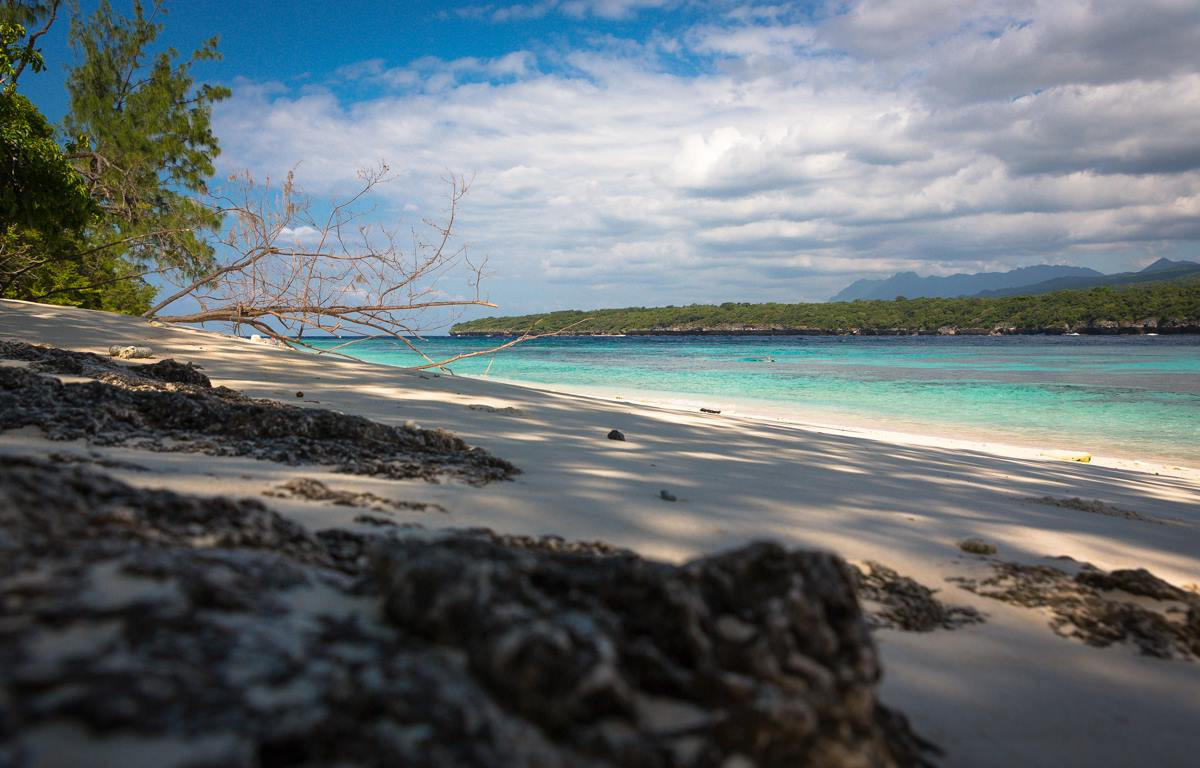
View from Jaco Island to the South East to Timor

Jaco is made of limestone formed from coral. Limestone cliffs and coral reefs surround the densely forested island, which is part of the Nino Konis Santana National Park.

Jaco Island lies just off the eastern end of the island of Timor, part of the Tutuala subdistrict in Lautém District, and is separated from the mainland in front of Valu Beach by a 600 m-wide (660 yd) channel or strait (known as Jaco Strait) navigable by small vessels.

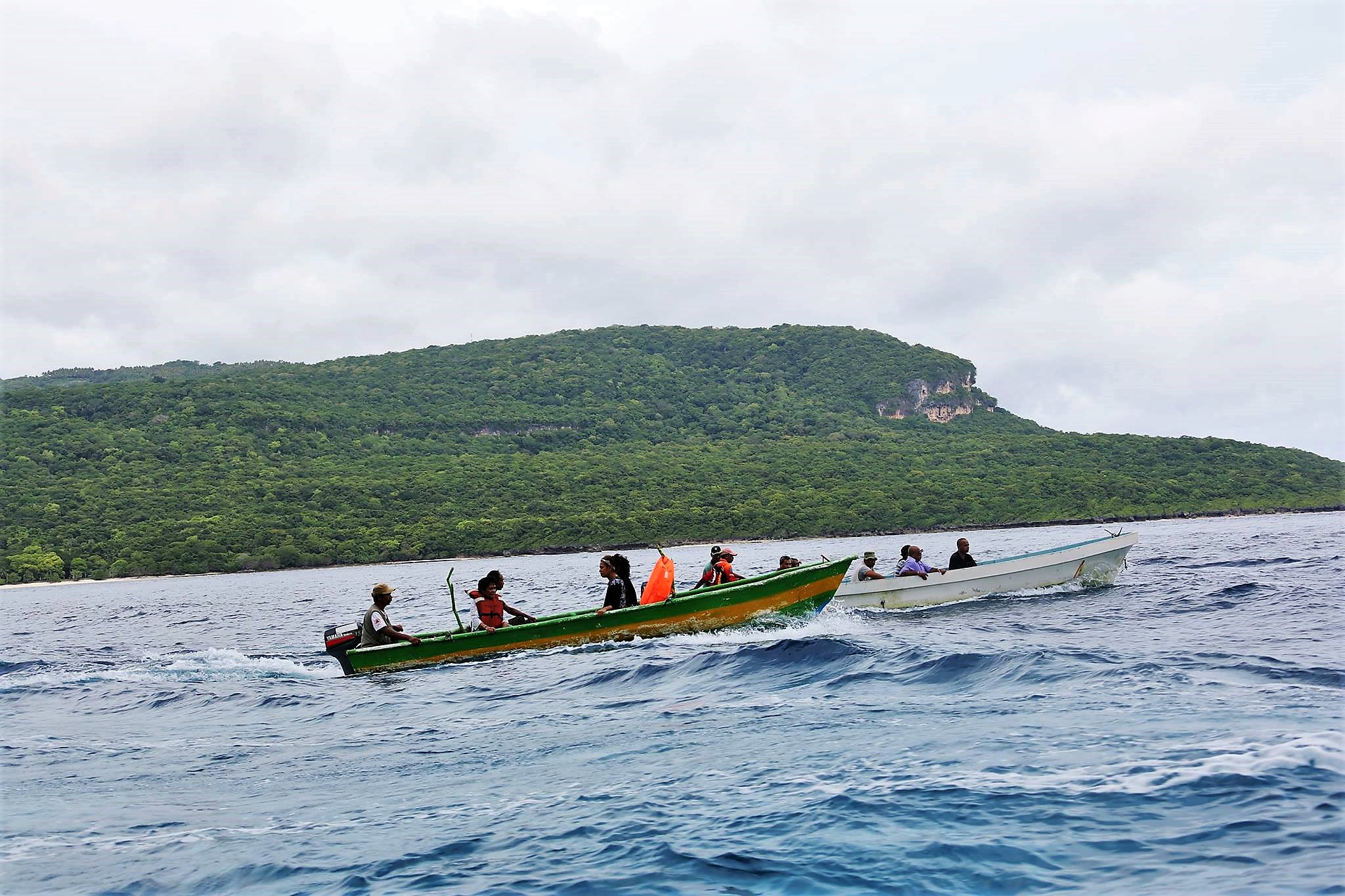
Tourists are ferried to Jaco on fishing boats like these

Jaco is regarded as sacred by the local population because the beach and the channel are sometimes said to be the points where Timor Sea (Tasi Mane, the men's sea) meets the boundary between the Banda Sea (Tasi Feto, the women's sea) including Wetar Strait to the north and Timor Sea to the south. According to the standard work Limits of Oceans and Seas, 3rd edition (1953), published by the International Hydrographic Organization (IHO), however, the only point where Timor meets those two seas is Tanjong Sewirawa (now known as Cape Cutcha), the eastern extremity of the Timorese mainland. Cape Cutcha is a short distance northwest of the island, and north of the beach. In principle, entering the island, fishing and swimming were therefore forbidden (Tara Bandu). Today, however, fishermen drive tourists from the opposite Valu Beach to the sandy beaches of Jaco for snorkelling and diving. Overnight stays on the island are still not allowed. In February and March, mechi, large feasts of Meci worms (Eunice viridis) are harvested from the sea on the north coast.

At least three places on the island have the remains of ancient fortifications built by the local population to protect settlements: Lai Vai, Pitilete and Honolati. In Portuguese, such fortifications are called tranqueira (English: cover, entrenchment). The only modern structure on the island was a lighthouse from the Indonesian occupation period, a white scaffold tower about 35 m high. It was shut down in 2010 and later dismantled.

The island is low-lying, with an area of 11 km^{2} (4.2 sq mi) and a maximum elevation of about 100 m (330 ft). It is covered mainly by tropical dry forest, fringed by strand vegetation and white sandy beaches. There are some low cliffs on the southern coast.

The East Timorese warship NRTL Jaco is named after the island.

== Climate ==
The average annual temperature is roughly 27 °C (81 °F). On average the island receives 1,436 mm (56.5 in) of rain and the north and east coast of the small island is somewhat drier.

Climate

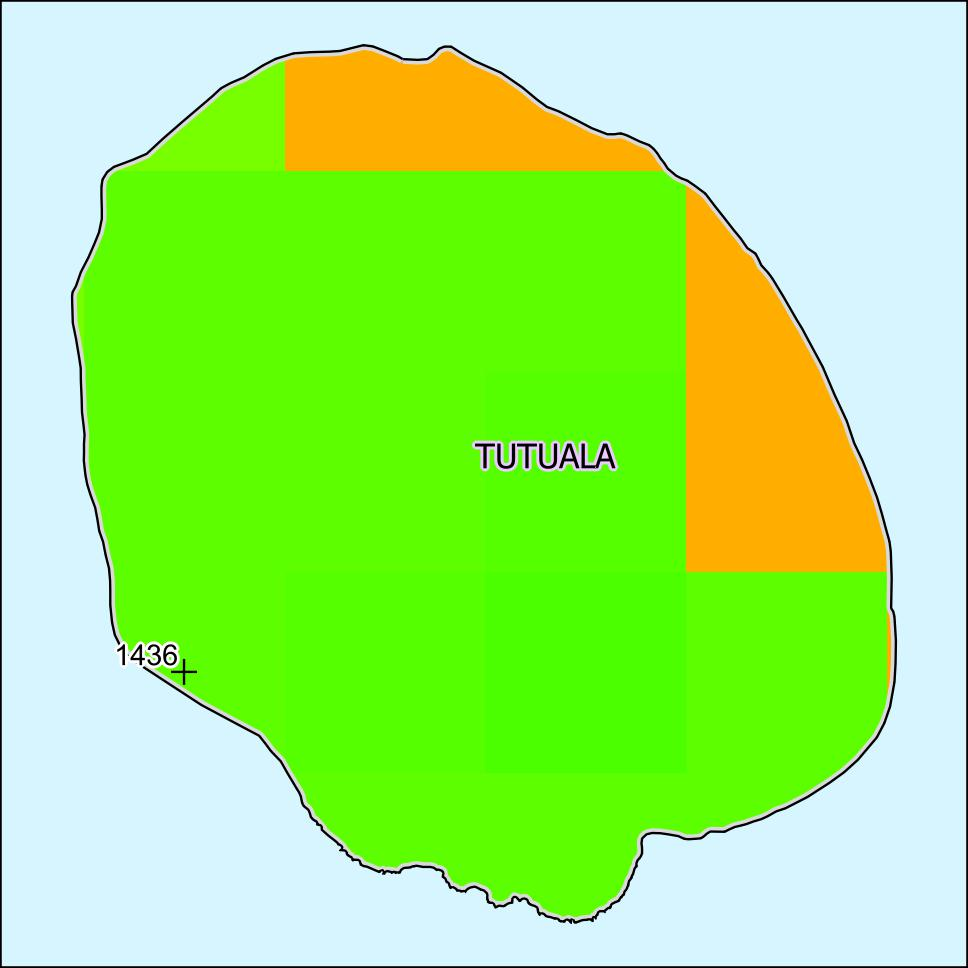
Annual rainfall (2000)

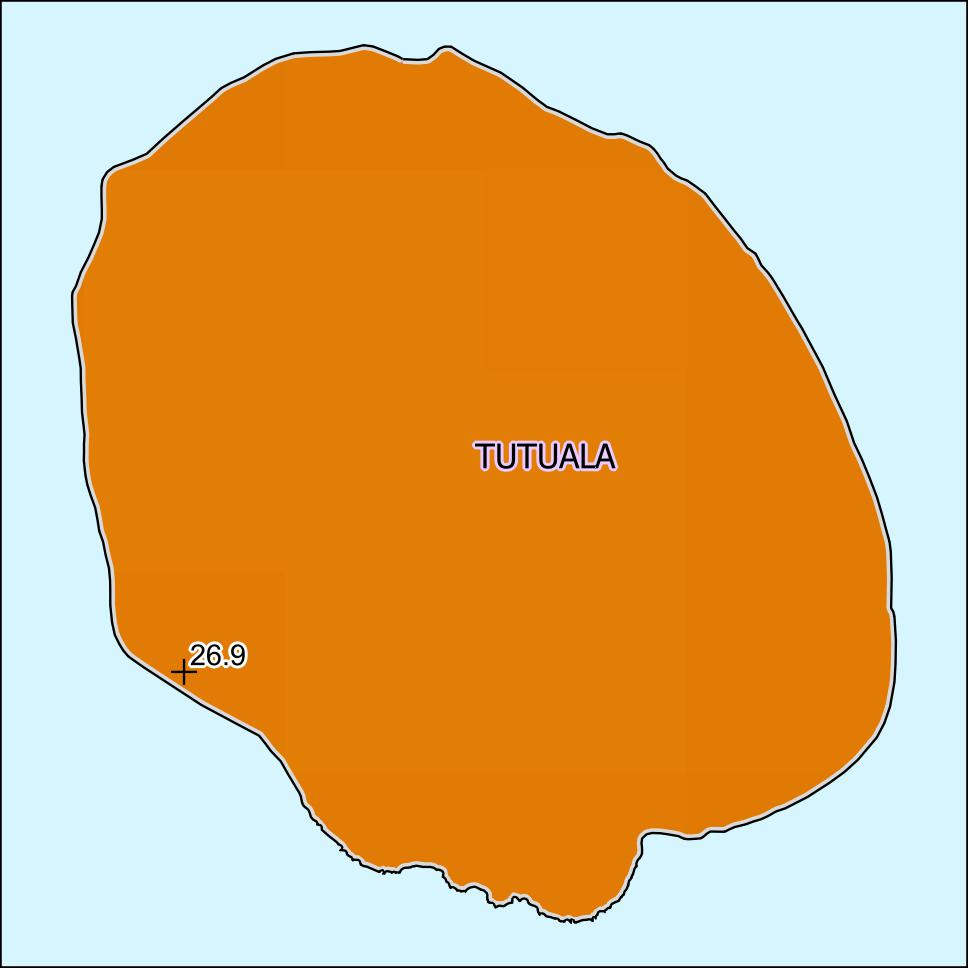
annual average temperature (2000)

== Wildlife ==
Jaco is listed by BirdLife International as an Important Bird Area. The island supports populations of bar-necked cuckoo-doves, black cuckoo-doves, pink-headed imperial pigeons, streak-breasted honeyeaters, fawn-breasted whistlers, blue-cheeked flowerpeckers, flame-breasted sunbirds and Timor sparrows. Rare birds such as the great cuckoo dove ( Macropygia magna ) and the orpheus fathead ( Pachycephala orpheus ) live on the island, which is around 8 km^{2} in size and up to 100 meters high. Javan rusa ( Rusa timorensis ) are also found here which have become accustomed to drinking salt water due to the island's lack of fresh water. In 2019, about 80 deer were counted on the island. This year, however, as late rains in December withered the greenery, several deer died, and 30 of them swam the 600 metres across the strait from the island to Timor to look for food. The beaches in the southeast are used by sea turtles to lay their eggs. Reptiles living on the island include Smooth night skinks and Forest skinks. In the surrounding waters, it is possible to observe whales and dolphins as well as numerous species of fish.

== Gallery ==
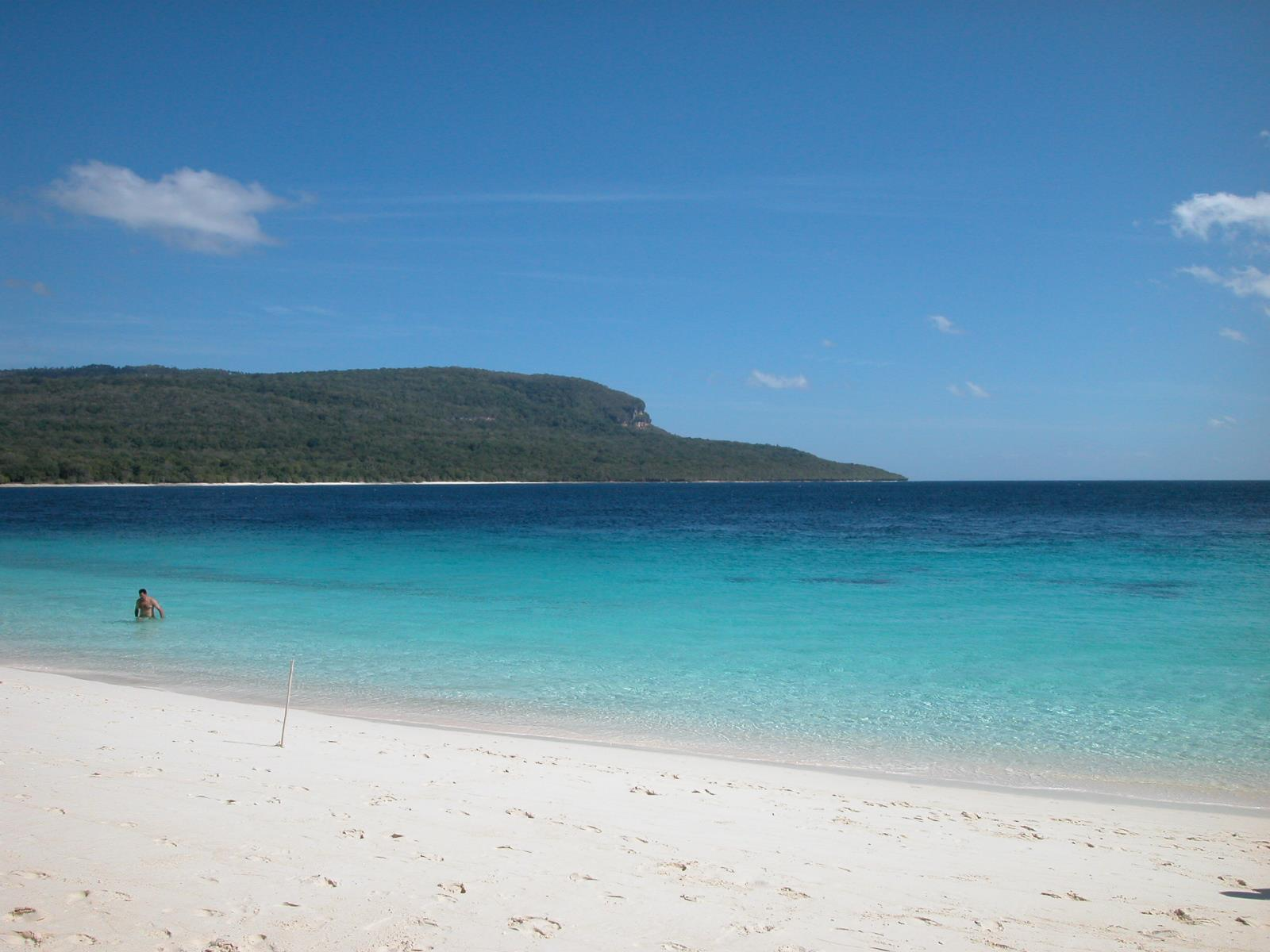
Jaco beach with Cape Cutcha in the background in the dry season ...

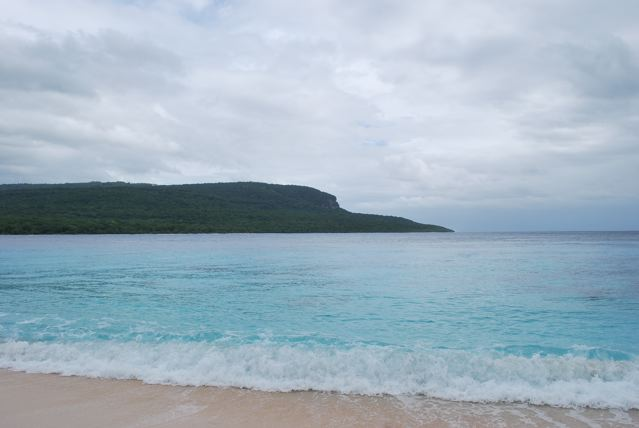
… and during the rainy season

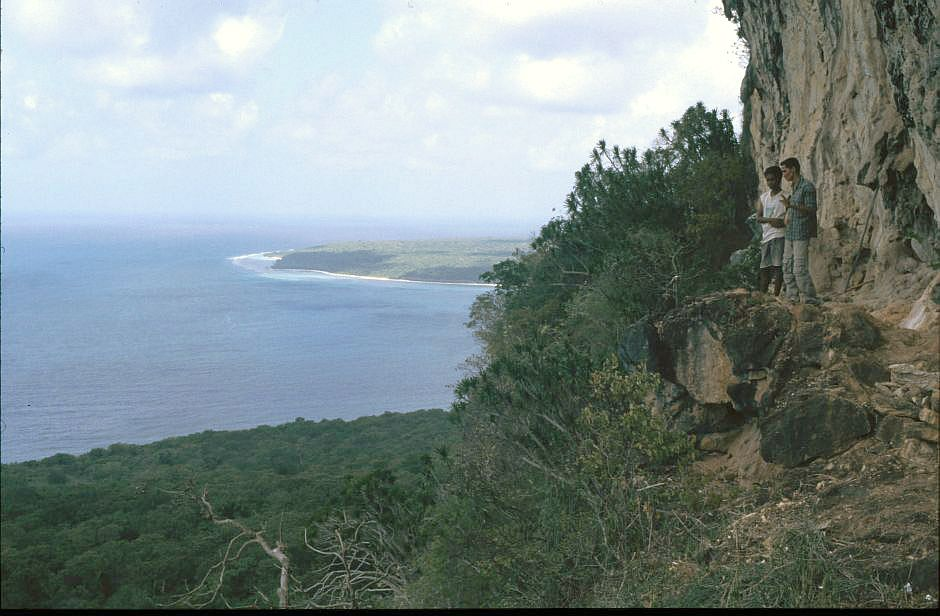
View of Jaco from Ile Kére Kére

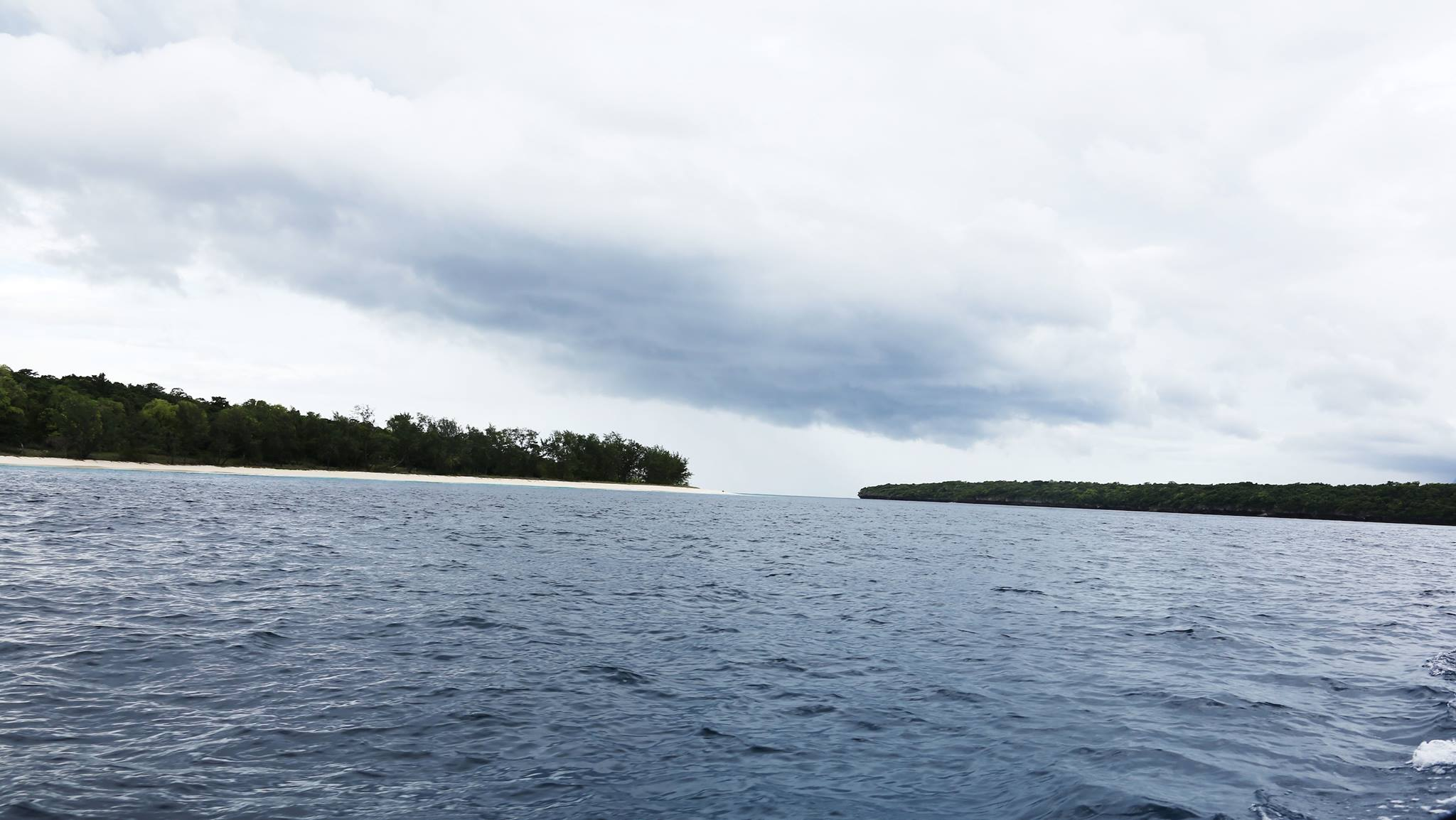
The waterway between Jaco and Timor

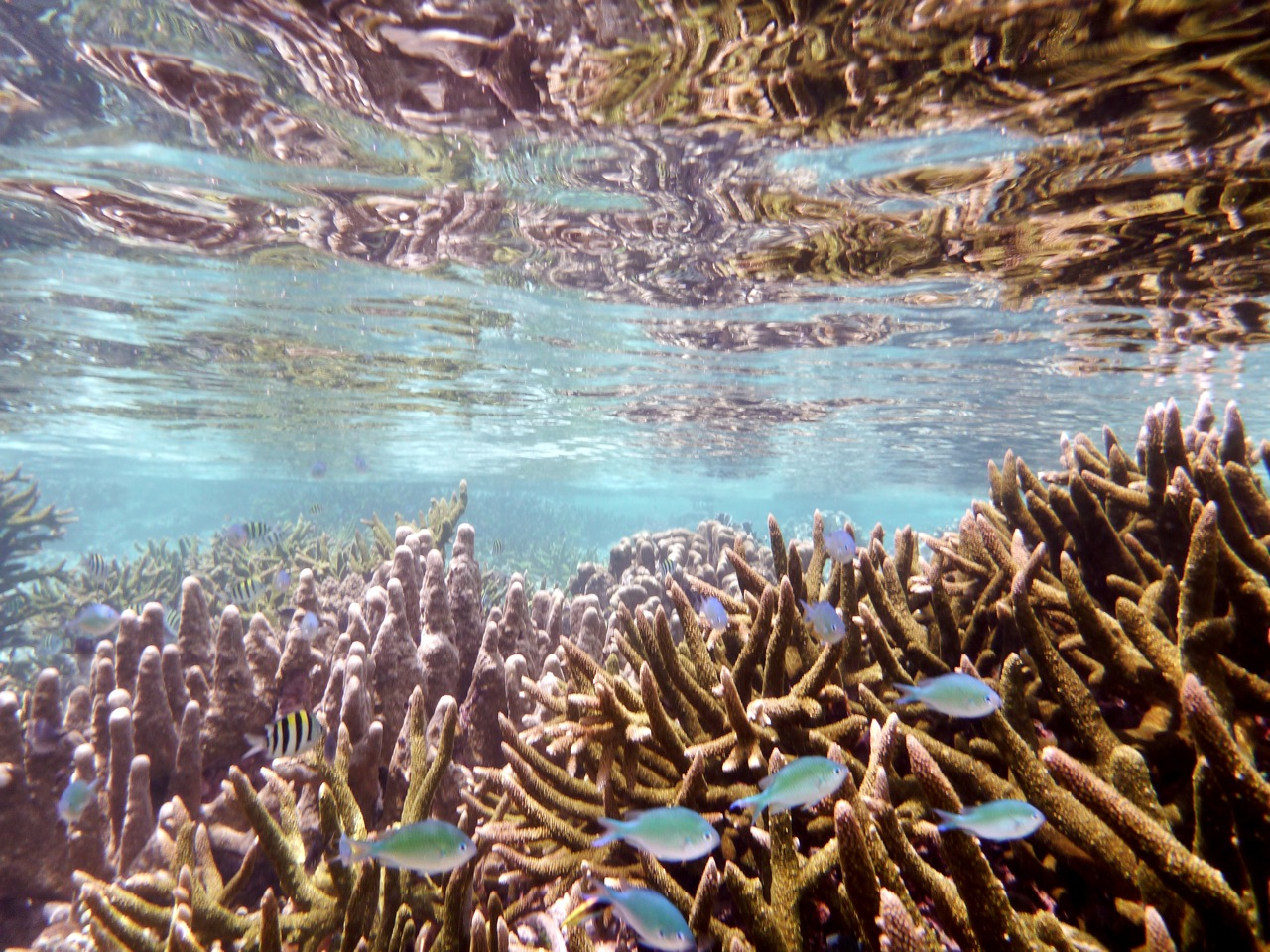
Sea life near Jaco

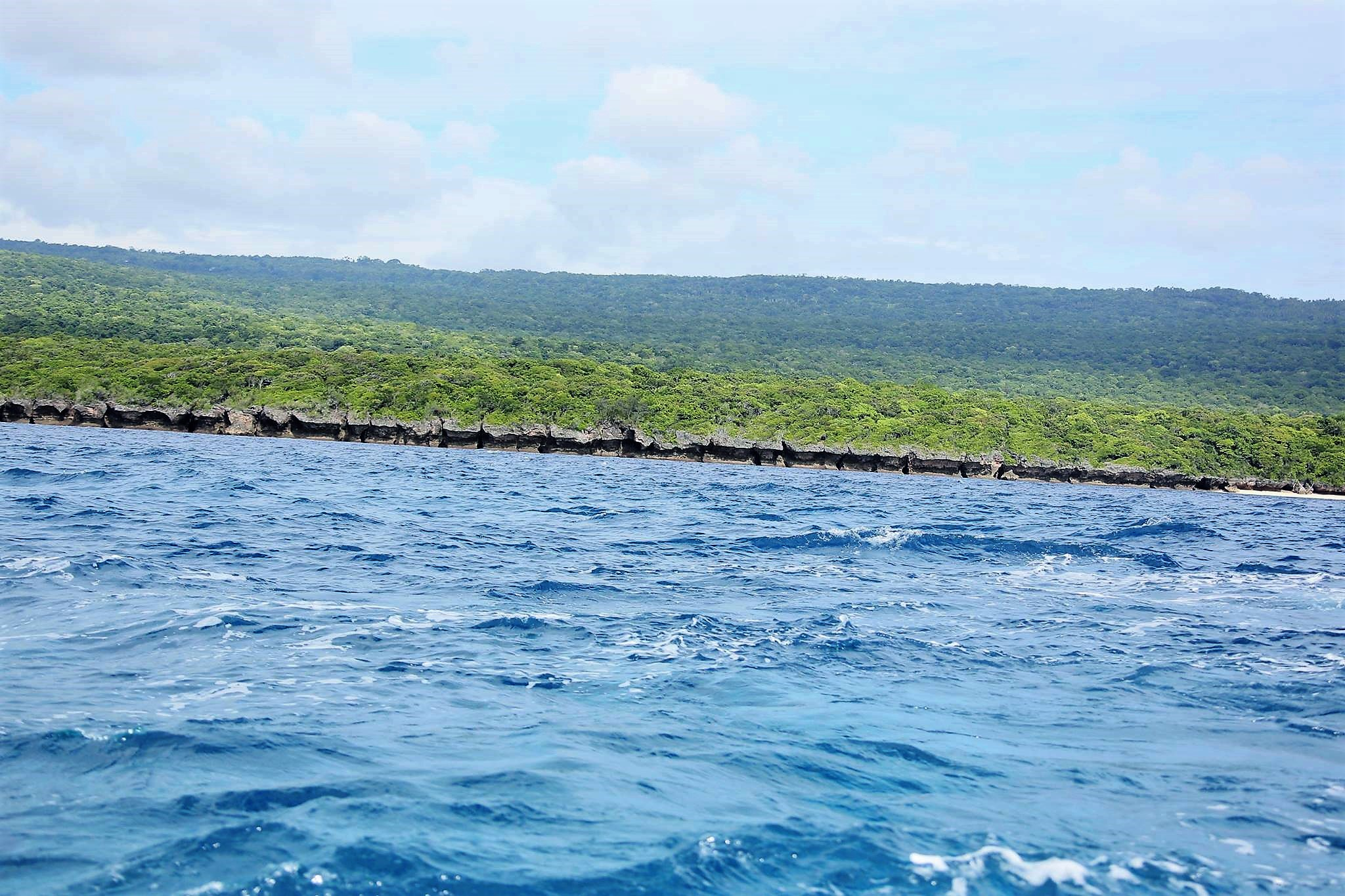
Coast of Jaco off the sandy beaches

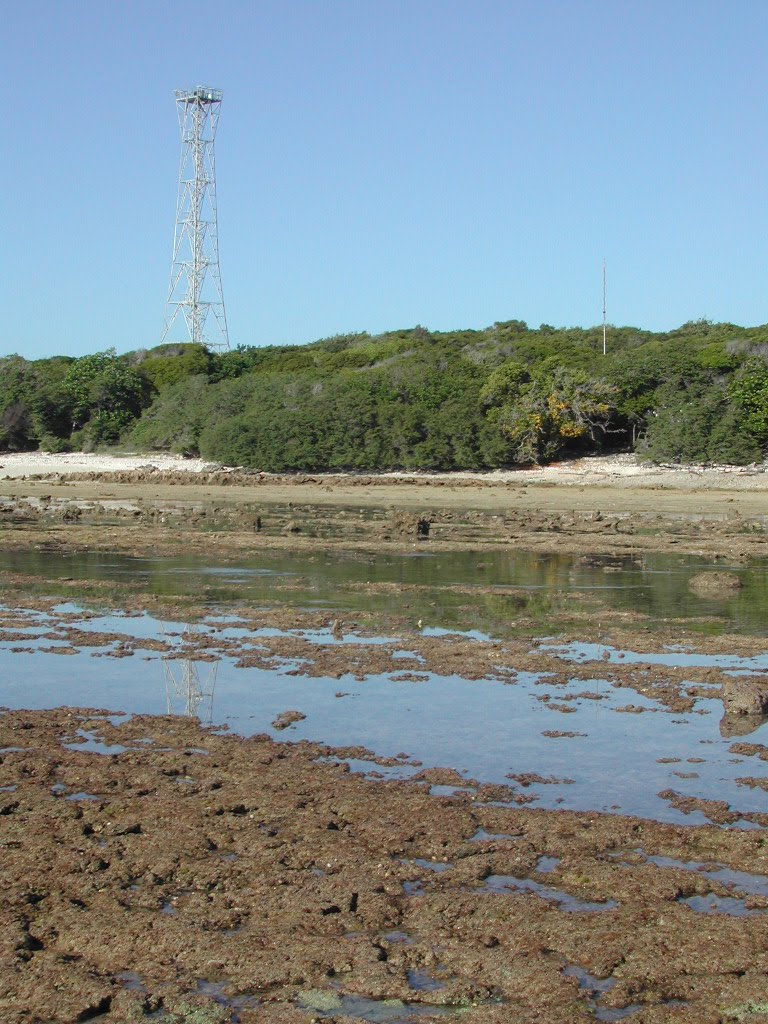
Jaco Island Lighthouse

== See also ==
- Geography of Timor-Leste
- List of Important Bird Areas in Timor-Leste
- List of islands of Timor-Leste
