= Jerimalai (cave) =

Cave and archaeological site in East Timor

- Location in East Timor
- 8°23′38″S 127°16′6″E
- Type: Limestone cave
- Location: near Tutuala, Lautém District
- Region: East Timor

Site notes
- Elevation: 75 m (246 ft)

Jerimalai is a limestone cave southeast of Tutuala, on the eastern tip of East Timor. Fish remains and fish hooks excavated in Jerimalai provide evidence for advanced fishing technique by inhabitants of Timor 42,000 years ago.

Jerimalai has the third oldest findings discovered in Wallacea, after Madjedbebe in mainland Northern Australia and the Laili cave near Manatuto on Timor.

== Location ==
The cave lies at an altitude of 75 m, less than a kilometer from the sea.

42,000 years ago, the sea was 55 m lower than in 2016, and the cave was 2.8 km from the sea. 22,000 years ago, during the Last Glacial Maximum, the sea level was 121 m lower than in 2016 and Jerimalai was 3.5 km from the shore. During the glacial age, the descent from the cave to the coastline was much steeper, which explains why the cave was little used at that time.

== Findings ==
=== Background ===
Since 2005, several archaeological findings dating back more than 42,000 years have been made in the cave. The age of the findings was determined using radiocarbon dating. However, some findings might be older, as their level of Carbon-14 is below the detection limit.

The inhabitants of the cave fed on turtles, tuna and giant rats (probably Coryphomys buehleri). Archaeologists also believe some stones and shells were used as jewelry.

Tools found in Jerimalai are similar to findings in the Liang Bua cave attributed to Homo floresiensis, who lived on the nearby island of Flores until 50,000 years ago. The high similarity has prompted questions about whether tools in Liang Bua were made by Homo sapiens, and not by Homo floresiensis.

=== Fishing ===
The fish remains found in Jerimalai are the oldest evidence of fishing far from the shore. In addition, a fish hook believed to be between 16,000 and 23,000 years old was discovered. The four inches long hook is made from the shell of a marine snail. The hook was used to catch fish in the coastal waters, which at the time were rich in coral reef fish.

The high advancement of fishing technique for the time can be explained by the lack of land animals on Timor in that era. 40,000 years ago, rodents and reptiles were the only land species available to the inhabitants of Timor.

=== Jewelry ===
Five pieces of jewelry were also found, made from the shell of Nautilus pompilius and stained with ocher. They had small tiles and drilled holes. Since nautiluses are usually caught at depths of 150 m or more, it is believed that the shells were collected washed up on the beach. This would also explain why among the thousands of shell fragments (about 50 kg of material was collected during the excavation) only 268 belong to Nautilus pompilius. It is believed that the jewelry made of nautilus shells had a great cultural significance.

=== Migration to Australia ===
The findings corroborate the theory that the anatomically modern man spread from Asia to Australia on the South route over the Lesser Sunda Islands and not on the northern route via Borneo, Sulawesi and New Guinea. Earlier findings on the islands of the southern route were too young to prove that the southern route was the propagation path.

=== Avifauna ===
Jerimalai also preserves fossils of birds. With the exception of an undescribed species of Grus, all the avian remains represent taxa still extant in the present.
