= List of national parks of Timor-Leste =

This is a list of National Parks of East Timor. The national parks of East Timor are run by the Department of Protected Areas and National Parks. The first park, Nino Konis Santana National Park, was established in 2007.

== National Parks ==
World Heritage Site or part of a World Heritage Site

Name	Photo	Location	Area	Established
Nino Konis Santana		Lautém	1,236 km^{2} (477 sq mi)	2007
