= List of islands of Timor-Leste =

Map of Timor and the adjacent small islands of Atauro and Jaco (labelled "Pulau Atauro" and "Pulau Jaco", respectively).

This is a list of islands of East Timor.

== List ==
Island	Other names	Coordinates	Surface area controlled (% of island)	Surface area controlled (quantitative)	Population (2015 census)
Timor	Malay: Timur	9°14′S 124°56′E	49	15,007 km^{2} (5,794 sq mi)	1,183,643
Atauro	Malay: Pulu Kambing; Tetum: Pulau Atauro; Tetum: Pulau Ata'uro; Portuguese: Ilha de Ataúro; Indonesian: Pulau Kambing	08°14′24″S 125°34′48″E	100	140 km^{2} (54 sq mi)	9,274
Jaco	Indonesian: Pulau Jako; Tetum: Pulau Jaco	8°25′30″S 127°19′30″E	100	11 km^{2} (4 sq mi)	0

== See also ==
- Geography of East Timor
- List of islands of Indonesia
