= Tutuala Administrative Post =

Administrative post in Lautém Municipality, Timor-Leste

Tutuala
- Administrative Post
- Posto Administrativo de Tutuala (Portuguese); Postu administrativu Tutuala (Tetun)
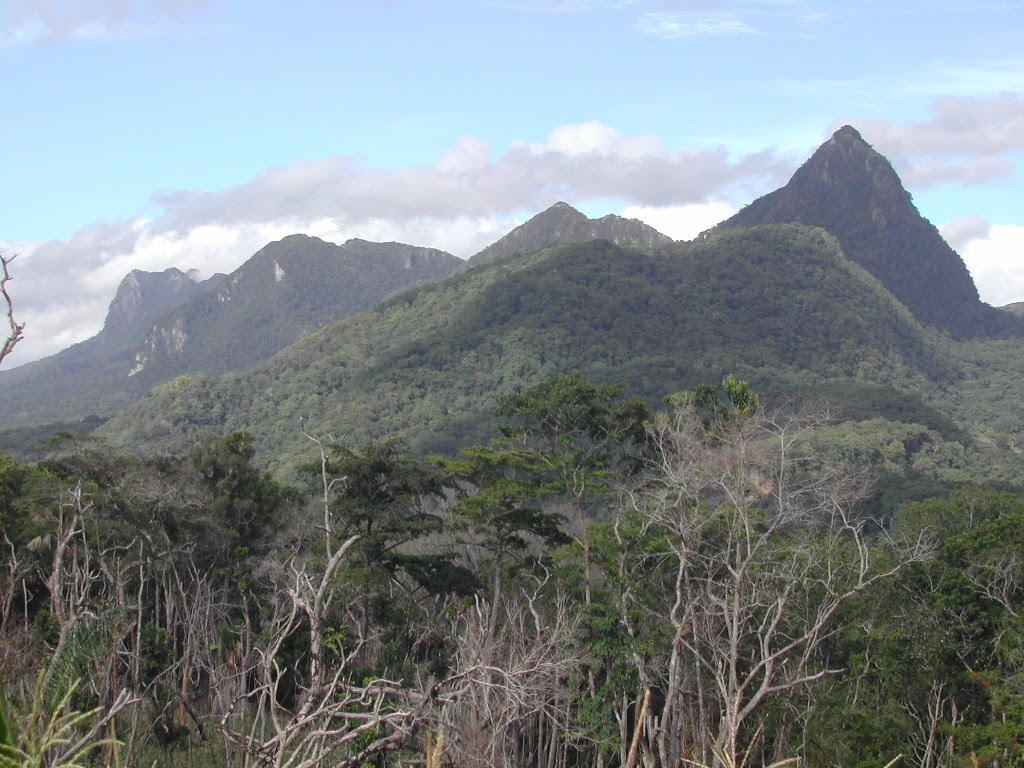
- View west along the Paitchau Range from near Tutuala

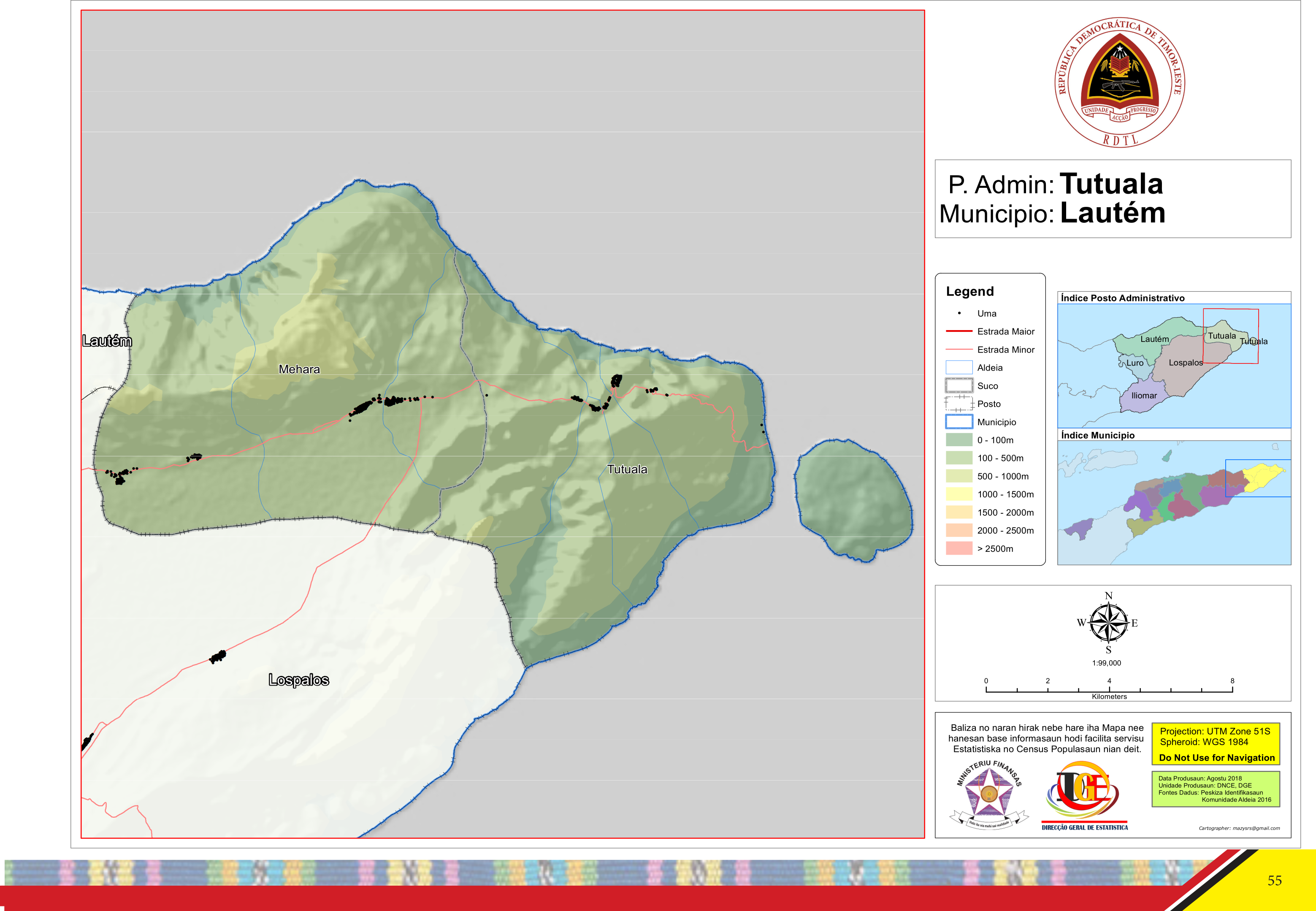
- Official map

- Location within East Timor
- Coordinates: 8°24′S 127°15′E
- Country: Timor-Leste
- Municipality: Lautém
- Seat: Tutuala
- Sucos: Mehara; Tutuala

Area
  - Total: 199.9 km^{2} (77.2 sq mi)

Population (2015 census)
  - Total: 3,514
  - Density: 17.58/km^{2} (45.53/sq mi)

Households (2015 census)
  - Total: 699
- Time zone: UTC+09:00 (TLT)

Tutuala, officially Tutuala Administrative Post (Portuguese: Posto Administrativo de Tutuala, Tetun: Postu administrativu Tutuala), is an administrative post in Lautém municipality, Timor-Leste. Its seat or administrative centre is the village and suco of Tutuala.
