= Tutuala =

- Suco and town
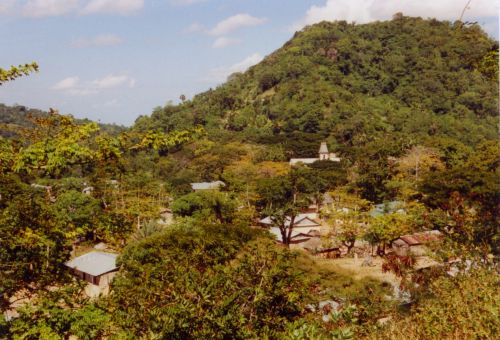
- Village of Tutuala

- Location in Timor-Leste
- Coordinates: 8°23′34.44″S 127°15′24.12″E
- Country: Timor-Leste
- District: Lautém District
- Subdistrict: Tutuala
- Suco: Tutuala

Population (2004)
  - Total: 3,707
- Time zone: UTC+9 (Timor-Leste Standard Time)
- Climate: Aw

Tutuala is a village and suco in the subdistrict of Tutuala in Lautém District, Timor-Leste. It is situated at the extreme eastern end of Timor. Its population at the 2004 census was 3,707. The subdistrict of Tutuala comprises two sucos, including Mehara and Tutuala with the subdistrict administrator residing in Tutuala. The suco of Tutuala comprised four hamlets (aldeia): Ioro, Pitileti, Tchailoro, and Vero. The main Fataluku language areas of the country are in Tutuala, as well as Lautem and Fuiloro.

== History ==
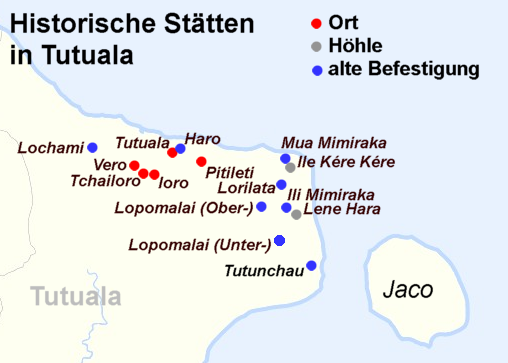
Historical places around Tutuala
(red: villages;
grey: caves;
blue: fortifications)

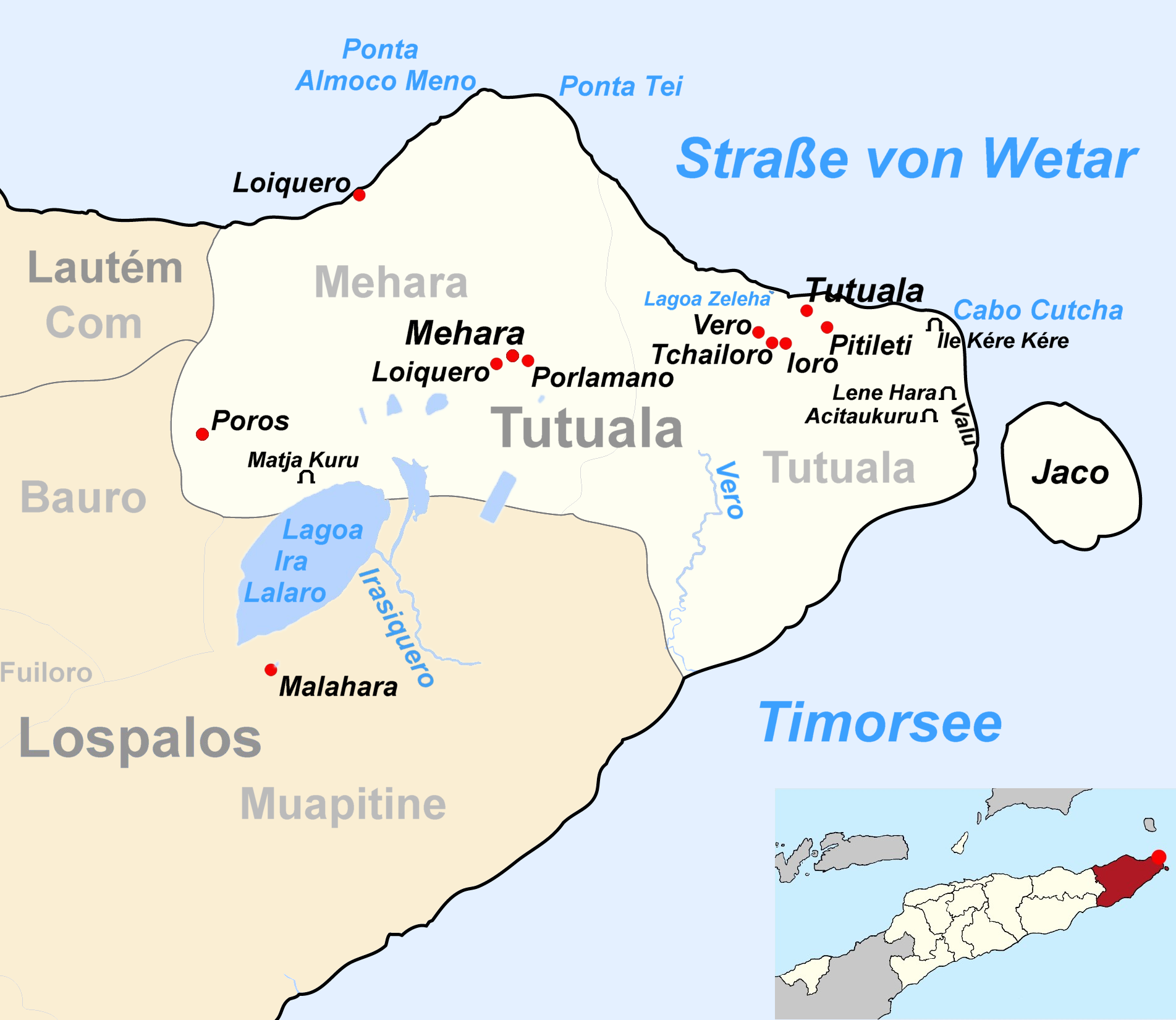
Map of Tutuala administrative post

In Tutuala, 24 clans or ratu have been identified. Tutuala were the native ratu in the village. Senior people in the ratu are considered as the "Lord of the Land" (Mua Occawa) of the region. According to local tradition, the Tutuala ratu and Kati ratu clans originally spoke the Makuva language. All other clans in the district originated from outside Timor, bringing their own language with them during their migration. One clan has been identified as originating from southeastern Maluku.

Until World War II, the Lata people were settled in ancestral homes inside the forests, dependent upon the forests for their livelihoods. Many villages settled along the edges of the road or along the coast date to the period of Portuguese occupation, and after 1945 during the Indonesian occupation. Forested uplands in the Tutuala area were inhabited by the ratu or "clan groups" which included the walled and open settlements of Lata and also caves (veraka) which housed ancestral figures. According to Timorese legend, Fataluku people believe that "Jaco Island (Totina), near Titula, is identified by Fatalaku people as "the head of the land", while the rest of the island constitutions the body".

== Geography ==
Tutuala is situated at the eastern end of Timor, 31 kilometres (19 mi) northeast of Lospalos. Tutuala is bordered to the north by the Banda Sea, to the southeast by the Timor Sea and to the west by the suco of Mehara. The settlement of Muapitine is separated from Tutuala by the Vekase River. The road to Tutuala passes along the northern periphery of Lake Ira Lalaro and passes through the village of Mehara where Falalaku-style houses can be seen. During the rainy season this stretch of road is prone to flooding from rising lake waters.

Valu Beach, which is 8 kilometres (5.0 mi) from the village, has fine white sand. Jaco Island, which also has fine beaches and is noted for its colourful anemone fish and sea turtles, is separated from Valu Beach by a narrow strait.

Tutuala is situated within the Nino Konis Santana National Park. Geographic features of importance include Lake Ira Lalaro and Mount Paitchau, as well as the caves of Léné Ara, Ile Kére Kére and O Hi.

=== Climate ===
Climate data for Tutuala (Average monthly temperature and precipitation)
Month	Jan	Feb	Mar	Apr	May	Jun	Jul	Aug	Sep	Oct	Nov	Dec	Year
Mean daily maximum °C (°F)	30 (86)	30 (86)	31 (88)	32 (90)	32 (90)	32 (90)	32 (90)	33 (91)	33 (91)	32 (90)	31 (88)	31 (88)	33 (91)
Mean daily minimum °C (°F)	23 (73)	23 (73)	23 (73)	24 (75)	24 (75)	24 (75)	24 (75)	24 (75)	24 (75)	24 (75)	24 (75)	24 (75)	23 (73)
Average precipitation mm (inches)	511.8 (20.15)	446.5 (17.58)	336.3 (13.24)	210.8 (8.30)	238.3 (9.38)	175.1 (6.89)	182.9 (7.20)	160.3 (6.31)	170.3 (6.70)	186.5 (7.34)	324.7 (12.78)	413.6 (16.28)	3,357.1 (132.15)

== Archaeology ==
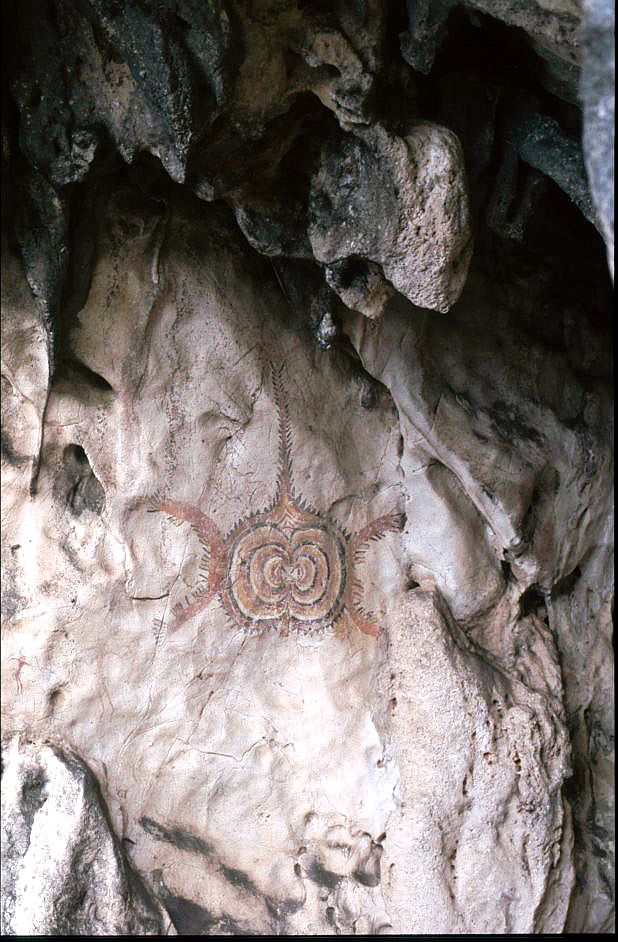
Rock painting in Ile Kére Kére

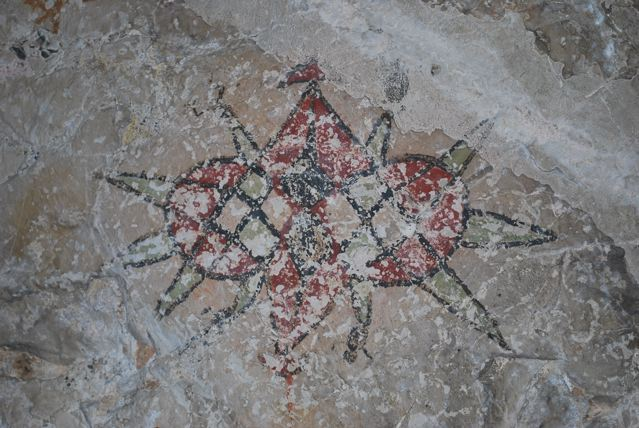
Rock painting in Lene Hara cave

The caves of Ile Kére Kére were excavated in 1966–1967, and numerous items such as stone tools and the bones of giant rats were unearthed, and some of the archaeological finds in the nearby caves of Lene Hara are carbon dated to 30,000 years ago. The caves also had cave paintings. Guerrilla fighters used these caves as hiding places during wartime. Excavations at the Lene Hara cave established occupation at least 30,000-35,000 years ago. Marine shells and stone artifacts have been dated to the Middle Paleolithic through Mesolithic era. The site is a raised limestone terrace situated 1 kilometre (0.62 mi) from the coast. In addition to artifact, painted rock art was also recorded at Lene Hara, in roof panels and stalagmite formations. The rock shelter site, Jerimalai, also located at the tip of the island, was occupied over 42,000 years ago; inhabitants, who left behind stone tools and shells, were noted to have eaten turtles, tuna, and rats.

== Gallery ==
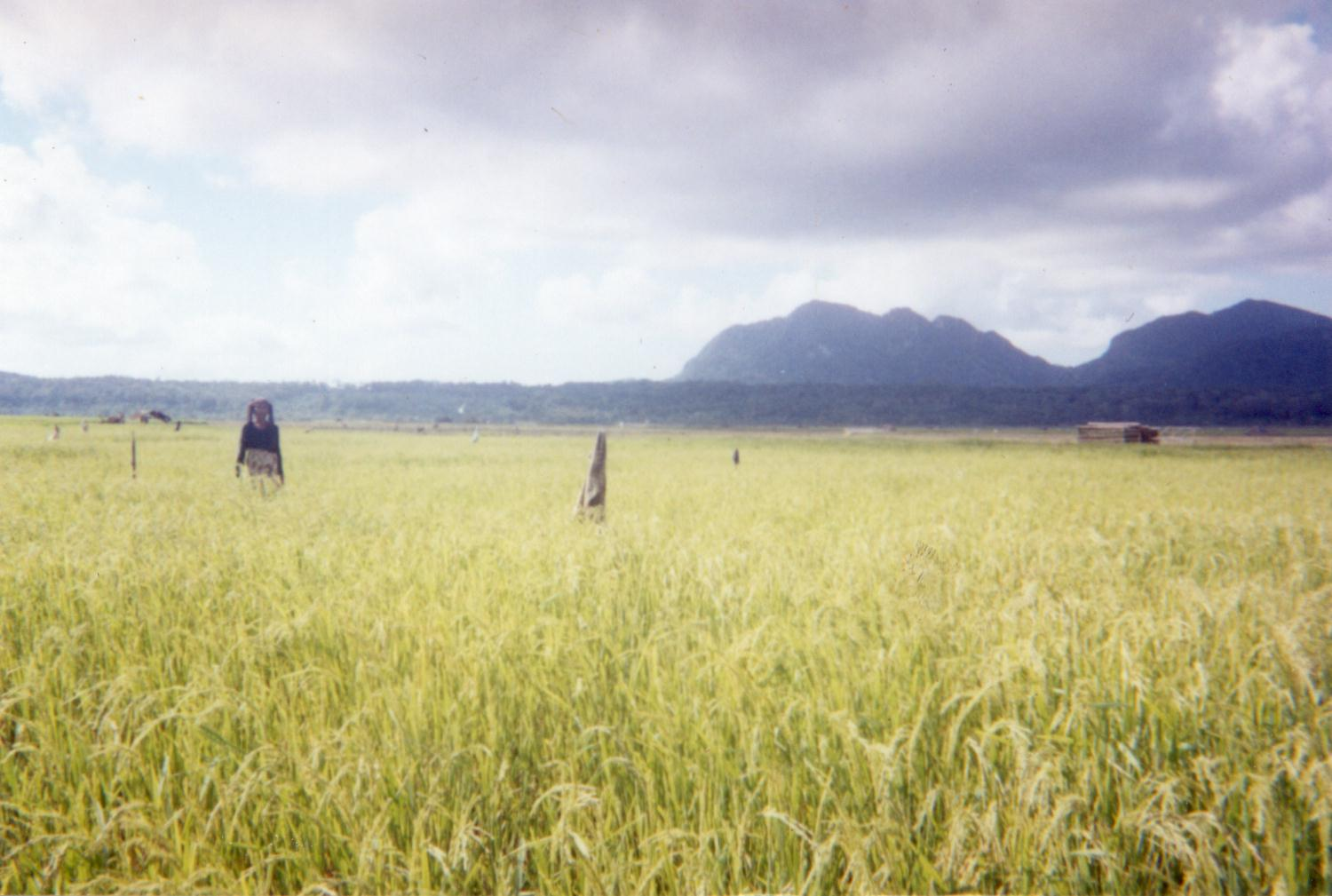
Rice field in Mehara

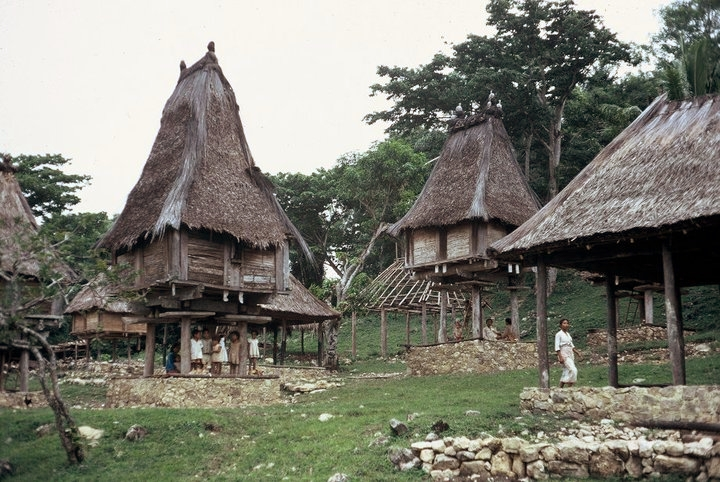
Holy houses and meeting hall in Ioro, 1970

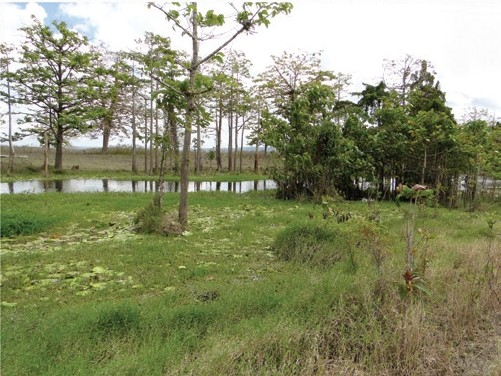
Lake Ira Lalaro floodplain and surrounding area

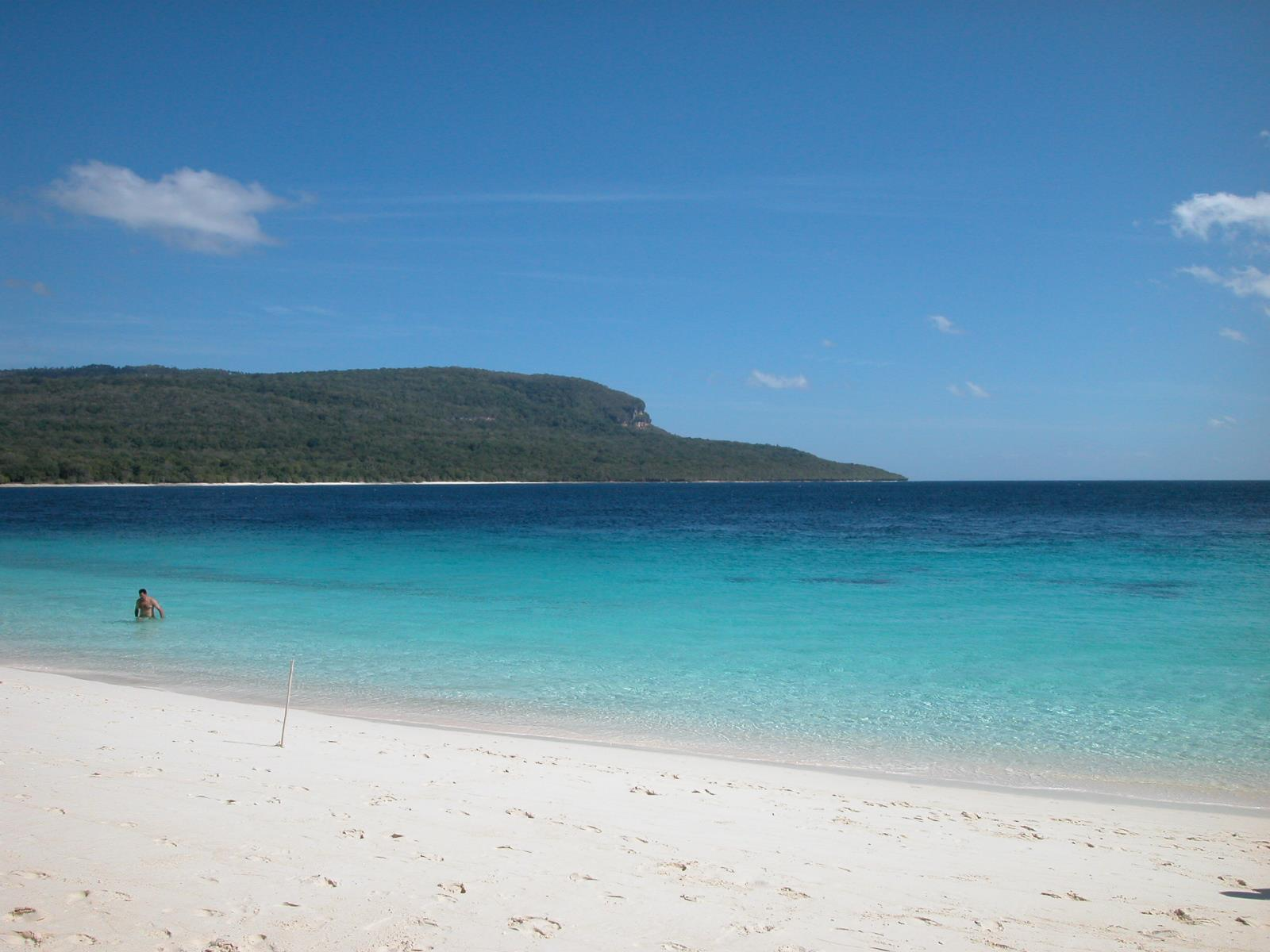
View from Jaco Island
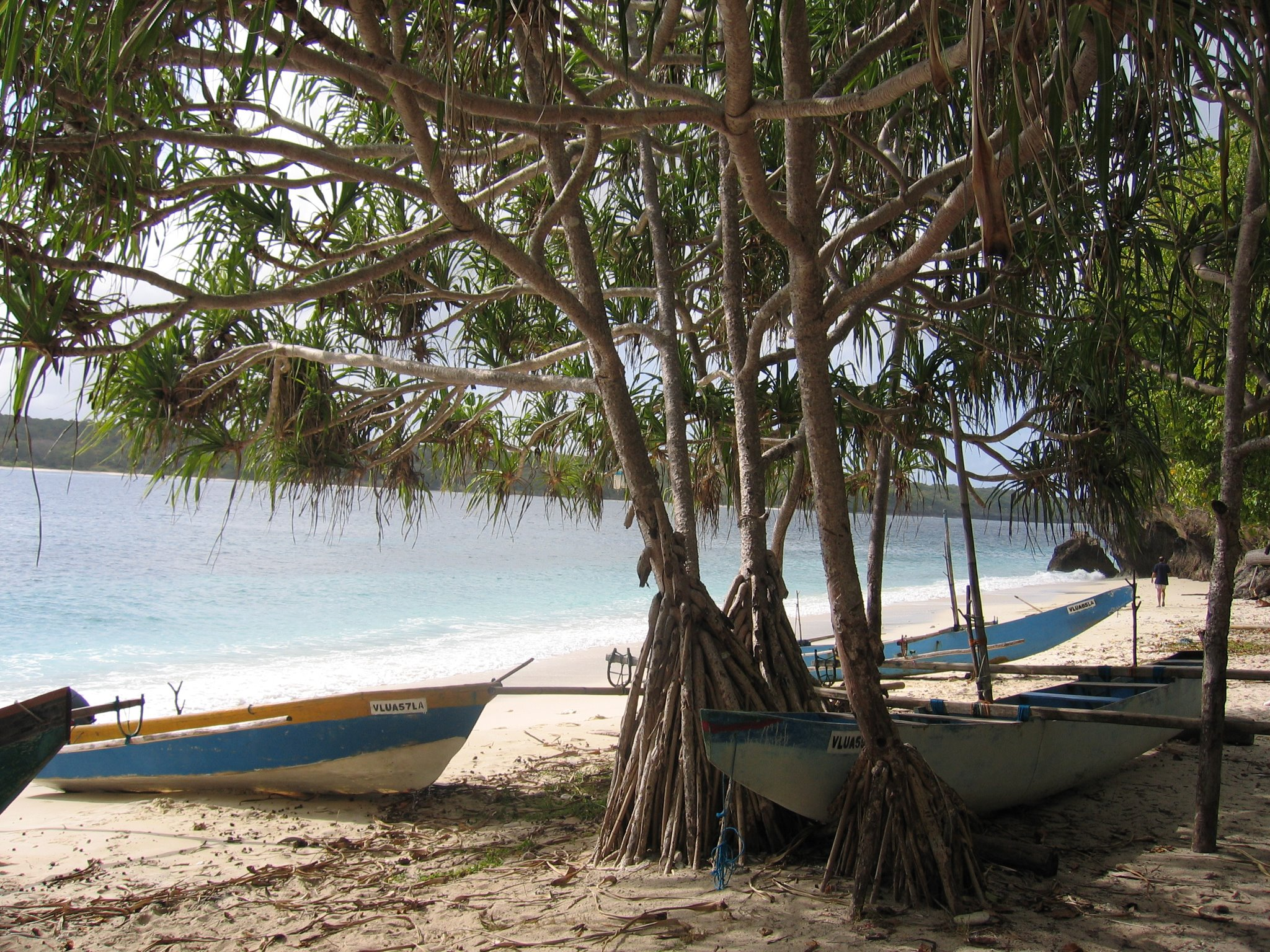
Tutuala beach, in front of Jaco island

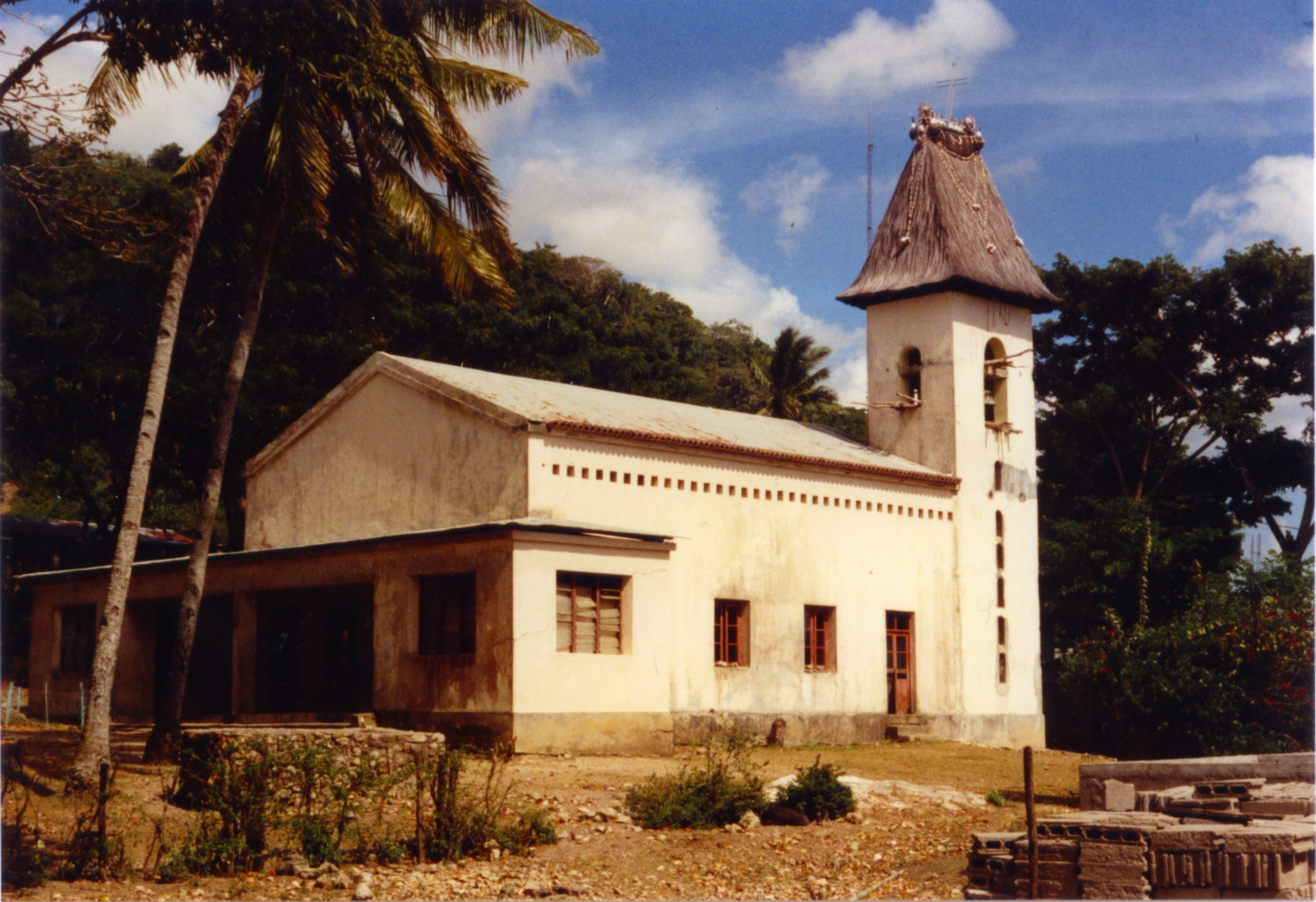
Church in Tutuala

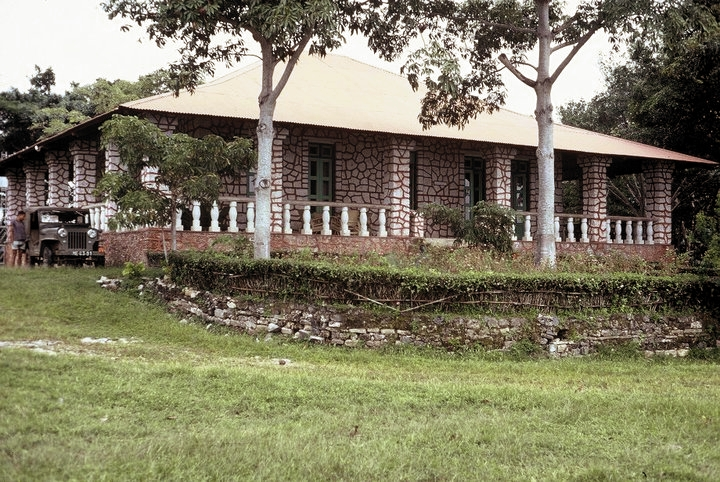
Pousada (hotel) in Tutuala, former seat of the colonial administrator

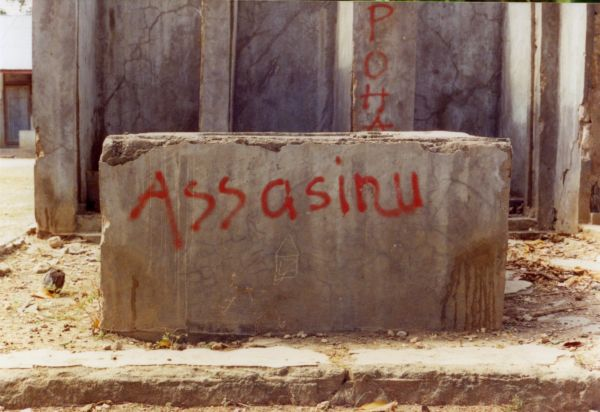
Graffiti in Tutuala, saying "murderer" in memory of the massacre by pro-Indonesian guerrilla forces, 1999
