= Geography of Timor-Leste =

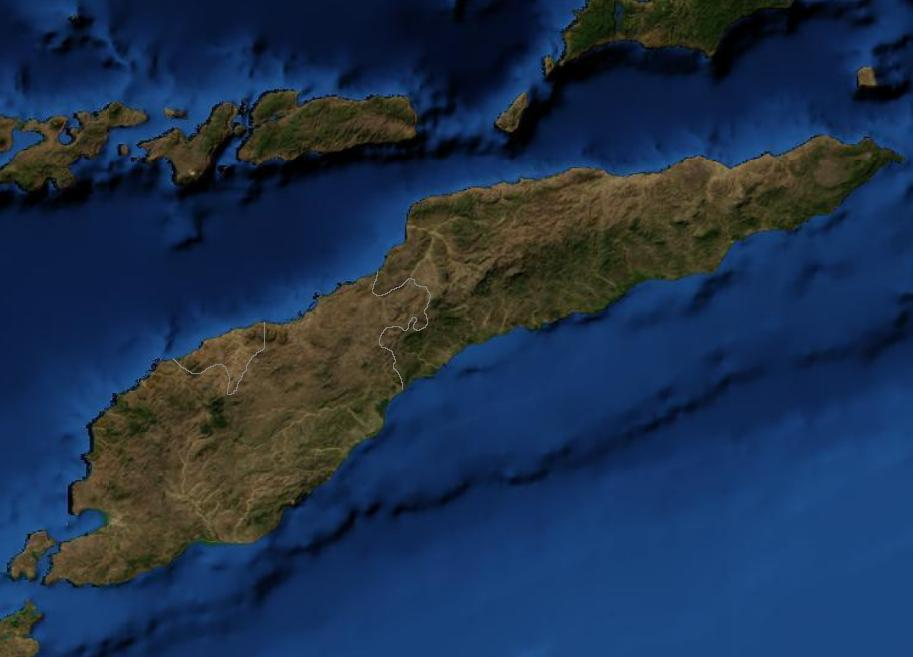
- Continent: Asia
- Region: Southeast Asia: Lesser Sunda Islands
- Coordinates: 8°50′S 125°55′E
- Area: Ranked 154th
  - Total: 15,007 km^{2} (5,794 sq mi)
  - Land: 100%
  - Water: 0%
- Coastline: 706 km (439 mi)
- Borders: Indonesia: 253 km (157 mi)
- Highest point: Tatamailau (2,963 m or 9,721 ft)
- Lowest point: Timor Sea, Savu Sea, and Banda Sea; 0 m (0 ft)
- Longest river: Loes River; 80 km (50 mi)
- Largest lake: Ira Lalaro; 1.9 km^{2} (1 sq mi)
- Climate: Tropical
- Terrain: Mountainous and rugged
- Natural resources: Gold, petroleum, natural gas, manganese, marble
- Natural hazards: Landslides are common; earthquakes; and tsunamis.
- Environmental issues: deforestation and soil erosion
- Exclusive economic zone: 70,326 km^{2} (27,153 mi^{2})

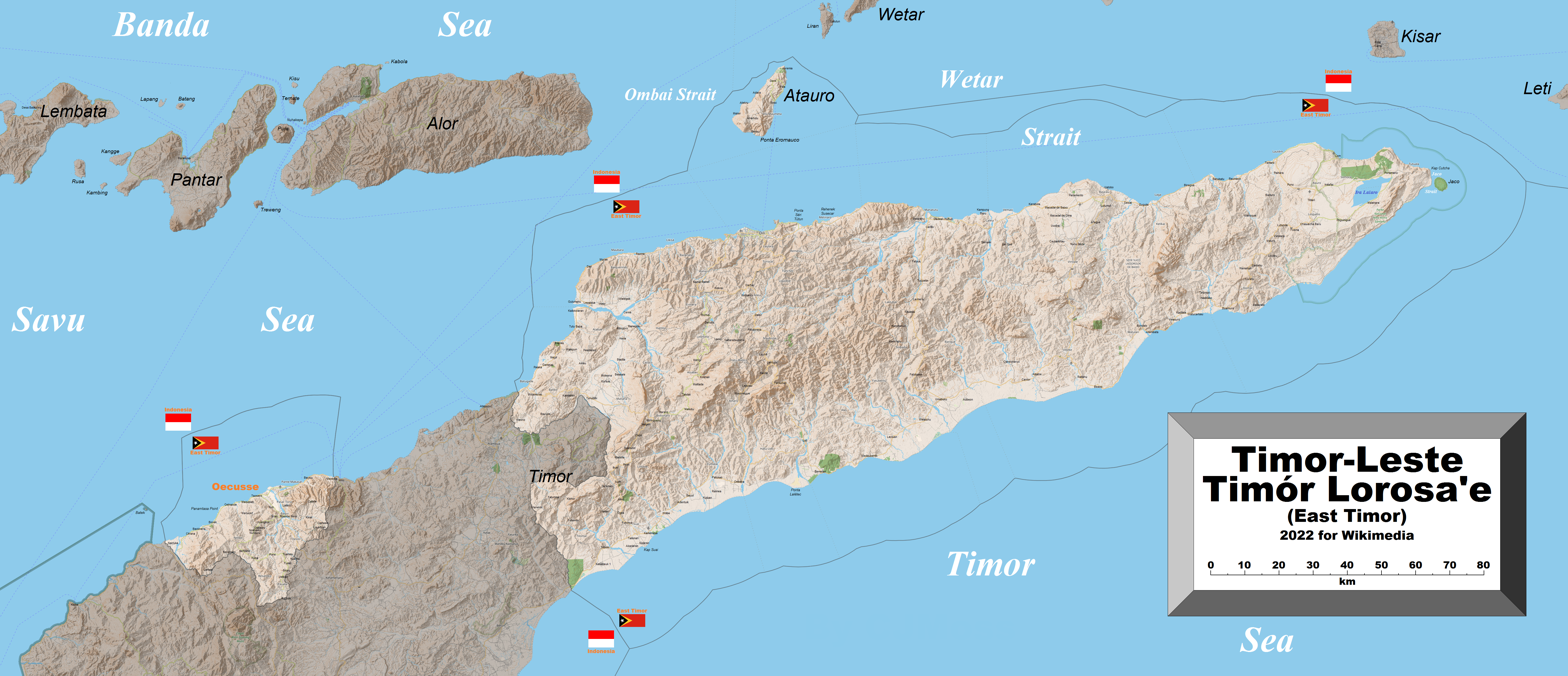
Detailed map of Timor-Leste

Timor-Leste includes the mountainous eastern half of Timor, the Ocussi-Ambeno region on the northwest portion of the island of Timor, and the islands of Atauro and Jaco. The country is located northwest of Australia in the Lesser Sunda Islands at the eastern end of the Indonesian Archipelago. 'Timor' is a Portuguese derivation of 'Timor', the Malay word for "Orient"; the island of Timor is part of the Malay Archipelago and is the largest and easternmost of the Lesser Sunda Islands. Timor-Leste is the only Asian nation to lie entirely within the Southern Hemisphere. The Loes River is the longest with a length of 80 km (50 mi). This river system covers an area of 2,184 km^{2} (843 mi^{2}). It is a small country with a land size of 15,007 km^{2} (5,794 mi^{2}). The exclusive economic zone is 70,326 km^{2} (27,153 mi^{2}).

== Statistics ==
Area
- Total: 15,007 square kilometres (5,794 sq mi)
  - country rank in the world: 154th
- Land: 15,007 square kilometres (5,794 sq mi)
- Water: 0 km^{2}

Area comparative
- Australia comparative: slightly less than 2/9 the size of Tasmania
- Canada comparative: slightly more than 1/4 the size of Nova Scotia
- United Kingdom comparative: slightly larger than Northern Ireland
- United States comparative: slightly larger than Connecticut
- European Union comparative: slightly less than 1/2 the size of Belgium

Land boundaries
- Total: 2,538 km (1,577 mi)
- Border countries: Indonesia (253 km or 157 mi)

Coastline
706 km (439 mi)

Maritime claims
- Territorial sea: 12 nautical miles (14 mi; 22 km)
- Contiguous zone: 24 nautical miles (28 mi; 44 km)
- Exclusive economic zone: 70,326 km^{2} (27,153 mi^{2}) and 200 nautical miles (230 mi; 370 km)

=== Elevation extremes ===
- Lowest point: Timor Sea, Savu Sea, and Banda Sea 0 m
- Highest point: Tatamailau (2,963 m or 9,721 ft)

Natural resources
Gold, petroleum, natural gas, manganese, marble

Land use
- Arable land: 10.1%
- Permanent crops: 4.9%
- Permanent pasture: 10.1%
- Forest: 49.1%
- Other: 25.8% (2011)

Irrigated land
346.5 km^{2} (134 sq mi) (2003)

== Climate ==
The islands have a tropical savanna climate, bordering on a tropical monsoon climate; hot and humid with distinct rainy and dry seasons. Tropical cyclones do occur along with floods.

Climate data for Dili (1914-1963)
Month	Jan	Feb	Mar	Apr	May	Jun	Jul	Aug	Sep	Oct	Nov	Dec	Year
Record high °C (°F)	36.0 (96.8)	35.5 (95.9)	36.6 (97.9)	36.0 (96.8)	35.7 (96.3)	36.5 (97.7)	34.1 (93.4)	35.0 (95.0)	34.0 (93.2)	34.5 (94.1)	36.0 (96.8)	35.5 (95.9)	36.6 (97.9)
Mean daily maximum °C (°F)	31.3 (88.3)	31.1 (88.0)	31.2 (88.2)	31.5 (88.7)	31.3 (88.3)	30.7 (87.3)	30.2 (86.4)	30.1 (86.2)	30.3 (86.5)	30.5 (86.9)	31.4 (88.5)	31.1 (88.0)	30.9 (87.6)
Daily mean °C (°F)	27.7 (81.9)	27.6 (81.7)	27.4 (81.3)	27.4 (81.3)	27.0 (80.6)	26.8 (80.2)	25.5 (77.9)	25.1 (77.2)	25.4 (77.7)	26.0 (78.8)	27.2 (81.0)	27.4 (81.3)	26.6 (79.9)
Mean daily minimum °C (°F)	24.1 (75.4)	24.1 (75.4)	23.5 (74.3)	23.5 (74.3)	22.8 (73.0)	21.9 (71.4)	20.8 (69.4)	20.1 (68.2)	20.5 (68.9)	21.5 (70.7)	23.0 (73.4)	23.6 (74.5)	22.4 (72.3)
Record low °C (°F)	19.0 (66.2)	16.2 (61.2)	16.5 (61.7)	18.2 (64.8)	13.2 (55.8)	14.5 (58.1)	12.4 (54.3)	11.8 (53.2)	13.4 (56.1)	16.1 (61.0)	18.0 (64.4)	16.7 (62.1)	11.8 (53.2)
Average rainfall mm (inches)	139.5 (5.49)	138.7 (5.46)	132.7 (5.22)	104.3 (4.11)	74.9 (2.95)	58.4 (2.30)	20.1 (0.79)	12.1 (0.48)	9.0 (0.35)	12.8 (0.50)	61.4 (2.42)	144.9 (5.70)	908.8 (35.77)
Average rainy days (≥ 1.0 mm)	13	13	11	9	6	4	3	1	1	2	6	11	80
Average relative humidity (%)	80	82	80	77	75	72	71	70	71	72	73	77	75
Mean monthly sunshine hours	189.1	161.0	235.6	234.0	266.6	246.0	272.8	291.4	288.0	297.6	270.0	220.1	2,972.2
Mean daily sunshine hours	6.1	5.7	7.6	7.8	8.6	8.2	8.8	9.4	9.6	9.6	9.0	7.1	8.1
Source: Deutscher Wetterdienst

== Environment ==
Natural hazards
Landslides are common; earthquakes; and tsunamis.
Environment - current issues
Widespread use of slash and burn agriculture has led to deforestation and soil erosion.
Environment - international agreements
Biodiversity, climate change, climate change-Kyoto Protocol, desertification

=== Fauna ===
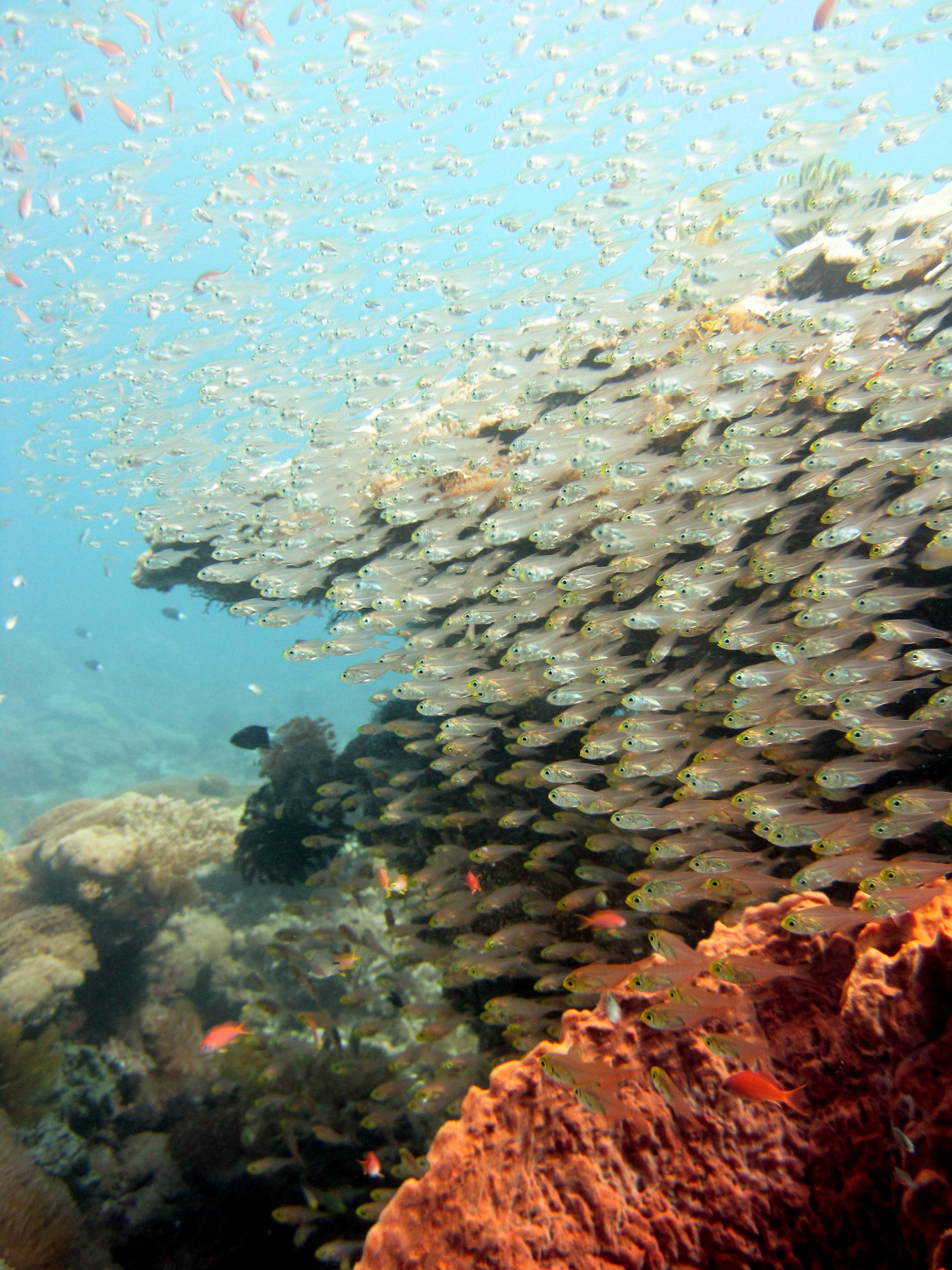
Timor-Leste Coral Reef

Timor-Leste's fauna is diverse and contains a number of endemic and threatened species. The Timor and Wetar deciduous forests region, which covers the entire island, has 38 mammal species. Timor-Leste's two endemic mammal species are the Timor shrew and the Timorese horseshoe bat. The country's and region's largest mammal, the Javan rusa, and its only native marsupial, the Northern common cuscus, are both believed to have been introduced to the island in prehistoric times by settlers from the Lesser Sunda Islands and New Guinea, respectively. Other mammals found in Timor-Leste include the Crab-eating macaque, a large number of species of bats, and the aquatic mammal, the Dugong. Timor-Leste also has its own native horse breed, the Timor pony.

Timor-Leste's terrestrial biodiversity is most visible in its native bird species. As of 2022, a total of 289 bird species are found in Timor-Leste. Significantly threatened bird species include the endangered Timor green pigeon and Wetar ground dove and the critically endangered Yellow-crested cockatoo. Timor-Leste has an endemic subspecies of the Iris lorikeet, S. i. rubripileum.

Along with the Solomon Islands, Papua New Guinea, the Philippines, Indonesia, Malaysia and Australia, Timor-Leste is one of the countries located in the Coral Triangle, the site of the most biodiverse coral reefs in the world. In particular, Atauro Island's coral reefs have been recognised as having the highest average fish biodiversity of any site surveyed, with reef sites off Atauro carrying an average of 253 different species. The highest number of species recorded from a single site in Timor-Leste was 642 different fish species, ranking second out of surveyed sites after Indonesia's Raja Ampat Islands.

Additionally, the reefs appeared to have suffered limited damage from coral bleaching and rising ocean temperatures compared to other sites in the Coral Triangle. However, despite being in relatively pristine condition, the reefs remain threatened by climate change and habitat destruction, especially blast fishing. It is believed that this has most affected large marine species such as sharks; despite the diversity of the reefs, there were a significant lack of sharks recorded in the surveys of 2016.

Timor-Leste's isolation and lack of tourism are believed to have helped preserve the reefs, as opposed to tourist-heavy locales such as Bali, where the abundance of tourism has negatively affected the health of the reefs. The Timorese government and local residents of Atauro have made attempts to preserve the reefs through education of local citizens, rejecting harmful development projects, and placing emphasis on traditional laws of preserving nature, called Tara Bandu.

=== Tree cover extent and loss ===
Global Forest Watch publishes annual estimates of tree cover loss and 2000 tree cover extent derived from time-series analysis of Landsat satellite imagery in the Global Forest Change dataset. In this framework, tree cover refers to vegetation taller than 5 m (including natural forests and tree plantations), and tree cover loss is defined as the complete removal of tree cover canopy for a given year, regardless of cause.

For Timor-Leste, country statistics report cumulative tree cover loss of 33,692 ha (336.92 km^{2}) from 2001 to 2024 (about 4.6% of its 2000 tree cover area). For tree cover density greater than 30%, country statistics report a 2000 tree cover extent of 726,235 ha (7,262.35 km^{2}). The charts and table below display this data. In simple terms, the annual loss number is the area where tree cover disappeared in that year, and the extent number shows what remains of the 2000 tree cover baseline after subtracting cumulative loss. Forest regrowth is not included in the dataset.

Annual tree cover loss in Timor-Leste, 2001–2024. View chart definition.
Tree cover extent in 2000 minus cumulative tree cover loss in Timor-Leste, 2001–2024 (loss-only residual; does not account for gain). View chart definition.

Annual tree cover extent and loss
Year	Tree cover extent (km2) (Note: This residual measure does not include forest regrowth.)	Annual tree cover loss (km2)
2001	7,255.58	6.77
2002	7,239.53	16.05
2003	7,232.62	6.91
2004	7,212.00	20.62
2005	7,198.89	13.11
2006	7,169.59	29.30
2007	7,154.02	15.57
2008	7,145.68	8.34
2009	7,119.34	26.34
2010	7,112.84	6.50
2011	7,098.20	14.64
2012	7,079.32	18.88
2013	7,074.70	4.62
2014	7,055.87	18.83
2015	7,047.24	8.63
2016	7,034.28	12.96
2017	7,017.14	17.14
2018	7,004.71	12.43
2019	6,989.70	15.01
2020	6,975.11	14.59
2021	6,960.80	14.31
2022	6,949.67	11.13
2023	6,934.89	14.78
2024	6,925.43	9.46

==== REDD+ reference level and monitoring ====
Under the UNFCCC REDD+ framework, Timor-Leste has submitted a national forest reference level (FRL). On the UNFCCC REDD+ Web Platform, the country's 2023 submission is listed as having an assessed reference level, while a national strategy, safeguards information and a national forest monitoring system are all listed as "not reported".

The first assessed FRL, submitted in 2023, covered the REDD+ activities "reducing emissions from deforestation" and "enhancement of forest carbon stocks" at national scale. Using a 2017-2021 reference period, the original submission proposed -215,868 t CO2 eq per year, revised during the technical assessment to an assessed FRL of -196,723 t CO2 eq per year. The technical assessment states that it included above-ground biomass and below-ground biomass, reported CO2 only, and used a forest definition of at least 0.5 hectares, 15 percent canopy cover, and trees of actual or potential height greater than 5 metres.
