= Lautém Municipality =

Municipality of East Timor

Lautém
- Municipality of Timor-Leste
- Município Lautém (Portuguese); Munisípiu Lautein (Tetun)
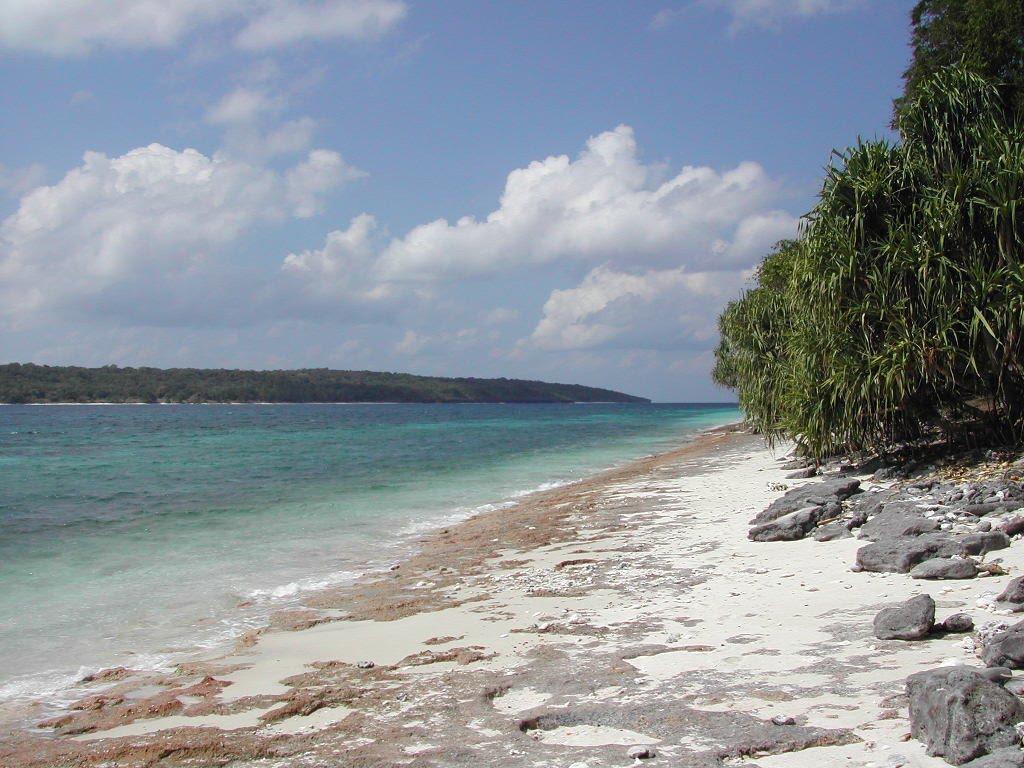
- Valu Beach, Tutuala

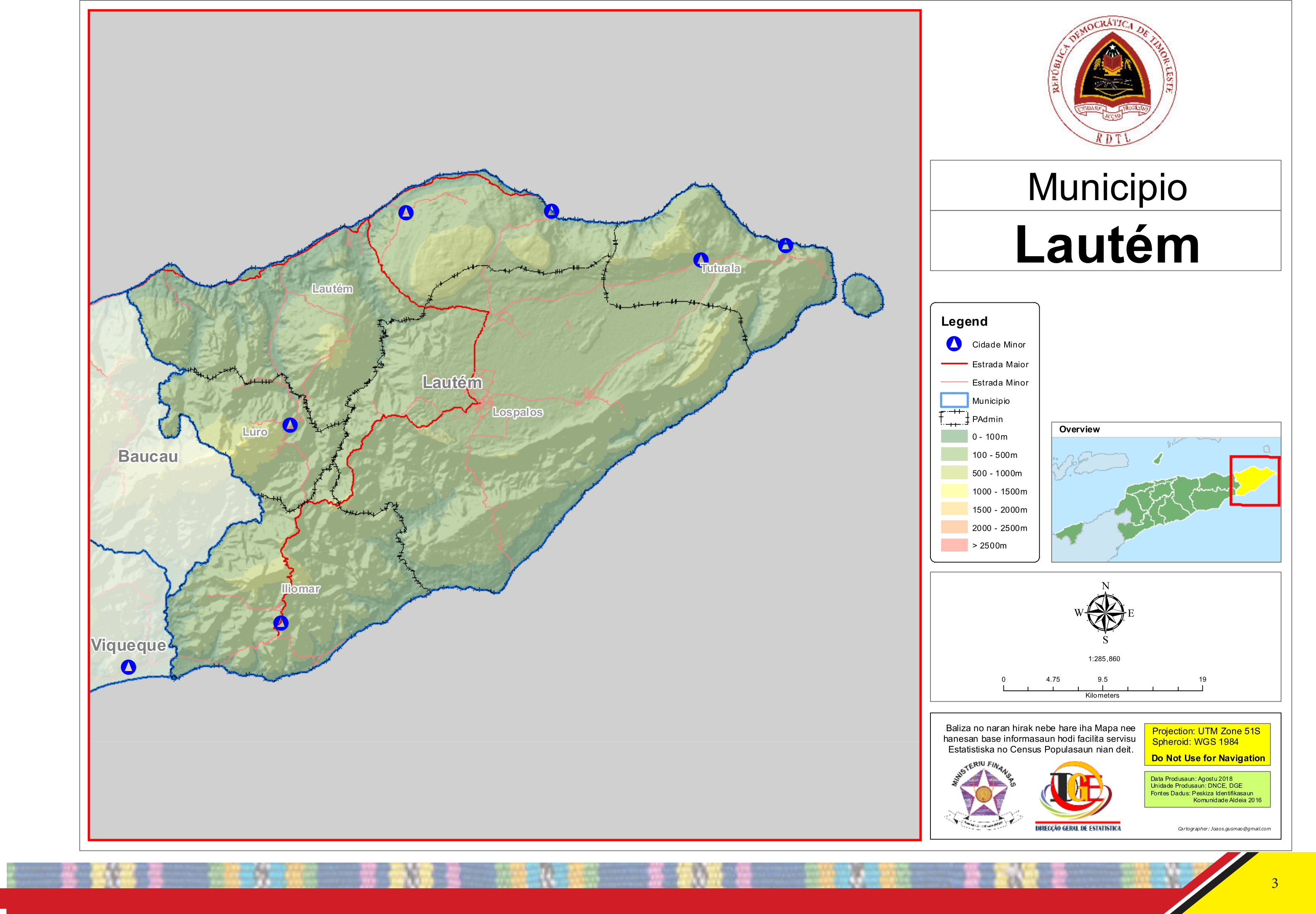
- Official map

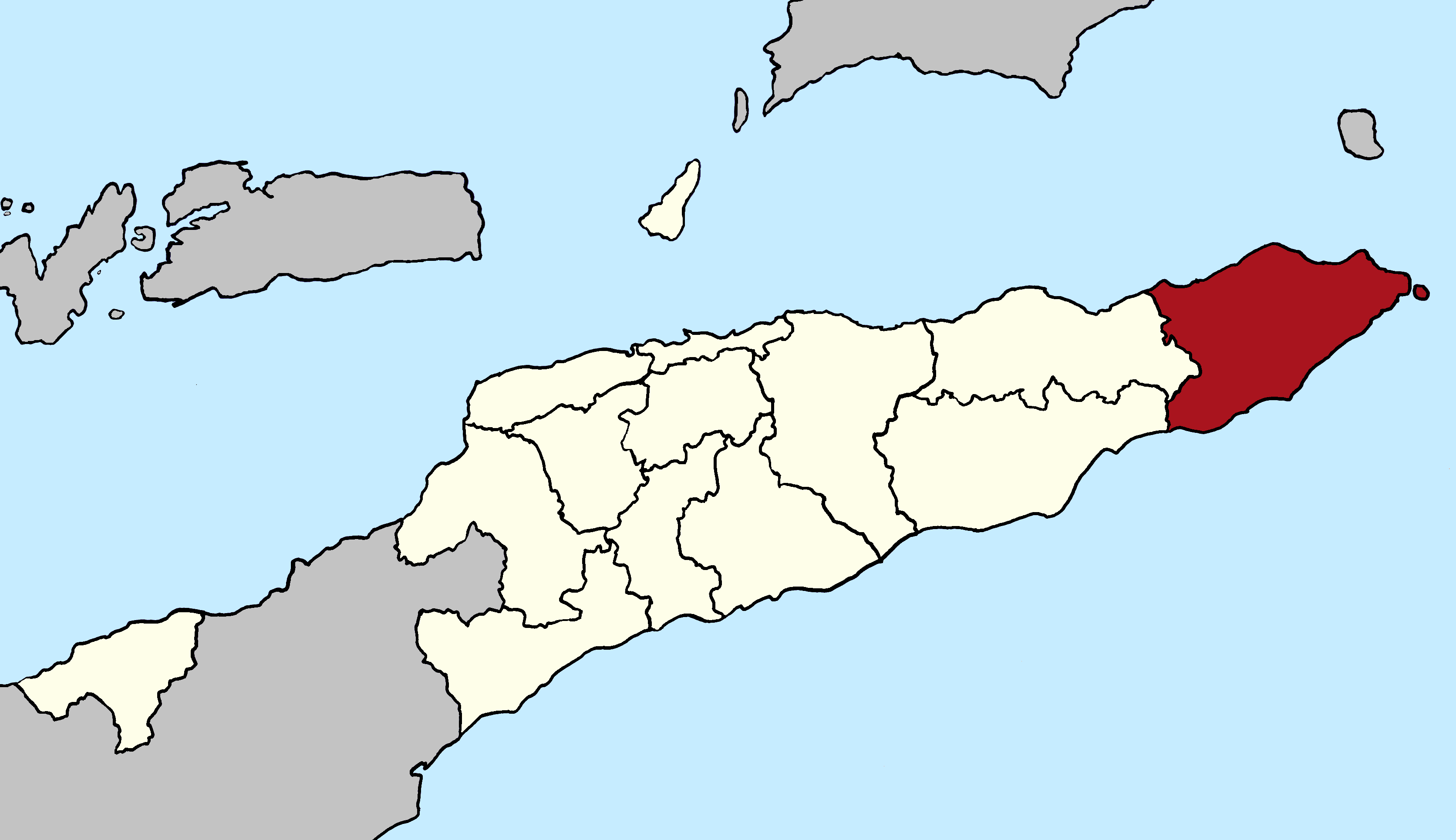
- Lautém in Timor-Leste
- Interactive map of Lautém
- Coordinates: 8°31′S 127°2′E
- Country: Timor-Leste
- Capital: Lospalos
- Administrative posts: Iliomar; Lautém; Lospalos; Luro; Tutuala

Area
  - Total: 1,816.7 km^{2} (701.4 sq mi)
  - Rank: 3rd

Population (2015 census)
  - Total: 65,240
  - Rank: 7th
  - Density: 35.91/km^{2} (93.01/sq mi)
  - Rank: 12th

Households (2015 census)
  - Total: 12,050
  - Rank: 7th
- Time zone: UTC+09:00 (TLT)
- ISO 3166 code: TL-LA
- HDI (2017): 0.607 medium · 7th
- Website: Lautém Municipality

Lautém (Portuguese: Município Lautém, Tetun: Munisípiu Lautein) is one of the municipalities (formerly districts) of Timor-Leste, at the eastern end of the country. It has a population of 64,135 (2010 census) and an area of 1,813 square kilometres (700 sq mi). Its capital is Lospalos, which lies 248 kilometres (154 mi) east of the national capital, Dili.

== Toponymy ==
The word Lautém is a Portuguese approximation of the local Fataluku language word Lauteinu. That word, in turn, is a portmanteau of the Fataluku words lau ('cloth') and tein ('sacred'), ie 'sacred cloth'. The mythical ancestors of today's municipal population were known as Lauteinu or Lauteira.

== Geography ==
To the west the municipality borders the municipalities of Baucau and Viqueque. To the north lies the Banda Sea, and to the south the Timor Sea. The municipality also includes the easternmost point of the island, Cape Cutcha in the administrative post of Tutuala, and the small island Jaco.

The borders of the municipality of Lautém are identical to those of the council of the same name in Portuguese Timor. At that time, many of the localities had Portuguese names, such as Vila Nova de Malaca (today Lautém), Nova Nazaré (Com), Nova Sagres (Tutuala) and Nova Âncora (Laivai).

Lautém has beautiful sand beaches and a wild, mountainous, and rugged unspoilt landscape. Many of the endemic birds of Timor-Leste live here. Near the city of Lautém there are cave drawings. Numerous stone sarcophagi and animistic shrines are found throughout the district. There is also a fossilized lagoon called Lua Ira, known among locals for its crystal-clear, blue-green waters. It is a 10-minute drive from the village of Com, a popular tourist area on the coast.

Lautém municipality is known for its birding. Its municipal flag has the head of a yellow-crested cockatoo.

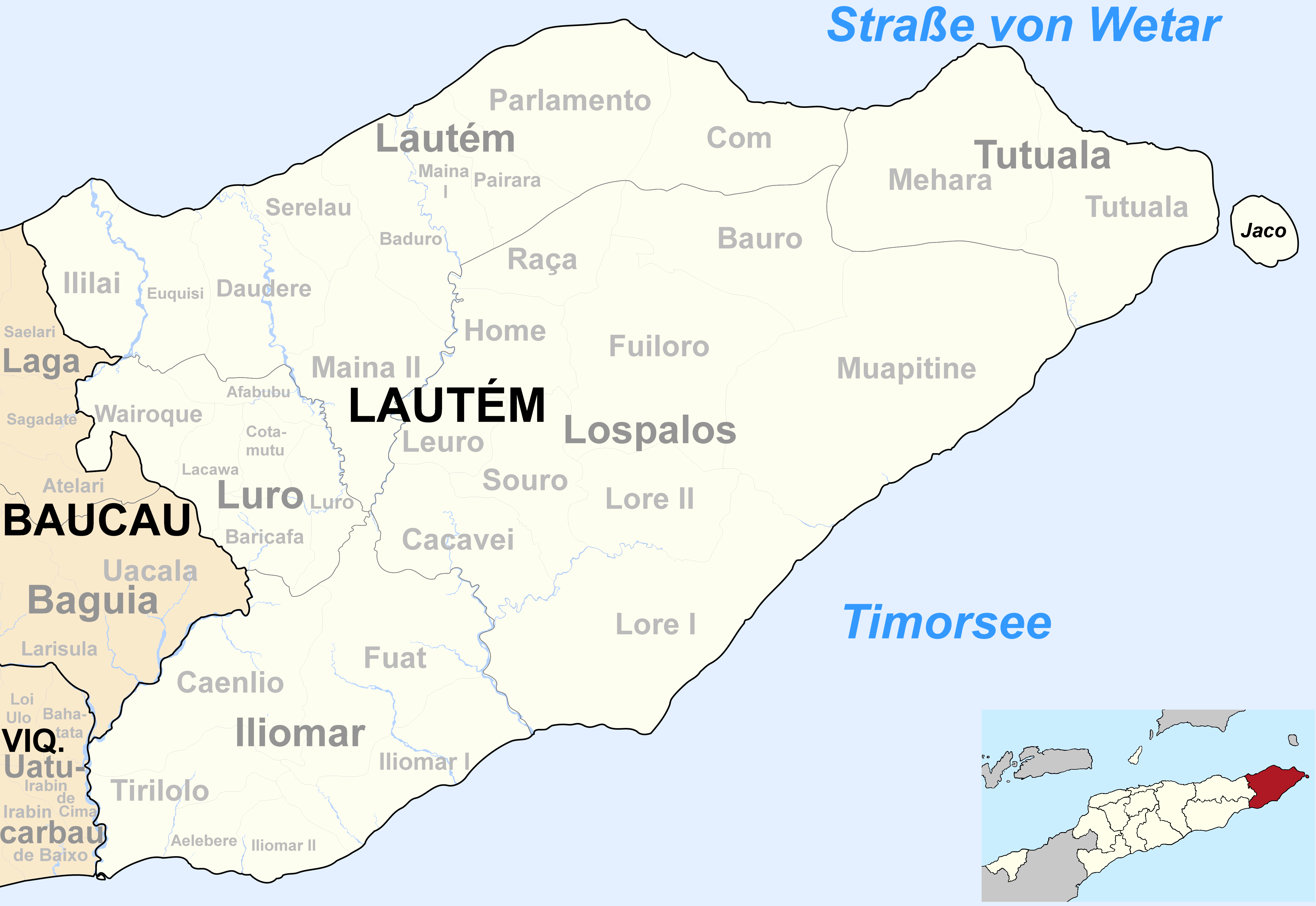
Administrative posts and sucos of Lautém

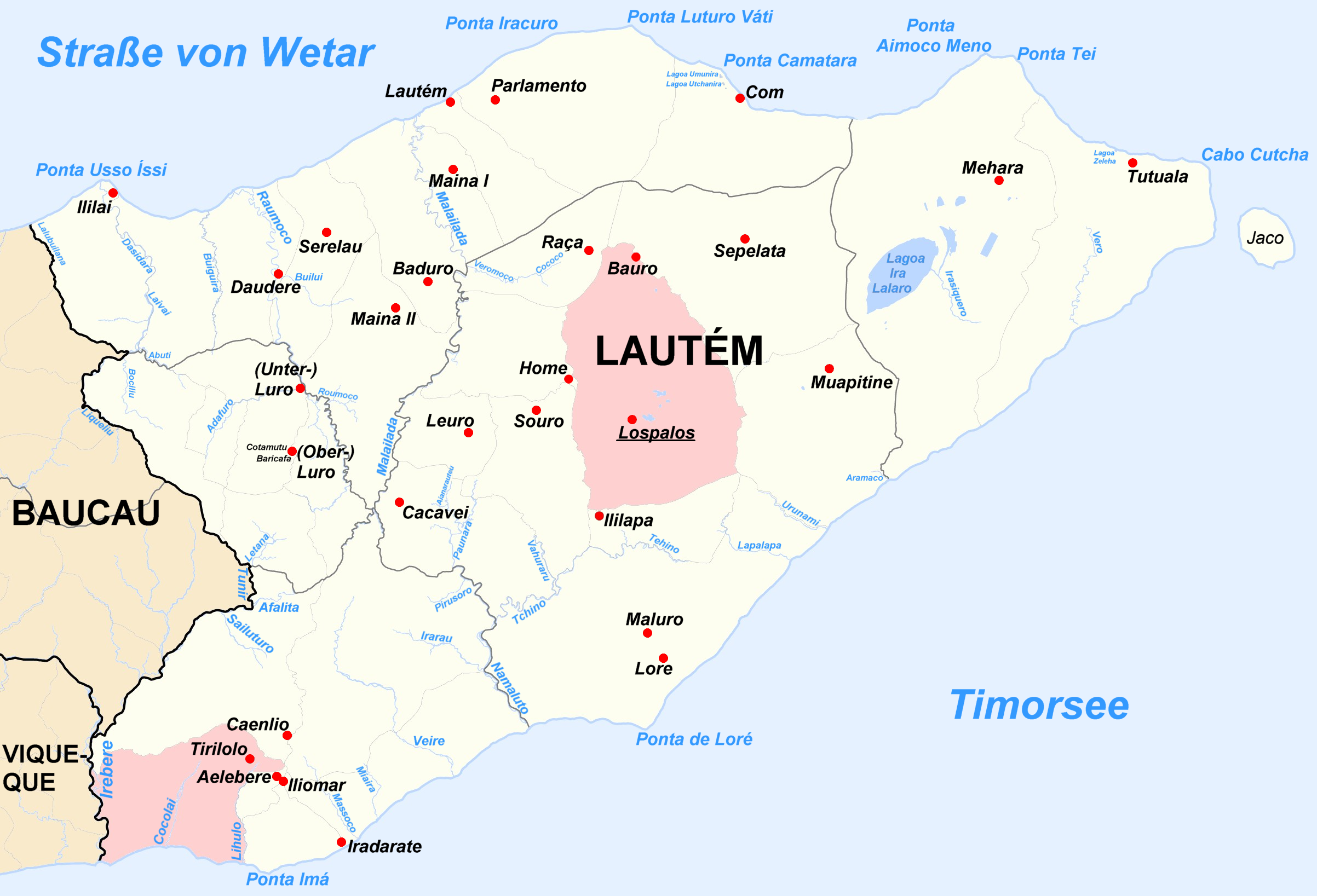
Cities and rivers in Lautém
