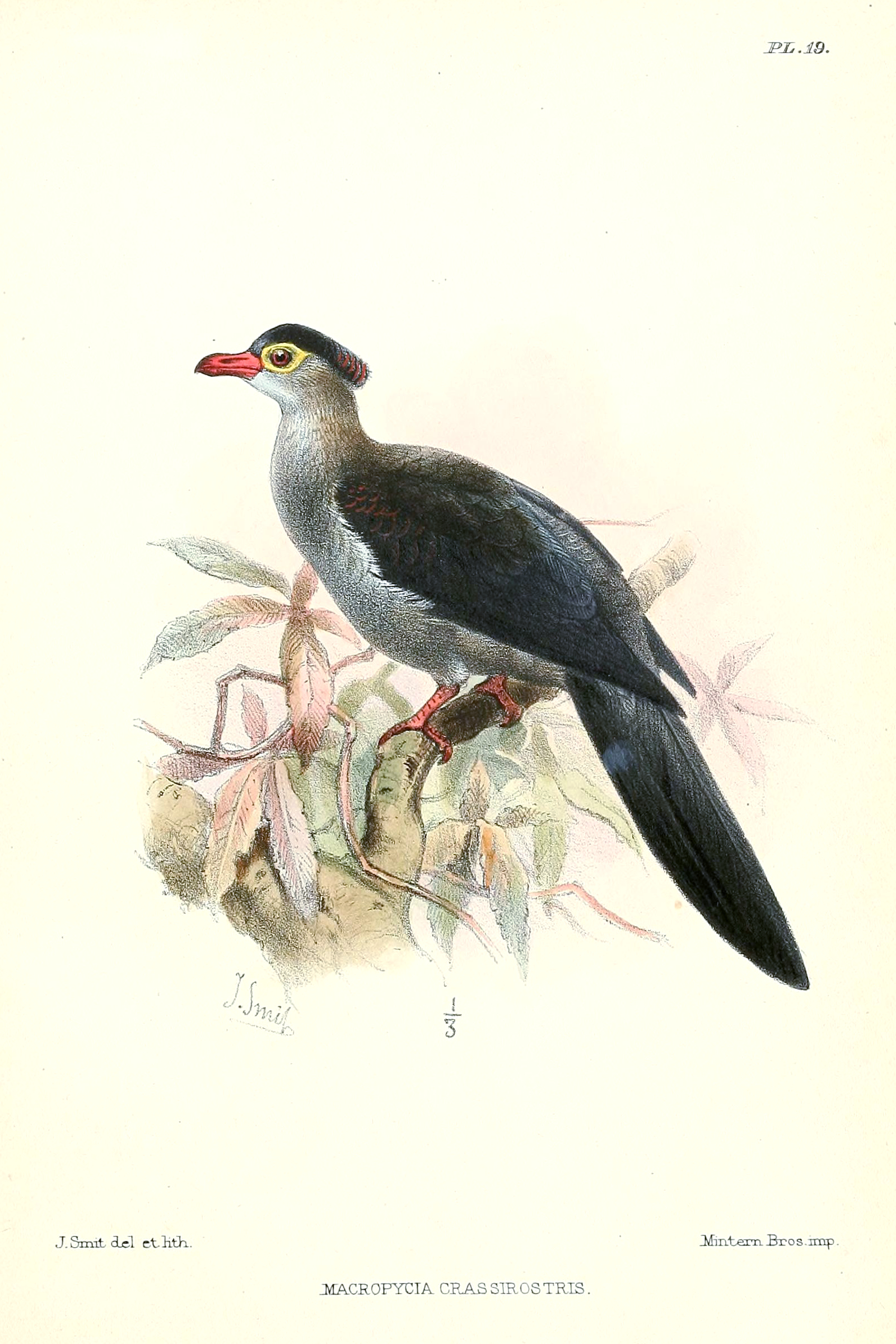

Conservation status
- Least Concern (IUCN 3.1)

Scientific classification
- Kingdom: Animalia
- Phylum: Chordata
- Class: Aves
- Order: Columbiformes
- Family: Columbidae
- Genus: Reinwardtoena
- Species: R. crassirostris

Binomial name
- Reinwardtoena crassirostris (Gould, 1856)

Synonyms
- Turacoena crassirostris Gould, 1856; Coryphoenas crassirostris (Gould, 1856); Macropygia crassirostris (Gould, 1856)

= Crested cuckoo-dove =

Species of bird

The crested cuckoo-dove (Reinwardtoena crassirostris) is a species of bird in the pigeon family, Columbidae. First described by English zoologist John Gould in 1856, it is endemic to the Solomon Islands archipelago, where it mainly inhabits hill forests at elevations of 500–900 m (1,600–3,000 ft). It is a large and robust pigeon, with a length of 40–42 cm (16–17 in) and a distinctive pale purplish-grey crest. Adults are mainly bluish-grey, with a pale greyish-buff throat, blackish tail, and yellow-tipped reddish bill. Both sexes look alike. Juveniles lack the crest, have darker heads, and have duller wings.

The species feeds on fruit in the canopy and is usually seen alone or in pairs. The only known nest was found in November 1995 on an inaccessible cliff. Nests contain a single egg, which is incubated by both parents. The dove is listed as being near threatened on the IUCN Red List due to its presumed moderately small population, which is thought to be declining due to widespread deforestation in lowland forests across the species's range.

== Taxonomy and systematics ==
The crested cuckoo-dove was originally described in 1856 as Turacoena crassirostris by the English ornithologist John Gould on the basis of a specimen from Guadalcanal in the Solomon Islands. It was first moved to the genus Reinwardtoena by the Italian zoologist Tommaso Salvadori in 1876, although other authors subsequently placed the species as the only species in the genus Coryphoenas. The generic name Reinwardtoena is in honour of the Dutch naturalist Caspar Reinwardt, combining his name with the Ancient Greek word οἶνος (oinas), meaning 'pigeon'. The specific name crassirostris is from the Latin words crassus, meaning 'thick', and rostris, meaning '-billed'. Crested cuckoo-dove is the official common name designated by the International Ornithologists' Union. Other English common names for the species include crested pigeon and crested long-tailed pigeon. In the Duke language of Kolombangara, it is known as ngumúlu.

The crested cuckoo-dove is one of three species in the genus Reinwardtoena. It is rather distinct from the other two species in its genus and was formerly placed in its own genus, Coryphoenas, before being lumped back into Reinwardtoena by the British ornithologist Derek Goodwin in 1983. It does not have any subspecies.

== Description ==
The crested cuckoo-dove is a large and robust pigeon, with a length of 40–42 cm (16–17 in). Its most prominent feature is the long, pale purplish-grey crest made by the hairy-textured feathers on the top of the head and back of the neck. This crest is held up at an angle of 45 degrees when the pigeons perch. The head is pale purplish-grey and the throat is pale greyish-buff, turning bluish-grey towards the breast and neck. The underparts, upper back, and wings are darker bluish-black, and the tail is blackish. In some birds, the breast and underparts have a light yellowish-brown tinge. The rectrices (outer tail feathers) have a pale grey band across their base, widest in the outermost feathers. The iris is yellow and surrounded by a ring of red orbital skin. The bill is reddish and tipped yellow, with a strongly hooked mandible, while the legs are red. Adults of both sexes look alike. Juveniles lack the crest, have darker heads, and duller wings, as well as rust-coloured edges to most of their feathers.

Although the species is fairly distinctive, it may be confused with some other species. In flight, the crest is held flat and is hard to see; consequently, the pale mountain pigeon may be mistaken for the crested cuckoo-dove when seen poorly in flight. The mountain pigeon lacks a crest and has a thinner beak, longer wings, a shorter tail, and scaled upperparts. The crested cuckoo-dove is also sometimes confused with the extinct Choiseul pigeon; the two species are extremely different in appearance, but both possess crests. Misidentifications of the cuckoo-dove have led to several claims of the Choiseul pigeon's continued existence.

=== Vocalisations ===
The species's advertising call is a mournful, whistling wha...whuaaw...wha...whuaaw (also described as a hoo-woooahha): the first note rises in pitch, and the second note is more drawn-out and slurred, first rising before falling and trailing off. The call is far-carrying and does not differ much across its range. A call similar to the advertising call is made by the male when displaying to the female; males move their head forward slowly while giving each call. Vocalisations are sometimes made while perched on a high branch in canopy.

== Distribution and habitat ==
The crested cuckoo-dove is endemic to the Solomon Islands archipelago, where it is found in valleys on the islands of Bougainville, Choiseul, Santa Isabel, Kolombangara, New Georgia, Vangunu, Nggatokae, Rendova, Guadalcanal, Malaita, Makira, Three Sisters, and Ugi. It inhabits forests, secondary growth, and forest edge on steep hills and in lowlands, preferring hill forests at elevations of 500–900 m (1,600–3,000 ft). It usually occurs at elevations of up to 1,100 m (3,600 ft), but is found up to 1,500 m (4,900 ft) on Guadalcanal. It is thought to be migratory, although this has not been confirmed.

== Behaviour and ecology ==
The crested cuckoo-dove occurs either alone or in pairs. Its flight is fast and direct. It feeds on fruit, such as those from the genera Osmoxylon and Schefflera. It usually forages in the canopy, but occasionally comes down to the ground to feed. The breeding biology of this pigeon is very poorly known. The only known nest was found in November 1995 on an inaccessible cliff next to a river on Choiseul Island and was made primarily of twigs. Nests contain a single egg, which is incubated by both parents.

== Status ==
The crested cuckoo-dove is listed as being Least Concern by the International Union for Conservation of Nature (IUCN) on the IUCN Red List. It is mostly uncommon throughout its range and occurs in low densities, but its abundance varies in different regions and it can locally be common. It is widespread on Santa Isabel, fairly common on Kolombangara, Guadalcanal and San Cristobal, and rare on Bougainville. Its population has not been determined, but is believed to be moderately small and declining, primarily due to widespread deforestation in lowland forests across the species' range. Populations in lowlands are thought to be decreasing rapidly, but those in more hilly regions are likely only declining slowly. Hunting is also a threat to the species, although its impact on the population is thought to be minor.
