= Clarenbach =

Clarenbach is a surname. Notable people with the surname include:

- Kathryn F. Clarenbach (1920–1994), early leader of the modern feminist
- David Clarenbach (born 1953), Wisconsin Democratic politician
- Adolf Clarenbach (c. 1497 – 1529), burnt at the stake in Cologne, died as one of the first Protestant martyrs of the Reformation
