= The Impossible Itself =

- Directed by: Jacob Adams
- Produced by: Jacob Adams; Alan Mandell
- Cinematography: Jacob Adams
- Edited by: Jacob Adams; Tony Noel
- Music by: Art Pepper; Laurie Pepper
- Release date: February 14, 2010
- Running time: 60 minutes
- Country: United States
- Language: English

The Impossible Itself is a 2010 documentary film produced and directed by Jacob Adams, covering the 1957 San Francisco Actor's Workshop production of the Samuel Beckett stage play Waiting For Godot that was taken to San Quentin Prison and performed before its inmates, with an examination of an earlier incarnation of Godot as performed by inmates at the Luttringhausen Prison in Germany in 1953.

== Background ==
Adams was 20 when he began working to raise the money to create the film. During filming, Adams travelled to Germany in 2000 and interviewed former Prison Pastor Hans Freitag about the performances.

== Synopsis ==
The film documents the 1957 San Francisco Actor's Workshop production of Samuel Beckett's play Waiting For Godot which was performed live before inmates at San Quentin Prison. The film also examines a 1953 performance of Godot by inmates at the Luttringhausen Prison in Germany, providing new scholarship material on those performances.

== Cast ==
The documentary features interviews with former S.F. Actor's Workshop members Herbert Blau, Alan Mandell, Eugene Roche, Robert Symonds, Robin Wagner, Joseph Miksak, Tony Miksak, and David Irving as well as former prison inmates Rick Cluchey, Ed Reed, Professor John Irwin and Prison Recreation Supervisor Clem Swagerty.

== Release ==
The documentary qualified for Academy Award consideration as a documentary short subject in 2008.

After 2008, the film was lengthened and distribution began in 2010, finding a home in such universities as Stanford, Duke, Berkeley, UNC, USC, Kansas State and many others.

It was presented at an Honorarium by Professor David Lloyd of USC.
