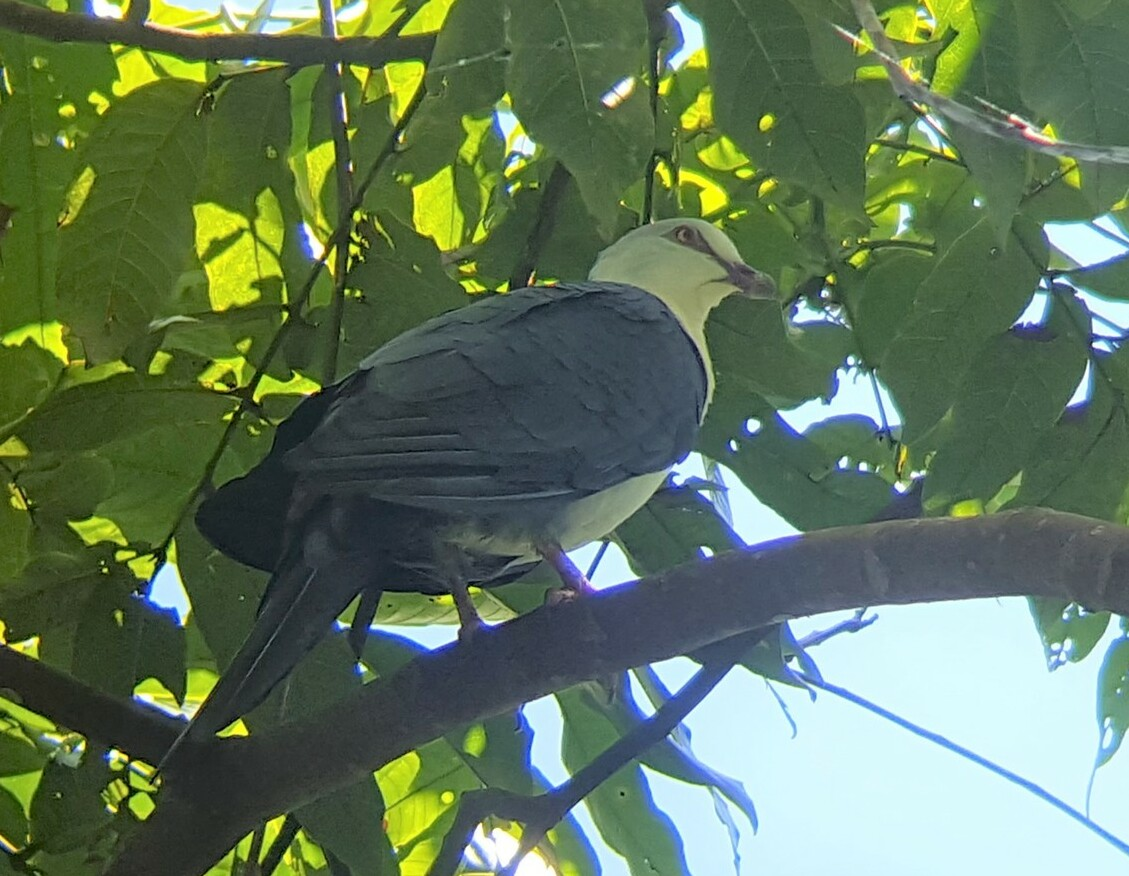

Conservation status
- Near Threatened (IUCN 3.1)

Scientific classification
- Kingdom: Animalia
- Phylum: Chordata
- Class: Aves
- Order: Columbiformes
- Family: Columbidae
- Genus: Reinwardtoena
- Species: R. browni

Binomial name
- Reinwardtoena browni (Sclater, P. L., 1877)

Synonyms
- Macropygia browni Sclater, P. L., 1877; Reinwardtoena browni solitaria Salomonsen, F., 1972

= Pied cuckoo-dove =

Species of bird

The pied cuckoo-dove (Reinwardtoena browni) is a species of bird in the pigeon family, Columbidae. First described by English zoologist Philip Sclater in 1877, it is endemic to the Bismarck Archipelago, where it mainly inhabits lowland and hill forests at elevations of up to 1,000 m (3,300 ft). It is a large, distinctive pigeon, with a length of 40–46 cm (16–18 in) and a weight of 279–325 g (9.8–11.5 oz). Adults are mainly black and white. The heads and underparts are whitish, while the wings, tails, and upperparts are black. Both sexes look alike. Juveniles are mainly sooty-grey in colour.

The species is usually seen alone or in pairs and usually rather hard-to-find. It feeds on fruit. The only known nest was found in May 1930 and was a simple structure made of twigs on rocky terrain near a stream and contained a single white egg. The dove's population is estimated to number 15,000–30,000 total birds; it is listed as being near threatened on the IUCN Red List due to a decline in its population caused by deforestation in the lowland forests it inhabits. Some studies have found that the species is moderately tolerant of habitat degradation and have suggested that it be categorised as being of least concern.

== Taxonomy and systematics ==
The pied cuckoo-dove was originally described in 1877 as Macropygia browni by the English zoologist Philip Sclater on the basis of a specimen from Duke of York Island in Papua New Guinea. It was first moved to the genus Reinwardtoena by the Italian ornithologist Tommaso Salvadori in 1882. The generic name Reinwardtoena is in honour of the Dutch naturalist Caspar Reinwardt, combining his name with the Ancient Greek word oinas, meaning "pigeon". The specific name browni is in honour of the Scottish missionary George Brown. Pied cuckoo-dove is the official common name designated by the International Ornithologists' Union. Other English common names for the species include Brown's cuckoo-dove, Brown's long-tailed pigeon, black-and-white long-tailed pigeon, and grey long-tailed pigeon.

The pied cuckoo-dove is one of three species in the genus Reinwardtoena. It is very similar in appearance to the great cuckoo-dove and the two are sometimes considered allospecies—species with geographically separated populations that can be considered part of the same species complex. It does not have any currently recognized subspecies, but populations from the Admiralty Islands have in the past been treated as a distinct subspecies, R. b. solitaria. Birds from Umboi Island may represent a distinct, currently unnamed subspecies.

== Description ==
The pied cuckoo-dove is a large and long-tailed pigeon, with a length of 40–46 cm (16–18 in) and a weight of 279–325 g (9.8–11.5 oz). The forehead and face are greyish-white, changing to silvery-grey towards the top of the head and hindneck. The neck is paler silvery-grey, darkest where it meets the upper back. The upper back, back, rump, tail, and wings are all blackish, with the wings and central tail feathers being a glossy blue-black. The rectrices are patterned with grey, and the outer three tail feathers have a somewhat indistinct grey band across the middle. The underparts are white from the throat to the belly, turning dark bluish-grey towards the undertail-coverts and flanks. The iris is red or yellow, and the bill is grey or brown with a reddish base. The feet are dark red. Adults of both sexes look alike. Juveniles are mainly sooty-grey in colour, with no hints of warm brown in their plumage.

Due to its distinctive black-and-white colouration, this species is unlikely to be confused with any other pigeons that share its range, but is very similar to the closely related great cuckoo-dove. It differs from that species in its shorter tail and the absence of chestnut-brown in its plumage.

=== Vocalisations ===
The species's advertising call is a far-carrying series of notes; it starts with a short note, then has a long mournful note rising in pitch, and ends with two low-pitched notes, the second of which is the deepest in the call.

== Distribution and habitat ==
The pied cuckoo-dove is endemic to the Bismarck Archipelago, where it is found on the islands of New Britain, New Ireland, New Hanover, Umboi, Lolobau, Duke of York, Lihir, Tabar and Watom, as well as Manus, Rambutyo and Nauna in the Admiralty Islands. It inhabits rainforest and coastal scrub in lowlands and hills at elevations of up to 1,000 m (3,300 ft). It prefers tall forests and is commonest in hills, often being absent from some lowland areas. It is somewhat tolerant of moderately degraded forest, but does not inhabit heavily degraded forests with little canopy cover.

== Behaviour and ecology ==
The pied cuckoo-dove is rather hard to find and is usually seen either alone or in pairs in the midstorey or canopy of the forest. Roosting occurs low inside the forest, occasionally on exposed branches and vines. It feeds on fruits such as berries.

The breeding biology of this pigeon is very poorly known. Courtship displays have been seen from March to May on New Hanover, in July on Dyaul, and in August on New Britain. The only known nest was a simple structure made of twigs, found in May 1930 on a ledge overhanging a stream flowing through rocky terrain on the island of New Britain. Nests contain a single white egg, which only the female has been observed incubating. Eggs are ovoid and are 34.71 mm × 25.03 mm (1.367 in × 0.985 in) in dimension.

== Conservation ==
The pied cuckoo-dove is listed as being near threatened by the International Union for Conservation of Nature (IUCN) on the IUCN Red List. The species is generally uncommon throughout its range and has an estimated population of 15,000–30,000 total birds, of which 10,000–19,999 are estimated to be adults. It is mainly threatened by high levels of logging, although hunting may also present a threat. It was previously considered to be of least concern as the decline in its population was not thought to be high enough for a threatened listing, but was raised to near-threatened in 2008 following estimates of a more rapid fall in its population caused by intense deforestation in lowland forests throughout its range. More recent studies have found that the species is moderately tolerant of habitat degradation and have suggested that it be categorised as being of least concern again.
