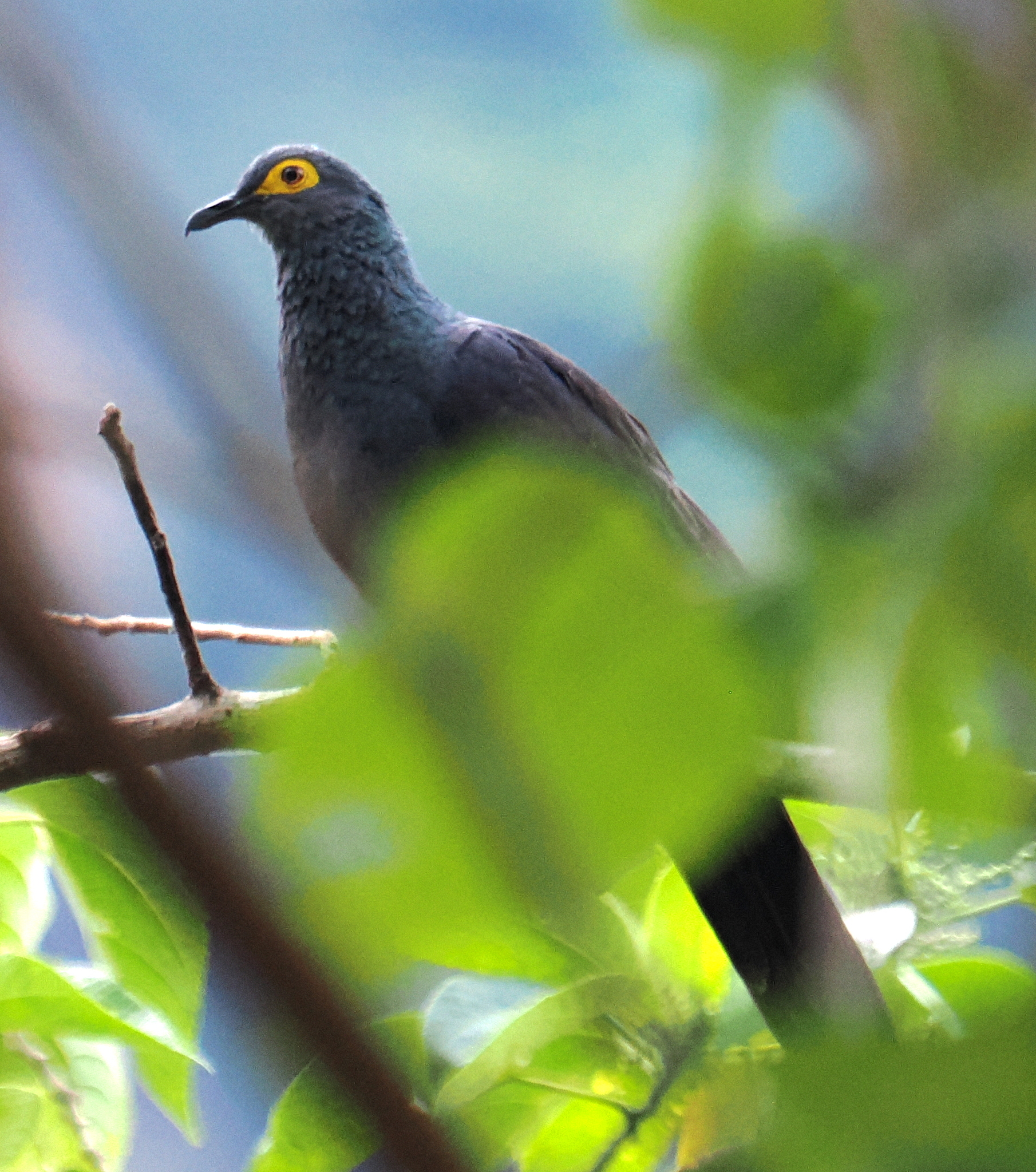

Conservation status
- Near Threatened (IUCN 3.1)

Scientific classification
- Kingdom: Animalia
- Phylum: Chordata
- Class: Aves
- Order: Columbiformes
- Family: Columbidae
- Genus: Turacoena
- Species: T. modesta

Binomial name
- Turacoena modesta (Temminck, 1835)
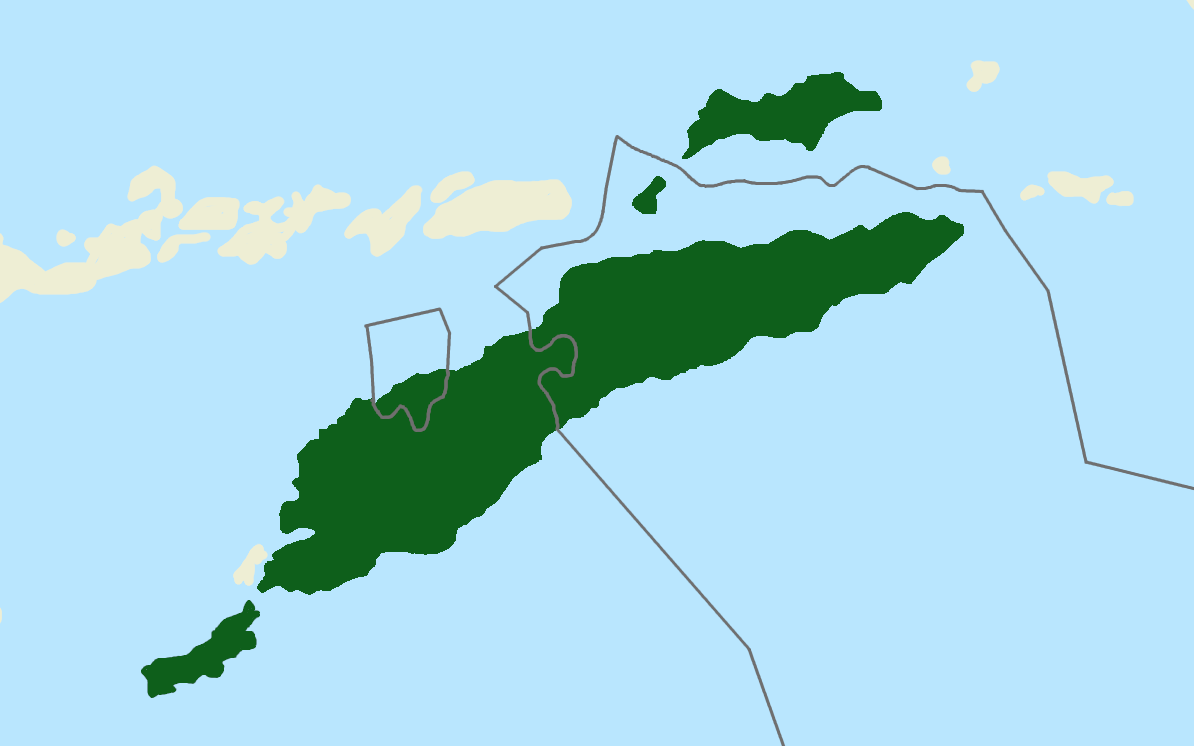

Synonyms
- Columba modesta; Macropygia modesta; Turtur modestus; Haploenas modesta

= Black cuckoo-dove =

Species of bird from the Lesser Sunda Islands

The black cuckoo-dove or black dove (Turacoena modesta), also known as the slaty cuckoo dove, is a species of bird in the family Columbidae. It is endemic to the Lesser Sunda Islands, being found on Timor, Wetar, Rote, and Atauro. It inhabits primary and secondary monsoon forest, eucalyptus forest, and woodlands. It is 38.5 cm (15.2 in) long on average and is mainly dark bluish-gray, lighter on the head and underparts and darker on the wings and tail. It has yellow orbital skin.

The black cuckoo-dove feeds on fruit. It is listed as being near threatened by the International Union for Conservation of Nature (IUCN) in the IUCN Red List. It is threatened by habitat destruction and hunting.

== Taxonomy and systematics ==
The black cuckoo-dove was first described as Columba modesta by the Dutch zoologist Coenraad Temminck in 1835 based on a specimen from Timor. It was then moved to the genus Macropygia by the English zoologist George Robert Gray in 1844, before finally being moved to Turacoena in 1856. The name of the genus, Turacoena, is after the genus Turacus (now treated as a synonym of Tauraco) and the Ancient Greek word oinas, meaning pigeon. The specific name modesta is from the Latin word modestus, meaning plain or modest. Black cuckoo-dove is the official common name designated by the International Ornithologists' Union. Other common names for the species include black dove, Timor cuckoo-dove, Timor black cuckoo-dove, Timor black pigeon, and slate-colored cuckoo-dove.

The black cuckoo-dove is one of three species in the genus Turacoena and is most closely related to the white-faced cuckoo-dove. It does not have any subspecies.

== Description ==
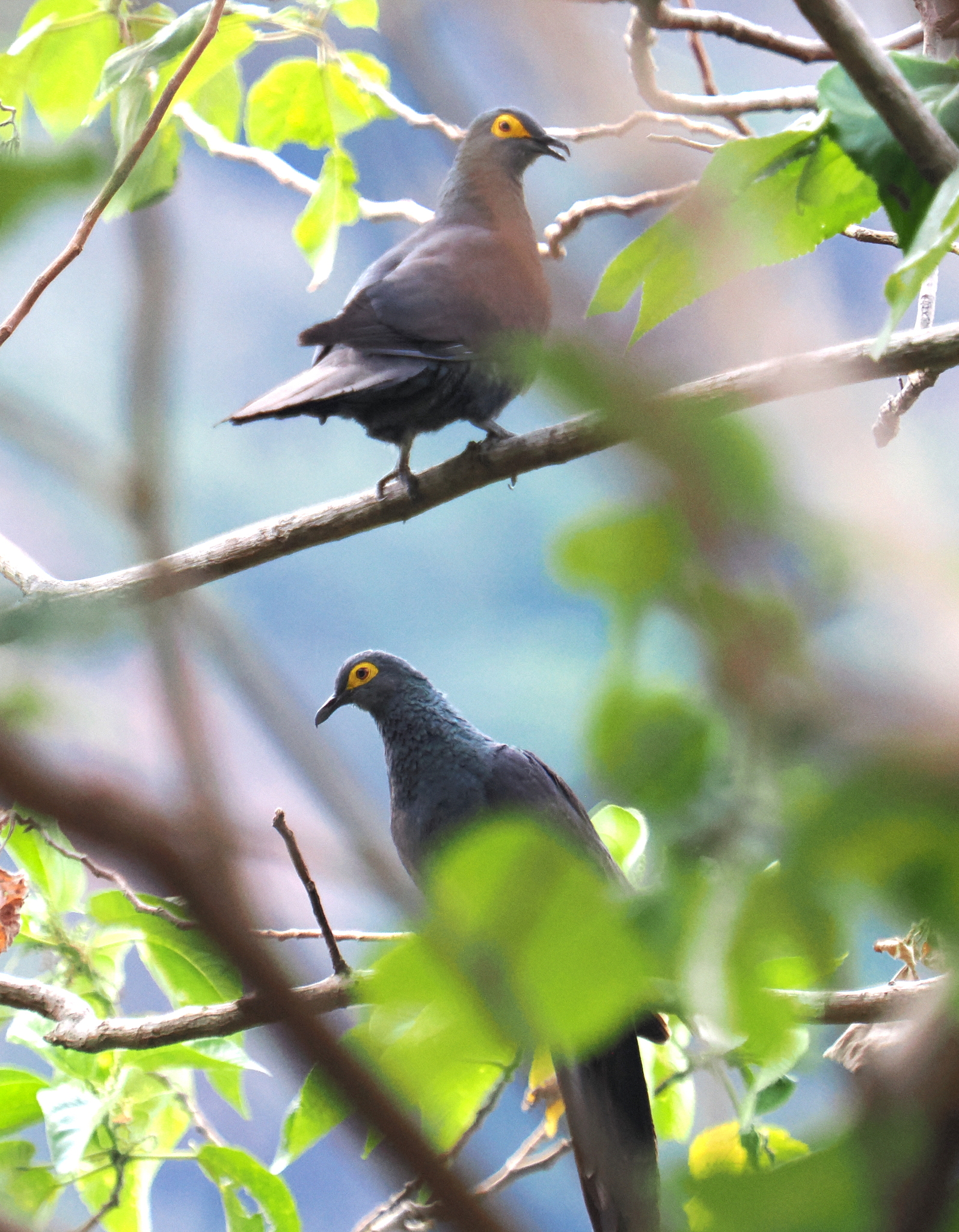
On Wetar

The black cuckoo-dove is a medium-sized cuckoo-dove with a length of 38.5–42 cm (15.2–16.5 in). Both sexes are similar in appearance. It is mainly dark bluish-gray, with the color being lighter on the head and underparts and almost black on the wings and tail. The feathers on the top of the head, nape, neck, breast and upper back have iridescent green or purple fringes. The orbital skin is yellow, while the iris has a yellow inner ring and a red outer ring. The legs and beak are black. Juveniles are duller, with brownish-grey plumage, and have light fawn-white fringes to feathers.

=== Vocalizations ===
The advertising call is a long crrruah...crrruah..rrah.rah.ra.ra.ra-ra-ra-r-r-r-r which starts with purrs that are similar to those of the European turtle dove and then becomes a series of stuttering notes before fading. It lasts for 6–8 seconds and consists of 20–25 notes. It is repeated around every half minute.

== Distribution and habitat ==
The black cuckoo-dove is endemic to the Lesser Sunda Islands and is found on Timor, Wetar, Rote, and Atauro. It inhabits primary and secondary monsoon forest, eucalyptus forest, and woodland at elevations of up to 1,770 m (5,810 ft) and is moderately tolerant of habitat destruction. It is thought to migrate seasonally depending on food availability.

== Behaviour and ecology ==
The black cuckoo-dove is mainly found singly or in pairs in the subcanopy. It is a quiet species and flies swiftly to nearby perches when flushed. It feeds on fruit and forages singly or in pairs in bushes and small trees. Flocks also congregate at fruiting trees. It is parasitized by the quill mite Meitingsunes turacoenas, which is present on its flight feathers.

== Status ==
The species is listed as being near threatened by the International Union for Conservation of Nature (IUCN) in the IUCN Red List due to population declines and restricted distribution. Its population is estimated to be 1,500–7,000 mature adults and 2,500–9,999 total individuals. Threats to the species include severe deforestation caused by grazing, burning, agriculture, and logging. It is also threatened by intensive hunting in Timor.
