= Hugo Paul =

Hugo Paul may refer to:

- Hugo Paul (officer), recipient of the Knight's Cross of the Iron Cross
- Hugo Paul (politician) (1905–1962), German politician (KPD)
