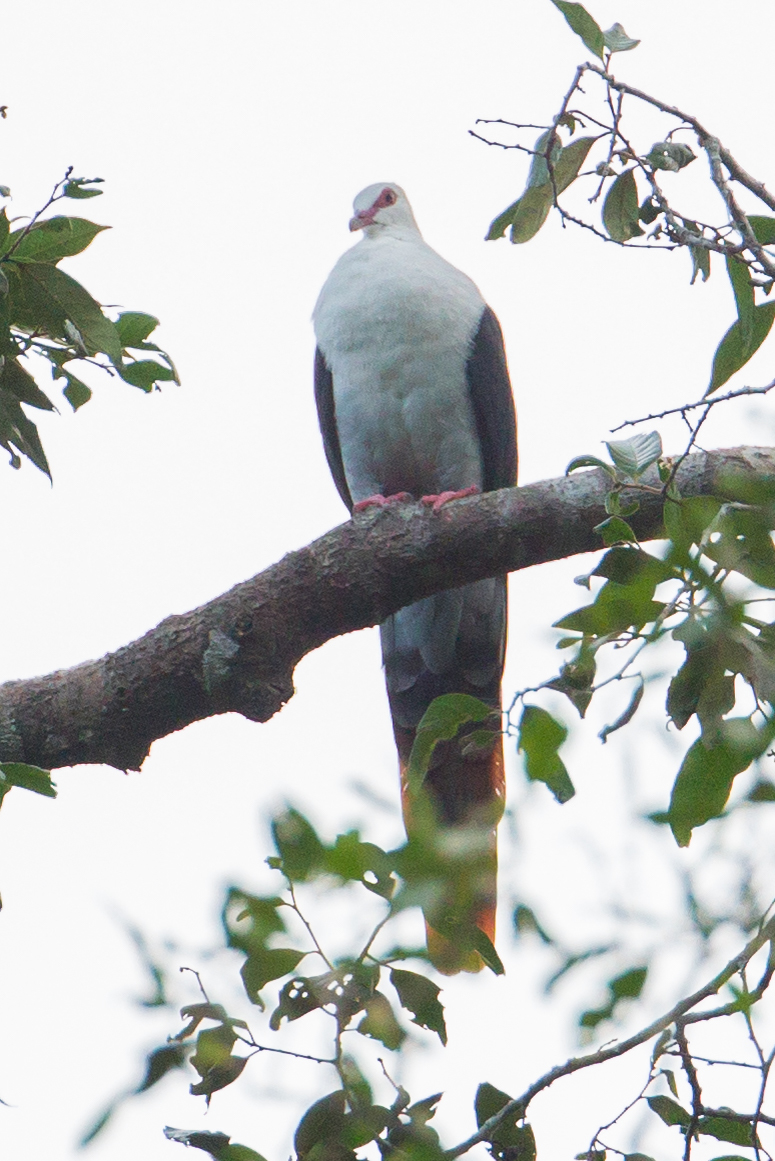
- Reinwardtoena reinwardti

Scientific classification
- Kingdom: Animalia
- Phylum: Chordata
- Class: Aves
- Order: Columbiformes
- Family: Columbidae
- Tribe: Columbini
- Genus: Reinwardtoena; Bonaparte, 1854

Type species
- Reinwardtoena typica Bonaparte, 1854

Species
- See text

= Reinwardtoena =

Genus of birds

Reinwardtoena is a small genus of doves in the family Columbidae. They are found on parts of Indonesia, Papua New Guinea and the Solomon Islands.

== Taxonomy ==
The type species of Reinwardtoena, the great cuckoo-dove, was originally described in 1824 as Columba reinwardtsi (later emended to reinwardtii) by the Dutch zoologist Coenraad Jacob Temminck on the basis of a specimen from Ambon Island, Indonesia, although Temminck erroneously stated that specimen came from Sulawesi. In 1854, the French ornithologist Charles Lucien Bonaparte created the genus Reinwardtoena for the species, referring to it as Reinwardtoena typica. The crested cuckoo-dove, originally described in 1856 as Turacoena crassirostris by the English ornithologist John Gould, was moved to this genus by the Italian zoologist Tommaso Salvadori in 1876. The pied cuckoo-dove, described in 1877 as Macropygia browni by the English zoologist Philip Sclater, was reassigned to Reinwardtoena by Salvadori in 1882.

The generic name Reinwardtoena is in honour of the Dutch naturalist Caspar Reinwardt, combining his name with the Ancient Greek word οἶνος (oinas), meaning 'pigeon'. In English, pigeons of this genus are known as cuckoo-doves, a name they share with species of the genera Macropygia and Turacoena.

The genus contains three species. The great and pied cuckoo-doves are very similar in appearance despite having disjunct ranges and are considered allospecies. However, the crested cuckoo-dove has rather distinctive morphological and vocal traits. Consequently, some authors in the past placed it in its own genus, Coryphoenas, although this arrangement is no longer recognized. The three species are:

- Great cuckoo-dove, Reinwardtoena reinwardti
- Pied cuckoo-dove, Reinwardtoena browni
- Crested cuckoo-dove, Reinwardtoena crassirostris

== Description ==
All three Reinwardtoena species are large, thick-billed, long-tailed pigeons, with average lengths ranging from 42–47 cm (17–19 in). They are generally similar to Macropygia doves in their build, but differ in their pale heads and underparts, thicker bills, and the absence of barring on their bodies. The great and pied cuckoo-doves have similar plumages, with greyish-white heads and underparts and chestnut-brown or blackish upperparts. The crested cuckoo-dove is more unique in its appearance, with mainly bluish-grey plumage, a distinctive pale purplish-grey crest, pale greyish-buff throat, blackish tail, and yellow-tipped reddish bill.

== Distribution and habitat ==
Reinwardtoena doves are natives of Wallacea, Papua, and nearby archipelagos, from the Maluku Islands east through mainland Papua to the Bismarck Archipelago and Solomon Islands. They inhabit primary rainforest, secondary forest, forest edge, and coastal scrub. Although generally found at a wide range of elevations, they are commonest in the highlands and mountains throughout their range.

== Conservation ==
All three cuckoo-doves in the genus are generally uncommon birds in their range, although they can be locally common in areas of suitable habitat. The great and crested cuckoo-doves are considered to be of least concern by the International Union for Conservation of Nature. The pied cuckoo-dove was previously considered to be of least concern, but was raised to a near-threatened listing in 2008 following estimates of a more rapid fall in its population caused by intense deforestation in lowland forests throughout its range. In 2018, its population was estimated to be 15,000–30,000 total birds, of which 10,000–19,999 are estimated to be adults. More recent studies have found that the species is moderately tolerant of habitat degradation and have suggested that it be categorised as being of least concern again.
