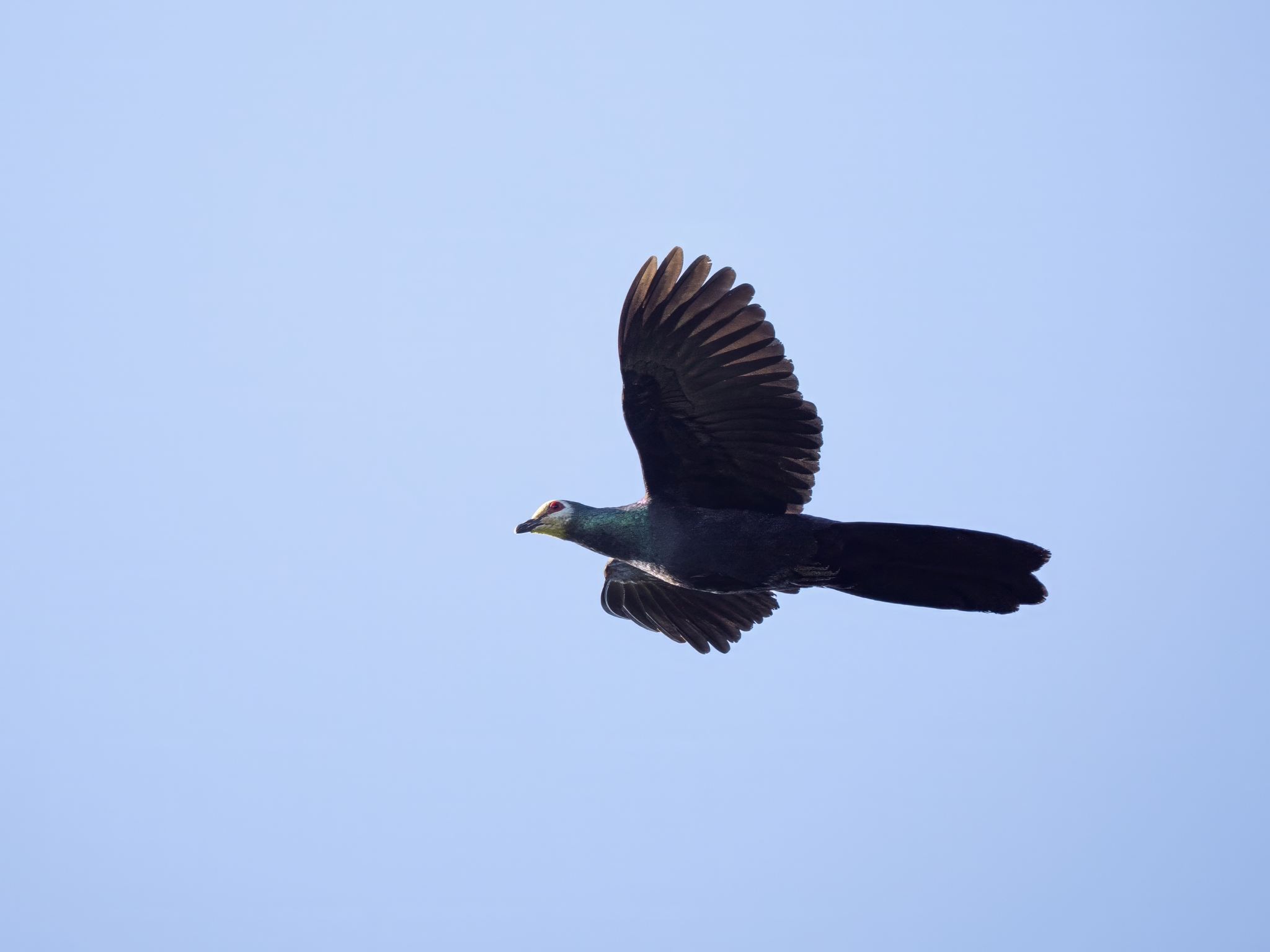

Conservation status
- Least Concern (IUCN 3.1)

Scientific classification
- Kingdom: Animalia
- Phylum: Chordata
- Class: Aves
- Order: Columbiformes
- Family: Columbidae
- Genus: Turacoena
- Species: T. sulaensis

Binomial name
- Turacoena sulaensis Forbes & Robinson, 1900

Synonyms
- Turacoena manadensis sulaensis

= Sula cuckoo-dove =

Species of bird

The Sula cuckoo-dove (Turacoena sulaensis), is a species of bird in the family Columbidae. It is endemic to the Sula Islands and the Banggai Archipelago in Indonesia. Prior to 2016, it was considered a subspecies of the white-faced cuckoo dove.
