= Maria Eckertz =

German activist and politician (1899–1969)

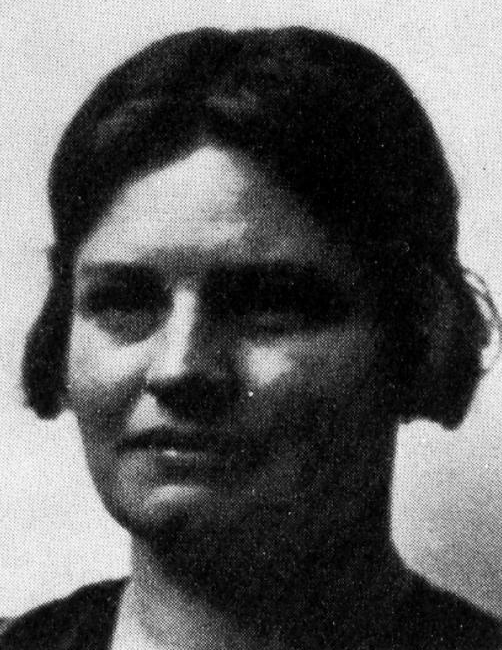
Eckertz c. 1932

Maria Eckertz (née Flerlage; 21 December 1899 – 19 December 1969) was a German activist and politician (KPD). She took part in anti-Nazi resistance and narrowly avoided death in Ravensbrück concentration camp.

She briefly sat as a member of the Prussian regional parliament ("Landtag") in 1932/33 and, again briefly, in 1946, as a Cologne city councillor.

== Life ==
Maria Flerlage was born in Hamburg. Her father, Theodor Flerlage, was chief secretary of the post office's telegraphy department. Maria attended school at a Catholic lyceum for seven years and then took a job with the Hamburg telephone company, where she worked for two years. In 1921 she married the middle school teacher Theodor Eckertz (1896 – 1984), which involved relocating to Cologne.

In 1927, Maria Eckartz joined the Communist Party of Germany (KPD). She was active in the women's section of the Cologne region party, and was also elected on to the regional executive of Red Aid ("Rote Hilfe"), a workers' welfare organisation with close links to the party.

Between 1932 and March 1933, she sat as a KPD member of the Prussian regional parliament ("Landtag"), representing the Cologne-Aachen electoral district. However, in January 1933 the Nazis took power and converted Germany into a one-party dictatorship. In the space of a couple of months political activity (except in support of the Nazi party) became illegal. Maria was arrested in April and held in "protective custody" till 15 August 1934. Her husband Theodor was also arrested and, in June 1934, sentenced to a three-year prison term for "preparing to commit high treason". He suffered serious mistreatment while he was locked away.

After her release from protective custody in the late summer of 1933, Maria Eckertz lived on welfare support. In 1936 she was arrested on two occasions in the context of mass roundups undertaken in Cologne, but on each occasion she was released on grounds of "insufficient evidence". Between 1937 and 1939 she was able to obtain work in the textiles industry in Cologne. Her husband emerged from custody, in the end, in 1938 after four and a half years in detention and the two of them resumed "resistance work", though available sources are unclear as to what this involved. The Gestapo kept them under close surveillance and received precise reports on their work, also sending "spies" to their home. There are nevertheless reports of contacts involving the communist resistance cell centred on Hugo Paul.

Theodore Eckertz was re-arrested in 1939. Maria Eckertz took work as a bookkeeper. She was re-arrested in August 1944, during the course of Aktion Gitter, which targeted people recorded for left-wing political activity, which came in the wake of the failed assassination attempt against Adolf Hitler, and taken to Ravensbrück concentration camp. On 25 April 1945 she was able to join a "transport" of 4,000 Polish Ravensbrück inmates, transferred in Red Cross buses to Sweden on the basis of the larger deal struck between Count Bernadotte and the government of the crumbling Nazi state. The transfer to Sweden enabled her to survive the concentration camp.

War ended in May 1945, by which time Maria Eckert was badly ill with tuberculosis. She could be returned to Germany only in March 1946, delivered initially to Berlin and from there returning to Cologne where she was briefly installed as a city councillor (Stadtverordneterin). However, her return to politics was short lived. She died in Cologne on 17 December 1969.
