= Peter Fliesteden =

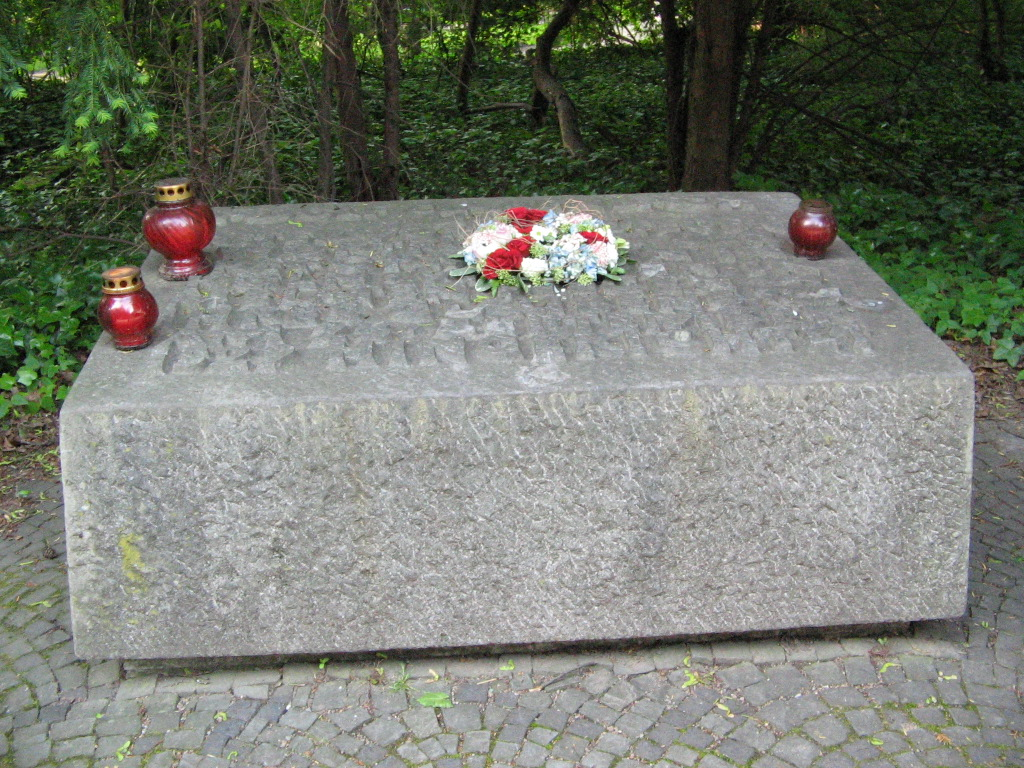
Memorial stone for Adolf Clarenbach and Peter Fliesteden in the Melaten-Friedhof

Peter Fliesteden (date of birth unknown; died 28 September 1529) was condemned to be burnt at the stake at Melaten near Cologne, as one of the first Protestant martyrs of the Reformation on the Lower Rhine in Germany. He was born in a tiny place also called Fliesteden (now part of Bergheim, Rhein-Erft-Kreis) on an unknown date.

== Arrest ==
In December 1527, a cathedral priest reported that, during the Mass at the elevation of the host, he covered his head, turned his back on it and spat. Fliesteden arrested immediately outside the Cologne Cathedral and taken to the prison in the Frankenturm. After long interrogations he was condemned as a "radical Protestant", because he rejected "the duty of confession in church, the vows of the orders, the priesthood and above all the presence of Christ in the sacraments of the Eucharist and the veneration of the sacrament."

=== Martyrdom ===
He was condemned to be burnt at the stake at Melaten near Cologne on 28 September 1529 with another Protestant, Adolf Clarenbach, but died before he could be fastened to the stake, when the executioner, in an attempt to make him keep quiet, pulled on the chain round his throat too tight.

The present Melaten Burial Ground (Melaten-Friedhof) now stands near the site and contains a memorial to both Clarenbach and Fliesteden.

== Sources ==
- J. F. Gerhard Goeters: Studien zur niederrheinischen Reformationsgeschichte; Pulheim: Verein für rheinische Kirchengeschichte, 2002; ISBN 3-7927-1830-8
- Hermann Keussen (1896). "Vliesteden, Peter". Allgemeine Deutsche Biographie (in German). Vol. 40. Leipzig: Duncker & Humblot. pp. 90–91.
- Wilhelm Rahe (1961). "Fliesteden, Peter". Neue Deutsche Biographie (in German). Vol. 5. Berlin: Duncker & Humblot. p. 247. (full text online).
