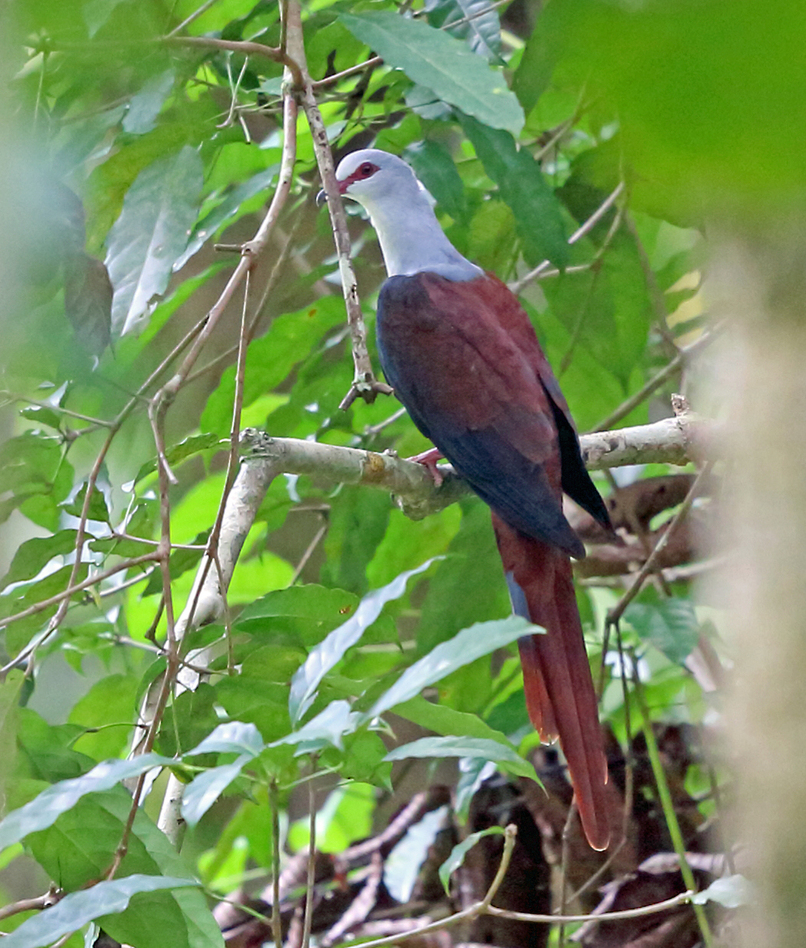
- R. r. reinwardti

Conservation status
- Least Concern (IUCN 3.1)

Scientific classification
- Kingdom: Animalia
- Phylum: Chordata
- Class: Aves
- Order: Columbiformes
- Family: Columbidae
- Genus: Reinwardtoena
- Species: R. reinwardti

Binomial name
- Reinwardtoena reinwardti (Temminck, 1824)
- Range (year-round)

Synonyms
- List: Columba reinwardtsi Temminck, 1824; Macropygia reinwardtii (Temminck, 1824); Reinwardtoena typica Bonaparte, 1854; Reinwardtoena reinwardtsi (Temminck, 1824); Turacoena reinwardtii (Temminck, 1824); Ectopistes reinwardtii (Temminck, 1824); Turtur reinwardtii (Temminck, 1824); Coccyzoenas reinwardtii (Temminck, 1824); Reinwardtoena reinwardtii obiensis Hartert, EJO, 1898; Reinwardtoena reinwardtii albida Hartert, EJO, 1900

= Great cuckoo-dove =

Species of bird

The great cuckoo-dove (Reinwardtoena reinwardti) is a species of bird in the pigeon family, Columbidae. First described by the Dutch zoologist Coenraad Jacob Temminck in 1824, it is found on New Guinea, several surrounding islands, and Wallacea, where it mainly inhabits primary forest and the forest edge. It is a large, distinctive pigeon, with a length of 47.5–52.5 cm (18.7–20.7 in) and a weight of 208–305 g (7.3–10.8 oz). In adults, the head, neck, and breast are whitish or blue-grey, the underparts are pale bluish-grey, the upperparts are chestnut-brown, and the outer wings are black. Females differ from males in having more yellowish irises and duller orbital skin. Juveniles are mainly dull grey-brown, with dirty-white throats and bellies.

The species feeds on fruit and seeds. It is usually seen alone or in pairs, but forms flocks with other frugivorous birds at fruit trees. It is known to defend fruiting shrubs it is feeding on, an uncommon foraging behaviour among birds. Breeding occurs throughout the year and varies in different parts of its range, seemingly peaking from October to December on New Guinea. Nests are flat or slightly concave platforms made of sticks, moss, roots, and ferns, and contain a single white egg. The species is classified as being of least concern by the International Union for Conservation of Nature due to its sufficiently large range and stable population.

== Taxonomy and systematics ==
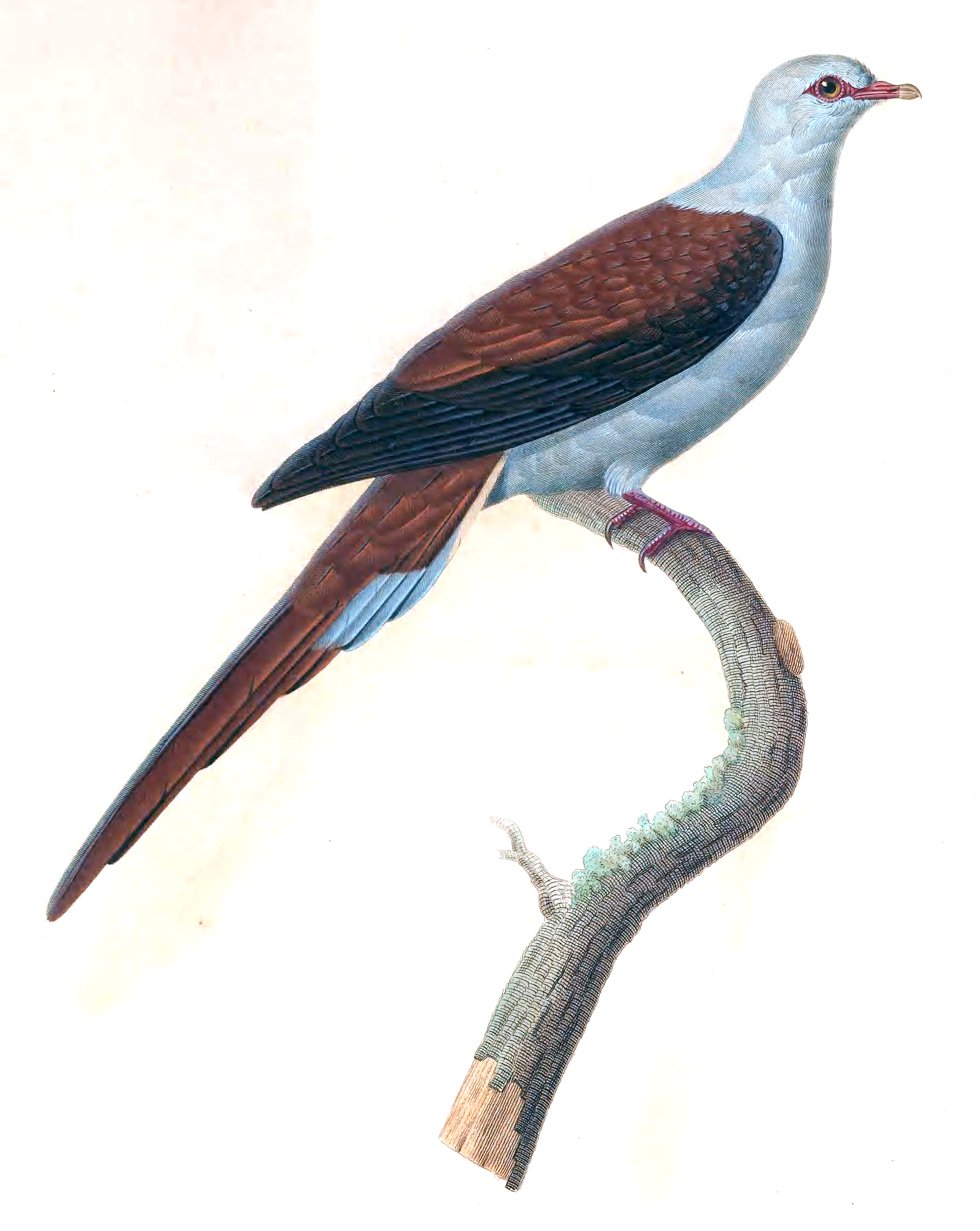
Illustration by Pauline Rifer de Courcelles, ca 1845

The great cuckoo-dove was originally described in 1824 as Columba reinwardtsi by the Dutch zoologist Coenraad Jacob Temminck on the basis of a specimen from Ambon Island, Indonesia, although Temminck erroneously stated that specimen came from Sulawesi. The spelling reinwardtsi was a misprint for reinwardtii, and Temminck himself used the latter spelling in his table of contents; however, other authors have emended the name to reinwardti, and both of these spellings are currently used.

In 1854, the French ornithologist Charles Lucien Bonaparte created the genus Reinwardtoena for the species, referring to it as Reinwardtoena typica. Both the generic and specific names are in honour of the Dutch naturalist Caspar Reinwardt. Great cuckoo-dove is the official common name designated by the International Ornithologists' Union (IOU). Other English common names for the species include long-tailed cuckoo-dove, Reinwardt's cuckoo-dove, giant cuckoo-dove, Reinwardt's long-tailed pigeon, chestnut-and-grey pigeon, and maroon-and-grey pigeon. In the Sansundi language of Biak Island, it is known as Man Wupu.

The great cuckoo-dove is one of three species in the genus Reinwardtoena in the pigeon family, Columbidae. It is very similar in appearance to the pied cuckoo-dove (Reinwardtoena browni) and the two are sometimes considered allospecies—species with geographically separated populations that can be considered part of the same species complex. It currently has three subspecies recognised by the IOU; some authors also recognise populations from Buru and Obi as distinct subspecies albida and obiensis, respectively. The subspecies recognised by the IOU are:

- R. r. reinwardti (Temminck, 1824): The nominate subspecies, it is found on Morotai, Halmahera, Kayoa, Bacan, Obi, Buru, Ambon, Seram and Seram Laut in the Maluku Islands.
- R. r. griseotincta Hartert, EJO, 1896: Found on New Guinea and its surrounding islands, except for Biak and the Louisiade Archipelago. Larger and darker than the nominate, with the white coloration confined to the forehead, face, and throat.
- R. r. brevis Peters, JL, 1937: Found on Biak and Supiori. It is smaller and paler than the other subspecies and may represent a distinct species.

== Description ==
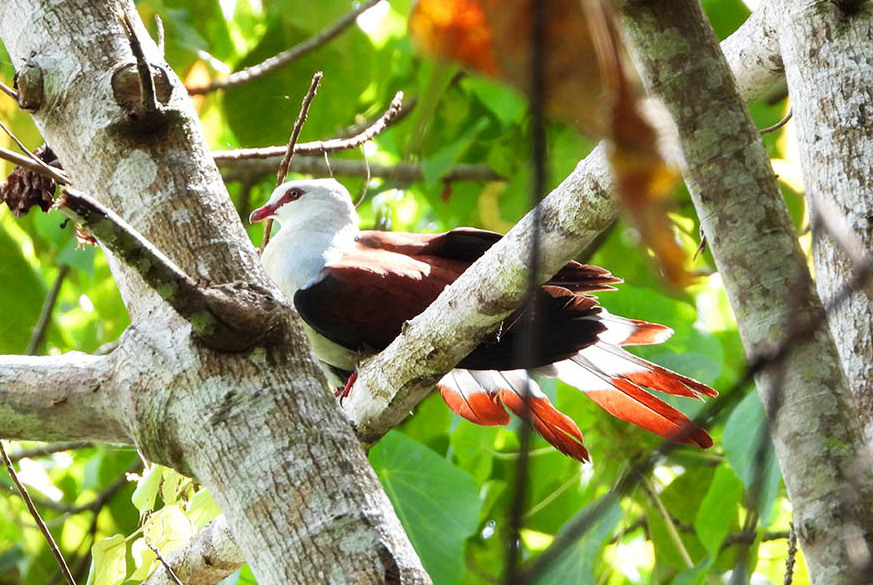
R. r. griseotincta

The great cuckoo-dove is a large and long-tailed pigeon, with a length of 47.5–52.5 cm (18.7–20.7 in) and a weight of 208–305 g (7.3–10.8 oz). A slight crest on the back of the head gives it a "big-headed" appearance. Birds of the nominate subspecies have the head, neck, and breast blue-grey or cream-white with a pale bluish-grey tinge, turning purplish grey on the back of the neck and upper back. The throat and belly are white, with the latter frequently having a pinkish tinge. The mantle, back, rump, and uppertail-coverts are chestnut-brown. The wings are darker chestnut-maroon, becoming blackish further from the body, and are black below. The underparts are pale bluish-grey.

The outermost rectrices (tail feathers) are greyish-white with black bases and black stripes near the end, while the second-outermost are coloured similarly with black-and-chestnut stripes. The amount of chestnut increases moving inwards, with the central rectrices being almost entirely chestnut with only a small amount of black and grey near the base. Individuals of the nominate subspecies vary clinally (in a gradient across their geographic distribution) in appearance, being darkest in the north and palest in the southwest of their range. In males, the iris is yellowish-white with a red outer ring, and the orbital skin is reddish. Females have a more yellowish iris and duller orbital skin. In both sexes, the cere and base of the bill are red to purplish-pink, and the rest of the bill is yellowish-brown, sometimes with a white tip. The feet are pink to purplish-red.

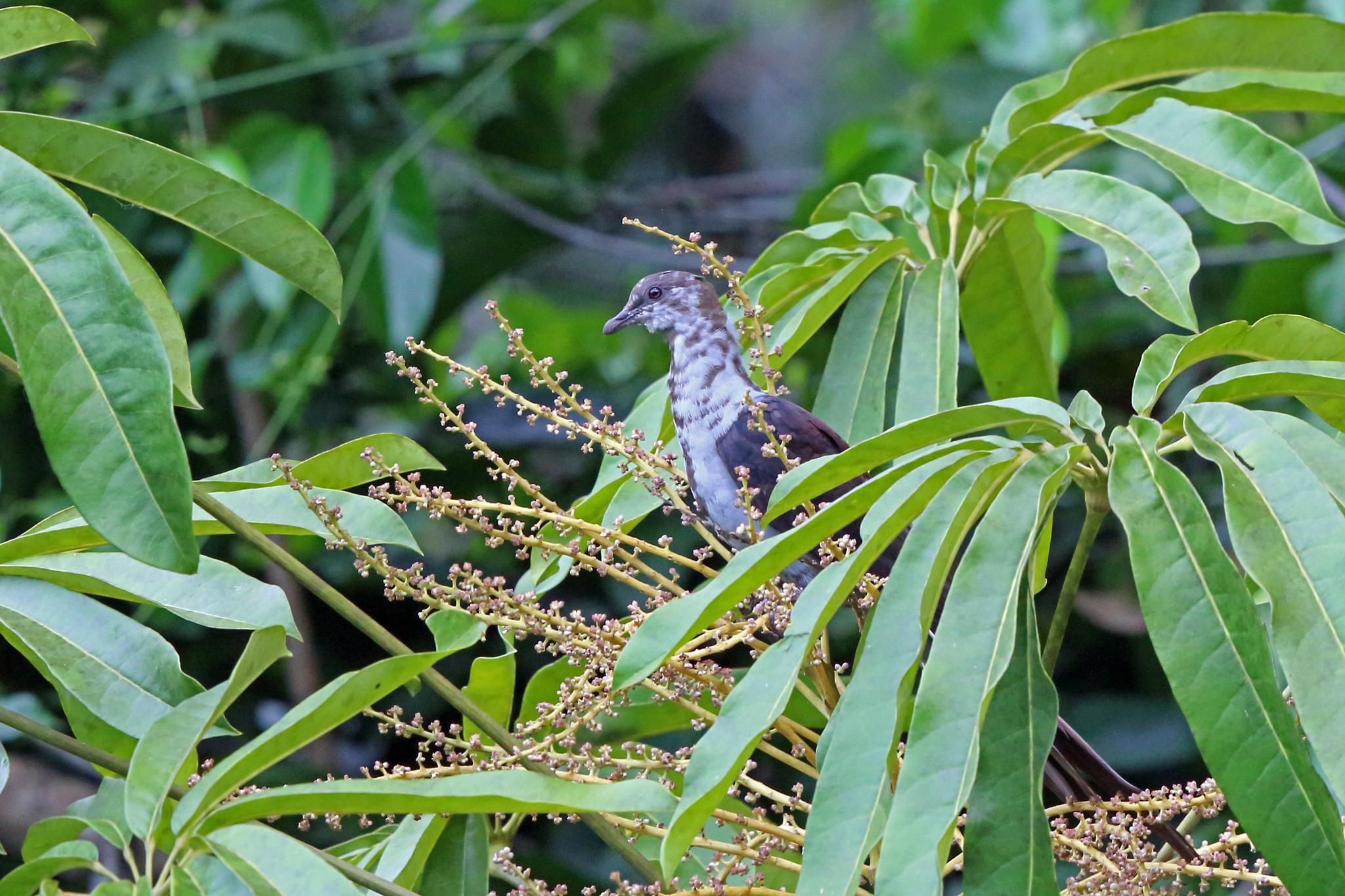
Juvenile R. r. griseotincta on Waigeo

Newly hatched nestlings are pinkish-white. Older nestlings have black bills and feet. Juveniles are dull grey-brown, with dirty-white throats and bellies. The wings are darker than the rest of the body, and the wing-coverts, rump and uppertail-coverts are reddish-brown with dark edges. The central rectrices are sooty-brown with a rufous tinge.

The great cuckoo-dove is easily recognised by its large size and distinctive appearance, with the pale underparts contrasting strongly with the richly-coloured upperparts. However, it may still be confused with the "slender-billed cuckoo dove", a species complex that includes the Amboyna and Sultan's cuckoo-doves. These cuckoo-doves can be distinguished from the great cuckoo-dove by their smaller size and vinous-tinged, more strongly barred underparts, which contrast less with the upper body.

=== Vocalisations ===
The great cuckoo-dove has two distinct calls. The first call is a repeated, upslurred "cookuwook cookuwook cookuwook" resembling the call of the brown cuckoo-dove, but slower and more trisyllabic. The second call is a series of around 12 deep hoo notes, with the notes getting deeper and faster towards the end; this call has been described as resembling "insane laughter".

== Distribution and habitat ==
The great cuckoo-dove is native to Papuasia and Wallacea. In the Maluku Islands of Indonesia, it is found on Buru, Ambon, Seram, Obi, Bacan, Kasiruta, Kayoa, Halmahera, and Morotai. On New Guinea, it occurs across most of the mainland, excluding the Trans-Fly lowlands, as well as the satellite islands of Waigeo, Salawati, Misool, Yapen, Biak, Kumamba, Kairiru, Manam, Karkar, Goodenough, and Fergusson. The species mainly inhabits primary forest and forest edge; on Biak, it is also known from logged forest, secondary growth, and gallery forests. It is found at elevations of up to 3,380 m (11,090 ft) on mainland New Guinea and up to 1,190 m (3,900 ft) on Karkar Island. On the Maluku Islands, it is found from 115–1,400 m (380–4,600 ft), but is most common above 800 m (2,600 ft).

== Behaviour and ecology ==
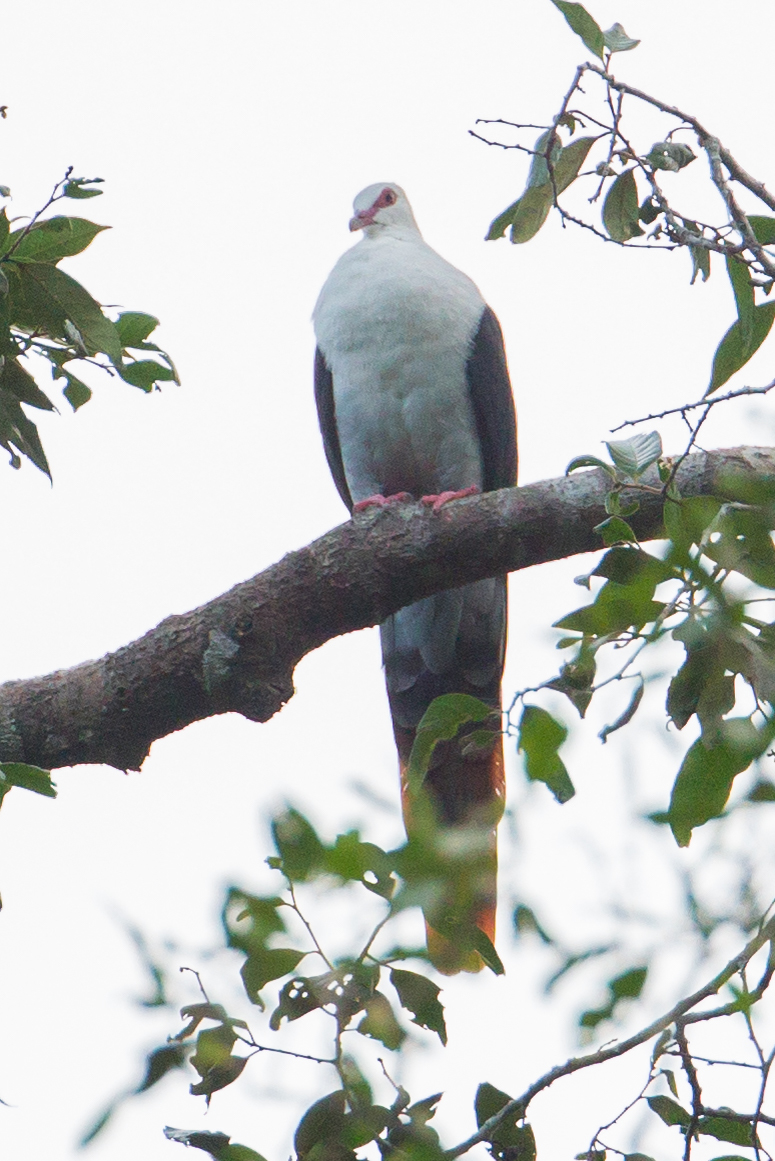
Great cuckoo-doves (R. r. reinwardti pictured) are generally seen in the canopy.

The great cuckoo-dove is usually seen either alone or in pairs in the midstorey or canopy of the forest, although it will form groups of up to ten birds at fruit trees, sometimes joining flocks of other frugivorous birds. It usually flies under the canopy and is fast, despite its slow, powerful, and graceful wingbeats.

=== Feeding ===
The great cuckoo-dove feeds on fruits and small seeds, preferring plants in the family Araliaceae and especially those in the genus Heptapleurum, such as Heptapleurum chaetorrhachis. Feeding usually takes place in the canopy, but occasionally occurs on the ground. It has been observed defending fruiting shrubs that it is feeding on by scaring off other birds that attempt to feed on the shrub, including birds-of-paradise, Ailuroedus catbirds, honeyeaters, and berrypeckers. The dove attacks other birds by "clapping" its wings together loudly, while trying to land on the intruding bird. Defending fruit sources is an uncommon foraging behaviour as it occurs only in certain conditions, requiring intermediate crop sizes and moderate rates of visitation by other birds. The species has also been observed eating soil and several individuals have been found to have stones in their stomachs.

=== Breeding ===
Its typical courtship display consists of a deeply undulating flight, with the bird flying sharply upwards, spreading its wings and tail or clapping its wings together at the top of the flight, and descending sharply. Another reported display involves the bird flying up obliquely from a perch and then returning after flying in a wide circle, similar to the displays performed by Macropygia cuckoo-doves. Breeding has been observed year-round and the breeding season varies in different parts of its range. On Buru, nestlings have been observed in February. On New Guinea, breeding seems to occur throughout the year, with nests or young having been observed from March to August and from October to December, and is thought to peak in the latter period. Nests are flat or slightly concave platforms made of sticks, moss, roots, and ferns, lined with fine plant material. They are usually located in a tree or bush at a height of 1.2–5 m (4–20 ft), although some have been observed as high up as 12 m (39 ft) in Pandanus palms. Nests are sometimes made on rocky ledges in caves or river canyons at heights of 2.4–12 m (7.9–39 ft).

Great cuckoo-doves lay a single white egg, measuring 37.1 mm–40.0 mm × 25.0 mm–26.8 mm (1.46 in–1.57 in × 0.98 in–1.06 in). Captive birds are known to lay multiple clutches if their first clutch fails. Both parents may incubate the egg, which has been observed to hatch after 16 days in captivity and after 22 days in a wild nest. Young are brooded until 13 days after hatching and leave the nest 25 days after hatching. Fledglings begin foraging by themselves 35 days after hatching.

=== Predators and parasites ===
Known parasites of the species include the feather lice Columbicola taschenbergi and Coloceras museihalense. The pygmy eagle is a possible predator.

== Status and conservation ==
The great cuckoo-dove is classified as being of least concern by the International Union for Conservation of Nature due to its sufficiently large range and stable population. Its population size has not been estimated; although it is thought to be generally uncommon throughout its range, it can be locally common in hilly and mountainous areas. It is moderately common in Papua New Guinea and has a density of 4–6 birds per square kilometre in the Crater Mountain Wildlife Management Area, although it can be uncommon in the northeast of the country. On Seram, it is rare in the lowlands, but common at higher elevations.
