= Hugo Paul (politician) =

German politician

Minister for Reconstruction of North Rhine-Westphalia
- In office 29 August 1946 – 5 April 1948
- Minister-President: Rudolf Amelunxen; Karl Arnold
- Preceded by: Office established
- Succeeded by: Ernst Gnoß

Member of the; Landtag of North Rhine-Westphalia; for Remscheid
- In office 2 October 1946 – 17 June 1950
- Preceded by: Constituency established
- Succeeded by: Walter Scheel

Member of the Reichstag; for Düsseldorf East
- In office July 1932 – November 1932

Personal details
- Born: 28 October 1905 Hagen, Westphalia, German Empire
- Died: 12 October 1962 (aged 56) East Berlin, East Germany
- Party: KPD
- Spouse: Luise Klesper (m. 1939)
- Children: Joachim
- Occupation: Political activist Trades union activist Politician; Reichstag member Reconstruction Minister (NRW)

Hugo Paul (28 October 1905 – 12 October 1962) was a German politician (KPD). In 1932 he was briefly a member of the country's national parliament ("Reichstag").

== Early life ==
Hugo Paul was born into a working-class family in Hagen, an industrial city a short distance to the south of Dortmund. On leaving school he embarked on an apprenticeship as a toolmaker. He joined the Young Communists when he was 15, and became a member of the Communist Party itself in 1923. He held a leadership position with the Young Communists in Remscheid. In 1928 he joined the party leadership team (Bezirksleitung) for the Lower Rhine region and in 1929 he became a volunteer contributor to "Freiheit", a party newspaper published in Düsseldorf. In May 1931 Hugo Paul was in the Soviet Union: his stay there proved a defining and lasting experience.

== Political career ==
In July 1932 he was elected to the national parliament ("Reichstag") where, representing the Düsseldorf-East electoral district, he sat as one of 89 Communist Party members of the chamber. 1932 was a year of mounting political crisis, and a second general election took place in November 1932, in which the Nazi Party lost 34 seats and the Communist Party actually gained 11. This time Hugo Paul was not elected, however.

=== Nazi years and wartime ===
In January 1933 the successful Nazi power seizure heralded a rapid switch to single-party dictatorship. The Reichstag fire at the end of February 1933 was immediately blamed on "communists". Directly after the régime change Huge Paul became a "party instructor" for the (now illegal) Communist Party in the Düsseldorf and Mönchengladbach sub-regions. While visiting a printing shop where a new (illegal) party publication was to be produced, he was arrested in Düsseldorf by the Gestapo on 22 June 1934. He was taken to the city centre torture cellar at a Königsallee address where he was very seriously mistreated. In November 1934 the special "People's Court" at Hamm sentenced him to a 30-month jail term. The charge was the usual one of "preparing to commit high treason" ("Vorbereitung zum Hochverrat"). He was held in the penitentiary at Lüttringhausen till April 1936. He was then, till April 1939 held in "protective custody" at the Esterwegen and Sachsenhausen concentration camps.

Paul's partner, Luise Klesper, was also imprisoned in 1933, but she was at liberty by 1935, and after his transfer to Sachsenhausen she was able to visit him at least twice. On the first occasion she took advantage of a special offer of reduced price train tickets in connection with an exhibition held in Berlin in February 1939. Paul and Klesper decided that when he was released the two of them should marry. On the occasion of her second visit to Berlin, Klesper visited both the concentration camp and Theodor Eicke at his Berlin apartment. Eicke was at this time the senior SS-Obergruppenführer responsible for inspection of all the country's concentration camps. Klesper took the opportunity personally to request that he arrange her fiancé's release. It was apparently as a result of this intervention that Paul was indeed released from the concentration camp on 20 April 1939. (The date was significant, having been declared a public holiday to celebrate Adolf Hitler's 50th birthday.) Hugo Paul's marriage to Luise Klesper took place at Wermelskirchen where, by that time, Paul was working, at the start of July.

Between 1939 and 1943 he was at liberty, but kept under police surveillance. During this time he was employed as a toolmaker at the firm "Albert Schulte und Söhne". In order to secure his release Paul had been required to provide an undertaking that he would relinquish all his political contacts, but as time went by he nevertheless began to be at the centre of one or two small discrete groups of communists in and around the Ruhr region, periodically embarking on lengthy hikes in order to sustain contacts. He was in touch with Maria Eckertz in Cologne. This meant that the risk of his further imprisonment was a constant part of his and Luise's life.

In January 1943 Hugo and Luise Paul were re-arrested by the Gestapo, suspected of "preparing to commit high treason". This was part of a large wave of arrests in the Ruhr-Rhine region, and some of those caught up in it, including Luise, were soon released. However, between August 1943 and August 1944 Hugo Paul was held in prison in Wuppertal. On 16 August 1944 he was back before the special "People's Court". The public prosecution service demanded the death sentence, but this was rejected by the court because of a shortage of firm evidence of illegality and Paul's record as a "good worker", so instead he was sentenced to a six-year jail term. Between September 1944 and April 1945 he was held at the penitentiary at Butzbach. War ended, formally, in May 1945 which coincided with the collapse of the Nazi régime. When Paul was released, it was into what was in the process of becoming the British occupation zone of post war Germany.

=== British occupation zone ===
"We want the people to be united behind the creation of true democratic order in Germany. None of us would be so superficial as to believe that we can get out of all this chaos, this confusion and turmoil, without the help of everyone willing and able to join in. Producing a united people cannot be achieved without a united working class. How should we achieve a united working class? We must work together with the Social Democratic party leadership to find the basis for a shared workers' programme to support our people. We must create a good comradely relationship with the Social Democrats. Mutual suspicions, arising where party officers still have not learned the lessons of the past, must be overcome. Comrades! It is not what divides us but what unites us that must form the basis for all our dialogues with members of the Social Democratic Party."

"… Wir wollen die Einheit des Volkes zur Aufrichtung einer wahren demokratischen Ordnung in Deutschland. Keiner von uns wird so leichtfertig sein anzunehmen, dass wir aus diesem Chaos, aus dieser Zerrissenheit und Verwirrtheit unseres Volkes ohne die Mithilfe aller aufbauwilligen Kräfte herauskämen. Die Herstellung der Einheit des Volkes erfordert zuerst einmal die Einheit der Arbeiterklasse. Wie soll diese Einheit der Arbeiterklasse realisiert werden? Wir müssen uns mit der sozialdemokratischen Parteileitung auf dem Boden des gemeinsamen Arbeiterprogramms im Interesse unseres Volkes zusammenfinden. Es muss ein gutes Verhältnis zur Sozialdemokratie und eine enge Kameradschaft hergestellt werden. Das beiderseitige Misstrauen, selbst wenn einige Funktionäre aus der Vergangenheit nicht gelernt hätten, muss überwunden werden. Genossen! Nicht das Trennende, sondern das was einigt, muss die Grundlage aller Aussprachen mit den Mitgliedern der Sozialdemokratischen Partei sein …"

Hugo Paul addressing the party membership in August 1945

"When this [NRW regional] government was formed, under the leadership of Minister-president Karl Arnold, a government declaration was issued in the parliament, in which recognition of German unity was proclaimed without reservation. [calls of agreement from left-wing members] The negotiations that took place here yesterday and today have demonstrated that there are powerful forces among us who are not prepared to get together with democratic forces in the Soviet occupation zone, [calls of 'not true?' from right-wing members] in order to confer on how to create German unity.[calls of 'very good' from left-wing members] That was underlined by a clear "No" from certain gentlemen in the CDU section. And this clear "No" is a rejection of the people in the Soviet occupation zone. It is a recognition of a [separate] 'West German' state and in that sense, whether you like it or not, comes close to treason against the nation. [calls of 'bravo' from left-wing members] [But] I stand by German unity and I back my party's declaration [on it].[loud cheers from left-wing members]

"Als diese Regierung gebildet wurde unter der Führung des Herrn Ministerpräsidenten Karl Arnold, wurde in diesem Hause eine Regierungserklärung abgegeben, in der ohne jeglichen Vorbehalt ein Bekenntnis zur Einheit Deutschlands abgelegt wurde. (Zwischenruf links: Sehr richtig!) Die gestrigen und heutigen Verhandlungen in diesem Hause haben bewiesen, dass es hier Kräfte gibt, die nicht bereit sind, sich mit den demokratischen Kräften in der sowjetischen Besatzungszone zusammenzusetzen. (Zwischenruf rechts: Nicht richtig?), um zu beraten über die Herstellung der Einheit Deutschlands. (Sehr gut, links!) Man hat das mit einem deutlichen Nein von einigen Herren der CDU-Fraktion unterstrichen. Und dieses deutliche Nein ist eine Absage an die Menschen in der sowjetischen Besatzungszone, ist ein Bekenntnis zu einem westdeutschen Staat und grenzt, ob man will oder nicht, an jenes verhängnisvolle Wort, welches man mit dem Wort „Landesverrat“ bezeichnet (Bravorufe links!) Ich bekenne mich zur Einheit Deutschlands und stelle mich hinter die Erklärung meiner Fraktion. (Bravorufe und starker Beifall links)“"

Hugo Paul on learning of his dismissal from his ministerial post, addressing the NRW Landtag in the first part of 1948

In 1945 Hugo Paul re-assumed his Communist Party responsibilities, becoming the party's regional chairman as the basic institutional party frameworks were rapidly restored. Additionally, on 26 October 1946 he was a founder member of the Düsseldorf region Union of Persecutees of the Nazi Regime ("Vereinigung der Verfolgten des Naziregimes "/ VVN). There was a widespread belief that the Nazis had been able to come to power in 1933 only because of disunity on the political left. In his actions, and also in what he proclaimed in public, Hugo Paul the communist stressed his willingness to work with Social Democrats on reconstruction. He was conscious that the Potsdam Agreement between the winning powers placed emphasis on the need to avoid concentrating power in the hands of big business and finance in any future German state. During the later 1940s, as the political tensions inherent in the separate military occupation zones agreed between the allies became ever more apparent, Paul's commitment to solidarity on the political left would leave him increasingly isolated from the political mainstream in what became, in May 1949, West Germany.

Between 29 August 1946 and 5 April 1948 Hugo Paul was the Reconstruction Minister for North Rhine-Westphalia (NRW), a newly defined "federal state" that combined the old Prussian Province of Westphalia with the northern part of the former Rhine Province. Between 2 October 1946 and 17 June 1950 he sat as a member of the NRW parliament (Landtag). Membership of the parliament in October 1946 resulted from nomination by the British military administration, allocated to representatives of the political parties in proportions that reflected the election results of 1932, which was determined to have been the last time free and fair elections had been held in Germany. This gave the Communists 34 of the 200 seats in the assembly. Paul was also a member of the second nominated NRW parliament in December 1946. Within the NRW Landtag he served as deputy leader of the Communist Party group till April 1947. In April 1947 regional elections were held, and Hugo Paul, now representing the Remscheid electoral district, held his seat, retaining it till the 1950 election when the Remscheid seat passed to Walter Scheel of the Free Democratic Party.

Between 1947 and 1948 he was a member of the Zone advisory council in the British occupation zone. Until 6 October 1948 he was a member of the Parliamentary Council which paved the way for a return to democratic processes and structures in Germany, although by this time it had become impossible to ignore the extent to which further east, in the Soviet occupation zone, political developments did not point to a democratic future.

By 1948 Paul had become regional chairman of the Communist Party for North Rhine-Westphalia. However, on 7 and 8 December 1949, in a joint meeting of the party executive and the regional secretariat, he was sent on leave from this position because, it was recorded, he had failed to pass on what he knew about the Titoist contacts of the editor in chief of the Communist Newspaper, "Freies Volk" ("Free People"). This was followed by his permanent removal from the regional chairmanship in February 1950. His successor in the post was Josef Ledwohn.

=== German Federal Republic ===
On the national stage, the British occupation zone (which included NRW) was merged with the US and French occupation zones and relaunched, in the wake of the 1948/49 Berlin Blockade, as the US-sponsored German Federal Republic. Conspicuously excluded was the region still administered as the Soviet occupation zone, which would itself be relaunched as the Soviet sponsored German Democratic Republic (East Germany) in October 1949. The German Federal Republic held its first General Election in August 1949 and the Communist Party received more than 5% of the national vote which entitled it to 15 seats. Hugo Paul's name had been on the candidate list, positioned high enough up for him to be one of those who now entered the national parliament ("Bundestag") as a Communist Party member of it.

Nevertheless, reports coming out of East Germany were leading to heightened Cold War tensions, as part of which, in West Germany, the Communist Party was becoming increasingly marginalised. In November 1951 a criminal investigation was launched by the West German government against Paul because of his "anti-constitutional politics" ("verfassungsfeindliche Politik"). The West German chancellor signed the authorisation for the process on 20 November 1951 because Paul had "described the West German government as a puppet government and discussed illegal and warlike measures". It was also reported that Paul had been distributing Communist Party leaflets urging supporters that the " ... hour has come for the German People to take responsibility" ("Die Stunde der Verantwortung des deutschen Volkes ist gekommen"). His political agitation had already triggered an application from a regional court to lift his parliamentary immunity two months earlier, in August 1951. At the end of 1951 he reacted by temporarily removing himself across the (still relatively porous) inner German frontier into East Germany. He nevertheless remained a member of the Bundestag till the end of the parliamentary term, in July 1953, vociferous in opposition to cutting of bread subsidies, and hostile to the Adenauer government's attempt to push through "Anglo-American colonial policies" in West Germany, accusing the government of applying a "divide and rule" strategy. In 1953 he was briefly imprisoned by the West German High Court, citing "high treason" and "endangering the state" apparently in connection with the government process launched two and a half years earlier.

== Personal life ==
On 1 July 1939 Hugo Paul married Luise Klesper (1912–1998) who was, like him, a Communist Party member. They first met in Remscheid after 1926, when he had become the local head of the Young Communist League of Germany.

By the time of his death of 12 October 1962 Hugo Paul had relocated to the German Democratic Republic. He died suddenly from a pulmonary embolism while undergoing back surgery. There are indications that the back surgery had become necessary to avert rapidly developing spinal paralysis which was an after effect of the torture he had undergone during the Nazi period.
