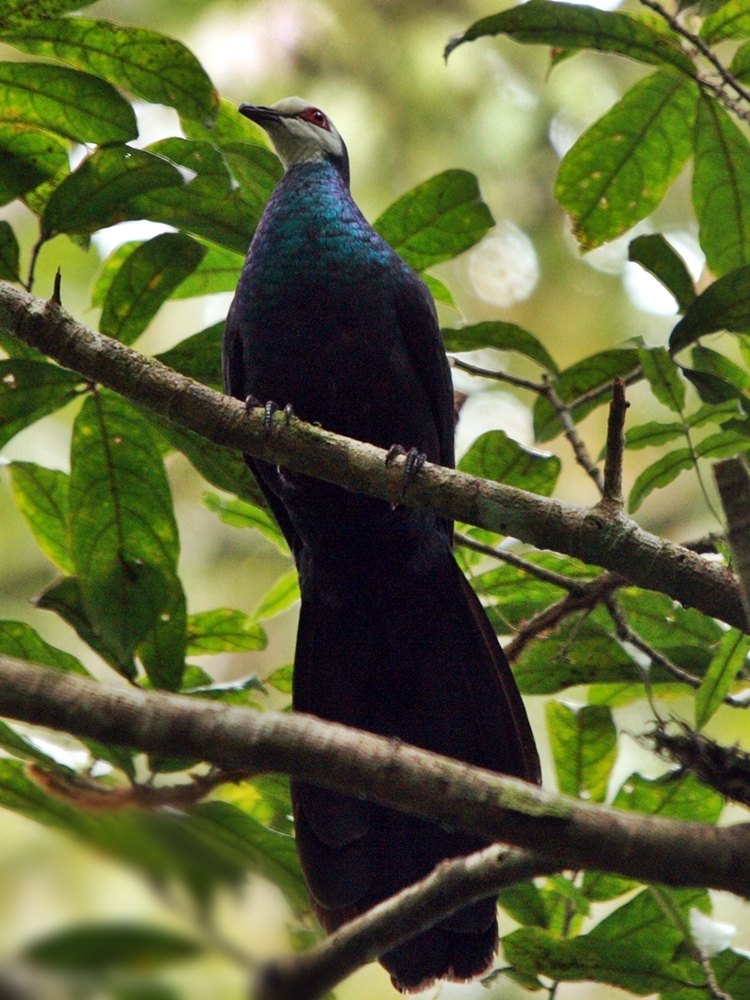
- at Mount Mahawu, North Sulawesi

Conservation status
- Least Concern (IUCN 3.1)

Scientific classification
- Kingdom: Animalia
- Phylum: Chordata
- Class: Aves
- Order: Columbiformes
- Family: Columbidae
- Genus: Turacoena
- Species: T. manadensis

Binomial name
- Turacoena manadensis (Quoy & Gaimard, 1832)

= White-faced cuckoo-dove =

Species of bird

The white-faced cuckoo-dove (Turacoena manadensis), also known as the white-faced dove, is a species of bird in the family Columbidae. It is endemic to Sulawesi and the Togian Islands in Indonesia. The Sula cuckoo-dove was previously considered conspecific.
