= Adolf Clarenbach =

German Protestant martyr

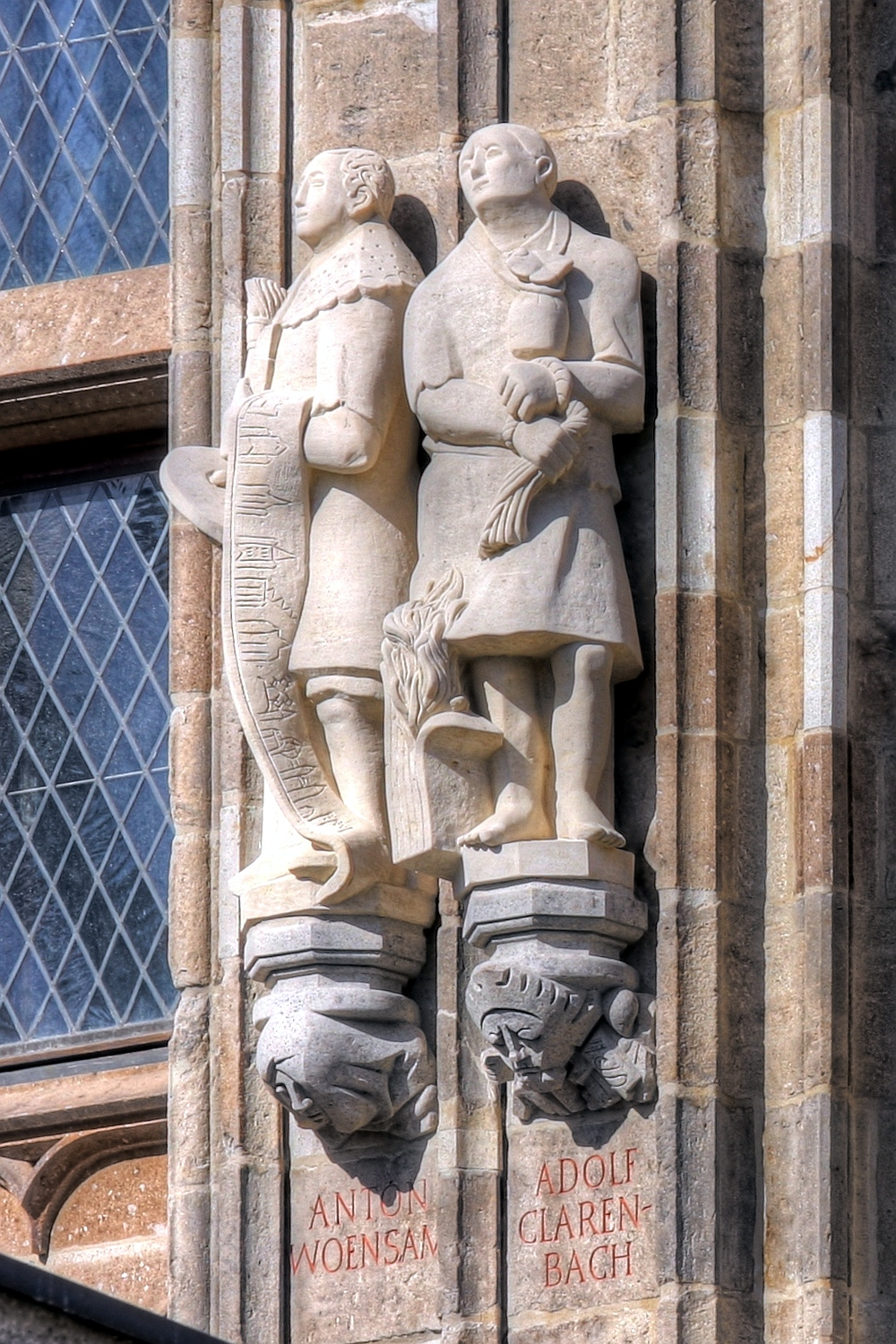
Statue of Adolf Clarenbach (right) on Cologne City Hall

Adolf Clarenbach (or Klarenbach) (c. 1497 – 28 September 1529), burnt at the stake in Cologne, died as one of the first Protestant martyrs of the Reformation in the Lower Rhine region in Germany.

== Life ==
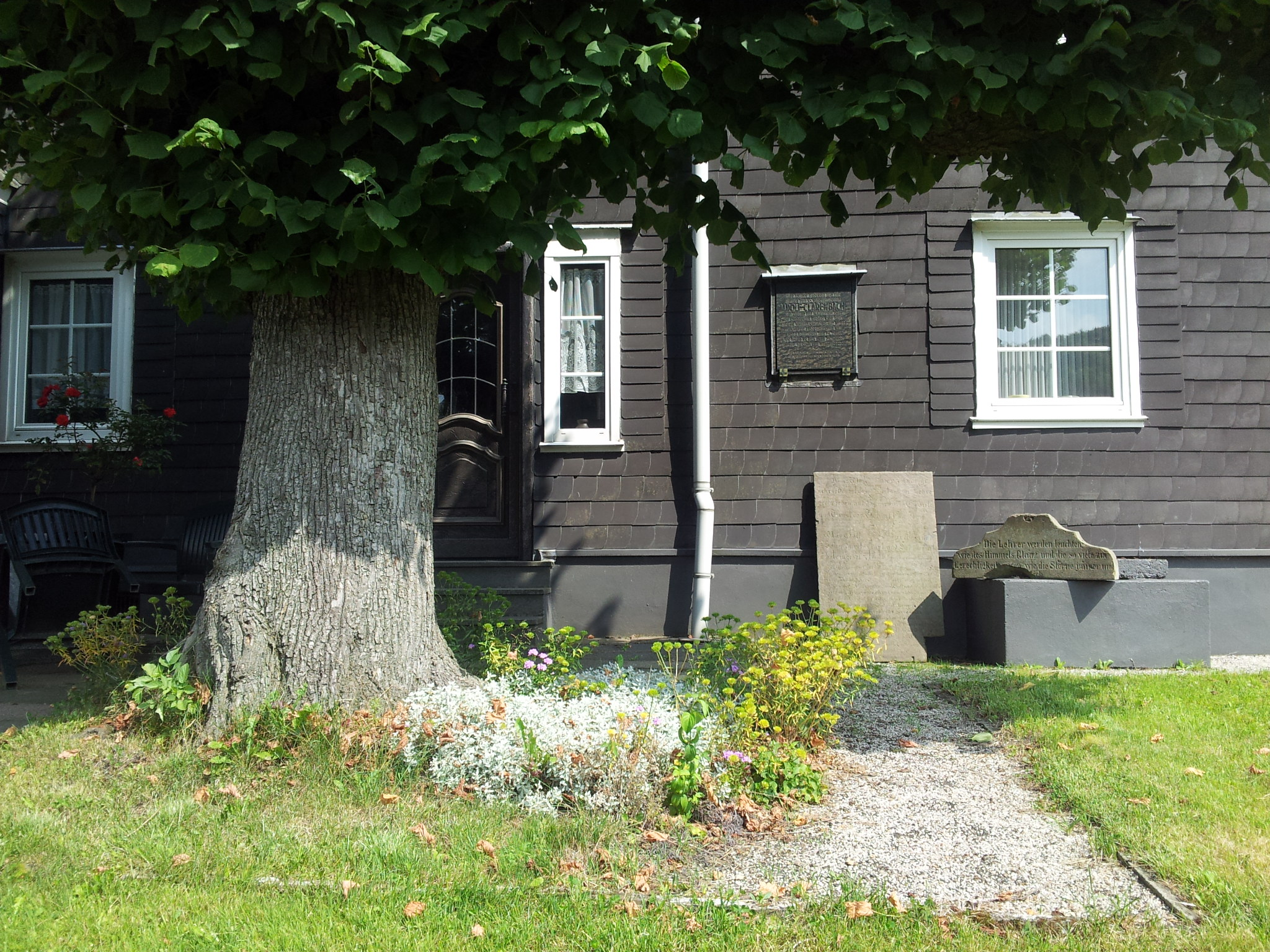
A memorial plaque on Buscherhof reminds of Adolf Clarenbach's birth location

Adolf Clarenbach was born shortly before the end of the 15th century on "Buscherhof", a farm that belonged administratively to Lennep in the former Duchy of Berg and ecclesiastically to Lüttringhausen. His exact birth date is unknown. The house of his birth now bears a memorial plaque to the "Reformer of Berg" ("Bergischer Reformator").

After 1523, Clarenbach, a teacher, sought to spread the principles of the Reformation first in Münster, then in Wesel, for which he was dismissed from his post by John III, Duke of Cleves. In 1525 he was driven from Osnabrück, Büderich and Elberfeld, also because of his open adherence to the teachings of Martin Luther.

=== Execution ===
On 3 April 1528, Clarenbach was imprisoned and confined for 18 months. Petrus Medmann, an eye witness to Clarenbach's eventual execution, wrote a marginal note about Adolf Clarenbach in one of his books:

After two years' arrest he could have escaped the cruel imprisonment if he had only admitted that the laity have no claim to half the sacrament. Twice I heard him in disputation with the so-called theologians: of excellent memory and in every way to the point, he proved all his teachings from the Holy Scriptures; and of the church fathers he particularly quoted Augustine.

The religious authorities sentenced Clarenbach to death, to be burnt at the stake on 28 September 1529 outside Cologne, with another follower of Luther, the "blasphemer" Peter Fliesteden. The men were burned at the Melatenhof, south of the present-day Melaten-Friedhof ("Melaten Burial Ground") near the crossroads of the Clarenbachstraße and the Lortzingstraße.

Clarenbach's last words were reported as follows:

And when you have killed me, you will still not have your way, but I will have eternal life. So even this death does not terrify me, for I know that Christ has overcome death, the devil and hell.

He is said to have shouted these words to the judge before being led into the straw hut that served as the execution fire.

== Legacy ==
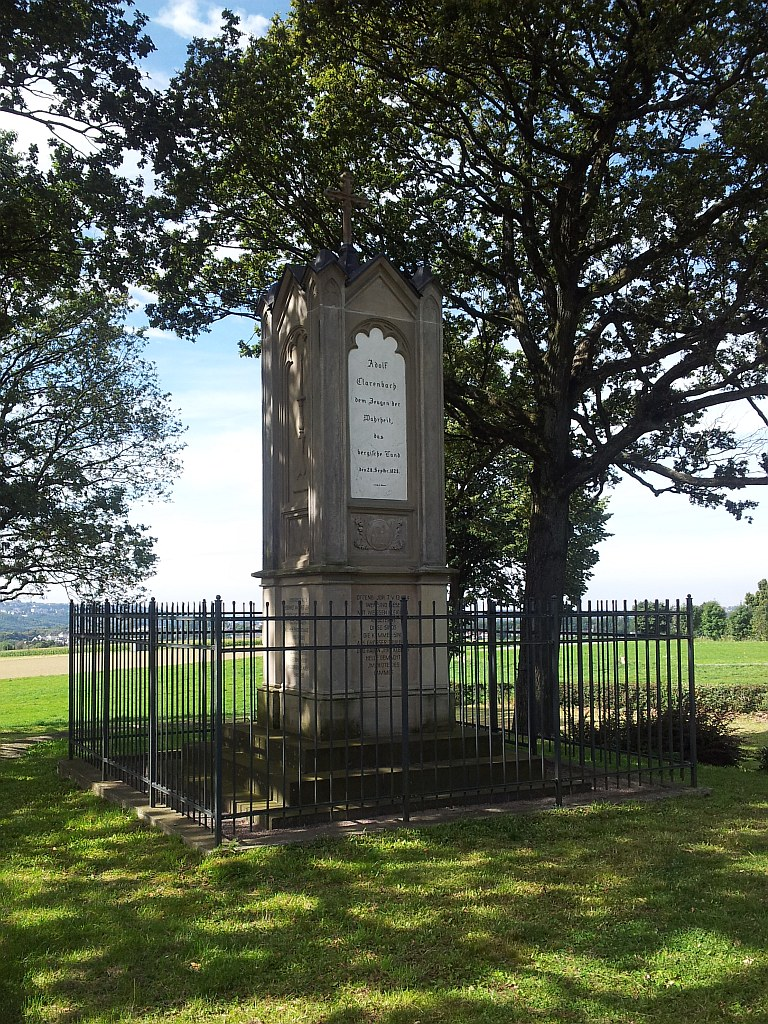
Adolf Clarenbach monument in Lüttringhausen close to the B51

Three hundred years after his death an Adolf Clarenbach monument was raised in his birthplace Lüttringhausen at the present Bundesstraße 51 (abbreviated B51). The inscription says that the monument is dedicated to the witness of truth, Adolf Clarenbach, and contains the dates and places of his birth and death. On each side verses from the Bible are quoted which can be found at Rev. 7:13-14, John 11:25, Mark 8:35 and Hebr 13:7-8. Since 2002 an evening concert in the summer has been arranged there by the Heimatbund Lüttringhausen ("Lüttringhausen Civic Society"), the proceeds of which are dedicated to the upkeep of the memorial. Also in his honour in 1829 a candelabra was presented which is still in the Lutheran church of Remscheid-Lüttringhausen.

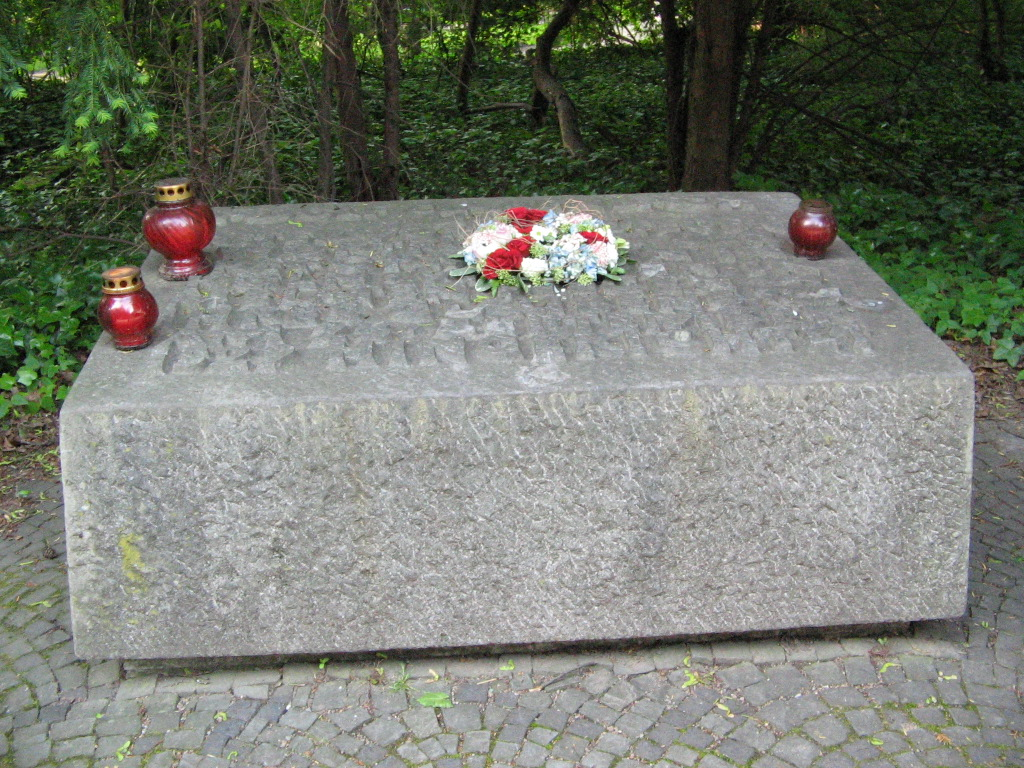
Memorial stone to Adolf Clarenbach and Peter Fliesteden

In the Melaten-Friedhof in Cologne there is a memorial stone to Adolf Clarenbach and Peter Fliesteden.

== Sources ==
- Bluhm, Axel (ed), 1981: Allein Gottes Wort: Vorträge, Ansprachen, Besinnungen anlässlich des 450. Todestages der Märtyrer Adolf Clarenbach und Peter Fliesteden; Schriftenreihe des Vereins für Rheinische Kirchengeschichte 62. Cologne: Rheinland-Verlag; Bonn: Habelt. ISBN 3-7927-0571-0
- Deutsches Geschlechterbuch, vol. 168, pp. 177–416 (genealogy of the Clarenbach family)
- Lauff, Werner, 1997: Adolf Clarenbach. Räudiges Schaf und faules stinkendes Glied oder Märtyrer der Kirche; in: Karl-Heinz zur Mühlen, André Ritter (ed): 100 Jahre Evangelisch-theologisches Studienhaus Adolf Clarenbach. 1897–1997; Schriftenreihe des Vereins für Rheinische Kirchengeschichte 125, pp. 55–78. Cologne: Rheinland-Verlag
- Müller-Diersfordt, Hermann: Der blaue Stein in Köln und Peter Fliestedens Hinrichtung 1529; in: Monatshefte für rheinische Kirchengeschichte Kirchengeschichte. NF 9 (1960), p. 74
