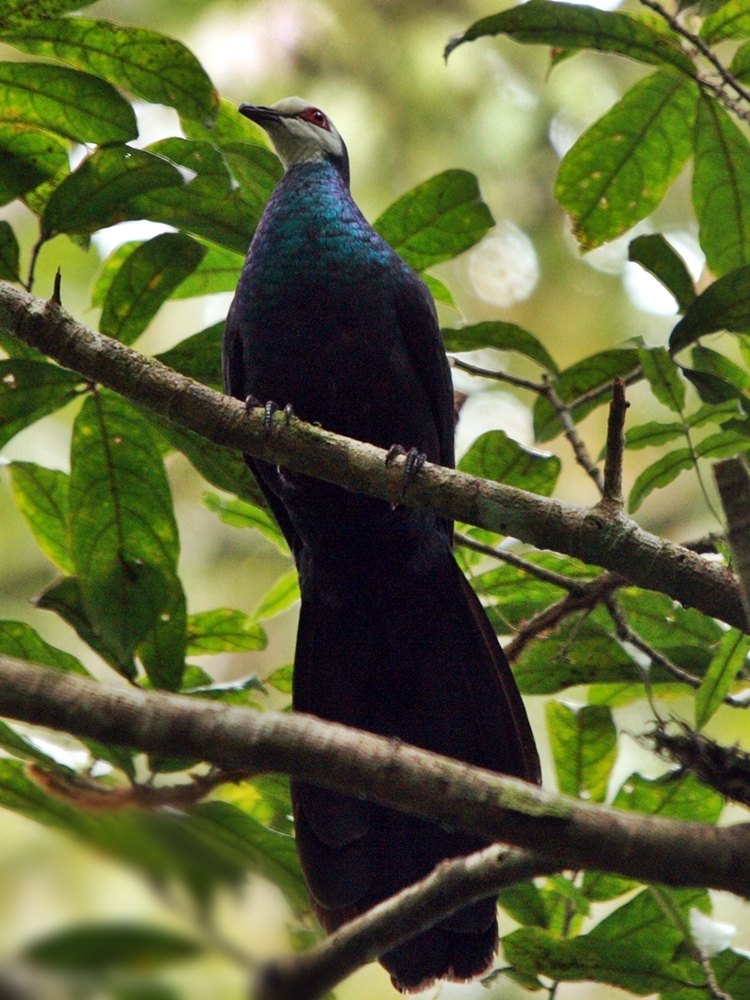
- White-faced cuckoo-dove (Turacoena manadensis) in North Sulawesi

Scientific classification
- Domain: Eukaryota
- Kingdom: Animalia
- Phylum: Chordata
- Class: Aves
- Order: Columbiformes
- Family: Columbidae
- Subfamily: Columbinae
- Genus: Turacoena; Bonaparte, 1854

Type species
- Columba manadensis Quoy & Gaimard, 1830

Species
- See text

= Turacoena =

Genus of birds

Turacoena is a small genus of doves in the family Columbidae that are found in Indonesia.

The genus was introduced in 1854 by the French naturalist Charles Lucien Bonaparte. The type species is the white-faced cuckoo-dove (Turacoena manadensis). The name Turacoena combines the genus name Turacus introduced by the French naturalist Georges Cuvier in 1800 and the Ancient Greek oinas meaning "pigeon".

The genus includes just 3 species.

Genus Turacoena – Bonaparte, 1854 – three species
| Common name | Scientific name and subspecies | Range | Size and ecology | IUCN status and estimated population |
|---|---|---|---|---|
| White-faced cuckoo-dove | Turacoena manadensis (Quoy & Gaimard, 1832) | Sulawesi and the Togian Islands in Indonesia. | Size: Habitat: Diet: | LC |
| Sula cuckoo-dove | Turacoena sulaensis Forbes & Robinson, 1900 | Sula Islands and the Banggai Archipelago, Indonesia | Size: Habitat: Diet: | LC |
| Black cuckoo-dove | Turacoena modesta (Temminck, 1835) | Lesser Sunda Islands and is found on Timor, Wetar, Rote, and Atauro | Size: Habitat: Diet: | NT |
