= Lüttringhausen =

District of the German town of Remscheid

Coordinates: 51°13′N 7°14′E

Lüttringhausen is a district of the German town of Remscheid with a population of 17,857 in 2005; 11,829 in 1905; 13,560, mostly Protestant, in 1910.

== Overview ==
It was founded around the year 1189. At this time, Lüttringhausen belonged to the County of Berg. In 1929, Lüttringhausen was incorporated in the municipality of Remscheid.

Remscheid prison of is in Lüttringhausen, as well as a large Protestant psychiatric hospital called Stiftung Tannenhof. The Autobahn 1 passes Lüttringhausen, offering two junctions: ("Ronsdorf-Lüttringhausen" and "Lüttringhausen-Lennep").

There are many notable churches in Lüttringhausen, the oldest of which is a Protestant church built in 1735. Its architecture is considered a Baroque architectural masterpiece typical of the regional style found around "Bergisches Land". The town hall, built in 1907, is also well-known.

Adolf Clarenbach, one of the first Protestant martyrs on the Lower Rhine, was born on the "Buscherhof" in Lüttringhausen around the year 1497. He was burnt at the stake in Cologne on September 28, 1529 because of his activities as a reformer.

Every year on the first Sunday in Advent the Christmas fair in Lüttringhausen is visited by many thousands of people.

== Notable people ==
- Caspar Georg Carl Reinwardt (1773–1854), botanist
