= List of Timor-Leste–related topics =

This is a list of topics related to Timor-Leste. Those interested in the subject can monitor changes to the pages by clicking on Related changes in the sidebar.

== Timor-Leste ==
- Timor-Leste

== Buildings and structures in Timor-Leste ==
=== Airports in Timor-Leste ===
- Baucau Airport
- Dili Airport, officially Presidente Nicolau Lobato International Airport and formerly Comoro Airport
- Oecusse Airport
- Suai Airport, officially Commander in Chief of FALINTIL, Kay Rala Xanana Gusmão, International Airport
- Viqueque Airport

== Cities in Timor-Leste ==
- List of cities, towns and villages in Timor-Leste
- Aileu
- Ainaro
- Atabae
- Atsabe
- Balibo
- Baquia
- Baucau
- Bazartete
- Bobonaro
- Buku Mera
- Dare
- Dili
- Ermera
- Fatubesi
- Fatolulic
- Fohorern
- Gleno
- Hatolia
- Hotudo
- Laga
- Letefoho
- Liquiçá
- Lolotoe
- Lospalos
- Maliana
- Manatuto
- Maubara
- Metinaro
- Pante Macassar
- Passabe
- Quelicai
- Railaco
- Same
- Suai
- Tilomar
- Venilale
- Viqueque
- Zumalai

== Communications in Timor-Leste ==
- Telecommunications in Timor-Leste
- .tl
- .tp

== East Timorese culture ==
- Culture of Timor-Leste
- Arte Moris
- Bibi Bulak
- Coat of arms of Timor-Leste
- Flag of Timor-Leste

=== Languages of Timor-Leste ===
- Languages of Timor-Leste
- Bunak
- Fataluku language
- Makalero
- Makasae
- Mambai
- Tetum language
- Tocodede
- Waimoa language
- Wetarese

=== East Timorese music ===
- Music of Timor-Leste

== Districts of Timor-Leste ==
- Districts of Timor-Leste
- Aileu District
- Ainaro District
- Baucau District
- Bobonaro District
- Cova Lima District
- Dili District
- Ermera District
- Lautém District
- Liquiçá District
- Manatuto District
- Manufahi District
- Oecusse District
- Viqueque District

== Economy of Timor-Leste ==
- Economy of Timor-Leste
- Timor-Leste centavo coins
- Portuguese Timorese pataca

=== Trade unions of Timor-Leste ===
- Timor-Leste Trade Union Confederation

== Education in Timor-Leste ==
- Arte Moris
- Bibi Bulak
- Universidade Nacional de Timor-Leste
- Universidade Dili

=== Schools in Timor-Leste ===
- St Joseph's High School, Timor-Leste

== Geography of Timor-Leste ==
- Geography of Timor-Leste
- Demographics of Timor-Leste
- ISO 3166-2:TL
- Ombai Strait
- Administrative posts of Timor-Leste
- Timor
- Timor Sea
- Wetar Strait

=== Hiking in Timor-Leste ===
- Mount Ramelau

=== Islands of Timor-Leste ===
- Atauro Island
- Jaco Island
- Sunda Islands

=== Mountains of Timor-Leste ===
- Mount Ramelau

=== National parks of Timor-Leste ===
- Nino Konis Santana National Park

== Government of Timor-Leste ==
- East Timor solidarity movement
- Timor Leste Defence Force
- National Parliament of Timor-Leste
- President of Timor-Leste
- Prime Minister of Timor-Leste
- United Nations Office in Timor Leste

=== Foreign relations of Timor-Leste ===
- Foreign relations of Timor-Leste
- List of Ambassadors from New Zealand to Timor-Leste
- Timorese diplomatic missions
- United Nations Office in Timor Leste

== History of Timor-Leste ==
- History of Timor-Leste
- 1959 Viqueque Rebellion
- 2006 East Timor crisis
- Aitarak
- Balibo Five
- Battle of Timor (1942-43)
- Besi Merah Putih
- Commission for Reception, Truth and Reconciliation in East Timor
- Dili massacre
- East Timor solidarity movement
- Indonesian invasion of East Timor
- INTERFET
- Laksaur
- Liquiçá Church Massacre
- Operation Astute
- Portuguese Timor
- Portuguese Timorese escudo
- Portuguese Timorese pataca
- Pro-Indonesia militia
- Second Special Panel
- Sparrow Force
- Suai Church Massacre
- Timor Gap Treaty
- UN Administrator for East Timor
- United Nations Mission of Support to East Timor
- United Nations Transitional Administration in East Timor

=== Elections in Timor-Leste ===
- Elections in Timor-Leste

== Organisations based in Timor-Leste ==
- Associação dos Escuteiros de Timor Lorosae

=== Political parties in Timor-Leste ===
- List of political parties in Timor-Leste
- Association of Timorese Heroes
- Christian Democratic Party (Timor-Leste)
- Christian Democratic Party of Timor
- Democratic Liberal Party (Timor-Leste)
- Democratic Party (Timor-Leste)
- Fretilin
- People's Party of Timor
- Social Democratic Party (Timor-Leste)
- Socialist Party of Timor
- Timorese Democratic Union
- Timorese Nationalist Party
- Timorese Social Democratic Association

== East Timorese people ==
- List of East Timorese people
- Mari Alkatiri
- Cristina Amaral
- Carlos Filipe Ximenes Belo
- Martinho da Costa Lopes
- Gil da Cruz Trindade
- Eurico Guterres
- Alfredo Reinado
- Kirsty Sword Gusmão

=== East Timorese politicians ===
- Mari Alkatiri
- Francisco Xavier do Amaral
- Xanana Gusmão
- Hamis Hatta
- Nicolau dos Reis Lobato
- Anna Pessoa Pinto
- President of Timor-Leste
- Prime Minister of Timor-Leste
- José Ramos-Horta
- Aniceto Guterres Lopes
- Maria Angelina Lopes Sarmento
- Luis Roberto da Silva

== Politics of Timor-Leste ==
- Politics of Timor-Leste
- Mário Lemos Pires
- National Parliament of Timor-Leste

== Religion in Timor-Leste ==
- Roman Catholicism in Timor-Leste

== East Timorese society ==
- Associação dos Escuteiros de Timor Lorosae
- Demographics of Timor-Leste
- Galoli
- Mambai
- Pátria

== Sport in Timor-Leste ==
- Sport in Timor-Leste
- IOA

=== East Timorese sports teams ===
- Timor-Leste national football team

=== East Timorese sportspeople ===
==== East Timorese athletes ====
- Gil da Cruz Trindade

=== Football in Timor-Leste ===
- Timor-Leste national football team
- Federaçao Futebol Timor-Leste

==== Football venues in Timor-Leste ====
- National Stadium (Timor-Leste)

=== Recreation in Timor-Leste ===
- Diving in Timor-Leste

=== Timor-Leste at the Olympics ===
- Timor-Leste at the 2004 Summer Olympics

== Transport in Timor-Leste ==
=== Airlines of Timor-Leste ===
- Timor Air

== See also ==
- Lists of country-related topics - similar lists for other countries
