= Baquia =

Baquia may refer to:

- Bequia, Caribbean island
- Baguia, East Timor
