= KSTL =

KSTL may refer to:

- KSTL (AM), a radio station (690 AM) licensed to St. Louis, Missouri, United States
- The Timor-Leste Trade Union Confederation (Konfederasaun Sindicatu Timor Lorosa'e)
- The ICAO code for St. Louis Lambert International Airport
- Standard Template Library for kernel-mode applications
