= Flag of Timor-Leste =

Democratic Republic of Timor-Leste
- Use: National flag and ensign
- Proportion: 1:2
- Adopted: 28 November 1975; 50 years ago (de facto); 20 May 2002; 24 years ago (de jure)
- Design: A red field with the black isosceles triangle based on the hoist-side bearing a white five-pointed star in the center superimposed on the larger yellow triangle, also based on the hoist-side, that extends to the center of the flag.
- Designed by: Natalino Leitão

The national flag of Timor-Leste (bandeira nacional de Timor-Leste; bandeira nasionál) consists of a red field with the black isosceles triangle based on the hoist-side bearing a white five-pointed star in the center superimposed on the larger yellow triangle, also based on the hoist-side, that extends to the center of the flag.

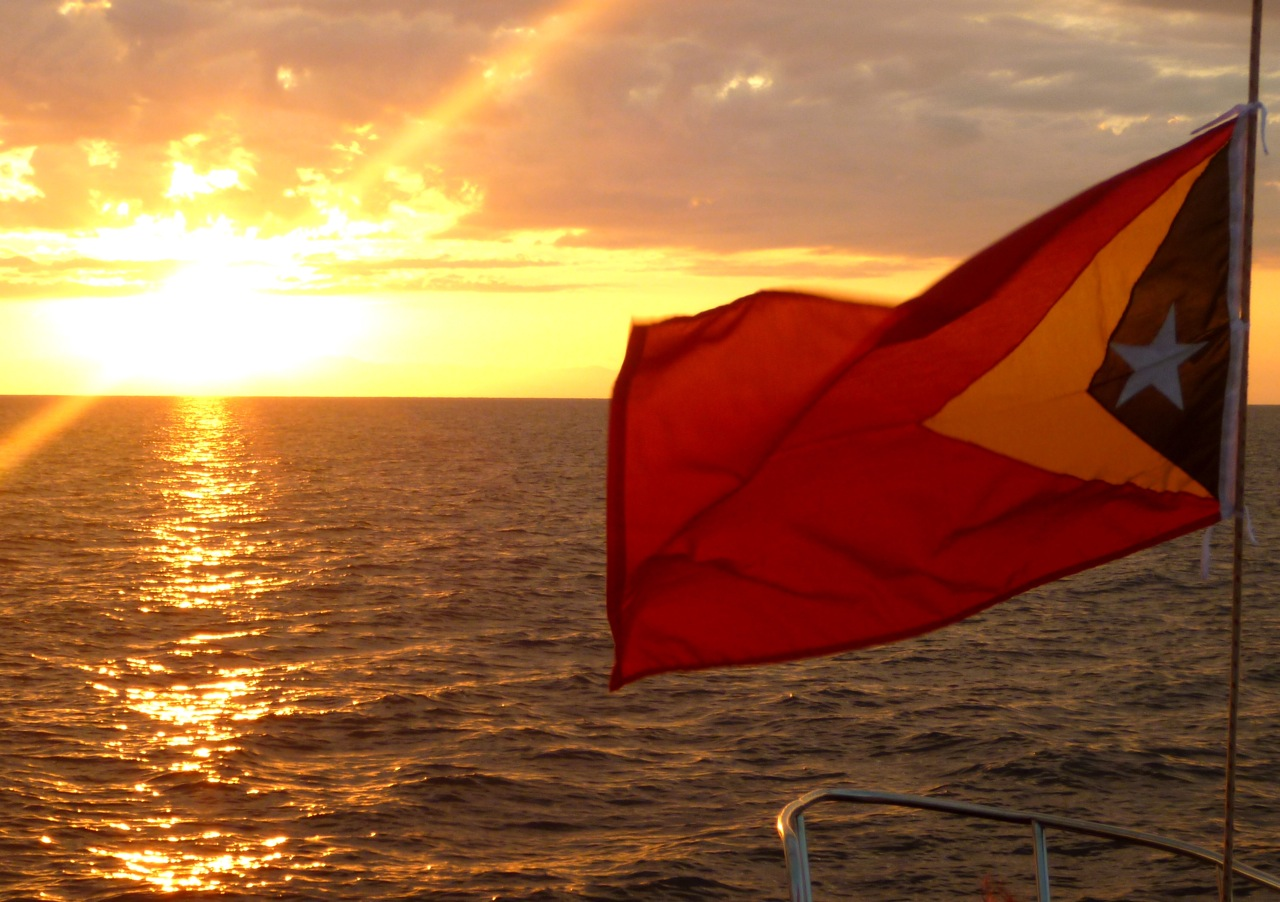
Flying flag of Timor-Leste at sunset

== Official description of the flag ==
Construction sheet for the flag of Timor-Leste.

According to the Constitution of the Democratic Republic of Timor-Leste, Part I, Section 15:

"The national flag is rectangular and is formed by two isosceles triangles, the bases of which are overlapping. One triangle is black and its height is equal to two-third of the length overlapped to the yellow triangle, whose height is equal to half the length of the Flag. In the centre of the black triangle there is a white star of five ends, meaning the light that guides. The white star has one of its ends turned towards the left side end of the flag. The remaining part of the flag is red."

With the constitution of the Democratic Republic of Timor-Leste on 28 November 1975, the flag was officially adopted for the first time. The symbolism of this flag was given the following meaning:

- Black represents the four centuries of colonial oppression.
- The yellow arrowhead represents "the traces of colonialism in Timor-Leste's history" and the struggle for independence.
- Red stands for the spilled blood of the population.
- The white star symbolises hope for a better future.

Today, both the colours and their meanings are specified in the new Constitution of the Democratic Republic of Timor-Leste of 2002 (Part I, Section 15):

- Black symbolises obscurantism, which must be overcome.
- Yellow represents the wealth of the country.
- Red symbolises the struggle for national liberation.
- The white star, or "the light that guides", is white to represent peace.

Flags are powerful symbols in East Timorese culture and have a high cultural significance. They play a significant role in East Timorese identification as a community. Flags are automatically attributed a symbolic power, making them a sacred object.

=== Variations ===
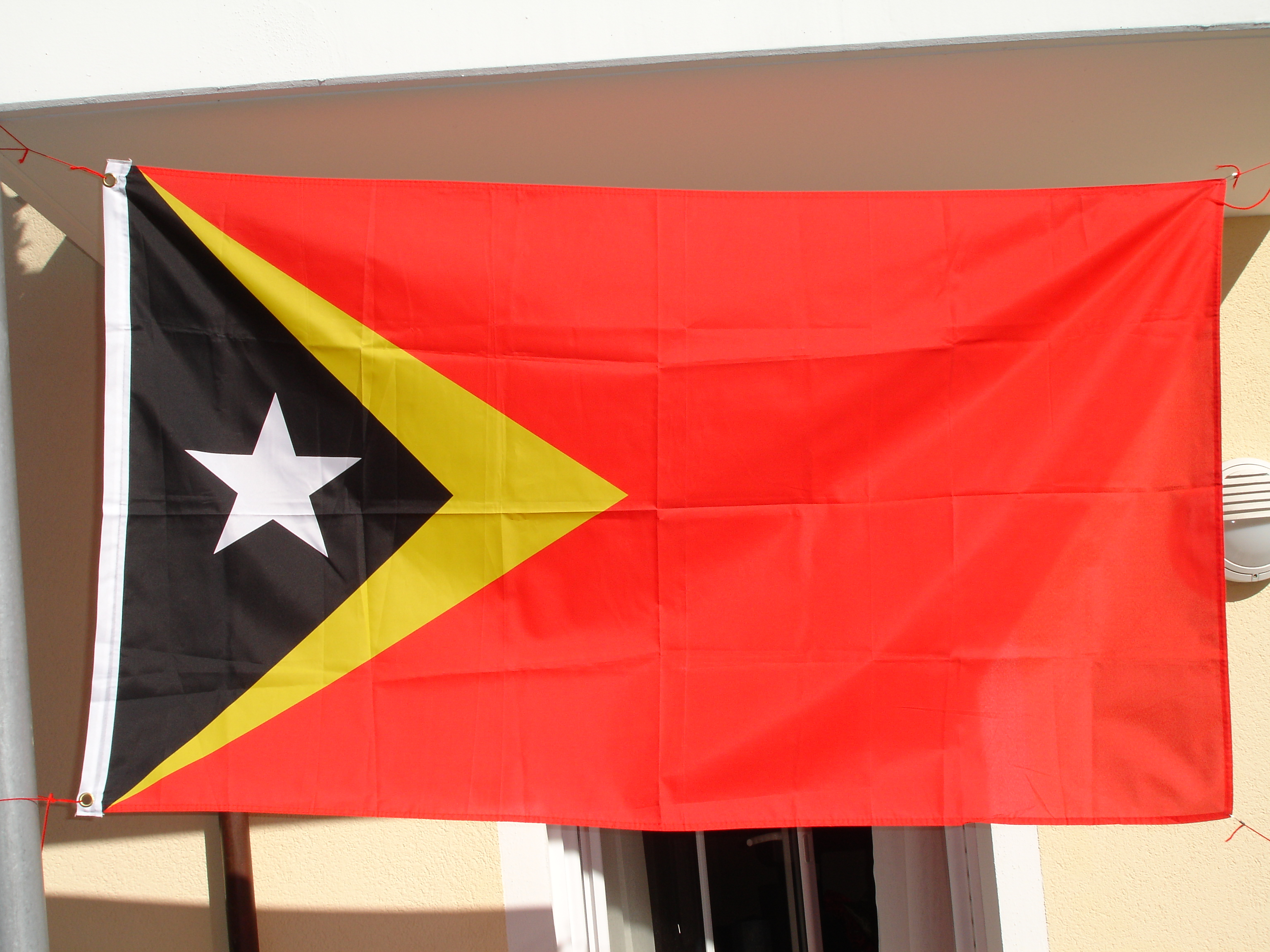
Flag of Timor-Leste (according to the flag of the Independence Ceremony with straight star)

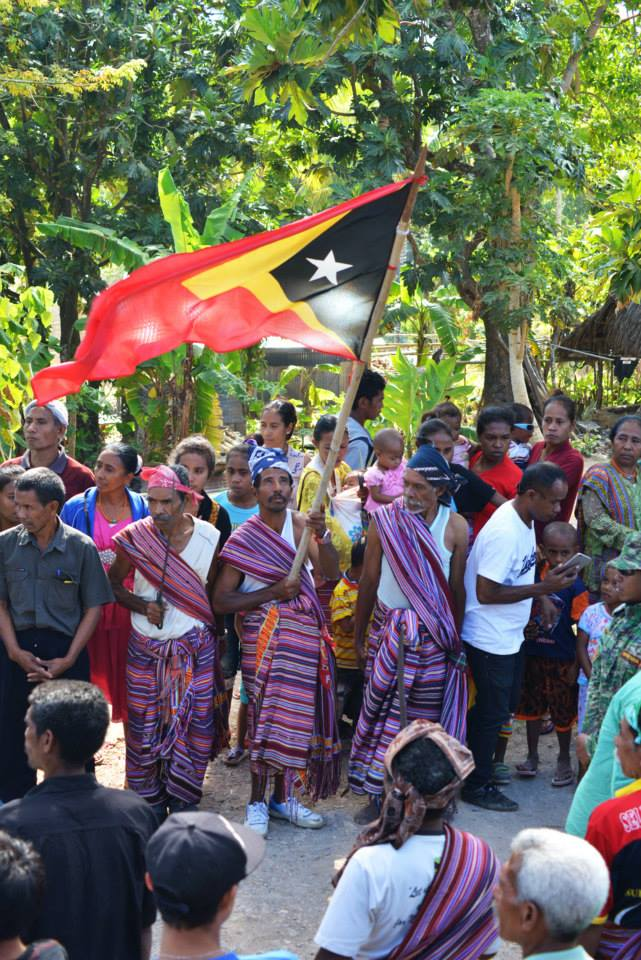
National flag in Souro

The tones of the individual colours are not precisely defined in the Constitution. The Independence Day Celebrations Committee of the United Nations Transitional Administration for East Timor (UNTAET) indicated light orange (PMS 123) as the correct shade of yellow, which is usually found on official flags. In flag illustrations in books or on the internet, but also in flags commonly used in Timor-Leste, a light yellow is also widely used. According to the UNTAET source, the red corresponds to the tone PMS 485. Here, too, there are versions with a light red in Timor-Leste. Even darker versions only appear as flag images, but not as flags. Although UNTAET gives the size of the black triangle as a quarter of the flag's length, the existing flags and illustrations all have a triangle with a size of one third.

There is disagreement about the correct proportions of the flag. While the 1975 flag always had the 2:3 ratio common in most of Europe, flags with a ratio of 1:2 also appeared in official use with the independence of Timor-Leste. The reason for this is presumably that these flags are manufactured in Australia, where the proportions of 1:2 are customary. A clear uniform regulation was initially pending, but Law 02/2007 on the national symbols shows a picture of a flag with a 1:2 ratio in the appendix. Furthermore, the law lists in Article 4 the different formats of the flag in which the cloth flag should hang in public offices, barracks, private and state schools. Type 1 consists of a cloth 45 centimetres wide, Type 2 consists of a cloth 90 centimetres wide, Type 3 135 centimetres wide and so on up to Type 7 315 centimetres wide. However, in paragraph 2, the article explicitly allows smaller and larger flags, as well as those with sizes in between, as long as the proportions are respected.

Flags are often seen with the top of the star pointing straight up. This was often the case with the 1975 flag. But today's constitution clearly states that the star should point with a tip to the upper left corner. This is also followed by the illustration in Law 02/2007.

The flag of Timor-Leste used for the independence celebration on 20 May 2002 had a straight star despite the clear specifications. It also had an aspect ratio of 1:2 and used the bright yellow in combination with the bright red.

Variants of Timor-Leste's flags

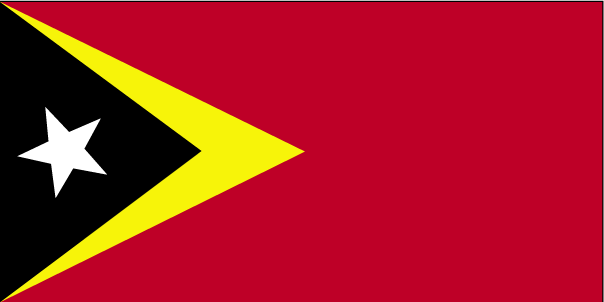
Variation with light yellow and dark red.

Historical variation with straight star and 2:3 aspect ratio

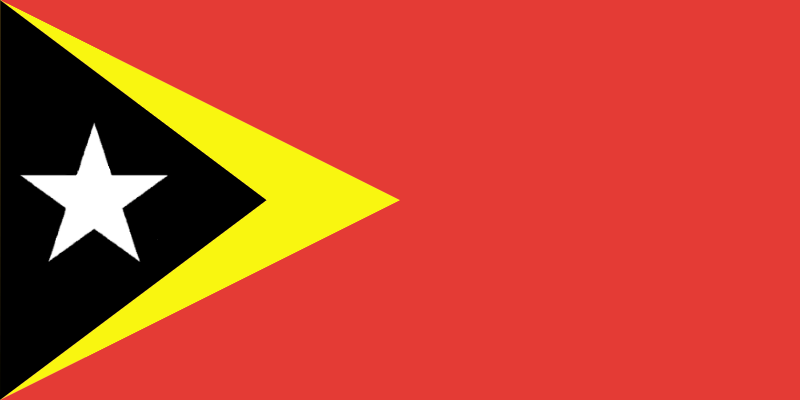
Flag of the independence
ceremony of
20 May 2002

== History ==
=== Monarchical era (1702–1910) ===
Proposed flag of Portuguese Timor (1932)

Until independence from Portugal, the colony of Portuguese Timor used only the flag of Portugal. The Liurais, the traditional rulers of Timor, drew part of their claim to rule from sacred objects (lulik) owned by the ruling families. When the Portuguese allied with the Liurais or made them vassals, they gave them Portuguese flags, which, along with the flagpoles, became sacred objects themselves, thus legitimising the rule of the Portuguese and the Liurais loyal to them. Especially in the culture of the Mambai, the flag cult took on a central significance. According to their myth of origin, the world order is created by two brothers. The elder brother, from whom the Timorese descend, holds the ritual power over the cosmos. The younger brother has the power over the social order. The non-Timorese peoples, in this case the Portuguese, are descended from this brother. The myth tells of the loss, search and recovery of a lost, sacred object, namely the Portuguese flag. This sacred meaning of the blue and white flag led to some problems when the flag of Portugal was changed in 1910 when the country changed from a monarchy to a republic.

=== Republican era (1911–1975) ===
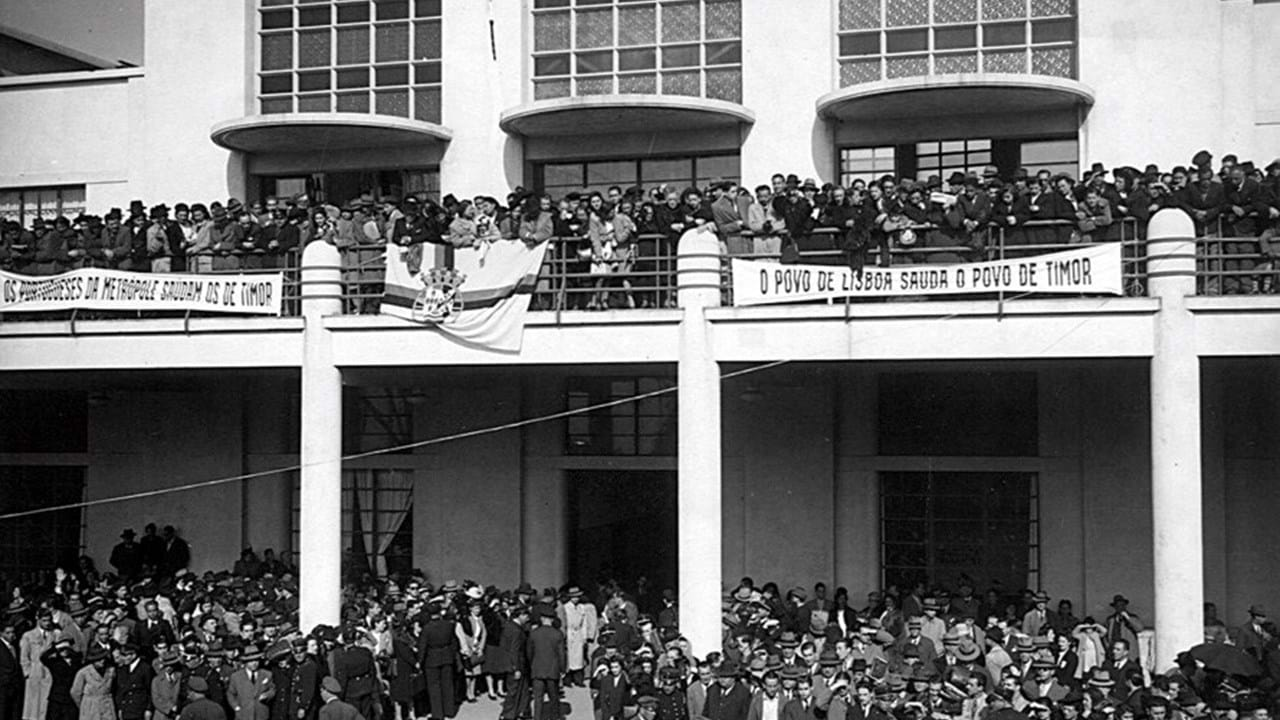
Reception for the Portuguese affected by the war in Timor on 15 February 1946

On 15 February 1946, the Angola arrived at the Portuguese naval base of Alcântara from Portuguese Timor. She brought home Portuguese who had lived in the colony during the Battle of Timor in the Second World War. A white flag with the Portuguese Timorese coat of arms on a green and red cross appears in the crowd.

In 1961, a small, left-oriented Timorese resistance movement - the Bureau de Luta pela Libertação de Timor (BLLT) - used a flag that already had some elements of today's national flag. It consisted of a yellow-bordered black disc with a five-pointed white star on red cloth. Later, the BLLT established a short-lived government-in-exile in Jakarta called the United Republic of Timor, which used the same flag.

In 1967, there were proposals for separate flags for the individual Portuguese colonies, with the coat of arms of the colony added to the lower right of the flag of Portugal. However, the proposals were never implemented.

==== Portugal's last flag over East Timor ====
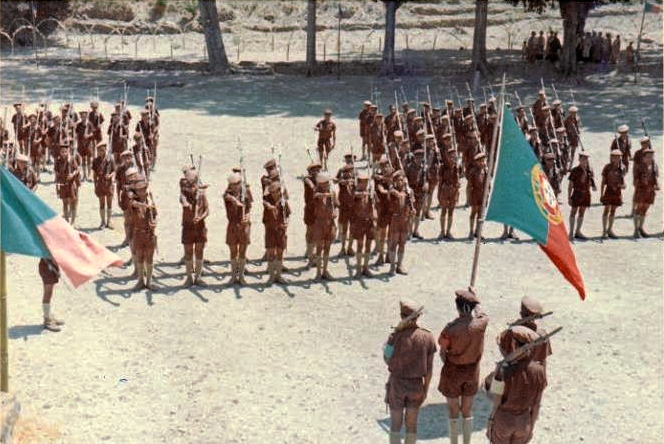
Colonial soldiers at the 1968 flag-raising ceremony in Portuguese Timor

After the Carnation Revolution in 1974, Portugal prepared its colonies for independence. However, civil war broke out in Portuguese Timor in August 1975 between the left-leaning Fretilin and the conservative Timorese Democratic Union (UDT). Portugal's governor Mário Lemos Pires was forced to evacuate all Portuguese administrative and military personnel and their families to the island of Atauro off the coast of the capital Dili on 26 and 27 August. In the end, the Fretilin prevailed in the battle. Pires was urged by them to return to Dili and press ahead with decolonization, but he insisted on waiting for instructions from Lisbon. It was not until October that the Portuguese corvette Afonso Cerqueira reached Atauro, bringing Pires his first sign of support from Portugal. Indonesia took advantage of the situation to infiltrate and occupy the areas near the Portuguese-Timorese border with troops. On 7 December, Indonesia began the open invasion and occupation of Dili and the rest of the territory. After the evacuation of the Portuguese personnel to Atauro, the Portuguese flag continued to fly over the Governor's Palace in Dili. Only on the day of the declaration of independence by the Fretilin was the flag taken down by the Falintil commander Jaime Camacho Amaral and replaced by the new flag of East Timor. The whereabouts of this Portuguese flag are not known.

However, the Portuguese flag continued to fly on Atauro, where Pires had retreated to. It was not until 30 December 1975 that Indonesian troops occupied Atauro. In an official military ceremony attended by Indonesian and local Portuguese soldiers under the command of Ensign (alferes) David Ximenes, the flag of Portugal was taken down and replaced by the flag of Indonesia. At their request, the Portuguese flag was handed over to Guilherme de Sousa, a primary school teacher and UDT deputy from Atauro, and Luís Amaral, the head of administration (chefe de posto) of Atauro. The following day, Pires and the Portuguese community left the colony from Atauro on board two Portuguese warships. The UDT was cooperating with the Indonesian occupation at the time. UDT members brought the flag, escorted by Indonesian soldiers, to Dili and handed it over to UDT President Francisco Lopes da Cruz. From 1976 to 1982, Lopes da Cruz was the Indonesian deputy governor of occupied East Timor. Lopes da Cruz then moved to Jakarta and became special advisor on East Timor to Indonesia's dictator Suharto. Lopes da Cruz took the flag with him. Although there were repeated calls for the flag to be handed over to a museum or the Indonesian National Archives, Lopes da Cruz refused to hand it over. Finally, Suharto decided that Lopes da Cruz could keep the flag and gave him a special suitcase with the insignia of the President of the Republic of Indonesia to keep the flag in as a sign of his loyalty. Lopes da Cruz later served as Indonesia's ambassador to Greece and Portugal. In contrast to the last flags of the other six colonies that Portugal lost or relinquished into independence from 1961, the whereabouts of the Timorese flag of Portugal remained unknown to the public for a long time. It was only in 2015 that Lopes da Cruz presented it to journalists. He regards the flag as a "relic" and keeps it in a small room of its own, together with Suharto's suitcase and a crucifix about one meter high, which Lopes da Cruz bought in Fátima in 1994.

=== First independent state (1974–1975) ===
Flag of Timor-Leste in a 2:3 ratio as it was used in 1975

After the Carnation Revolution in Portugal, parties were also allowed in Portuguese Timor. East Timor's dominant leftist party, the Frente Revolucionária de Timor-Leste Independente (Fretilin) used the same colours as the BLLT in its party flag and also the white star on a black background. Apart from their political orientation, there are no links between the two organisations. To what extent the flag served as a model or simply common socialist symbols, such as the five-pointed star and the colour red, were used on the party flag is not clear. According to legend, the resistance fighter Natalino Leitão designed the current national flag based on the Fretilin flag the night before the proclamation of independence from Portugal on 28 November 1975. The incipient occupation of the country by Indonesia had put the Fretilin on the spot. Today, 28 November is Timor-Leste's bank holidays, when official buildings are flagged. Only nine days after the declaration of independence, Indonesia openly started to invade East Timor. Natalino Leitão was killed in the process.

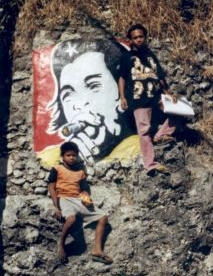
Che Guevara in the Timorese national colours in Baucau, Timor-Leste

The declaration of independence was only recognised by a few countries. Politically, Indonesia was supported by the United States and Australia, as they feared a second Cuba due to the leftist orientation of Fretilin. The extent to which the red basic colour and the certain similarity of the flag design to Cuba's flag supported this assumption is debatable. That the flag of Cuba or the flag of Mozambique were models for Leitão's triangular design can only be assumed. At least there were and still are sympathies for Cuba and especially for Ernesto Che Guevara in Timor-Leste. Fretilin already had close relations with Mozambique and its ruling party FRELIMO.

Socialist pile flags

Flag of FRELIMO

Flag of Mozambique

Flag of Cuba

=== Indonesian occupation (1975–1999) ===
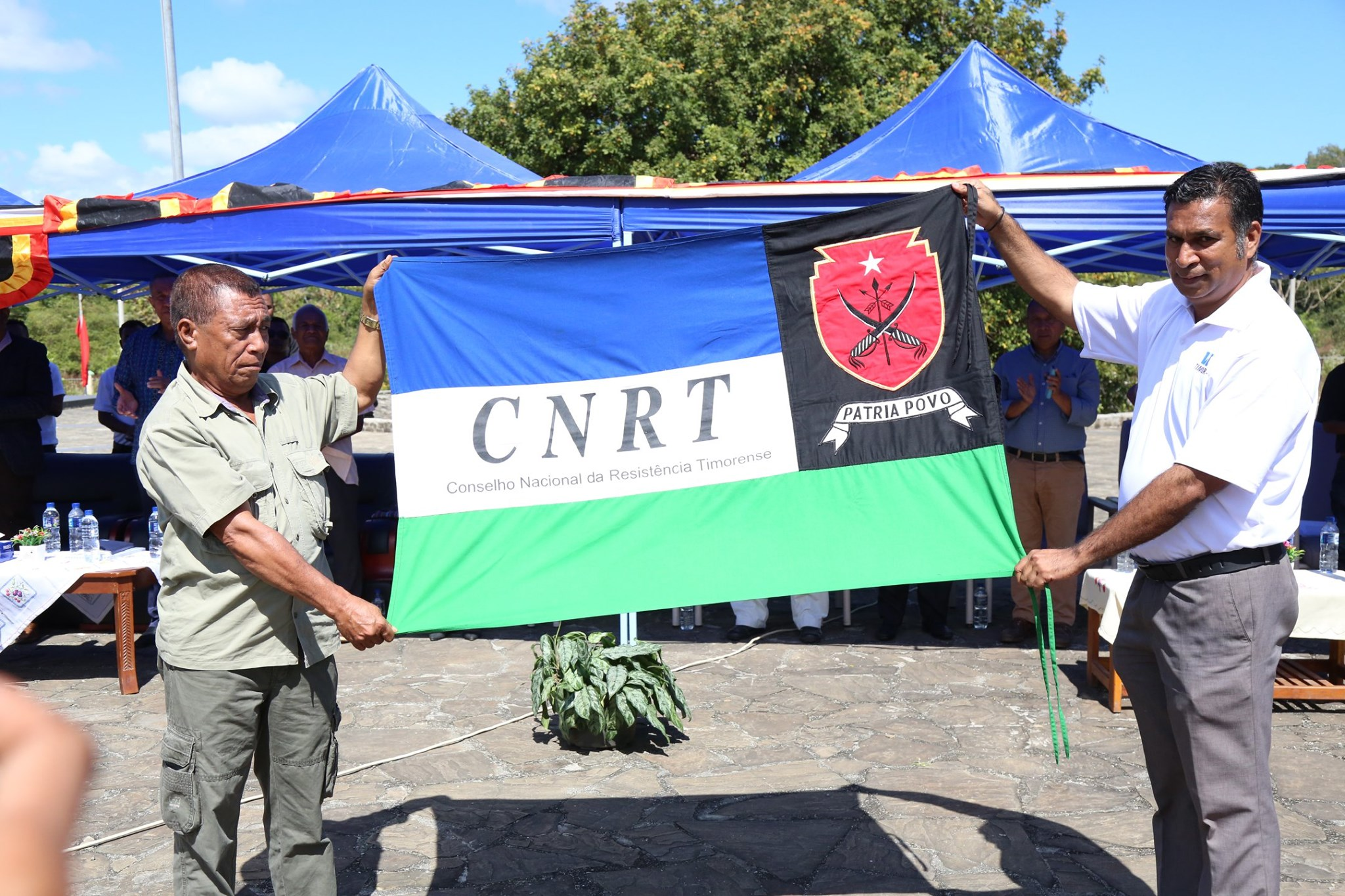
Variant of the flag of the National Council of Maubere Resistance with the full name of the organisation

Beyond party political affiliation, the flag of the Fretilin became more and more a symbol of the organisation of resistance for the people during the occupation, and the national flag of 1975 a symbol of the people and their urge for independence. The occupation forces reacted to the use of the flags with severe repression. The use of flags other than the flag of Indonesia was forbidden. Until 1999, East Timor was governed by Indonesia as a province, while internationally it was considered a "dependent territory under Portuguese administration". As an Indonesian province, it was also given a provincial flag, but this was only used in the governor's office, as was customary with all provincial flags. The flag of Timor Timur, as Timor-Leste was officially called at the time, displayed the provincial coat of arms on an orange background. When a Portuguese parliamentary delegation was due to visit East Timor in 1989, the Indonesian government distributed 30,000 Indonesian flags to be placed on the homes of Dili. This was intended to demonstrate the integration of East Timor into Indonesia.

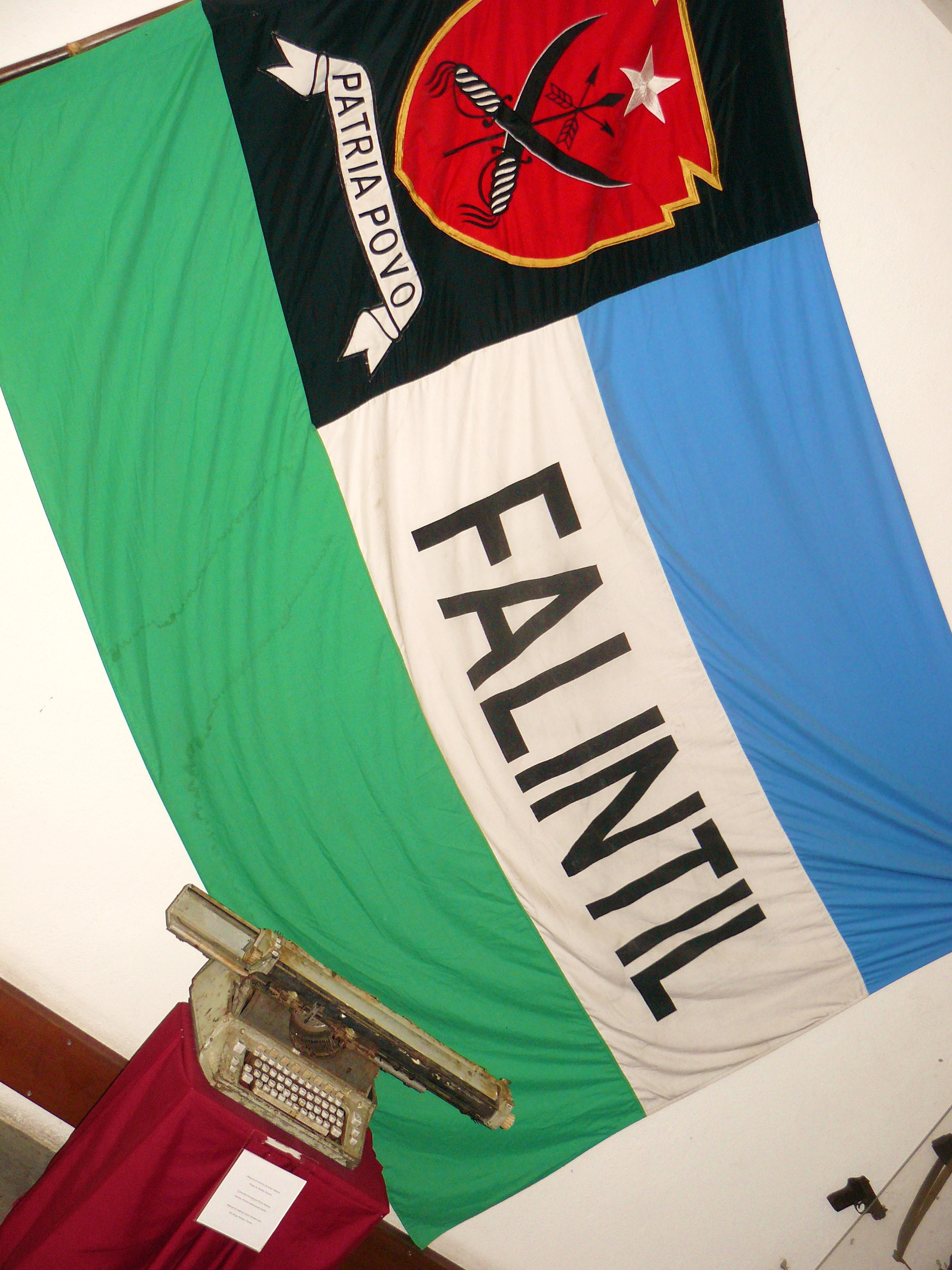
Variant of the flag of Falintil in the National Museum of the Resistance

The armed resistance against the Indonesians was led by Falintil, which was originally the military arm of Fretilin. In 1987, its leader Xanana Gusmão transformed Falintil into a national army of East Timorese resistance. He designed a new blue-white-green-black flag of the Falintil. The Conselho Nacional de Resistência Timorense (CNRT), the umbrella organisation of East Timorese resistance founded in 1998, adopted the Falintil flag as a politically neutral symbol. They replaced the lettering "FALINTIL" with "CNRT" and changed the symbols in the shield. The Falintil used a yellow five-pointed star, two traditional swords (suriks) and three feathers. The CNRT used a spear and two arrows instead of the feathers, and the star was now white. The Falintil adopted this version of the coat of arms for its flag relatively soon. The shield in the flag of the CNRT is also found in slightly modified form with the same elements in the later first coat of arms of Timor-Leste (2002-2006) after the restoration of independence. In the Falintil camps, it was strictly forbidden to walk through the shadow of the flag. Allegedly, this rule dates back to colonial times, when Timorese were beaten up if they walked through the shadow of the flag of Portugal.

In the 1999 independence referendum in East Timor, the population could choose between full independence and remaining part of Indonesia as the Special Autonomous Region of East Timor (SARET). Article 20 of SARET's draft constitution provided for the possibility of adopting its own coat of arms, but not its own flag. Instead, the flag of Indonesia was to continue to be used.

=== Contemporary era (1990–present) ===
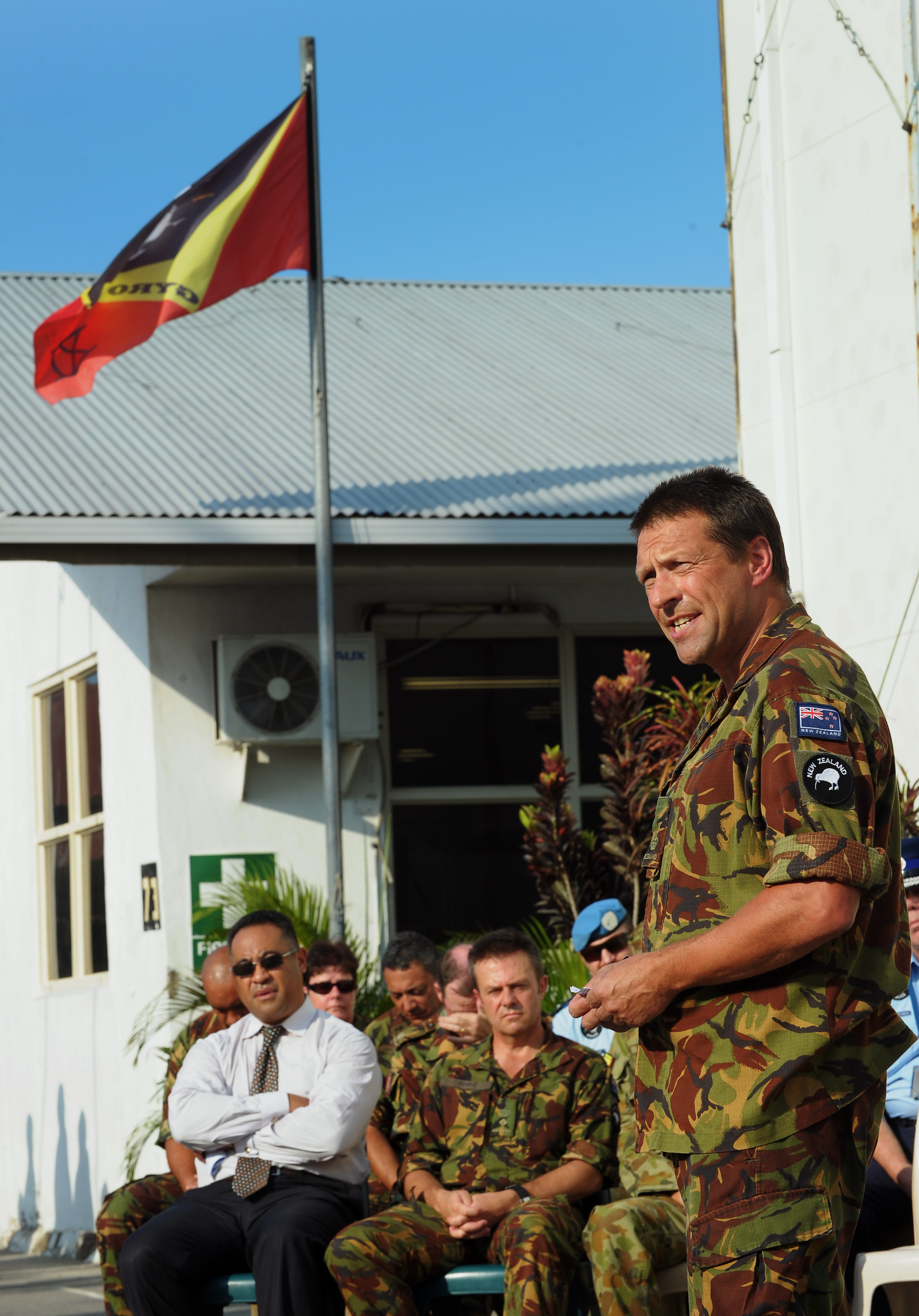
International Stabilization Force flag

When the United Nations took control in East Timor after the referendum, they used the United Nations flag. At the Sydney Olympics in 2000, four East Timorese athletes participated as Independent Olympic Athletes under the flag of the Olympic Games, as Timor-Leste was not yet independent and there was no National Olympic Committee.

The flag of Timor-Leste was adopted in 2002. It is the same as the flag that was originally adopted when the country declared its independence from Portugal in 1975, nine days before being invaded by Indonesia. At midnight on 19 May 2002, and during the first moments of Independence Day the next day, the United Nations flag was lowered and the flag of an independent Timor-Leste was raised. The flag was officially reinstated on 20 May 2002, when the United Nations flag was taken down at midnight and the East Timorese flag was hoisted. According to the various local accounts, people were in tears for days and produced a special hand woven textile (Tais) in which to wrap the downed UN flag, as if it was a death shroud, but also to protect it and to preserve its mystical ‘sacred’ power (luli). This flag became a symbol of liberation and protection for the Timorese.

After independence, every village in the country received a copy of the new national flag, which was handed over to them in a solemn ceremony. Consciously or unconsciously, this follows the Portuguese tradition of handing over the Portuguese flag to the vassals.

During the celebrations of the seventh anniversary of independence on 20 May 2009, the national flag fell to the ground. Many Timorese saw this as a bad omen. At the flag-raising ceremony in 2002, the flag did not flutter in the wind and violent riots broke out a few months later. The opposition party Fretilin saw the renewed incident as a sign that the government was in trouble, and one of the country's biggest newspapers, the Timor Post, reported the event on its front page.

Since 1 August 2011, the national flag has been placed in front of public institutions on the first Monday of every month. Likewise on 2 February (Timor Leste Defence Forces Day FDTL), 27 March (Timor-Leste National Police Day PNTL) and 20 August (FALINTIL Day). The flag is always raised at 8 am, with employees and officials of the institution all present and singing the national anthem.

In 2016, MPs Manuel Castro, Manuel Guterres, and Natalino dos Santos Nascimento criticised the fact that more people were writing on the flag, for example with signatures. In the view of the politicians, this is a "crime" against which the police should take action. The flag, which had been bought "with bones and blood", was thereby desecrated.

== Alternative flag debate ==
Flag of the CNRT (semi-official flag of East Timor 1998-2002)

Flag of Fretilin

A different flag had been suggested by the representatives of the Timorese political parties and organisations during the first East Timorese National Convention held in April 1998 in Portugal. This flag was originally the flag of CNRT (Conselho Nacional de Resistência Timorense, National Council of Timorese Resistance). Because of CNRT's popularity, there was a consensus of the participants of the convention to adopt their flag as a temporary flag for Timor-Leste. It was replaced by the former design of 1975 in 2002.

A discussion began about which flag a future, independent Timor-Leste should use. There were voices calling for the national flag to be changed, as the 1975 flag was a symbol of Fretilin. Already at the first East Timorese National Convention in Peniche (Portugal) from 23 to 27 April 1998, the delegates of the Timorese parties decided in favour of the flag of the CNRT as the provisional flag of Timor-Leste. In the 1999 referendum on independence, the UN had accordingly depicted on the ballot papers the Indonesian flag for remaining with Indonesia and the flag of the CNRT for independence as a decision-making aid. The veterans' organisation CPD-RDTL accused Fretilin of monopolising the current national flag. The group Colimau 2000 demanded that a Christian cross be included in the national flag to symbolise the importance of Catholicism in Timor-Leste. However, most parties and the majority of the population do not support a change. They saw the national flag as a symbol of suffering in the struggle for independence, regardless of its authorship.

At demonstrations in and outside Timor-Leste, almost only the old 1975 flag and the Fretilin flag were displayed. The very similarity of the two flags was recognised in respect for the merits of Fretilin in the struggle for independence. So in the end, the flag of 1975 was used. Another reason was probably the overwhelming majority of Fretilin in the new parliament. The Socialist Party of Timor (PST) had also demanded the red-yellow-black flag. The flag of the CNRT, as a symbol of the unity of the East Timorese, did not have the same popular support in the end. The Timor Leste Defence Force (F-FDTL), which absorbed the FALINTIL, now use the FALINTIL flag and coat of arms in the spear-and-arrows version.

== Other flags ==
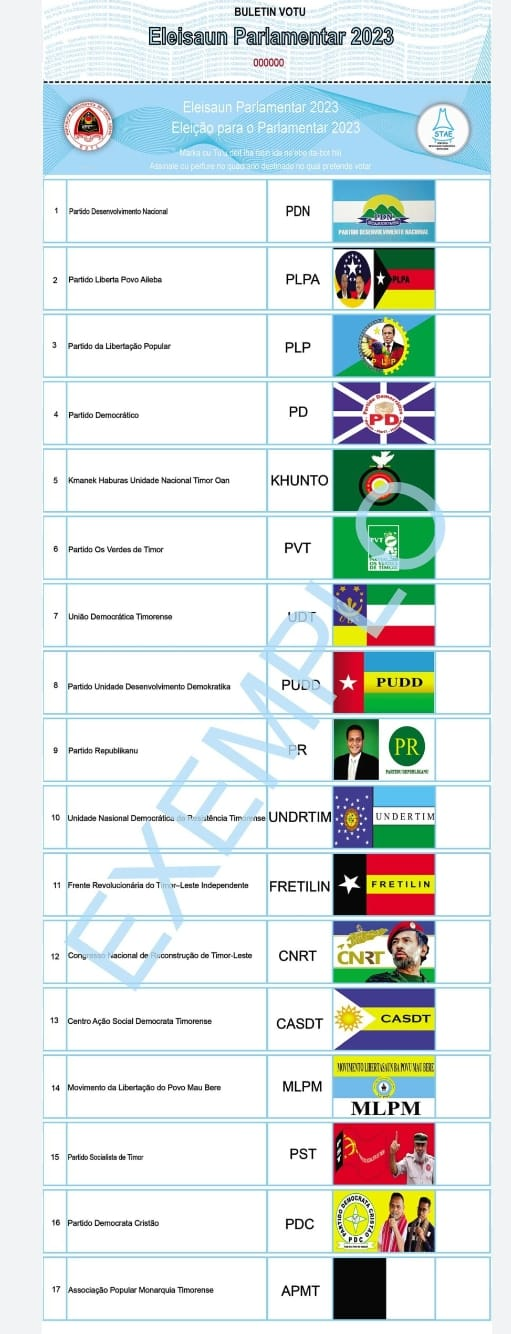
Sample ballot paper for the parliamentary elections with the flags of the parties running

Over the last few years, more and more flags of authorities, schools and other institutions have appeared. Usually they are single-coloured flags with the logo or coat of arms of the organisations. The country's football clubs also adorn themselves with logos and flags.

The flags of Timor-Leste's political parties are diverse. They serve as advertising media at political events and were also depicted for illiterate people as an identifying sign on the ballot papers for the parliamentary elections on 30 June 2007. The importance of party flags for supporters was made clear by three incidents that took place during the unrest following the 2007 general election. At that time, Fretilin supporters had hung their flags in their eastern strongholds as a sign of protest against the new government. Australian troops then allegedly denigrated and stole three Fretilin flags as souvenirs. The Australian commander, Brigadier John Hutcheson, personally returned one of the flags and expressed regret over the incident. The other two flags were returned through other authorities. Fretilin Secretary General Alkatiri nevertheless called for the withdrawal of the Australians, saying they were no longer neutral.

In Catholic processions and celebrations, one sees blue-white and yellow-white flags, the latter sometimes with red crosses. Blue and white (as also found on the former flag of Portugal) are the traditional colours of Our Lady of the Conception (Nossa Senhora da Conceição). Mary is considered the patron saint of the country. Yellow and white are the colours of the Catholic Church (see also: Flag of Vatican City).

The veterans' organisation CPD-RDTL originally displayed the national flag of Timor-Leste at its demonstrations. However, at the end of 2012, flags were used whose design was reminiscent of the flag of the Bureau de Luta pela Libertação de Timor in 1961.

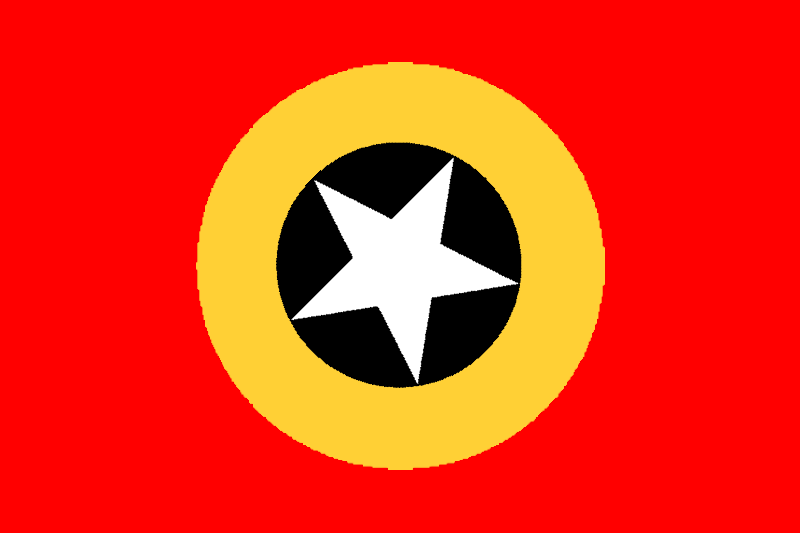
CPD-RDTL

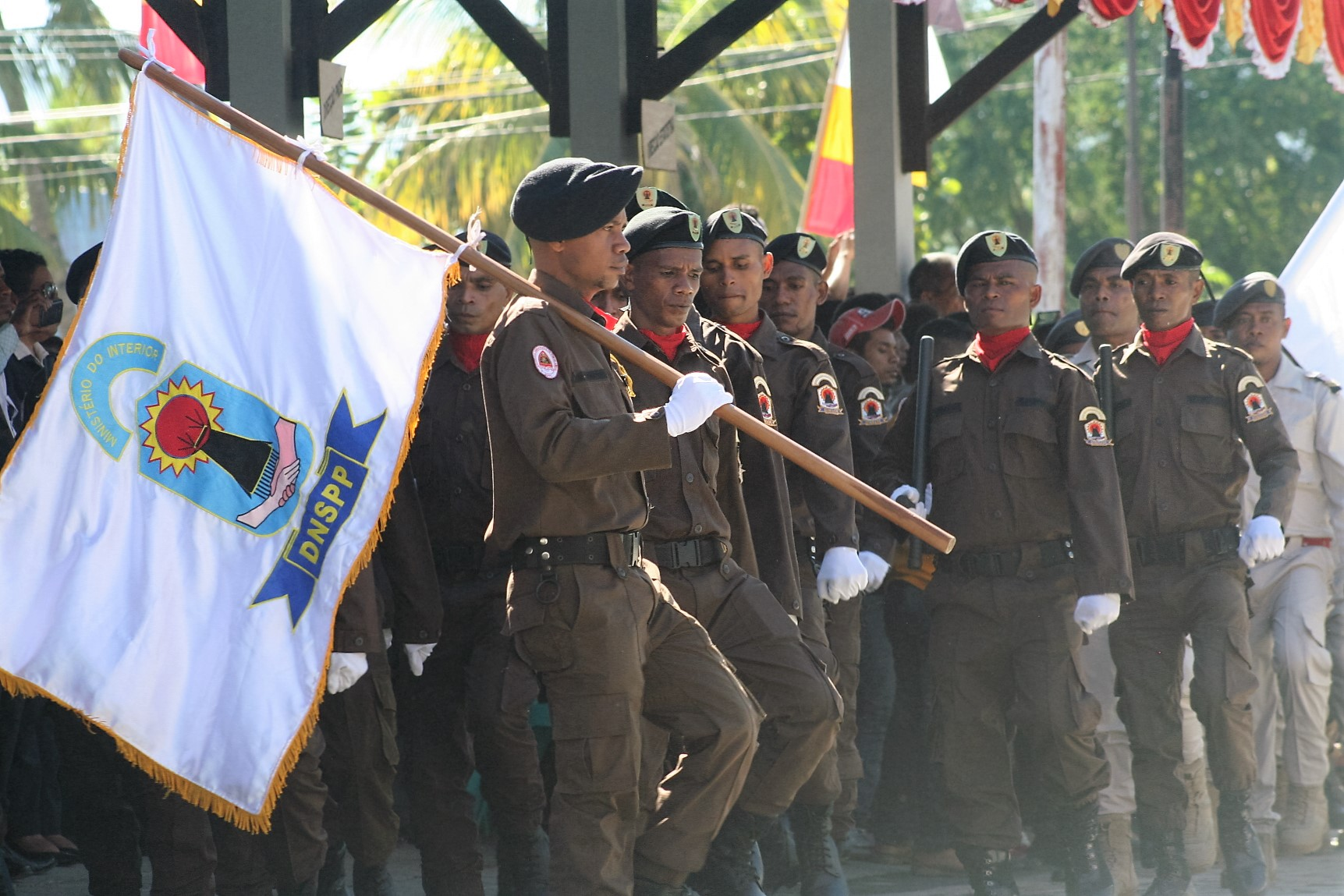
National Directorate Partimonho Public Service

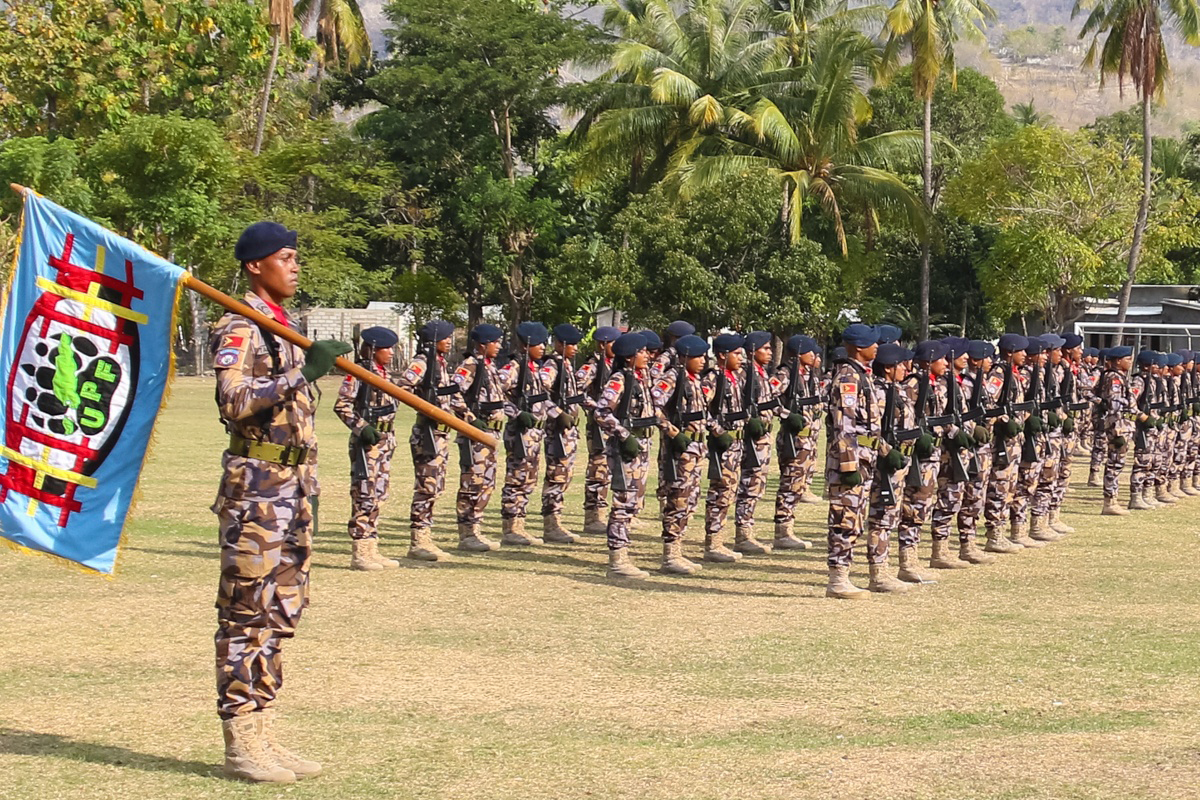
Unidade de Patrulhamento de Fronteira

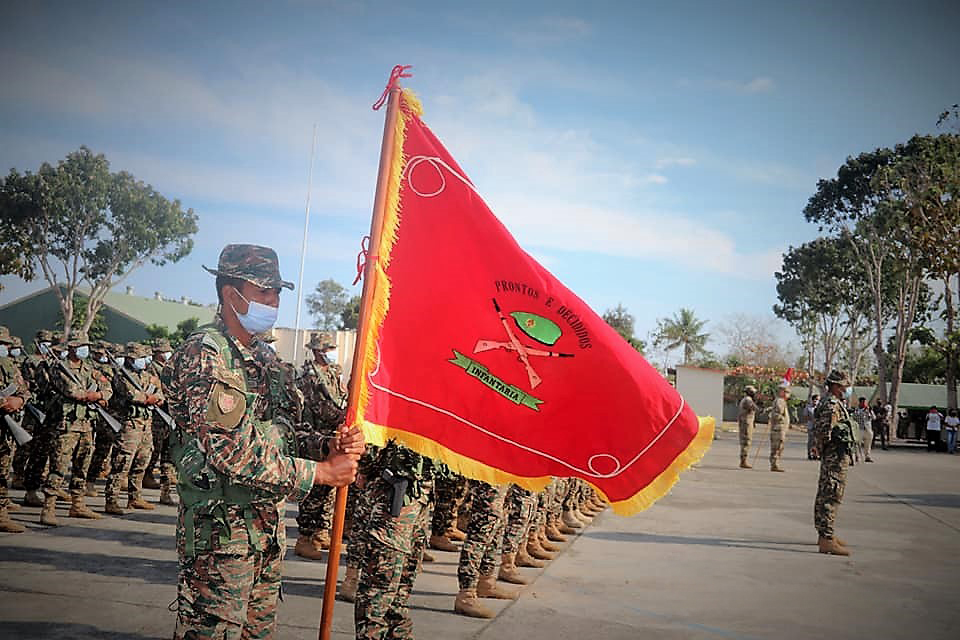
Timor-Leste Land Forces flag

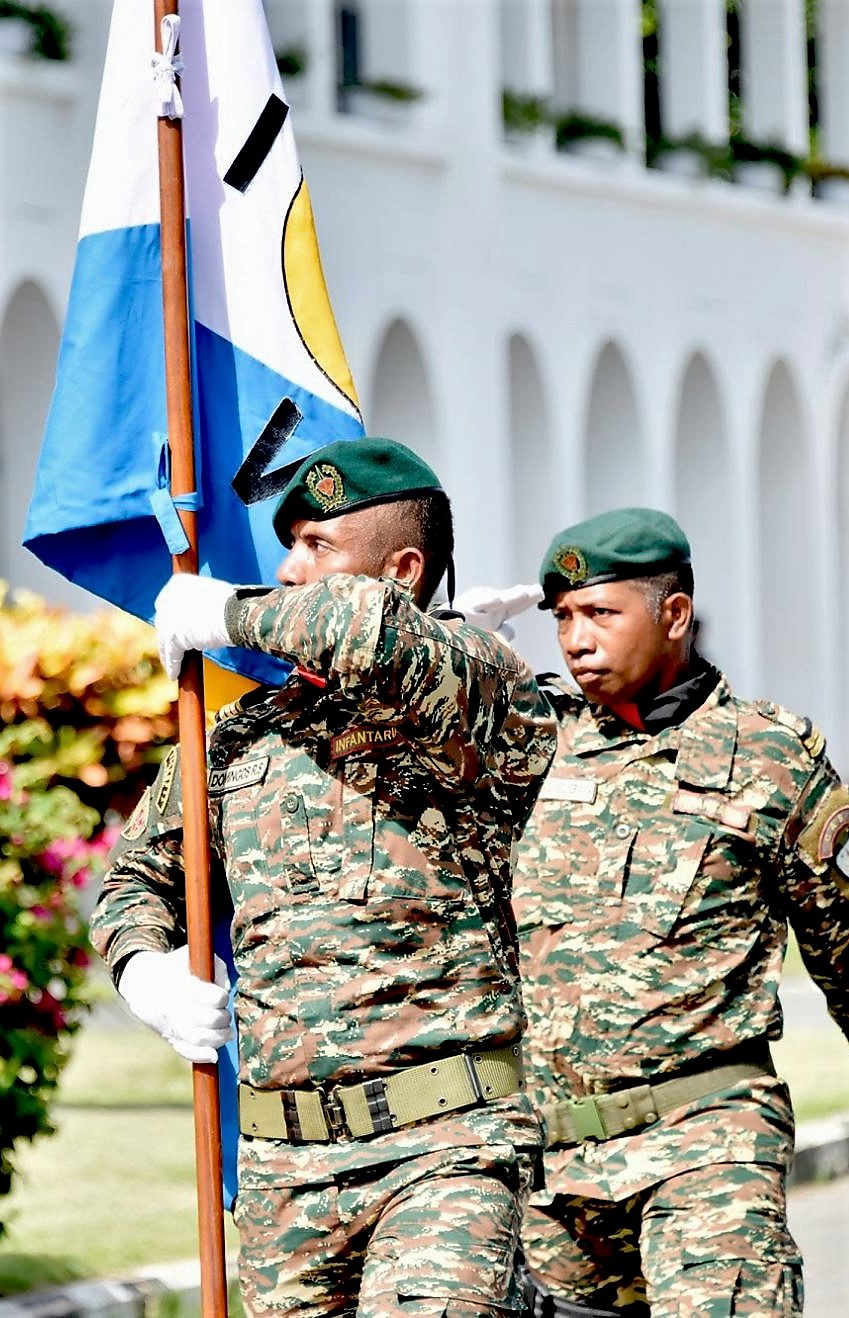
Infantry flag

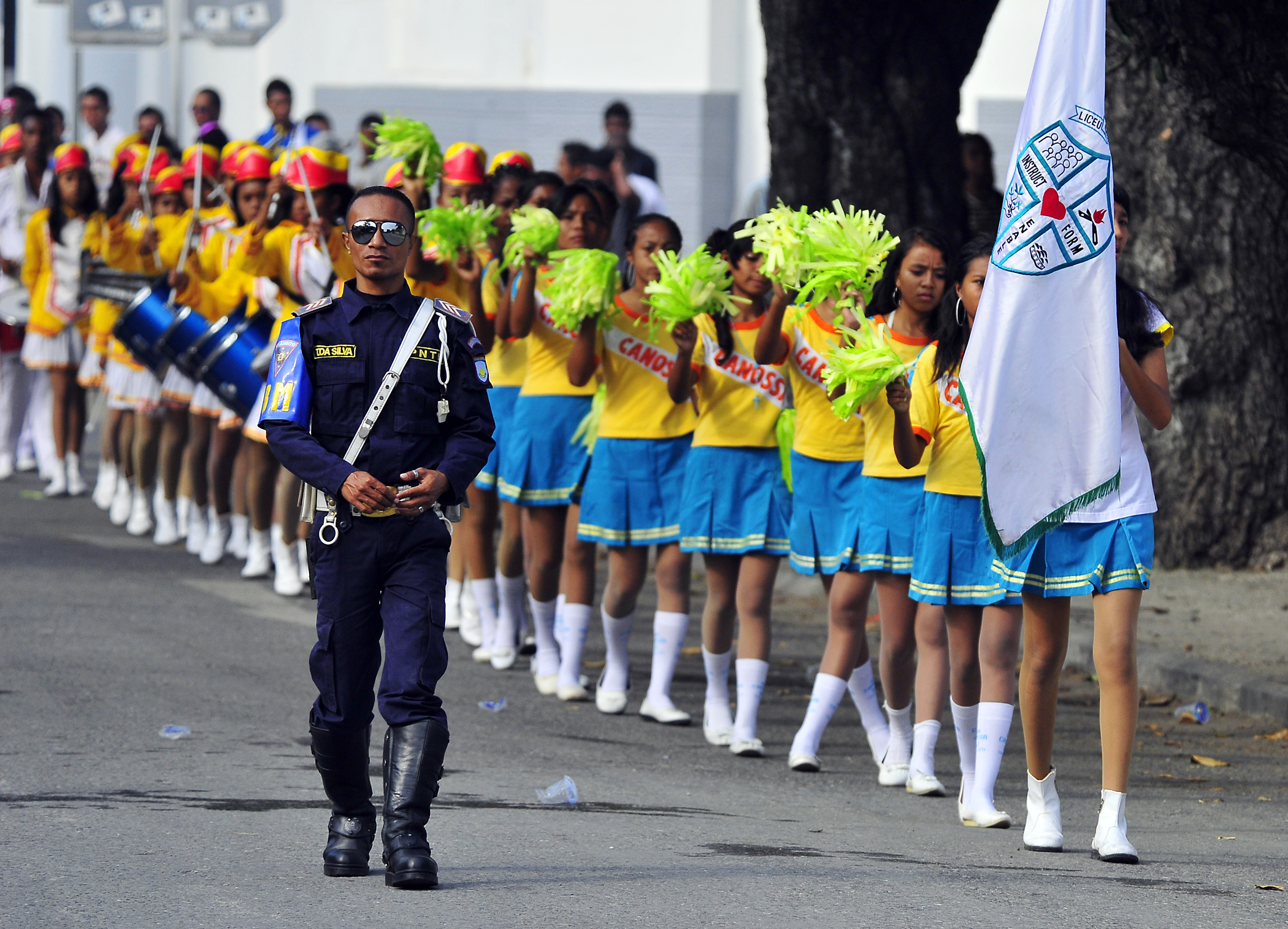
School flag of the Liceu Canossa Comoro

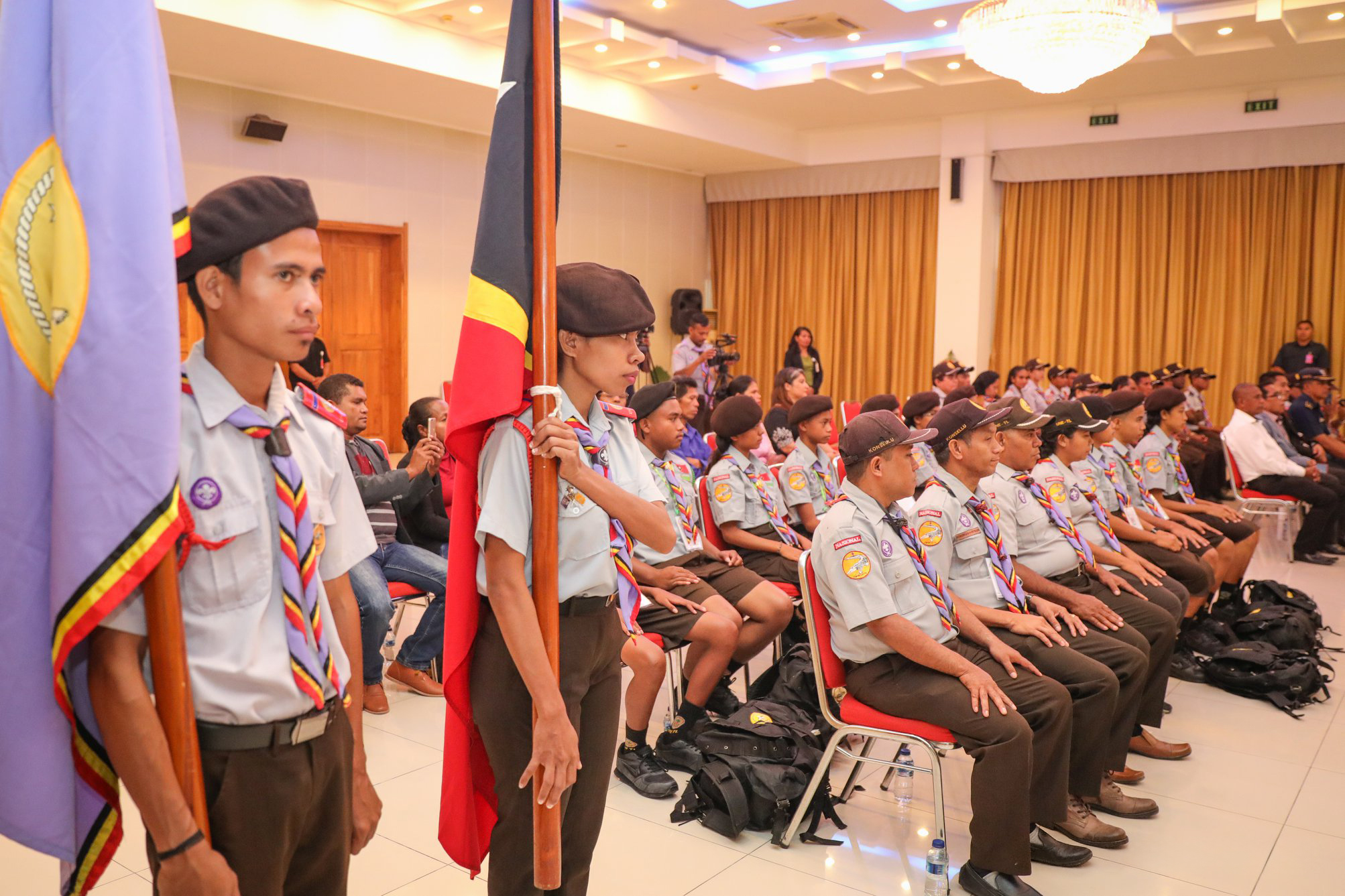
União Nacional dos Escuteiros de Timor-Leste Flag

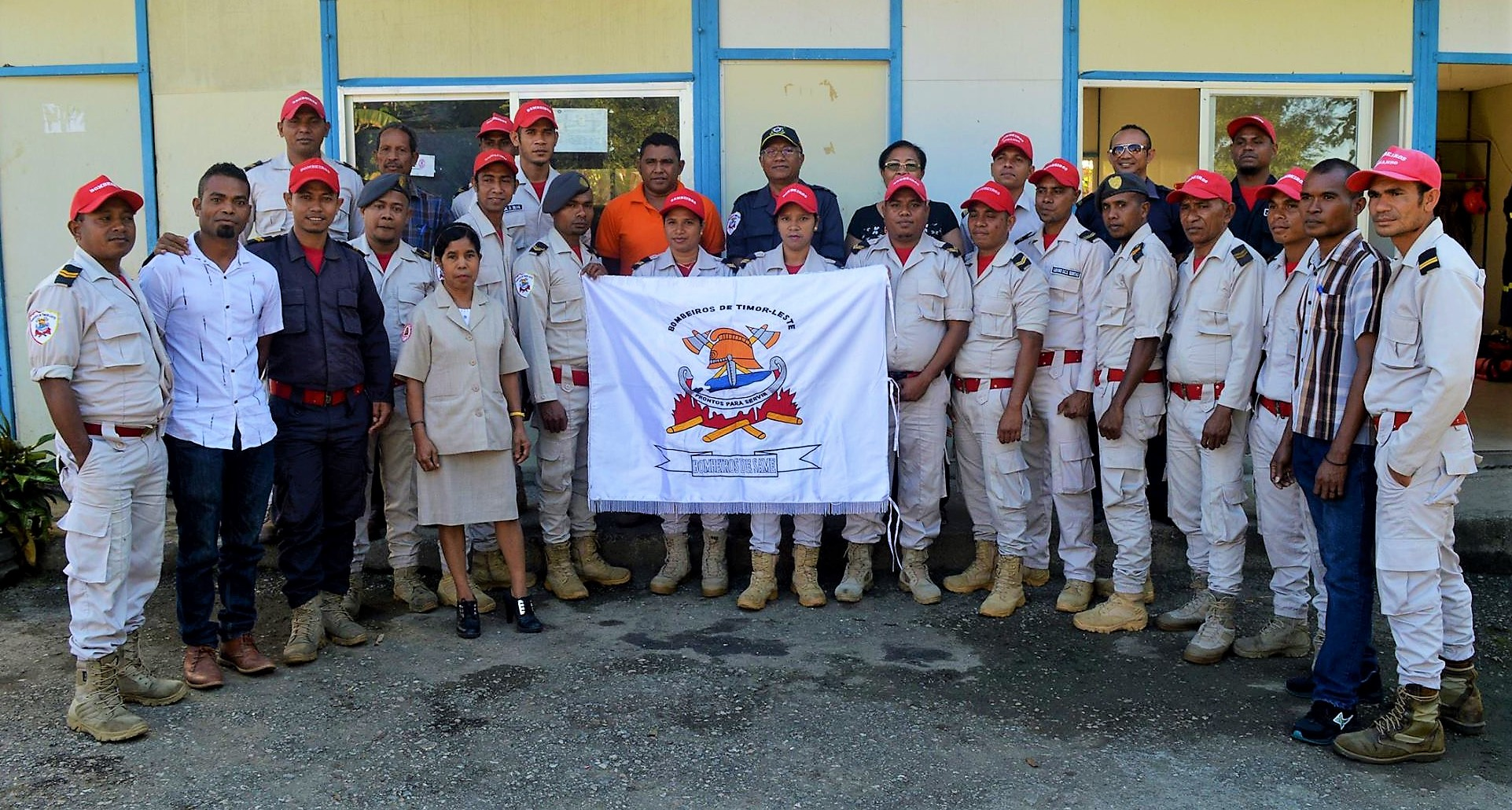
Fire brigade in Same

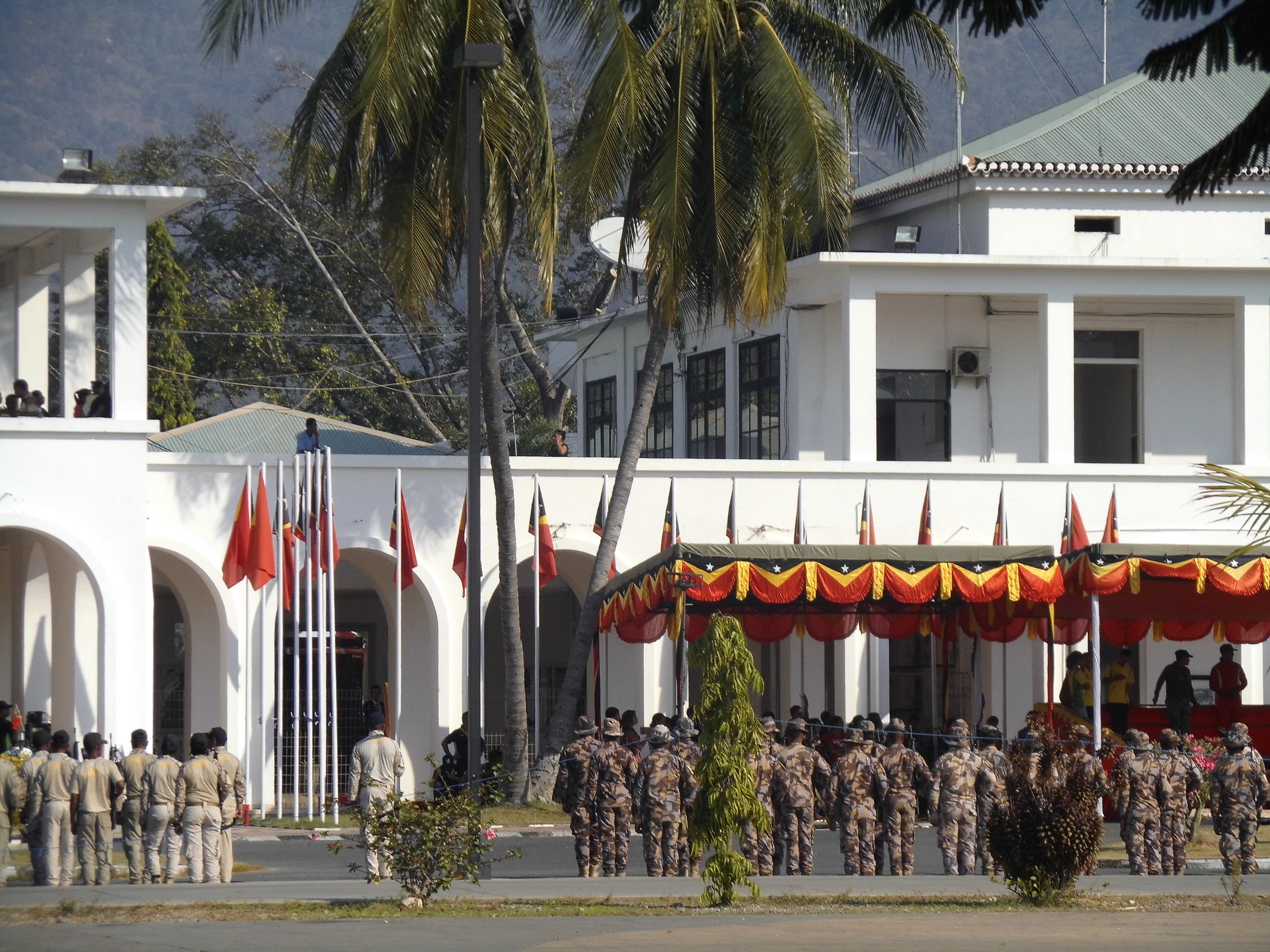
Decoration in the shape of the national flag

== Gallery ==
The flag of Portugal, as adopted in 1667, was used in Portuguese Timor 1702–1707

The flag of Portugal, as adopted in 1707, was used in Portuguese Timor 1707–1750

The flag of Portugal, as adopted in 1750, was used in Portuguese Timor 1750–1816

The flag of Portugal, as adopted in 1816, was used in Portuguese Timor 1816–1830

The national flag of Portugal, as adopted in 1830, was used in Portuguese Timor 1830–1910

The flag of Portugal, adopted in 1910, was used in Portuguese Timor 1910–1975

1932 proposal for a flag of Portuguese Timor (never adopted)

Flag of Japan used in during Japan's occupation of Portuguese Timor (1942–1945)

Flag of Timor's Portuguese refugees flown in Lisbon after the occupation (1946)

Flag of the Bureau de Luta pela Libertação de Timor and the United Republic of Timor (1961)

1965 proposal for a flag of Portuguese Timor (never adopted)

Flag of Indonesia used by the Provisional Government of East Timor (1975-1976) and during the Indonesian occupation. (1976-1999)

Provincial flag of Timor Timur (1976–1999)

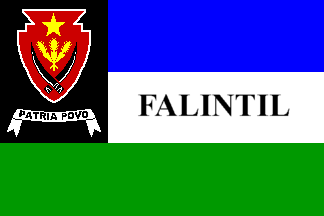
first version of the flag of the FALINTIL

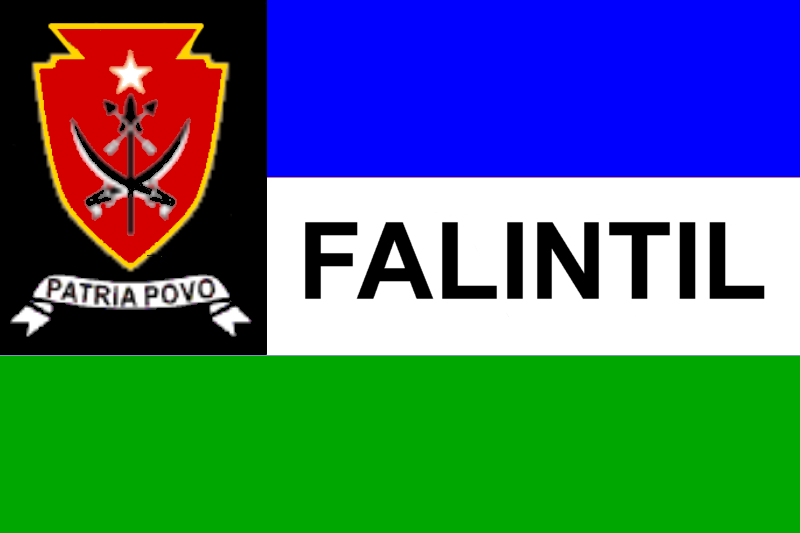
Flag of the F-FDTL

The Flag of the United Nations, used by East Timor under UN administration (1999–2002)

Flag of the Independent Olympic Athletes 2000

== Subnational flags ==
Flag of Dili until 1975

Some of the Municipalities of Timor-Leste have adopted their own flags. Originally, Timor-Leste's municipalities did not have their own flags. However, during the colonial period between 1962 and 1975, Dili was the only place in Portuguese Timor to have a municipal flag that corresponded in design to the Portuguese municipal flags. It was green and white with eight stripes and showed the town's coat of arms in the centre: Red, a sandalwood tree in silver between two bundles of arrows with halberds and hunting spears. Above the escutcheon, a brick crown with five towers representing Dili's status as the capital of an overseas province. In addition, a banner with the words "O Sol logo em nascendo vê primeiro" (Where the sun was first born). As a sign of solidarity, Dili's flag was hung in Lisbon's city hall in 1991.

Since 2015, the municipalities have adopted logos and coats of arms as symbols, which are then also presented on flags with a single-colour background. For example, the Oe-Cusse Ambeno Special Administrative Region has a green flag with a logo and the municipality of Manufahi has an orange flag with its coat of arms. Baucau displays its coat of arms on a white background.

Municipalities Logo and Flags of Timor-Leste

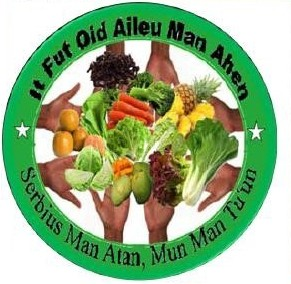
Logo of Aileu

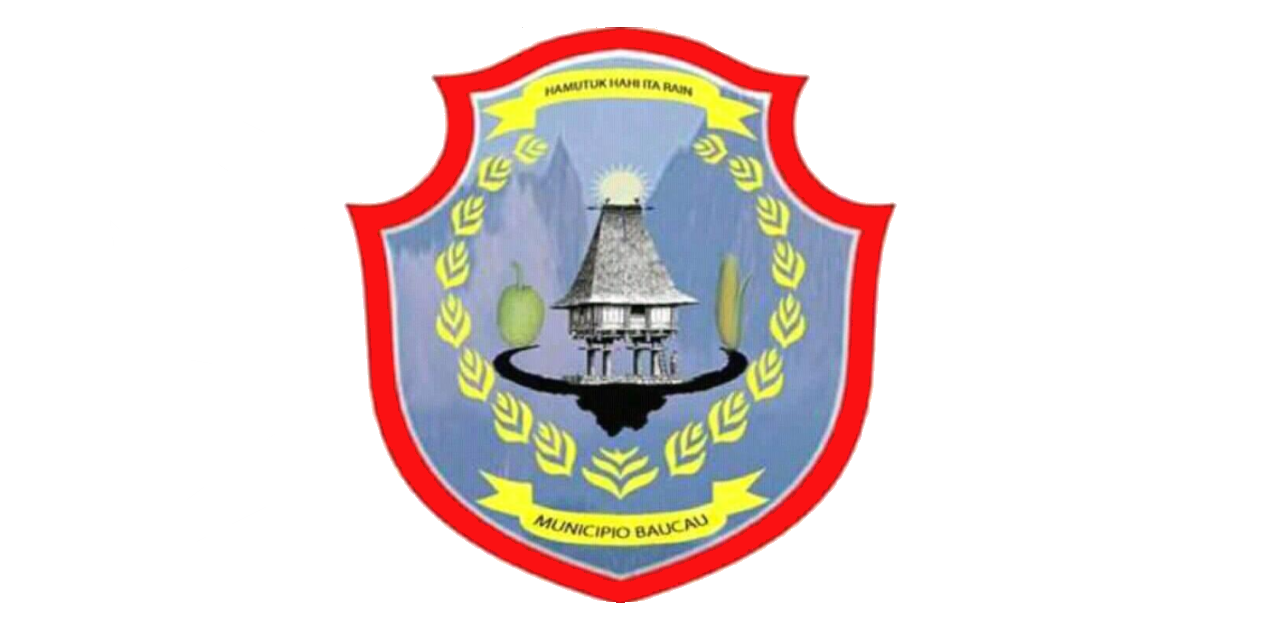
Flag of Baucau

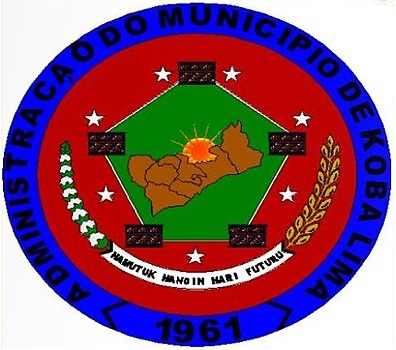
Logo of Cova Lima in Tetum and Portuguese

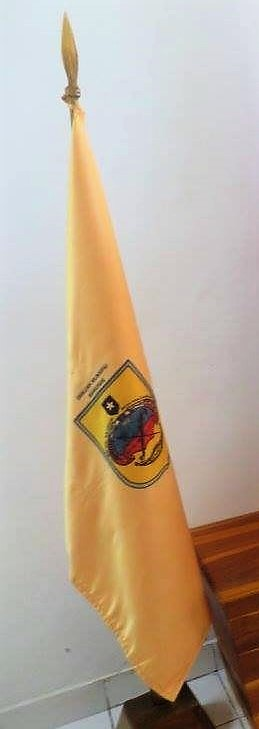
Flag of Manufahi

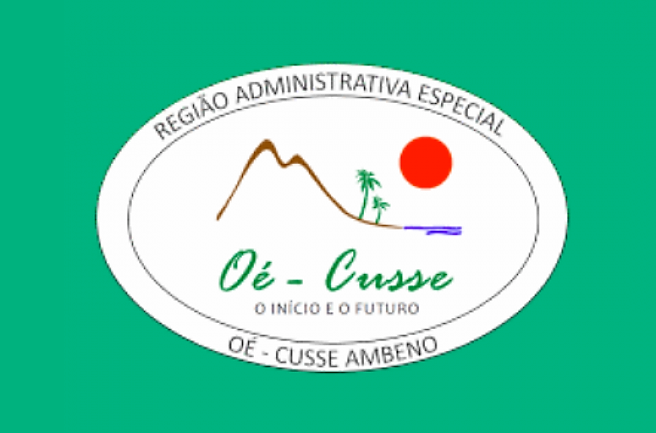
Symbol of Oe-Cusse Ambeno

== See also ==
- List of East Timorese flags
- Coat of arms of Timor-Leste
