= Baguia Fort =

Portuguese-era fort in East Timor

Fort of Baguia
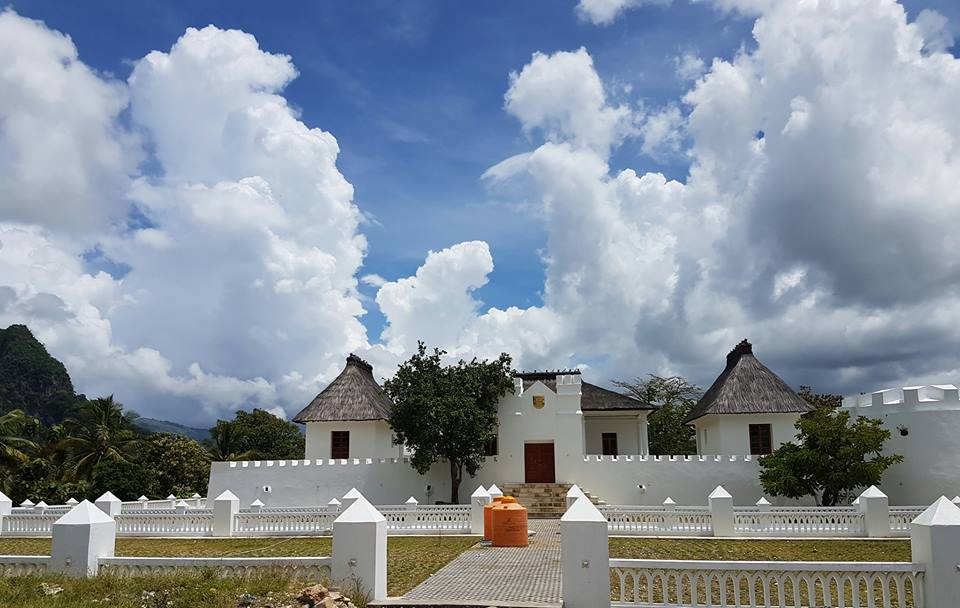
- The restored fort in 2017

- Location within East Timor

General information
- Location: Baguia, East Timor
- Coordinates: 8°37′41″S 126°39′19″E
- Completed: ~1918

A fort was constructed in strategically-located Baguia, East Timor in the early 20th century. The fort was used as an administrative centre, prison, and residence during Portuguese rule. Use of the fort continued under Indonesian rule, although the structure began to decay. The fort was restored following a national government initiative in 2014 and now serves as a tourist accommodation.

== Location and structure ==
The fort lies in the town of Baguia, capital of the administrative post of the same name.

The fort had three buildings: a guardhouse, an administration office, and a house for the administrator. For some time there were orange trees growing near the front of the fort, which were exclusively for the use of the Portuguese.

== History ==
Following the East Timorese rebellion of 1911–1912, the Portuguese built 20 forts between the end of the rebellion and 1918, including the one in Baguia. Baguia was strategically positioned along a route connecting Baucau in the north with Viqueque in the south, and between the mountainous interior and coastal plains. It was considered in need of better law enforcement. The specific location of the fort was on land then owned by the Kekodae'e clan.

Following its construction, the fort served as a site of administration, with its towers being used as prisons. A weekly market took place outside. During the 1959 Viqueque rebellion, a group of less than 100 rebels attempted to move north through Baguia to reach the coast. The fort was manned by professional soldiers, who, with the aid of a machine gun and reinforcements from Baucau, repelled the attack with no casualties on either side. Use as an administrative centre continued during Indonesian rule.

The fort was not maintained during the Indonesian period, and fell into ruin. In 2014, the national government announced plans to develop the fort as a heritage site. It was restored and converted into tourist accommodations, serving as an early example of a national government push to restore old administrative and military buildings to support tourism.

== Gallery ==
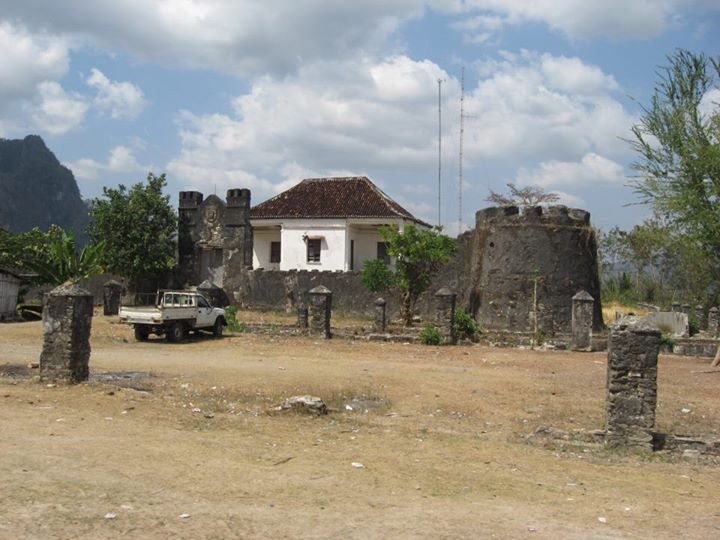
The fort in 2014

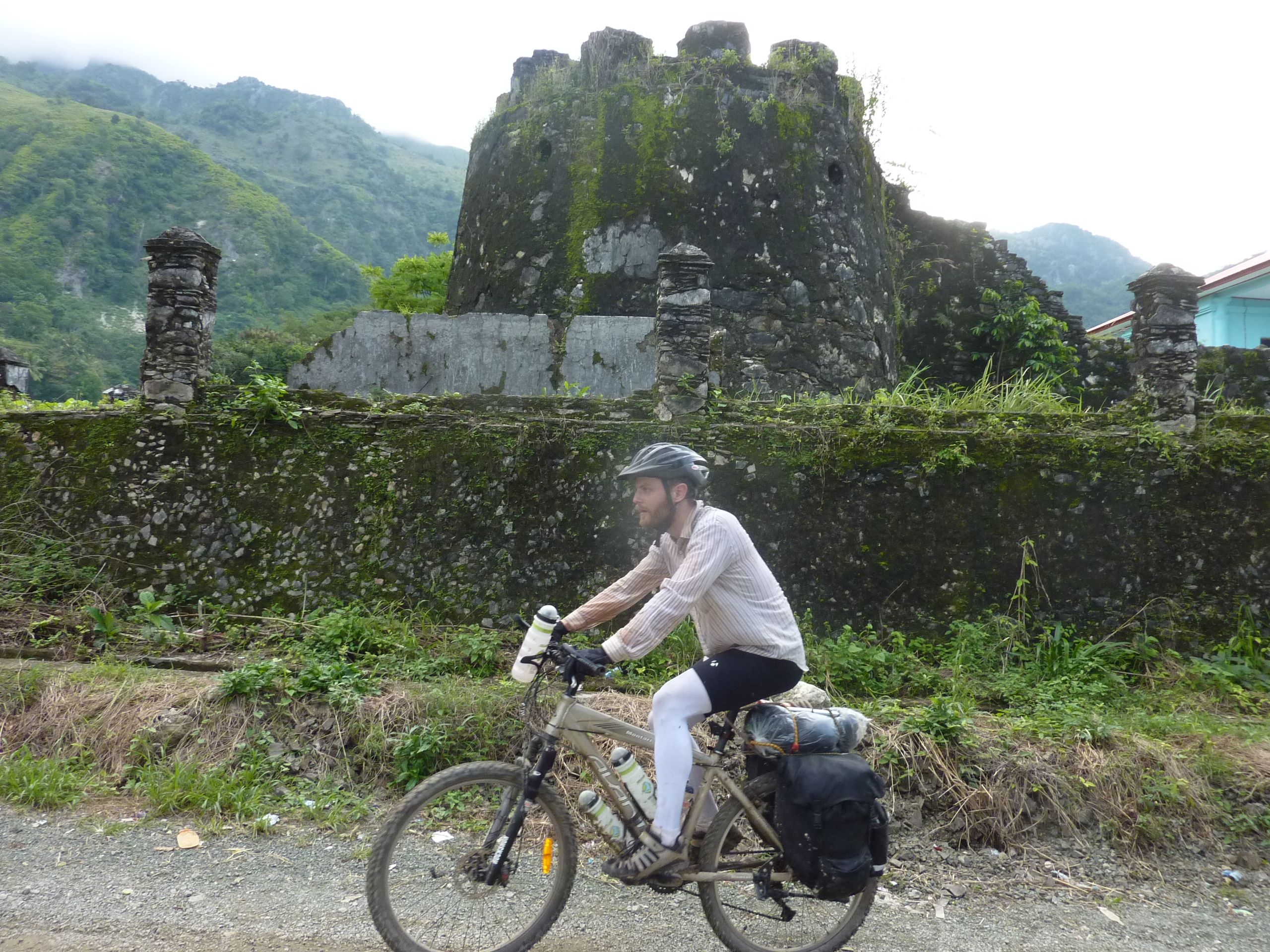
A wall tower in 2014

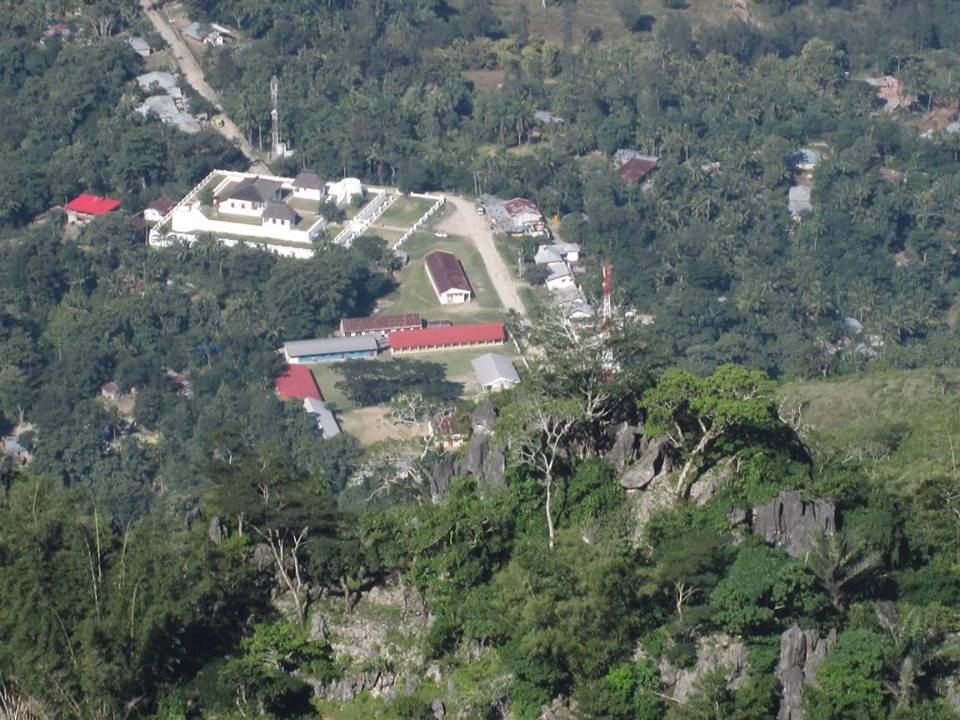
The fort from above
