= Music of Timor-Leste =

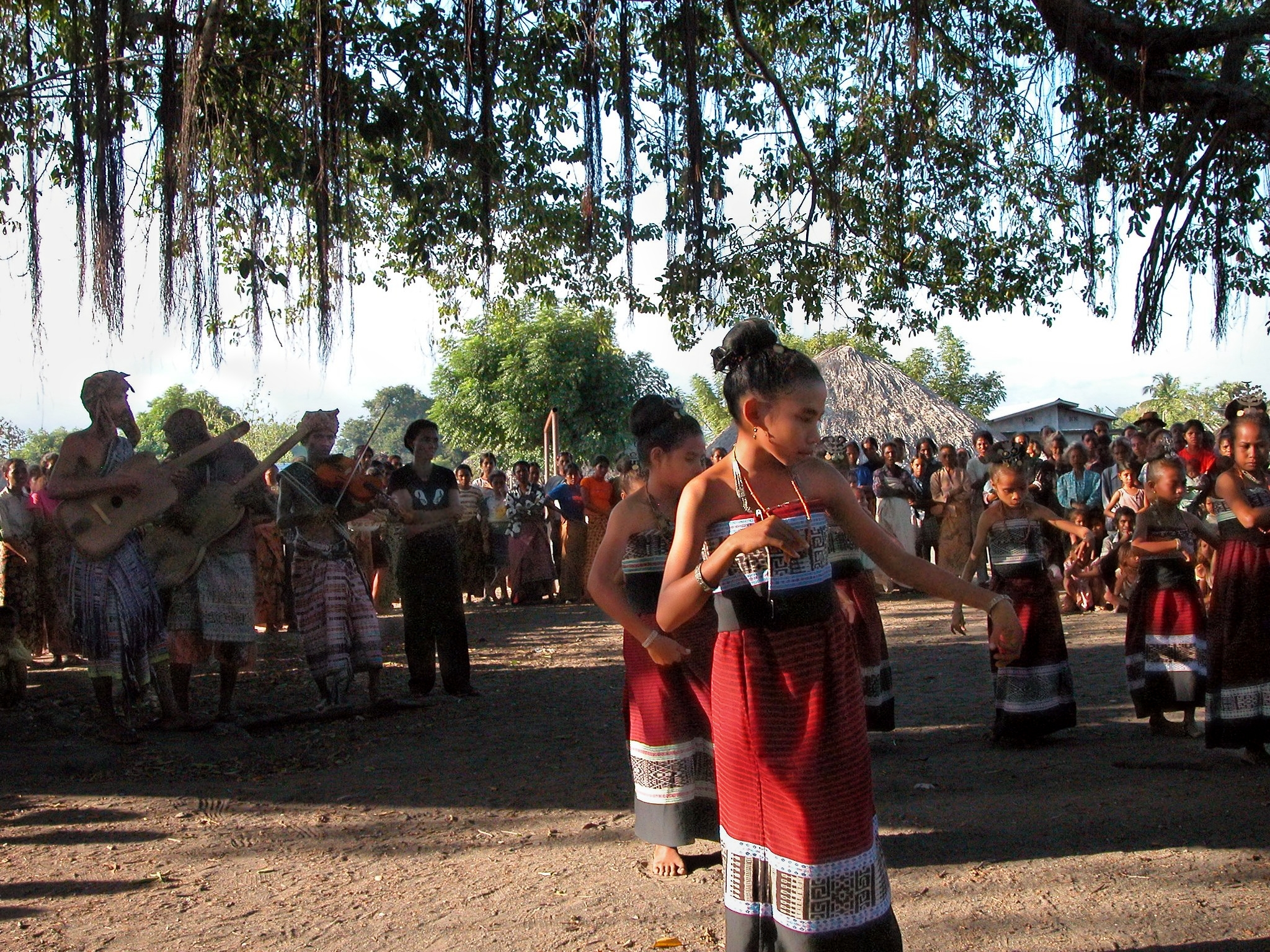
East Timorese musicians and dancers in Suai (2010)

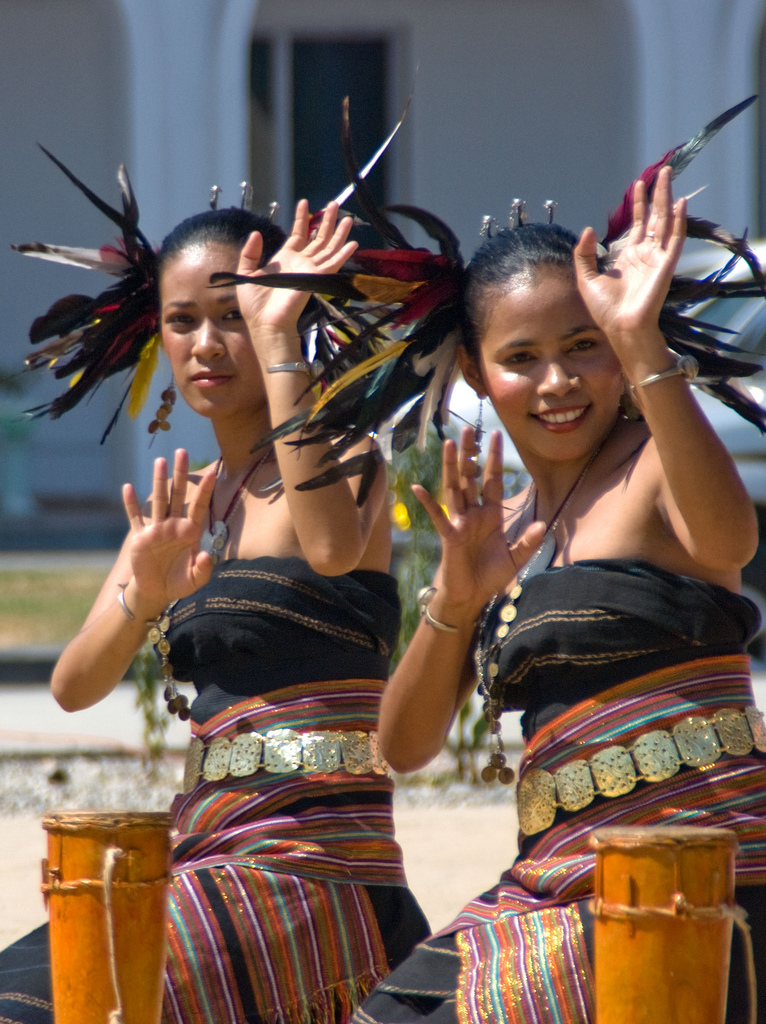
East Timorese dancers

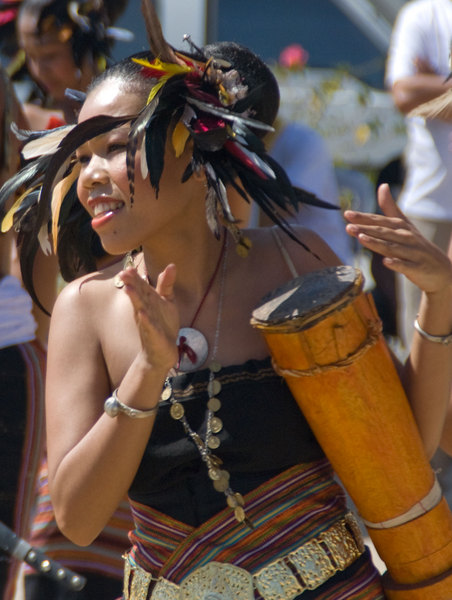
Timorese dancer playing the Babadok.

Timor-Leste's music reflects its history under the control of both Portugal and Indonesia, who have imported music like gamelan and fado. The most widespread form of native folk music was the likurai dance, performed by women to welcome home men after war. They used a small drum and sometimes carried enemy heads in processions through villages; a modern version of the dance is used by women in courtship.

In the modern era, East Timorese music has been closely associated with the independence movement; for example, the band Dili Allstars released a song that became an anthem in the build-up to the referendum on independence in 2000, while the United Nations commissioned a song called "Hakotu Ba" (by Lahane) to encourage people to register to vote in the referendum.

East Timorese popular musicians include Teo Batiste Ximenes, who grew up in Australia and uses folk rhythms from his homeland in his music. With many East Timorese people in emigrant communities in Australia, Portugal and elsewhere, East Timorese folk music has been brought to many places around the world. Refugee camps in Portugal mixed together East Timorese music with styles from other Portuguese colonies like Angola and Mozambique ^{[1]}.

Music and dance are intertwined in the traditional Timorese genres, being fundamental elements of cultural expression. The repertoire played includes four well-defined genres: tebe, tebedai, dansa and cansaun. All are based on oral tradition and have been passed down from generation to generation.

== Instruments ==
Musical instruments, costumes and adornments also play an important role in musical performance. Of the first, babadok and dadir (also dadil, gong or gon) stand out. The babadok is a small tapered wooden drum, about 30 to 50 centimeters long and about 15 centimeters in diameter, generally played by the women that strike it alternately with both hands. The dadir is a metal circle approximately 25 centimeters in diameter, which is struck with a wooden stick, of indefinite height and without the possibility of tuning. Like babadok, it is also an instrument played by women.

The performed musical repertoire also includes violas and soprano flutes, western instruments introduced in the Timorese performance. As far as suits are concerned, they are made up of such mane and fetus, male and female, respectively. Such are multicolored cloths manufactured by hand in Timor-Leste, which men wrap around the waist and which women place around the body, under the armpits. The men put a scarf on their heads over which they apply kaibauk, a metal moon with applications of small tears and ears, the largest and most ornate belonging to the traditional Timorese liurai, chief or king. The surik, a warrior sword, and the belak, a metal disc suspended from the chest, complete the men's attire. Women use kaibauk, in addition to ulum suku, to hold their hair in, and sasuit, a long-toothed comb. They usually wear mortene, a necklace made of different materials, and a white cloth around their waist. Finally, the lokum or kelui, a metal bracelet worn by men on the arm and women on the forearm. All the elements work barefoot and with a salenda, shawl made with the same type of handmade cloth, placed on the shoulders.

The guitar has long been an important part of East Timorese music, though it is an import brought by colonisers; there are, however, native kinds of string instruments similar in some ways to the guitar. Foreign influences also include popular styles of music like rock and roll, hip hop and reggae.

Lyrics of the songs can be sung in Tetum or Portuguese, official languages of Timor-Leste.
