= Luis Roberto da Silva =

East Timorese politician (born 1977)

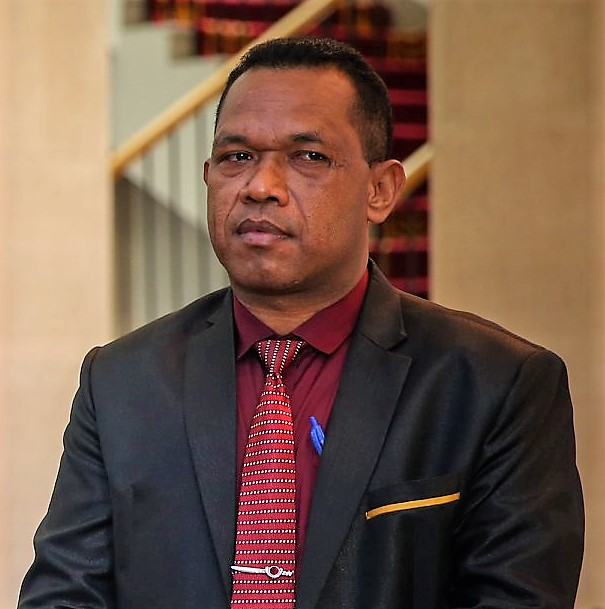

Member of the National Parliament
- Incumbent
- Assumed office 2017

Personal details
- Born: 7 June 1977 (age 49) Uai Oli, Baucau Municipality, East Timor, Indonesia
- Party: KHUNTO

Luis Roberto da Silva (born 7 June 1977) is an East Timorese politician from KHUNTO. He is currently vice-president of the National Parliament.
