= Arte Moris =

Fine arts school in Dili, East Timor

Arte Moris (meaning "Living Art" in Tetun) is the first fine arts school, cultural center and artists’ association in East Timor. It is based in the capital, Dili.

Founded following the violent Indonesian occupation, "Its primary aim was to use art as a building block in the psychological and social reconstruction of a country devastated by violence, with special emphasis on helping its young citizens."

Arte Moris provides art classes to local East Timorese, sponsors advanced students, and manages the sale of artwork, both at their on-site gallery and at two up-scale hotels in Dili. Arte Moris also collaborates with the professional drama troupe Bibi Bulak ("Crazy Goat").

The art center was housed on the former premises of the National Museum in Comoro, near Dili.

The artwork produced at the school is wide-ranging, but is often surrealist in style, and exhibits cultural aspects from the varied regions of the country.

In December 2021, the school was evicted from its building by the government in order to house army veterans.
