= 1959 Viqueque rebellion =

Uprising against Portuguese colonial rule in East Timor

- Part of the Cold War and the decolonization of Asia
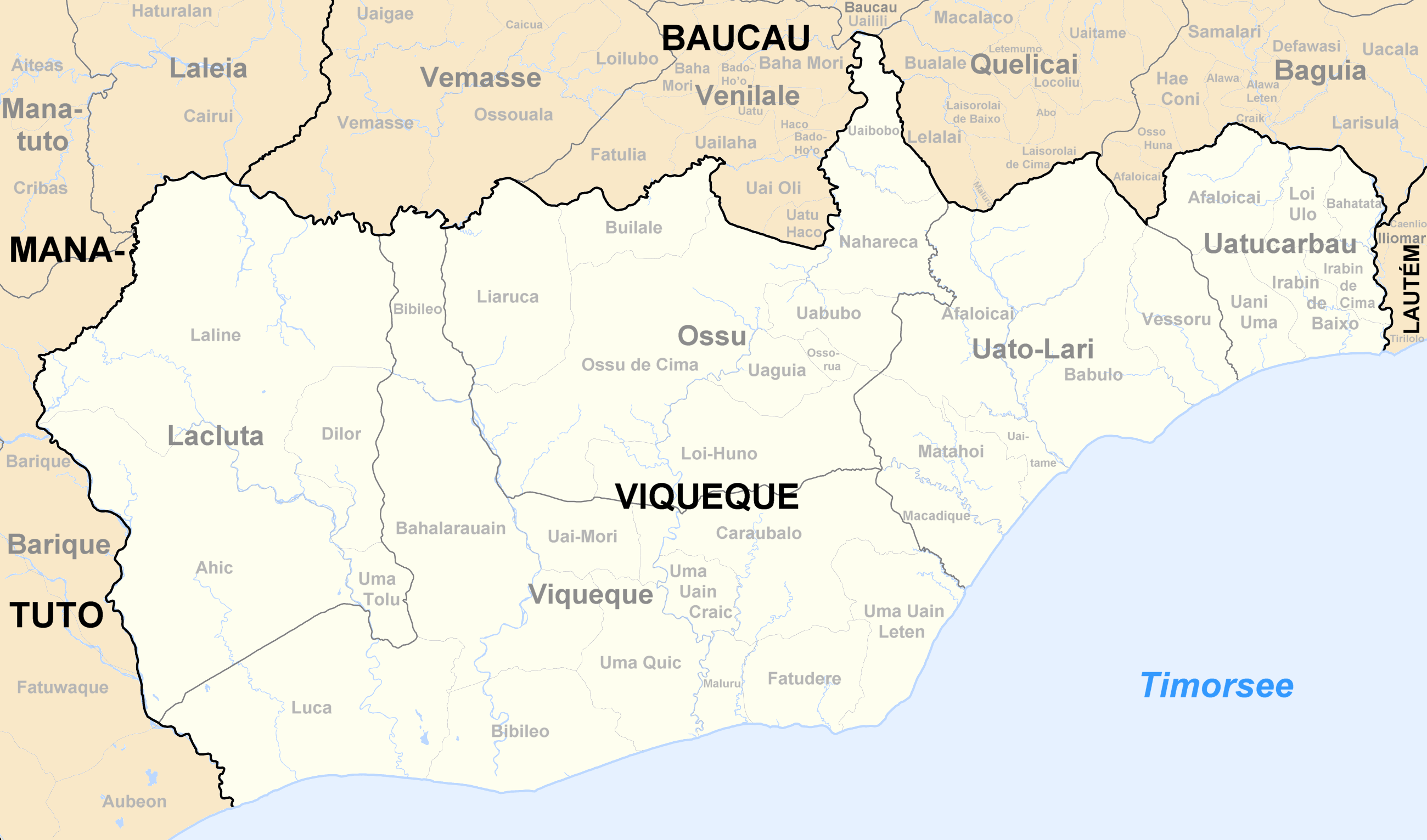
- Map of Viqueque
Date	June 7–14, 1959
Location	Viqueque, Portuguese Timor
Result	Portuguese victory

Belligerents
Portugal	Timorese rebels Permesta rebels

Commanders and leaders
(Portugal) Filipe José Freire Temudo Barata	Antonio Metan; Gerson Pello

The 1959 Viqueque rebellion was an uprising against the Portuguese rule in the southeastern part of East Timor. It was concentrated in the remote regions of Uatolari and Uatocarbau. It was an anti-colonial rebellion against the Portuguese, who had been the colonial masters of East Timor since the sixteenth century. The rebellion is significant in East Timorese history because it was the only rebellion that erupted after World War II. For the longest time, due to lack of information and research, there were speculations and assumptions made about the origins of the rebellion which focus more on external factors, like the role of Indonesia. However, in the last decade, there has been more research done that has helped to illuminate this part of East Timor's history and it has also highlighted the agency of the East Timorese for participating in the rebellion.

== Background ==
During World War II, the Axis powers of Germany and Italy rampaged across Europe but Portugal was spared because it had declared its neutrality. Japan, who was also an Axis Power, was causing anxiety among the Dutch, Portuguese and Australian governments in Asia as they were speedily taking over colonies in parts of Southeast Asia. However, the Portuguese governor wanted East Timor to remain neutral. As a result, 400 Dutch and Australian troops were sent to East Timor in defiance of the Portuguese governor's protests of neutrality. The Australians deployed the troops as they viewed Timor as a buffer and it was imperative that the Japanese do not take over Timor. Soon enough, the Japanese landed in Dili, the capital of East Timor, on 19 February 1942. There was fierce fighting but eventually, the Japanese was able to take over the entire island. In 1945, the war finally came to an end, with the Japanese surrendering and withdrawing from the island. The effects of the war on East Timor were devastating. Dili and other villages were badly damaged due to Allied bombing, and the occupying forces. In terms of human cost, 'Portuguese Timor suffered far worse than any other South-East Asian country occupied by the Japanese.' Over 60,000 Timorese died during the occupation, which was 13 percent of the population at the time. The Japanese imposed forced labour and ruthless appropriation of whole harvests, which led to many Timorese dying of famine and other diseases.

== Political and economic context (1945 – 1959) ==
=== Politics ===
Prior to World War II, the preceding East Timorese rebellion of 1911–1912 had devastated East Timor when the Portuguese colonial administration completed its pacification of the colony, replacing hereditary native liurais (chiefs) with client kings loyal to Lisbon. Nevertheless, the failure of the rebellion was crucial in kickstarting the national awakening of the East Timorese people as distinct from both their Portuguese rulers and the proto-Indonesian Dutch-ruled West Timorese.

Unlike in other parts of Southeast Asia, the Japanese Occupation of East Timor did not spark the start of Timorese nationalism. It also did not result in many Timorese organizing anti-colonial movements or collaborating with the Japanese to achieve independence once the Japanese had triumphed over the Allies. While in other parts of Southeast Asia, the colonizers had to contend with nationalist leaders and groups fighting or negotiating for independence from them as part of this global shift towards decolonization. In East Timor, the Portuguese were doing the opposite, they were re-asserting their authority. Hence, an authoritarian type of government was re-introduced, which mirrored the Portuguese government that had been in power since 1930. In 1950, as part of Portugal's desire to project a different international image, all Portuguese colonies including East Timor were no longer called colonies but 'overseas provinces.' The change in name did not result in a loosening of the repressive regime. As in pre-war days, the Portuguese governor was in charge of Timor but there was also a Timorese system of hierarchy where power was in the hands of the liurai.

=== Economy ===
The war was a catastrophe for the East Timorese economy as infrastructure and plantations were now in ruins. To make matters worse, Portugal was economically weakened by the war in Europe. Moreover, the Marshall Plan, which was an aid programme by the United States of America (USA) to assist European countries to rebuild their economies, was not extended to Portugal. In addition, as Portugal was still a fascist state, the other Western European countries were reluctant to have any dealings with it. Due to the lack of funds from Portugal and the fact that the Timorese were too poor to be taxed, the governor had to rely on forced labour that was arranged by the liurai to rebuild roads, buildings and bridges that had been destroyed. Overall, from 1945 till 1959, the Portuguese spent most of whatever funds they were allocated on rebuilding the capital, and the rest was divided between developing the interior and the agriculture sector. The latter did see improvements that helped to avert a famine. In 1952, funds were also channelled for the first liceu (middle school), which was set up in Dili, and four years later to a vocational school that was started. In short, the Portuguese developed East Timor's economy at a 'snail's pace'.

== Prelude to the rebellion ==
On 27 March 1958, a group of 14 Indonesian men from a rebel movement known as Permesta (Total Struggle) fled from Kupang, West Timor, after being defeated by the Indonesian central government. They landed in the East Timor enclave of Oecussi and asked the Portuguese government for political asylum which was duly granted and they were sent to live in the Baucau area with a daily subsidy. After four months, four of the Indonesians were sent to Viqueque where they made friends with Jose Manuel Duarte, who was a mestizo (mixed blood) Timorese civil servant in the Weather Service. They also made friends with Amaro Loyola Jordao de Araujo, who was a Timorese retired Treasury employee. Concurrently, Luis 'Xina' da Costa Rego, a young Chinese-Timorese driver for the Agriculture Department based in Dili, was spearheading a growing civil servant conspiracy against the Portuguese administration. He managed to convince Antonio da Costa Soares, known as 'Antonio Metan', who was a descendant from the liurai Afaloicai, a kingdom at the foothills of Mount Matebian along the Baucau-Viqueque border. Luis Xina convinced Antonia Metan that there was a colony-wide plot to hold all members of the Portuguese government hostage and demand that Lisbon create a new government. For this plan to succeed, it would require the assistance of everyone in East Timor. The Viqueque plot was championed by Gerson Pello, one of the Indonesian exiles. He promised Luis Xina that there would be Indonesian support for their cause in 'vague and grandiose terms'. This in turn influenced Luis Xina's plan.

However, in late May 1959, the Dili plot was uncovered by the Portuguese who swiftly apprehended the conspirators: Luis Xina, Joao 'Chiquito' Pereira da Silva – a nurse from Manatuto, and Jose 'Zeca' de Sousa Gama of Laga on 1 June 1959 and several family members of Antonio da Costa Soares were arrested and killed by dumping in the Bebui river. They were under arrest because they were suspected of planning a colony-wide rebellion on New Year's Eve. The Portuguese authorities also suspected that the Indonesian Consul, Nazwar Jacub, was in a leadership position in the rebellion. However, they were unable to find any evidence to connect Nazwar to the plot. Most of the evidence that was uncovered was circumstantial, for example, his mail order for a large quantity of photographic equipment, and his friendship with the Indonesian exiles.

Over the next few days, the 'overzealous' Portuguese police commander, Sergeant Manual Da Camara arrested dozens of people. Arrests were made based on little more than the mention of a name during interrogations. Force was used to extract confessions from the accused. The suspects who were arrested came from a wide variety of backgrounds. Some were educated and working in places like the Post and Telegraph, the Indonesian Consul and the bank, and others were illiterate farmers or just unemployed friends of civil servants. The most shocking arrest was Francisco Araujo, who was a distinguished member of the Concelho do Governo (Council of Government).

On the evening of 6 June, the Dili authorities alerted Administrator Artur Ramos in Viqueque to arrest Antonio Metan, as his name was mentioned during the interrogations. Artur Ramos ordered the cipaios (indigenous police) to arrest Antonio Metan. After being captured by the cipaios, Antonio Metan thought of an excuse to buy time and save his life. He told the cipaios that he needed to collect a suit from his friend's house. When they agreed to let Antonio Metan to retrieve his suit, he immediately alerted Gerson Pello and the other conspirators that the plot had been discovered by the Portuguese. At this point, the rebellion began in Viqueque.

== Events of the Rebellion ==
On 7 June, Pello dispatched another Indonesian exile to accompany Antonio Metan back to Uatolari. As a symbolic gesture, Antonio Metan asked the chief cipaio to lower the Portuguese flag and cut the telegraph lines. At Viqueque town, the Indonesian exiles, group of civil servants and coconut plantation workers wanted to raid the district administration building to seize the weapons and use them against the Portuguese authorities. Their second objective was to hold the administrator and his family hostage. They were successful in getting the weapons but the administrator, his family and his assistant were able to escape in a jeep. When the administrator reached Ossu, he telephoned the Portuguese at Baucau and Dili to inform them about the situation at Viqueque.

With the weapons they had seized, their next step was to advance to Uatocarbau to gather more supporters, then to Baguia and finally to Laga on the north coast where the Portuguese suspected they would rendezvous with their Indonesian accomplices. When the rebels reached Baguia, the Portuguese had managed to send reinforcements to Baguia Fort in time. The Portuguese troops and a truck with a machine gun mounted on it were waiting for them. The rebels had to take over a fort but as the weapons and ammunition they had seized from the administrator's building were too antiquated, they were inadequate for the task. The rebels dispersed upon contact with the Portuguese troops by hiding in the jungle or in the mountains. Those who revealed themselves by either surrendering or fighting were killed by the Portuguese.

To clear the area of the rebels, the Portuguese invited troops from the highland Makassae from Ossu and Venilale and Tetun-speakers from Viqueque town to attack Uatolari. The invaders looted everything of value, including rice, livestock and clothes. The administrator of Lautem, also invited people from Baguia, Iliomar and Lospalos to form parties to help put down the rebellion and mete out punishment. The rebellion finally ended on 14 June, estimates of the number of people who died in the rebellion vary between 160 and 1000.

== Aftermath ==
The 58 Timorese rebels who were captured by the Portuguese were exiled from East Timor. On 30 September 1959, a Portuguese-owned passenger ship called the India docked at Dili, picked up the rebels and departed on 6 October 1959. The rebels were exiled to Angola, Mozambique and Portugal.

Nine out of the fourteen Indonesian exiles who were in East Timor during the rebellion were returned to Indonesia in the mid-1960s, one of them was shot dead during the rebellion and the remaining four were deported to Lisbon.

In East Timor, after order had been restored, security was tightened with the Portuguese opening a branch of the Policia Internacional e da Defesa do Estado (PIDE) which was the Portuguese secret police. There were increased military and surveillance activities on Timorese both at home and abroad to ensure that subversive elements did not undermine the regime.

== Debates about the origins ==
The origins of the rebellion have been a hotly debated topic ever since the rebellion occurred. Due to the lack of media coverage of the rebellion and first-hand accounts surrounding the rebellion, there have been speculation and assumptions made about the origins of the rebellion. From the late 1970s to mid 2000s, the debates about the origins of the rebellion were focused on the degree of involvement of Indonesia in fomenting the rebellion. In 1978, one of the first books that were written in the English language about the history of East Timor was published. It was written by Jill Jolliffe and titled East Timor: Nationalism and Colonialism. Jolliffe is unsure about the identity of the fourteen Indonesians but acknowledges that they were the main instigators of the rebellion who "apparently encouraged the Timorese there to attack Portuguese posts at Uatolari and Uato Carabau."

In 1991, John G. Taylor's book Indonesia's Forgotten War: The Hidden History of East Timor was published. Taylor identifies the fourteen Indonesians as originating from southeast Sulawesi and was involved in a regional rebellion against the Indonesian government. They were allowed to settle in East Timor by the Portuguese, thereafter, they allied themselves with local groups who were against Portuguese rule and who wanted unification of Indonesia with East Timor. The fourteen Indonesians tried to mobilize local discontent with the aim of rebuilding their base in East Timor. Furthermore, they were indisputably assisted by the Indonesian Consul in Dili and supporters in Kupang, West Timor, who agreed to supply weapons. Therefore, from Taylor's perspective, this shows that there was some level of support from the Indonesian government for the 'integrationist lobby' in East Timor.

In 1978 there was another book written by Bill Nicol called Timor: The Stillborn Nation' which was republished in 2002 with a different title, Timor: A Nation Reborn. In the 2002 book, Nicol identifies the fourteen Indonesians as part of a movement known as Permesta from Sulawesi who were in Timor to instigate a rebellion to overthrow the Portuguese. They wanted to create an independent East Timor which could function as a base for an independence movement for eastern Indonesia.

In 2006, there was a notable change in focus on what were the origins of the rebellion. That year Geoffrey C. Gunn published a book chapter titled, "Revisiting the Viqueque (East Timor) Rebellion of 1959," also accessible online as an unpublished manuscript. For Gunn, the fourteen Indonesians that took part in the rebellion were part of a secessionist movement but they were not central to the fomenting of rebellion in 1959. Instead, it was the Indonesian Consul in Dili who was the mastermind. However, Gunn does not apportion all the blame on the Indonesian Consul for the rebellion, his work is also an attempt at establishing the motivations of the East Timorese in wanting to participate in the rebellion by analysing their background.

In 2007, Janet Gunter wrote an article Communal Conflict in Viqueque and the 'Charged' History of '59, that sheds light on the role of the East Timorese in the rebellion. Gunter identifies the fourteen Indonesians as just people who were fleeing from Kupang, where the Indonesian authorities were launching a crackdown on a separatist movement. In terms of the role of these fourteen Indonesians, Gunter situates them as one of the groups of active participants; they were not the main instigators. The other groups of active participants in the rebellion were the disgruntled civil servants and minor royalty from the Uatolari and Uatocarbau subdistricts. In Gunter's article, she gives agency to the East Timorese by articulating the reasons for their involvement in the rebellion. For the disgruntled civil servants like Jose Manuel Duarte, they were unhappy that they had no opportunities for advancement in the civil service and that they were treated with disrespect. The minor royalty like Antonio Metan were motivated by perceived corruption in Uatolari. They believed the acting subdistrict head was pocketing a large share of their salaries that were being paid by the Australian firm Timor Oil, which was surveying for oil. Besides these grievances, they were also dissatisfied with issues that were affecting the ordinary Timorese like heavy taxation and a lack of schools.

This shift in the debate about the origins of the rebellion can be attributed to the increasing availability of sources surrounding the rebellion as well as the context in which the writers were writing their works. When Jolliffe published her book in 1978, East Timor had been annexed by Indonesia in 1975 and was under the occupation of the Indonesians. Furthermore, there was a paucity of sources which was due to the lack of attention that the world paid to East Timor in the 1950s which resulted in few international press agencies reporting on the rebellion. Jolliffe's account relied on few sources and she made several assumptions about the role of the fourteen Indonesians without hard evidence. In 1991, when Taylor published his book, East Timor was still under Indonesian rule and it was in 1991 that the Santa Cruz massacre happened – 200 unarmed students were killed by Indonesian forces. Taylor also had the same difficulty with sources. He only relied on two questionable sources – an interview by one of the Timorese rebel leaders and an affidavit that was submitted to the United Nations (UN) Secretary-General by a leader of the pro-Indonesian party who claimed that the 1959 Viqueque rebellion was sponsored by the Indonesian government through bribes given to the Timorese. In addition, Taylor also made assumptions about the Indonesian exiles receiving help from the Indonesian Consul. By the mid-2000s, East Timor had attained independence, after the 1999 UN-sponsored referendum in 1999 allowed the Timorese to decide if they wanted to continue to be part of Indonesia or be independent. 78.5% of Timorese voted for an independent East Timor. With East Timor opening up to the world, there was greater interest in researching about East Timor's history. It was in this context that Gunn and Gunter created their works which used sources that were different from those used by Jolliffe and Taylor. Gunn and Gunter accessed the Portuguese archives and they also used colonial police documents that were compiled by PIDE agents. An important source that both used was the 'memorandum' by Jose Manuel Duarte in 1968 which was essentially a criticism of the entire Portuguese colonial system. Gunter went one step further by interviewing the East Timorese who witnessed the 1959 Viqueque rebellion. Therefore, Gunn and Gunter used the same sources to give a different perspective about the rebellion but both shifted the debate from the role of the Indonesians to the role of the East Timorese.

== Legacy ==
After the rebellion was crushed, it was largely forgotten by the Portuguese authorities and considered a failure and a tragedy. When East Timor was about to become independent due to a peaceful revolution in Portugal that signaled the end of the fascist regime. There was a group of Timorese who had returned from exile that did not believe that East Timor could survive as an independent country and they did not trust the Portuguese as well. Instead they favoured Indonesian intervention in East Timor and they formed a new political party called Associacao Popular Democratica Timorense (APODETI) or Timorese Popular Democratic Association. APODETI party members saw the tremendous change that was happening in East Timor as a chance to elevate their historical importance. They began to tell their version of the 1959 Viqueque rebellion but without the Indonesian exiles and promoted some prominent individuals like Antonio Metan. All this was done to portray themselves to the Timorese that they were the first legitimate Timorese political actors, even before the formation of Frente Revolucionaria de Timor Leste Independence (Fretilin) or Revolutionary Front of Independent East Timor and Uniao Democratica Timorense (UDT) or Timorese Democratic Union.

In 1975, just before the invasion, Fretilin detained some APODETI supporters and after the invasion, Fretilin leaders executed hundreds of detainees, Antonio Metan was one of them. Since then, Antonio Metan's role in the 1959 Viqueque rebellion and his pro-integration stance of 1975 was 'retrospectively associated'. Once Indonesia had taken over East Timor, they began to use the 1959 Viqueque rebellion narrative as proof of an early movement for the integration of East Timor with Indonesia. Indonesia attempted to draw this link when in April 1999, militia leader Eurico Guterres, Antonio Metan's nephew, created the Viqueque militia and they named the group 59/75. By doing so, they concretised the link between the rebellion and the pro-Indonesia side.

However, when East Timor became fully independent in 2002 after an election which was won by Fretilin, they began to emphasize on East Timor's nationalist character and 450-year resistance to colonial rule. Fretilin associated themselves with other rebellions that had happened in East Timor's history, including the 1959 Viqueque rebellion. Hence, by doing so, Fretilin is also linking the 1959 rebellion to them by saying that they are the natural leaders of East Timor's roads towards independence.

The 1959 Viqueque rebellion has been appropriated by both APODETI and Fretilin for political reasons and by doing so they have taken the rebellion out of its context. The rebellion had nothing to do with integrating with Indonesia, nor was the rebellion nationalist in character as claimed by Fretilin. Essentially, the rebellion was the result of apathy and mismanagement by the Portuguese in the post-war era that resulted in a harsh living environment that proved too much for the East Timorese. They were assisted by the fourteen Indonesian exiles that happened to be in East Timor at that time.
