= Buku Mera =

- Village
- Interactive map of Buku Mera
- Coordinates: 8°39′S 125°23′E
- Country: East Timor
- District: Liquiçá

Buku Mera is a village situated midways up a mountain range, in the East Timor Liquiçá District. The village is located to the south east of the Liquiçá township, halfway between Liquiçá and Bazartete. The village featured on the international newsreel in September 1999 due to several cases of rape and murder committed by the rebel group Besi Merah Putih in opposition to Timor-Leste's vote of independence. It has an estimated population of below 50 and an altitude of around 400–200 meters.
