= Bibi Bulak =

East Timorese music and drama troupe

Bibi Bulak (Tetum: Crazy Goat) was a drama and music troupe based in East Timor. They were an outgrowth of the Timorese art school Arte Moris and shared facilities with them in Dili.

Founded in 2000 by US-born activist Yohan York, the group toured East Timor performing original dramas exclusively in the indigenous Tetum language.

Their body of work ultimately included theater, film, radio and television dramas, PSAs, circus, dance, writing, and music, many with social justice themes relevant in East Timor at the time such as reproductive health, HIV prevention, and domestic violence. The troupe also functioned as a school to teach arts to Timorese youth.

As of 2012, the website was no longer functioning.
