= Belak =

Belak is a Slavic surname. Notable people with the surname include:

- Ivan Belák (born 1978), Slovak football midfielder
- Karlo Belak (born 1991), Croatian football player
- Teja Belak (born 1994), Slovenian female artistic gymnast
- Wade Belak (1976–2011), Canadian ice hockey player
