= Timor-Leste Trade Union Confederation =

TLTUC/KSTL
- Timor-Leste Trade Union Confederation
- Timor Lorosae Trade Union Confederation; Konfederasaun Sindicatu Timor Lorosa'e
- Founded: February 2001
- Location: Timor-Leste
- Members: 4700

The Timor-Leste Trade Union Confederation (TLTUC/KSTL) is the main trade union in Timor-Leste. It was formed in 2001 with the support of the ITUC, the ILO, and Australian trade unions.

It continues to draw support from the ILO for its campaigns.
