= União Nacional dos Escuteiros de Timor-Leste =

National Scouting organization of East Timor

- Country: East Timor
- Founded: December 2, 2005
- Affiliation: World Organization of the Scout Movement
- Website www.scout.tl

The União Nacional dos Escuteiros de Timor-Leste (UNE-TL; roughly National Scout Union of East Timor, now The Scout Association of Timor-Leste) is the national Scouting organization of East Timor. It was founded on December 2, 2005 through the merger of the Corpo de Escuteiros Católicos em Timor-Leste (Corps of Catholic Scouts of East Timor) and of Timor-Leste Scouting (East Timor Scouting). The organization is a member of the Comunidade do Escutismo Lusófono (Community of Lusophone Scouting). It became a member of the World Organization of the Scout Movement on 22 June 2017.

Dom Ximenes Belo, former Bishop of Dili and Nobel Peace Prize winner, is a former Scout and active in Scouting.

== History ==
In 1970, missionaries in Portuguese Timor founded an offshoot of the Portuguese Corpo Nacional de Escutas. During the Indonesian occupation (1975-1999), the East Timorese scouts organised themselves in the Corpo dos Escuteiros Catolicos CEC (Body of Catholic Scouts). Among them were, for example, Sérgio Lobo (head of the scouts in Dili from 1978) and Carlos Filipe Ximenes Belo (Bishop of Dili and Nobel Peace Prize laureate). There was also the Indonesian association Gerakan Pramuka Indonesia. Members of the CEC also participated in the resistance struggle against the occupiers.

After the successful independence referendum in East Timor in 1999 and the last Indonesian wave of violence, the re-organisation of the scout movement began in October 1999. The aim was to unite the Catholic Scouts with the Scouts who had previously belonged to the Indonesian Association. At the National Jamboree on 2 December 2005 at Balide Church, UNE-TL was created as a national association. Government Resolution 25/2015 of 29 July 2015 gave state recognition to UNE-TL as the sole national representative of the Scout Movement in East Timor.

== Assembly of the UNE-TL ==
The Assembly is a collection of leaders responsible for the governance of the Union.

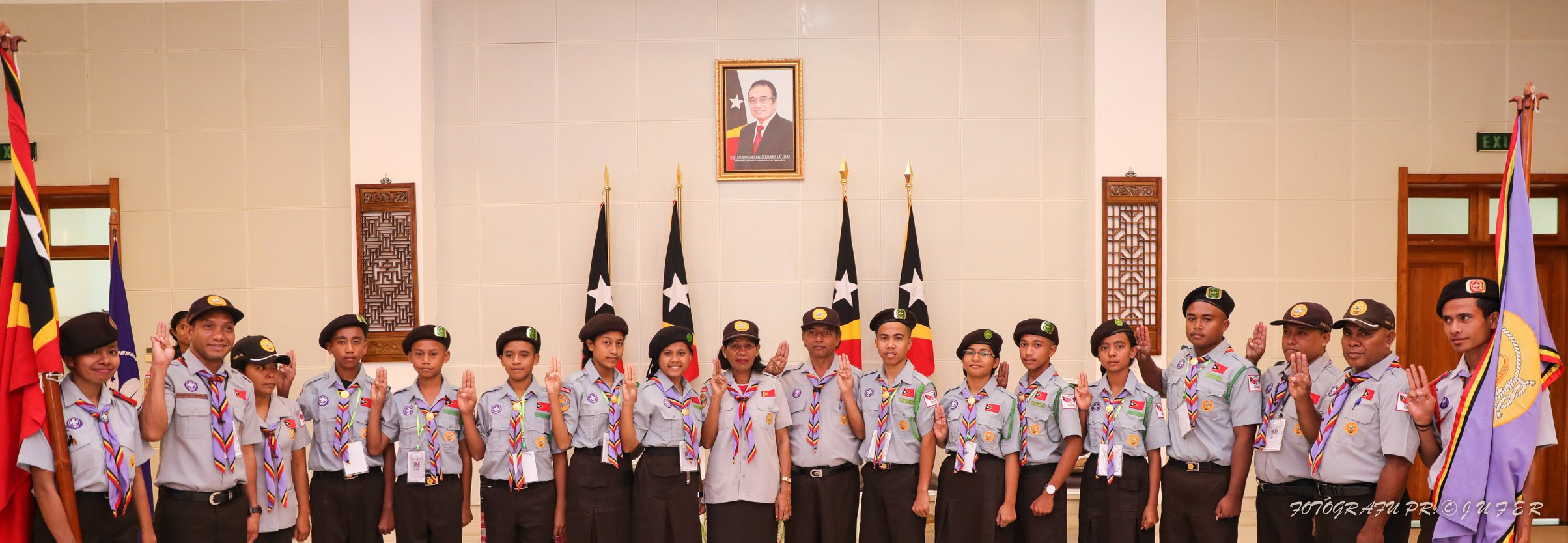
Idelta Maria Rodrigues (centre) with scouts at the Presidential Palace

Membership badge of Associação dos Escuteiros de Timor Lorosae

=== Assembly of 2 December 2005 ===
Election in Balide, Dili;

1. Patron of the UNE-TL: President of East Timor
2. President of the UNE-TL: José Manuel Fernandes
3. First Vice-President: Mario Nunes
4. Second Vice-President: Maria de Fátima da C. Soares
5. Head of Commission: Abel Boavida dos Santos
6. Executive Director: João Carlos Sarmento
7. Commissioner for International Affairs: Filomena Barros dos Reis
8. Treasurer: Hergueluina Alves Fernandes
9. Commissioner for New Launches and Educational Programmes: Isolino Vaz de Alegria
10. Commissioner for the Adult Course Programme: Angelino Melo da Costa

=== Assembly of 23 September 2011 ===
Election in Vila Verde, Dili;

1. Patron of the UNE-TL: President of East Timor
2. President of the UNE-TL: Idelta Maria Rodrigues
3. First Vice-President: João Carlos Sarmento
4. Second Vice-President: Júlio Tomás Pinto
5. Head of Commission: Mateus Maia de Jesus
6. Executive Director: Isolino Vas de Alegria S.G. Amaral
7. Commissioner for International Affairs: Filomena Barros dos Reis
8. Treasurer: António da Luz
9. Commissioner for the Adult Education Programme: Angelino Melo da Costa
10. Commissioner for New Introductions and Educational Programmes: Soekarno Fernandes

=== Assembly as of 30 April 2016 ===
Election in Metinaro, Dili;

1. Patron of the UNE-TL: President of East Timor
2. President of the UNE-TL: Idelta Maria Rodrigues
3. First Vice-President: João Carlos Sarmento
4. Second Vice-President: Maria Olandina Isabel Caeiro Alves
5. Head of the Commission: Mateus Maia de Jesus
6. Commissioner for International Affairs: Filomena Barros dos Reis
7. Treasurer: António da Luz
8. Commissioner for the Adult Education Programme: Angelino Melo da Costa
9. Commissioner for New Introductions and Educational Programmes: Soekarno Fernandes
10. Commissioner for Public Relations: Ulderico Ze Machado
11. Commissioner for the Executive: Recardino C. Fernandes
