= Baguia Administrative Post =

Administrative post in Baucau Municipality, Timor-Leste

Baguia
- Administrative Post
- Posto Administrativo de Baguia (Portuguese); Postu administrativu Bagia (Tetun)
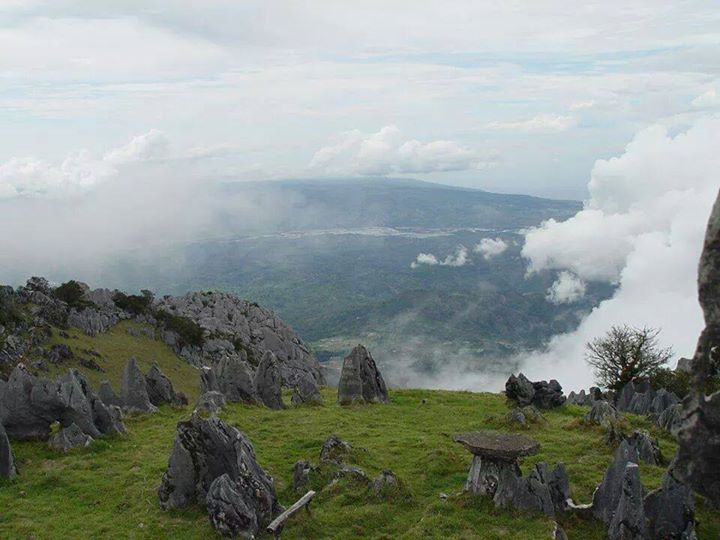
- Landscape in Matebian

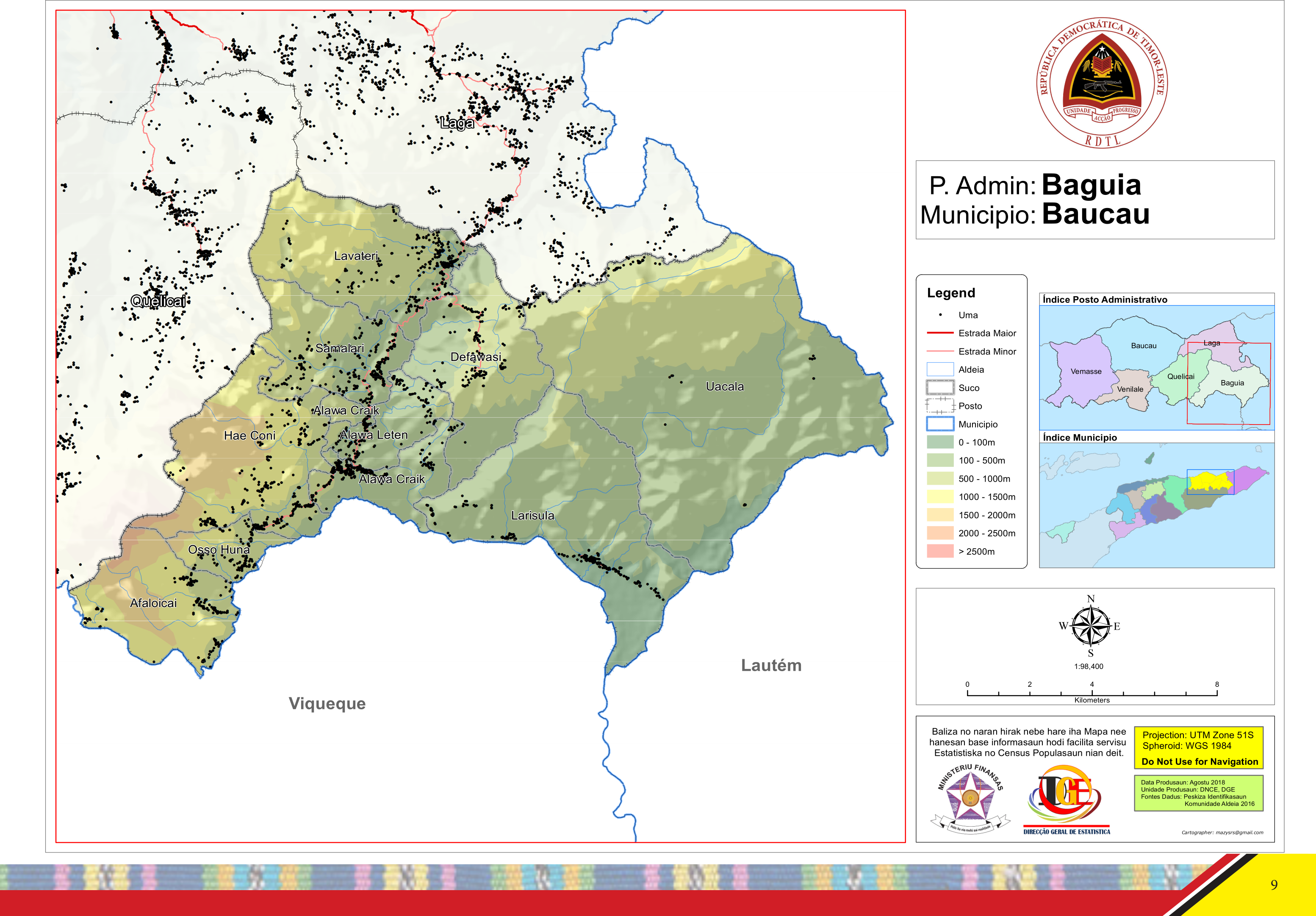
- Official map

- Location in Timor-Leste
- Coordinates: 8°38′S 126°40′E
- Country: Timor-Leste
- Municipality: Baucau
- Seat: Alawa Leten
- Sucos: Afaloicai; Alawa Craik; Alawa Leten; Defawasi; Hae Coni; Larisula; Lavateri; Osso Huna; Samalari; Uacala

Area
  - Total: 212.2 km^{2} (81.9 sq mi)

Population (2015 census)
  - Total: 12,962
  - Density: 61.08/km^{2} (158.2/sq mi)

Households (2015 census)
  - Total: 2,642
- Time zone: UTC+09:00 (TLT)

Baguia, officially Baguia Administrative Post (Portuguese: Posto Administrativo de Baguia, Tetun: Postu administrativu Bagia), is an administrative post (and was formerly a subdistrict) in Baucau municipality, Timor-Leste. Its seat or administrative centre is Alawa Leten, and it has ten sucos.

Taur Matan Ruak, president of Timor-Leste between 2012 and 2017, was born in Suco Osso Huna, Baguia Administrative Post, in 1956.

== Sucos ==
- Afaloicai
- Alawa Craik (Alaua-Craik, Alaua Craic)
- Alawa Leten (Alaua-Leten)
- Defawasi (Defawase, Defa-Uasse)
- Hae Coni (Hae-Coni, Haeconi)
- Larisula (Lari Sula)
- Lavateri
- Osso Huna (Osso-Huna)
- Samalari
- Uacala

== See also ==
- Baguia Fort
