= Aileu Administrative Post =

Administrative post in Aileu Municipality, Timor-Leste

Aileu
- Administrative Post
- Posto Administrativo de Aileu (Portuguese); Postu administrativu Aileu (Tetum)
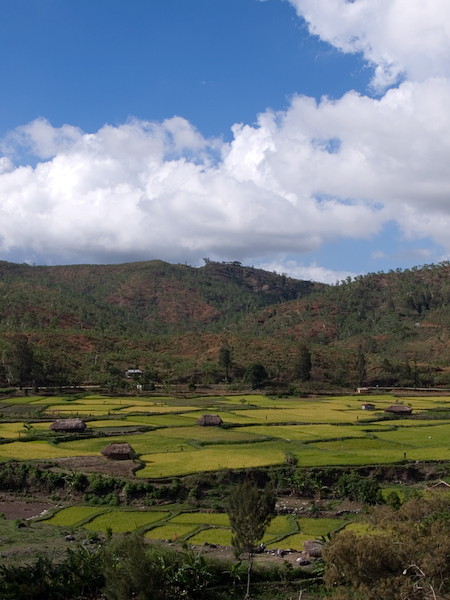
- Aileu Valley

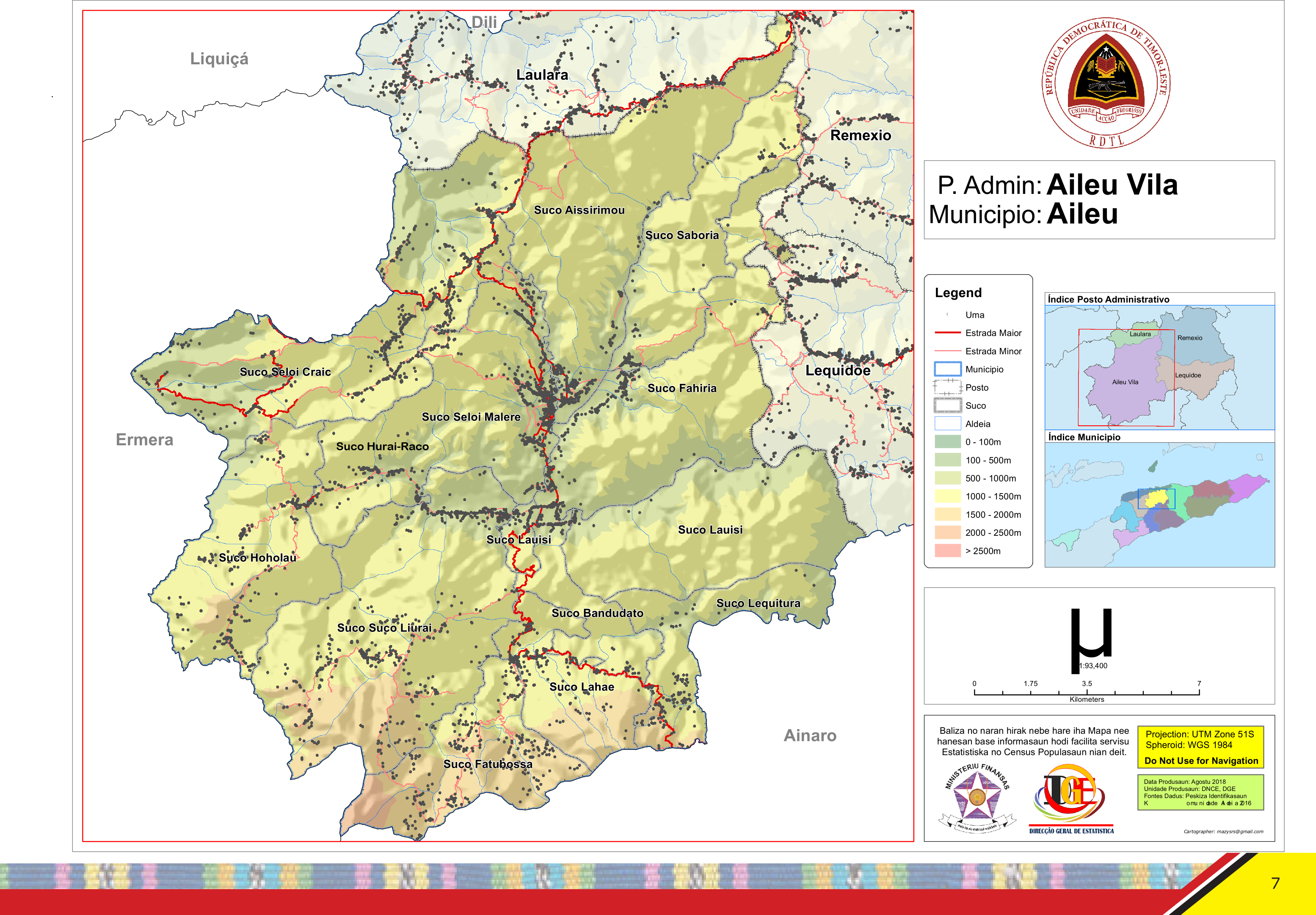
- Official map

- Location within East Timor
- Coordinates: 8°43′41″S 125°34′59″E
- Country: Timor-Leste
- Municipality: Aileu
- Seat: Seloi Malere
- Sucos: Aissirimou; Bandudato; Fahiria; Fatubossa; Hoholau; Lahae; Lausi; Lequitura; Liurai; Saboria; Seloi Craic; Seloi Malere

Area
  - Total: 321.0 km^{2} (123.9 sq mi)

Population (2015 census)
  - Total: 24,049
  - Density: 74.92/km^{2} (194.0/sq mi)

Households (2015 census)
  - Total: 3,846
- Time zone: UTC+09:00 (TLT)

Aileu, officially Aileu Administrative Post (Portuguese: Posto Administrativo de Aileu, Tetum: Postu administrativu Aileu), is an administrative post (and was formerly a subdistrict) in Aileu municipality, Timor-Leste. Its seat or administrative centre is Suco Seloi Malere, in the town of Aileu.
