= Hoholau =

- Suco
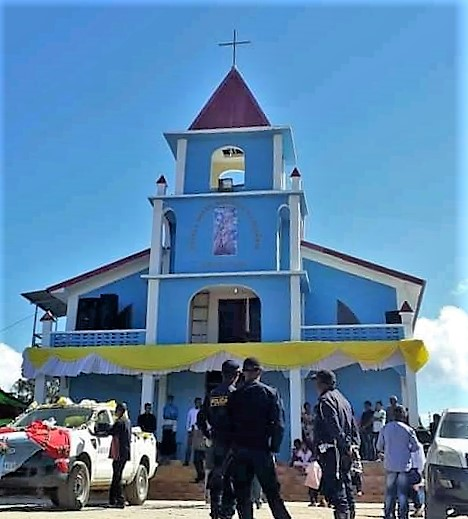

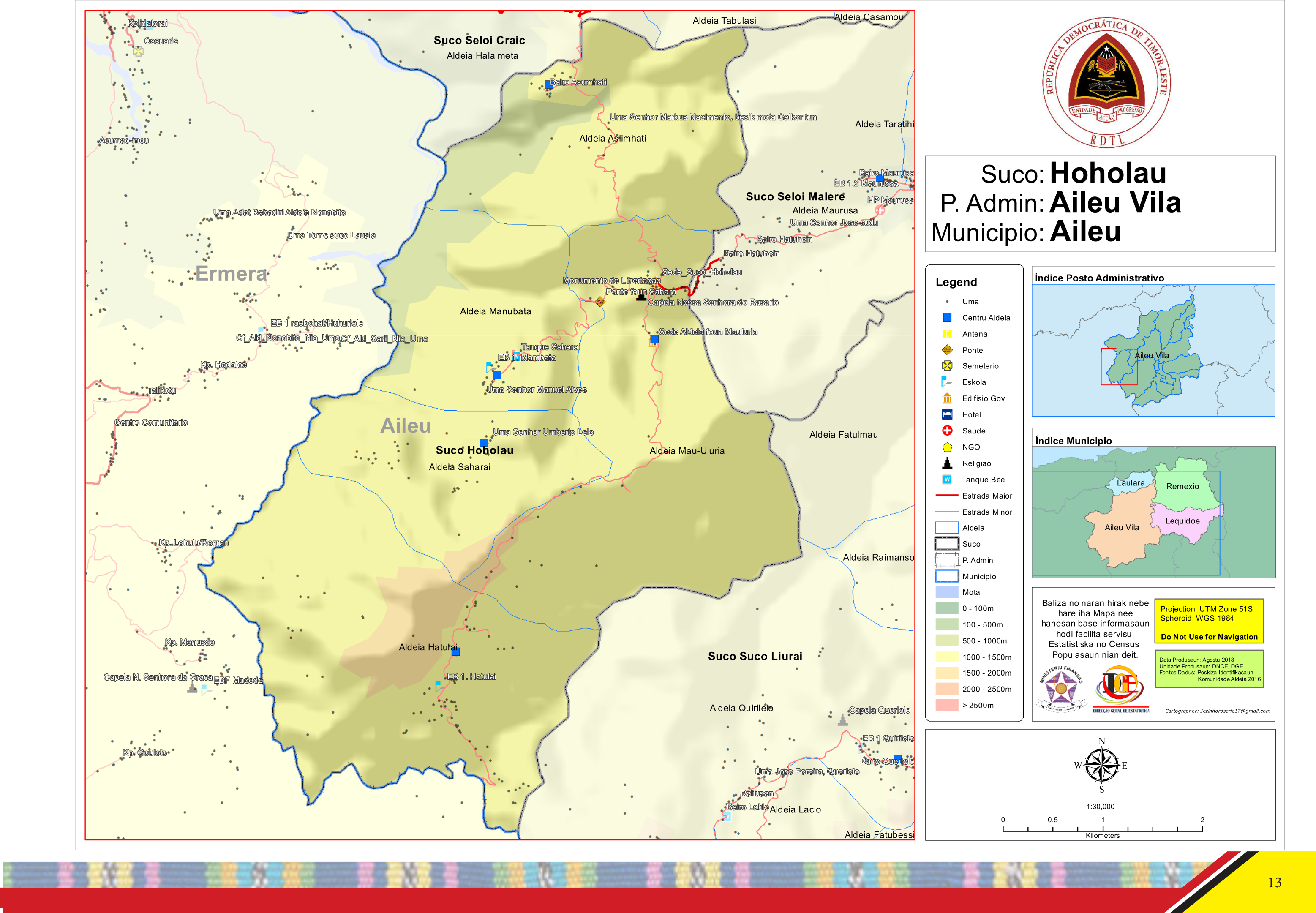
- Hoholau Suco

- Location in Timor-Leste
- Coordinates: 8°45′S 125°30′E
- Country: Timor-Leste
- Municipality: Aileu
- Administrative Post: Aileu

Area
  - Total: 16.72 km^{2} (6.46 sq mi)

Population (2010)
  - Total: 766
- Time zone: UTC +9

Hoholau is a suco in Aileu subdistrict, Aileu District, Timor-Leste. The administrative area covers an area of 16.72 square kilometers (10.38 sq. mi) and, at the time of the 2010 census, it had a population of 766 people

== Geography ==
Hoholau lies to the west of the Aileu Subdistrict and has an area of 16.72 km^{2} (10.38 sq. mi). To the east is the suco Liurai, to the north the suco Seloi Craic. In the west is the Ermera District, with its sub-districts Ermera (Suco Lauala) and Letefoho (Suco Eraulo). The border to Seloi Craic is largely formed by the Olomasi river. In north Hoholau lies the source of the Manomau river. Both rivers are tributaries of the Gleno. The rivers belong to the system of the Loes River.

Only minor roads lead to Hoholau. To the north lie the villages Mau Uluria (Mauloria), Acolimamate and Ouelae, in the center Fisunia, in the south Manama. In Acolimamate there is a makeshift helipad and an elementary school, the Escola Primaria No. 8 Hoholau.

In Suco Hoholau are the five aldeias: Aslimhati, Hatulai, Manubata, Mau and Uluria Saharai.

== History ==
In 1977, during the war against the Indonesian invaders, the Central Committee of the FRETILIN ordered that the population should be relocated from Hoholau to Lequidoe. 500 residents moved, leaving only a small number behind. A FRETILIN member murdered several people who refused to relocate. The suco was attacked by the Indonesian army, and three people died. In Lequidoe, about 300 people were killed.

During the East Timor crisis in September 1999, members of the militia group AHI (Aku Hidup dengan Integrasi) systematically destroyed sucos in Aileu, including Hoholau. Houses were burned down and livestock were killed.

In the elections of 2004/2005, Soares Duarte was elected Chefe de Suco and, in 2009, confirmed in his position.

== Demographics ==
766 residents live in the suco (down from 806 in 2004). About 91% of the population stated Mambai as their native language. About 8% speak Tetum Prasa.
