= North Laclo River =

River in Timor-Leste

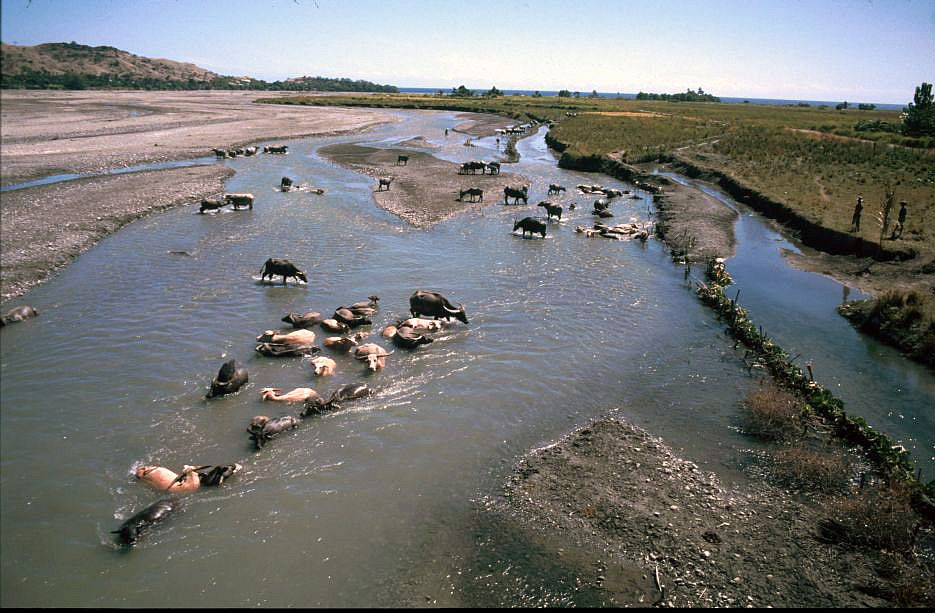
- Water buffalo in the river

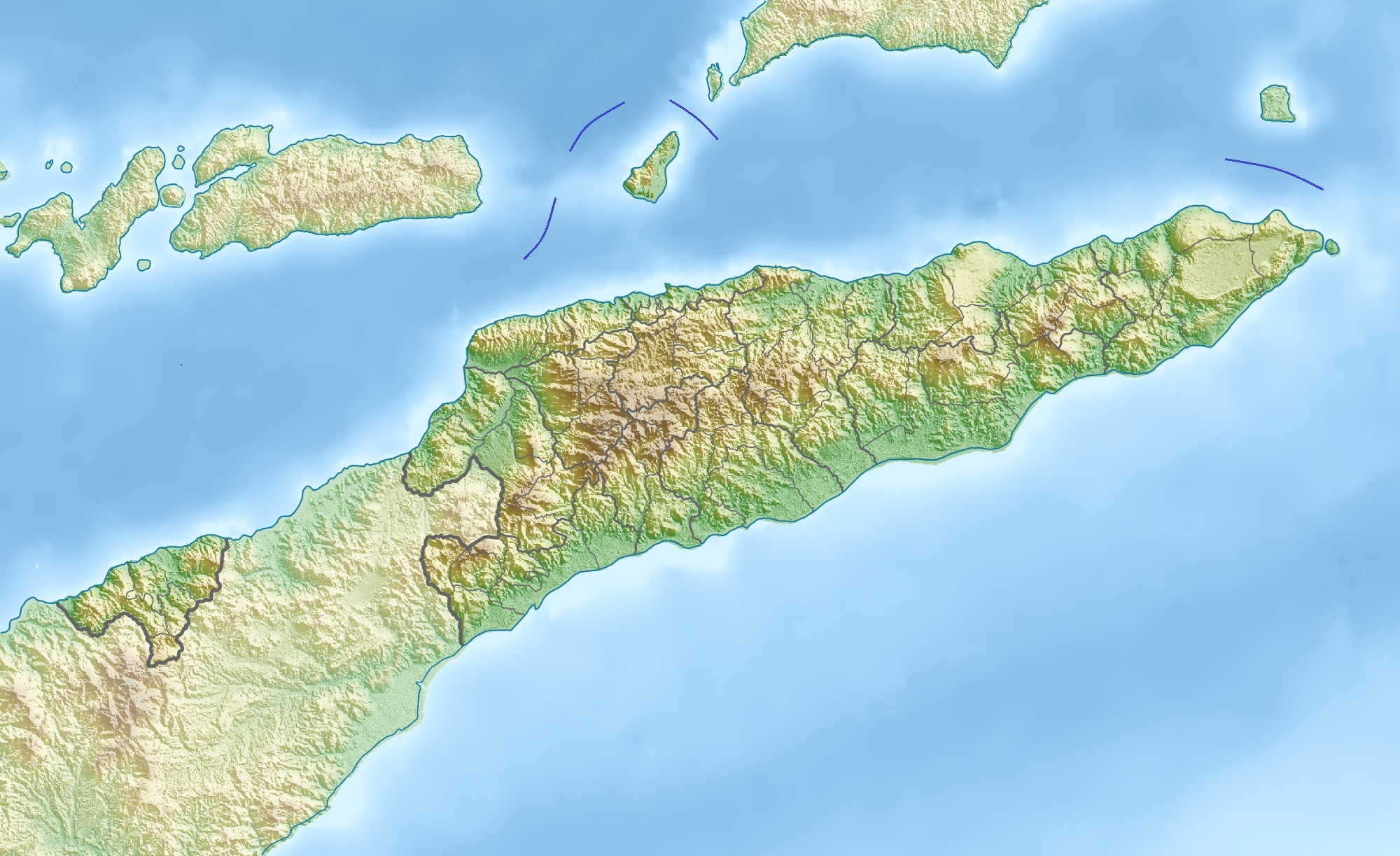
- Location of river mouth
- Native name: Ribeira de Lacló do Norte /; Rio Lacló do Norte (Portuguese); Mota Lakló (Tetum)

Location
- Country: Timor-Leste
- Municipalities: Aileu; Ainaro; Manufahi; Manatuto

Physical characteristics
- Source confluence
  - location: Aileu / Manatuto border
  - coordinates: 8°40′54″S 125°48′49″E
- Mouth: Wetar Strait
  - location: Sau, Manatuto
  - coordinates: 8°29′56″S 126°00′07″E
- Length: 110 km (68 mi)
- Basin size: 1,386 km^{2} (535 sq mi)
- Discharge
  - average: 29.3 m^{3}/s (62,000 cu ft/min)
  - minimum: 8.1 m^{3}/s (17,000 cu ft/min) (September)
  - maximum: 69.8 m^{3}/s (148,000 cu ft/min) (March)

Basin features
- Tributaries
  - left: Noru River; Lohun River; Lihubani River
  - right: Monofunihun / Manotahe / Daisoli / Eralibanaubere / Malikan Rivers; Ue Coi River; Sumasse River
- Bridges: Manatuto Bridge

The North Laclo River (Portuguese: Ribeira de Lacló do Norte or Rio Lacló do Norte, Tetum: Mota Lakló) is the second longest river in Timor-Leste after Loes River, with a total length of 110 km (68 mi). It flows northeast into Wetar Strait, reaching the coast near the city of Manatuto. It has no connection to the South Laclo River, which flows into the Timor Sea.

== Toponymy ==
The river takes its name from the town of Laclo, which is located on its left bank, about 13 km (8.1 mi) from its mouth.

English language sources conventionally refer to the river as the North Laclo River, as there is also another Laclo River, usually referred to in English as the South Laclo River, which discharges into the Timor Sea on the south coast of Timor-Leste.

The two rivers are not connected to each other; both rise in the uplands near Turiscai in Manufahi municipality, where a drainage divide causes them to flow northwards and southwards, respectively, in each case later augmented by several tributaries.

== Course ==
The headwaters of the river are in the portion of Timor-Leste's central mountains ranging from Aileu municipality southwest of Manatuto city to Manatuto municipality to the city's south. From the headwaters, the river and its tributaries flow for the most part in a northeasterly to northern direction through Aileu, Ainaro, Manufahi, and Manatuto municipalities, and eventually into Wetar Strait just to the west of Manatuto, between the Ponta de Subaio and Lanessana Bay.

At around 80 km (50 mi) in length, the river is the longest in Timor-Leste. It is also one of the country's few perennial streams, and one of only three such watercourses in the northern part of the country that can potentially be inhabited by saltwater crocodiles all year round (the others being the Loes and the Seiçal). The river's water level varies between the rainy and dry seasons. Its channel width ranges from about 200 m (660 ft) to over 1,000 m (3,300 ft) in some sections. Near Laclo, the channel was about 50 m (160 ft) wide prior to 1960; it then became around 300 m (980 ft) wide, and difficult to cross during floods. In the second half of the twentieth century, the river's lower reaches widened by about 100 m (330 ft). Its tributary the Sumasse River (see below) similarly became wider.

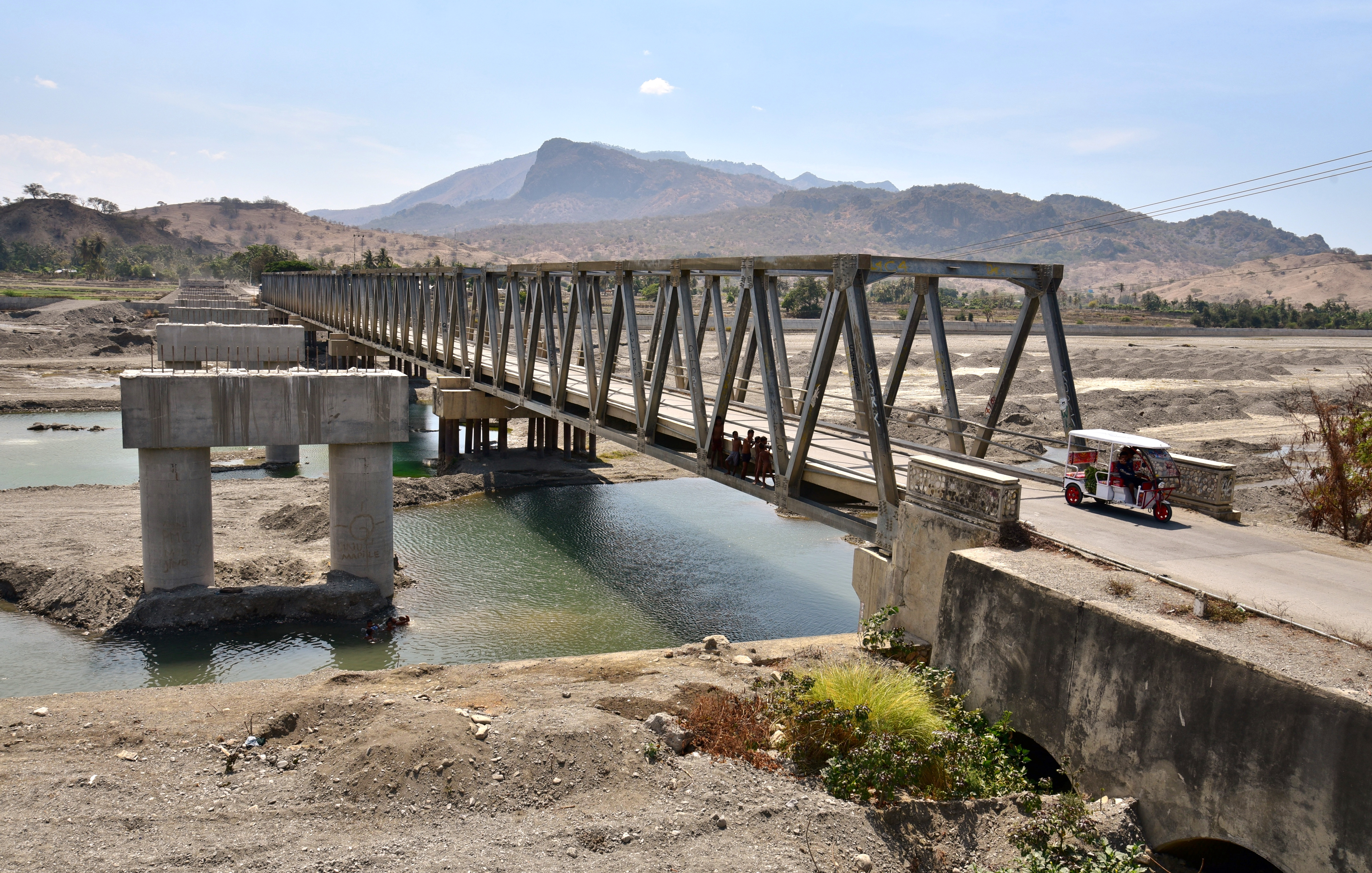
The Manatuto Bridge under construction in 2018, with the 1984 bridge at right

About 2 km (1.2 mi) upstream of the river's mouth is the Manatuto Bridge, a 280 m (920 ft)-long prestressed concrete girder structure that carries the Dili to Baucau highway over the river. The bridge was built in the late 2010s as part of a project to reconstruct the highway. It replaced an earlier bridge that had been funded by the Australian aid program, built by Indonesian public works engineers, and opened in 1984. The first bridge over the river, built in the 1960s, was washed away by floods, and its replacement collapsed a few years later. Between the opening of the 1984 bridge and 2005, the river bed at that location rose by about 1.5–2 m (4 ft 11 in – 6 ft 7 in).

There is no delta at the river's mouth, presumably because the offshore slope is very steep (a near-constant grade over the 10 km (6.2 mi) from the mouth of about 1 in 5 or 20%), with the consequence that sediment has not been deposited sufficiently to break even the nearshore surface. In that respect, the river differs from some of the other rivers on the north coast and most on the south coast (such as the Caraulun River, where the grade over the same distance from the mouth is only about 1 in 20 or 5%, and the river has formed a delta, even though the wave climate is much more energetic).

During the rainy season, the middle and lower reaches of the river have increased sedimentation rates, due to flash flooding, which, typically, causes the otherwise braided channel to become submerged. When flooded, the river carries abundant sediments from parent rock in the upper catchment, and deposits them in the channel and on the floodplain. The river then runs freely through its mouth, and large flows create turbid plumes that head eastwards along Wetar Strait. During the dry season, a bar forms across the mouth, and the baseflow of the river is directed to a fast-flowing channel on the mouth's western side.

The river has eight tributaries, two of which have a major branch. Some of the tributaries are intermittent. In order of entrance, the tributaries are as follows:

- Monofunihun River (or Manufonihun River): rises in central Aileu municipality; flows initially southwest past the town of Aileu, then eastwards to merge with the Daisoli River (see below) at the border between Aileu and Ainaro municipalities north of Turiscai in Manufahi municipality, to form the Eralibanaubere River (see below).
- Manotahe River (major branch of Monofunihun River): rises in western Aileu municipality; divided into the Liurai, Kulalan, and Malubui Rivers; flows approximately 5 km (3.1 mi) eastwards to enter the Monofunihun River south of the town of Aileu, and approximately 20 km (12 mi) upstream of where the latter river merges with the Daisoli River (see below).
- Daisoli River: rises in southwestern Aileu municipality near the 2,512 m (8,241 ft) AMSL peak of the North Laclo catchment; flows approximately 20 km (12 mi) eastwards, mainly along the border between Aileu and Ainaro municipalities, to merge with the Monofunihun River (see above) and form the Eralibanaubere River (see below).
- Eralibanaubere River: flows from the confluence of the Monofunihun and Daisoli Rivers initially southeast, and then northeast to where it merges with the Noru River (see below) to form the North Laclo River; main tributaries are the Malikan, Haru, Aibeli, Karama, Hatoarabau and Orlaquiric Rivers.
- Malikan River (major branch of Eralibanaubere River): rises in Ainaro municipality; flows approximately 10 km (6.2 mi) eastwards, mainly along the border between Ainaro and Manufahi municipalities, to enter the Eralibanaubere River near the tripoint between Aileu, Ainaro and Manufahi municipalities.
- Noru River: rises in central Aileu municipality near the suco of Fahisoi; flows via two branches (Coimai and Hatomero, respectively) approximately 20 km (12 mi) eastwards, mainly along the border between the Remexio and Lequidoe administrative posts, to merge with the Eralibanaubere River (see above) and form the North Laclo River about 30 km (19 mi) upstream of its mouth.
- Lohun River: rises in eastern Aileu municipality near the suco of Faturasa; flows approximately 20 km (12 mi) eastwards, to enter the North Laclo River about 25 km (16 mi) upstream of its mouth.
- Lihubani River: rises in northern Aileu municipality near Remexio; flows approximately 20 km (12 mi) eastwards, to enter the North Laclo River about 15 km (9.3 mi) upstream of its mouth.
- Ue Coi River: rises in central Manatuto municipality a short distance north of Laclubar; flows approximately 20 km (12 mi) northwards, to enter the North Laclo River about 10 km (6.2 mi) upstream of its mouth.
- Sumasse River (or Sumasi River): rises in central Manatuto municipality a short distance northeast of Laclubar; flows approximately 20 km (12 mi) northwards, to enter the North Laclo River in the southwest periphery of Manatuto city, about 5 km (3.1 mi) upstream of the latter river's mouth; in late October 1942, a group of Australian commandos carried out ambushes of Japanese troops at two sites nearby.

== Catchment ==
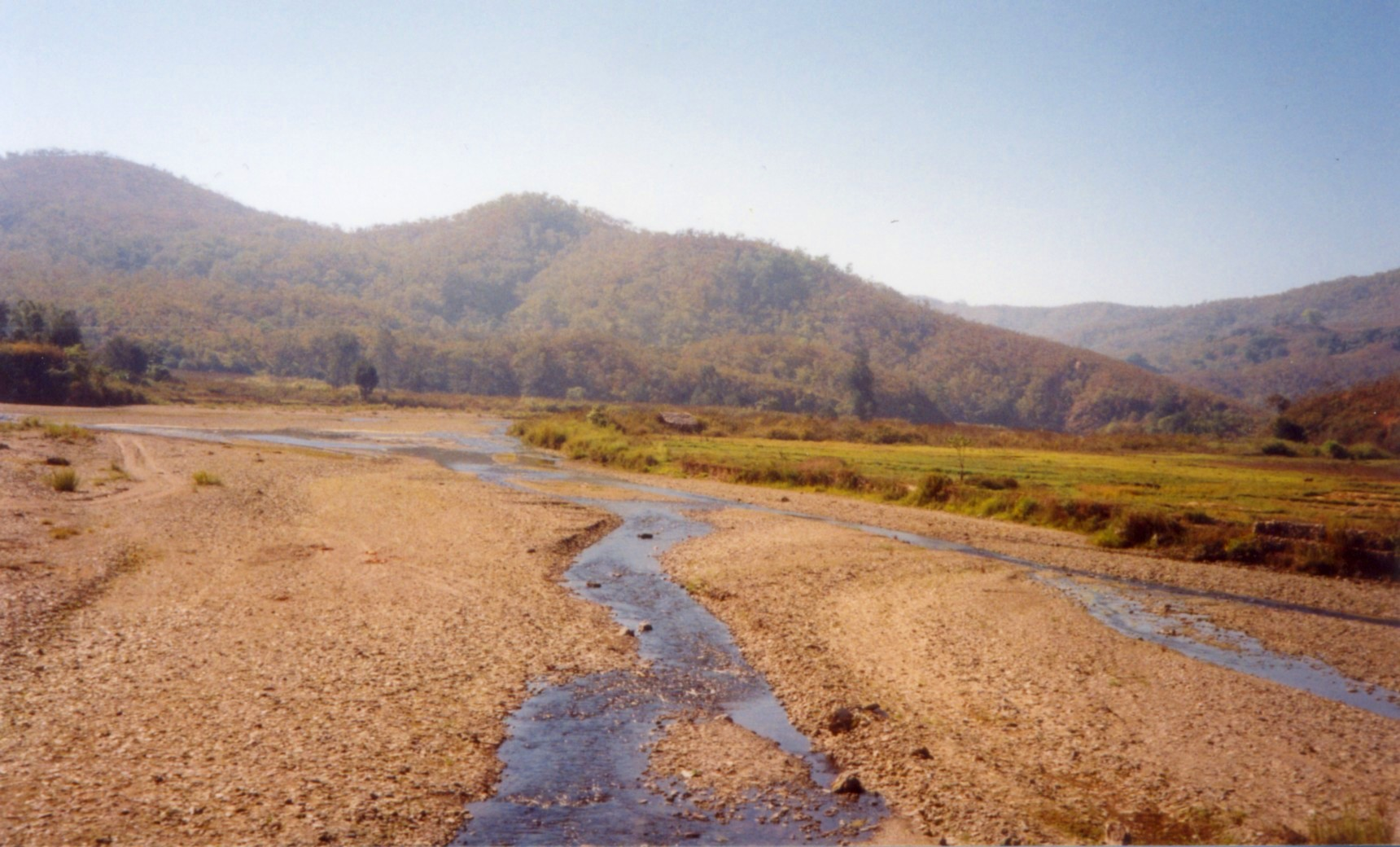
A tributary of the river in Aileu municipality in 2002

The river's catchment or drainage basin is the second largest in Timor-Leste after the Loes River catchment, and also one of the few with a perennial stream. It is about 93 km (58 mi) in length, and extends over four municipalities, namely Aileu, Ainaro, Manufahi, and Manatuto.

Excluding the portion downstream of the Laclo irrigation system's intake, the catchment is around 1,386 km^{2} (535 sq mi) or 138,600 ha (342,000 acres) in area, with the eight tributaries.

Timor-Leste has been broadly divided into twelve 'hydrologic units', groupings of climatologically and physiographically similar and adjacent river catchments. The North Laclo River catchment is one of the two major catchments in the Laclo hydrologic unit, which is about 2,031 km^{2} (784 sq mi) in total area, and covers 13.6% of the country; the other one is the Comoro River catchment.

The major population centres in the Northern Laclo River catchment, from southwest to northeast, are Aileu, Lequidoe, Remexio, Laclo and Manatuto.

The elevation of the catchment ranges from 2,512 m (8,241 ft) AMSL at its southwestern edge to sea level at the river's mouth. Its topography is generally steep. About half the catchment is classified as being lands of between 15% and 40% slopes, and about one quarter has more than 40% slopes. There are small floodplains along the major rivers in the catchment; smaller river channels not flanked by floodplains are, in general, directly abutted by hillslopes.

The catchment has a mixture of dendritic (lit. 'tree-like') and parallel drainage networks. In the upper catchment, drainage is predominantly dendritic; in its middle reaches, some of the drainage is parallel. Almost all of the catchment's rivers have braided gravel beds, the widest of which, reaching a maximum of 1.2 km (0.75 mi) across, are on the North Laclo River.

In April 2005, the Ministry of Agriculture, Fisheries, and Forestry appointed the Japan International Cooperation Agency (JICA) to develop a community-based integrated watershed management plan for the Laclo and Comoro River catchments. JICA provided its report to the Ministry in March 2010.

The catchment's original vegetation was probably moist deciduous forest and semi-evergreen rainforest at high altitude, dry deciduous forest over the lower hills and valley floors, and thorn forest at the coast. However, large numbers of commercially valuable trees were removed during the Portuguese colonial era, and there was significant deforestation during the subsequent Indonesian occupation, when parts of the catchment, especially around military camps, were burned by the military in efforts to curtail and restrict the activities of armed Timorese resistance groups. Deliberate burning by local people also increased.

Over the last few decades of the twentieth century, the already degraded forest in the catchment became increasingly more degraded, due mainly to illegal cutting, firewood collection, wild fires and cattle grazing. The deforestation, in turn, caused tributaries in the upper reaches of the catchment to become intermittent, and is believed by local people to have led to the drying up of springs in those uplands. The catchment was also disturbed by cultivation, shifting agriculture, construction of roads, villages and towns, and Indonesian transmigration and relocation policies.

By contrast, in the early years of the twenty first century there was a reduction in local practices of deliberately burning grassland. In some parts of the catchment, burning was still used to flush out game for hunting, but in other areas, it was banned, in compliance with local Tara Bandu rules.

A 2012 study concluded that erosion (denudation) of the catchment had become up to 20 times higher than over the last few thousand years. According to the report of the study, the most likely reason for the increased erosion was land use. In particular, the removal of vegetation from riverbanks (riparian zones) had caused widespread erosion, and its removal from hill slopes had promoted landslides. By increasing the river's sediment load, the greater catchment erosion had made the river shallower and wider, and thus increased the erosion of its riverbanks. The two forms of erosion, in turn, had combined to increase flooding in the river, and, by making its channels wider and braided, had caused its flows to become more erratic.

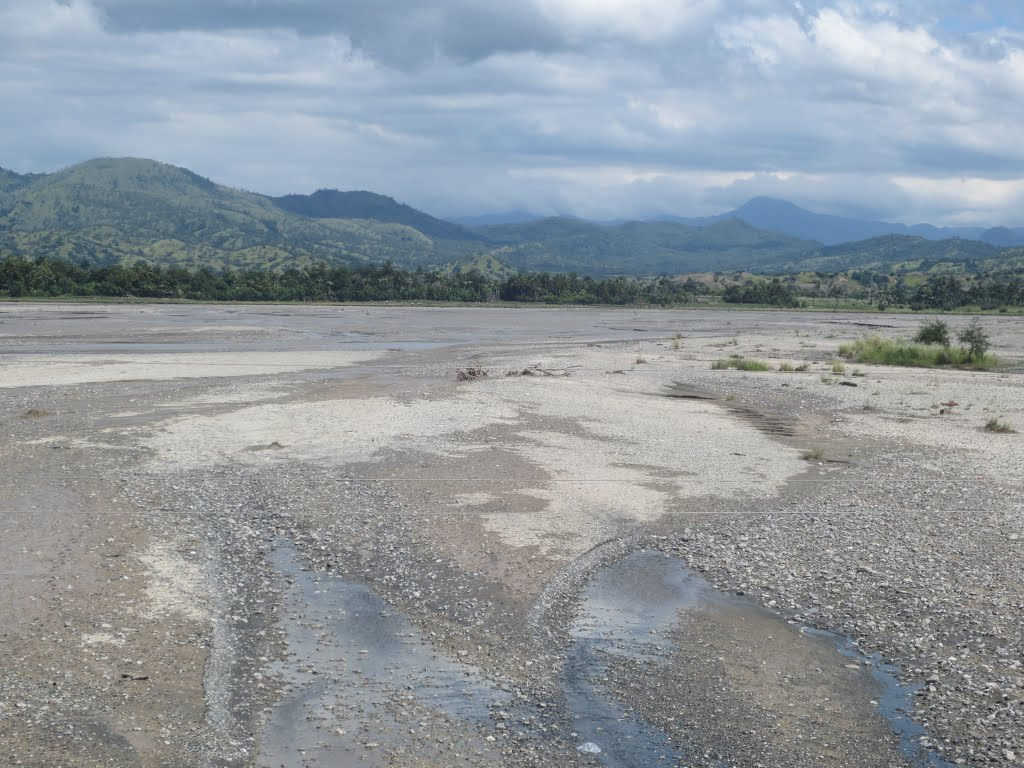
The river near Manatuto city in 2013

Another factor in the erosion of the catchment is that Timor is the deformed northern margin of the Australian continent, where Australia is colliding with the Banda Arc. Due to the collision, much of the catchment is undergoing rapid uplift, at several mm/annum, and as a result, the natural erosion rate of the catchment, involving downcutting by rivers and erosion of steep hillslopes, is very high. In such erosion systems, physical erosion processes (such as landslides, river downcutting, and sheet erosion) normally dominate over releases of fine sediment by erosion of weathered rocks.

Observations of the catchment at the beginning of this century found evidence of widespread sheet erosion, on both grazing land and land used for shifting agriculture. Deep gullies were common, especially in the uplands. There were shallow landslides, and a few deep landslides, but they were not as common as sometimes claimed. Riverbank erosion was also clearly evident. In 2010, landslides/slope failures in the catchment were reported to be concentrated in the upper part of Ue Coi, Sumasse, Eraibanaubere, Malikan and Lohun sub-catchments.

Timor-Leste's catchments are all exposed to a monsoon type climate, with a clear distinction between just two seasons, rainy and dry. The southwestern edges of the upper North Laclo catchment have an annual precipitation of around 2,000–2,500 mm (79–98 in), with a rainy season from October to April; the coastal part has a lower precipitation (500–1,000 mm (20–39 in) annually), and the river mouth has the shortest rainy season (3–5 months, from about November to about March).

Based on records from 1952 to 1974, the average monthly discharge of the river is 29.3 m^{3}/s (62,000 cu ft/min), with the lowest being 8.1 m^{3}/s (17,000 cu ft/min) in September, and the highest being 69.8 m^{3}/s (148,000 cu ft/min) in March.

== Geology ==
The geological complexes and formations straddled by the catchment are the Aileu Complex, Maubisse Formation, Wailuli Formation, Lolotoi Complex, Aitutu Formation, Cribas Formation, and Ainaro Gravel. Within these complexes and formations are shales, phyllites, slate, meta-eruptive rocks, low-grade regional metamorphose sedimentary and eruptive rocks, calcirudites, calcarenites, quartz-arenites, tuffs, marls, silts, arenite, conglomerates, micaceous shales and siltstone, quartzarenite, and calcilutites nodules. The Aileu Complex and Maubisse Formation also contain eruptive rock and metaeruptive rocks.

The catchment's main parent materials are limestone in its southern portion, and phyllite in its upper reaches. Phyllites are located in the catchment between the central mountains at an elevation of about 1,000 m (3,300 ft) AMSL and the river mouth at sea level. They are somewhat geologically fragile, and are easily eroded on being exposed to air after surface soil removal.

In and around Manatuto city near the mouth of the river, the land is underlain by Quaternary River Valley Alluvium (Qa), a shallow formation about 1–10 m (3 ft 3 in – 32 ft 10 in) deep deposited by water from the river. The underlay has a variety of generally unconsolidated textures ranging from poorly sorted silts to cobbles.

== Economy ==
=== Agriculture ===
Most residents of the catchment are members of smallholder farmer households following a mix of extensive swidden agriculture. Upland farming focuses mainly on rainy season production of maize, which, for most rural families, is the food staple. Other cultivated products include pumpkin, sweet potato, cassava, and beans, often produced by shifting cultivation, and limited tree crops of coconuts, papaya, bananas and mangoes. Most of these products are grown on a small scale, and all are mostly for local consumption.

There are also limited areas of irrigated rice cultivation adjacent to the main channels of the river, mostly in its lower reaches between Laclo and Manatuto. The Sumasse River is the main provider of the water supply to the Laclo irrigation system, on the south and northwestern periphery of Manatuto city. The system supports extensive paddy fields, of about 660 ha (1,600 acres) in area.

Established during the Portuguese colonial era in the 1960s, the system was maintained by the Indonesian government during its occupation of Timor-Leste until the end of 1999. However, it was damaged by a serious flood in 1996, and, as of the resumption of East Timorese independence in 2002, was not fully functional. In December 2001, the Government of Japan decided to extend emergency assistance for a UNDP project to rehabilitate the system. The project was completed in 2003. Subsequently, the Japan International Cooperation Agency (JICA) implemented a technical cooperation scheme, the "Irrigation and Rice Cultivation Project in Manatuto", to improve the productivity of rice growing in the area.

According to a 2014 evaluation report of the scheme, frequent flooding during the rainy season had caused damage to the irrigation and related facilities, roads and paddy fields. A follow-up evaluation report, dated December 2019, noted that as of the completion of the scheme in November 2015, rice productivity had exceeded the target value, but that since then productivity had been decreasing, due in part to a problem with sediments in the irrigation facilities.

As the agricultural growing season is short, many farming households pursue a variety of supplementary income producing activities during the dry season. In the uplands, these include limited production of dry season vegetables, and small scale trading activities such as handwoven textiles, livestock trading, manufacture of palm wine (Tetum: tuak) and off-farm labouring. In the lowlands, the activities include fishing and gleaning, along with limited salt production.

Other sources of income and wealth for rural households in the catchment include the raising of livestock. As in the rest of Timor-Leste, there is widespread reliance upon poultry and pigs, and herds of Bali banteng cattle, buffalo, sheep and goats. During the Portuguese colonial era, the catchment was used extensively for cattle grazing. More recently, such grazing has become difficult, because deforestation has promoted the growth of Siam weed (Chromolaena odorata), which is toxic to cattle and also suppresses other ground vegetation. However, even in the 2010s about 18,000 head of cattle and buffalo were being raised in the catchment. Additionally, the catchment's comparatively harsh and dry conditions are particularly suitable for goat husbandry, although goats also have a negative impact on vegetation cover and tend to degrade the land.

=== City water supply ===
Prior to the rehabilitation of Manatuto city's water supply system in the 2010s, the catchment was also the main source of water for that system. The river water intake of the system was located approximately 12 km (7.5 mi) southwest of the city, on a bushy and swampy portion of the right bank of the Sumasse River, about 150 m (490 ft) from its shoreline. Water was conveyed from the intake through a galvanised steel 6 in (150 mm) pipe underneath the North Laclo River to a pumping station, from where it was pumped to the Saututum Reservoir, approximately 12 km (7.5 mi) away.

The river water intake pipe was subject to erosion and damage, because it had been laid in a flood-prone riverbank in an area where sand mining activities took place. As of 2010, more than 300 m (980 ft) of that pipe was eroded, and the city's water supply system was therefore out of operation. Additionally, the transmission pipe from the pumping station to the reservoir passed through paddy fields, where it was at a high risk of being damaged by tractors and other agricultural equipment.

In 2011, the Timor-Leste government and the Asian Development Bank entered into an agreement for the funding of the District Capitals Water Supply Project, to improve the safety and quality of drinking water in Manatuto and Pante Macassar. The Project included the rehabilitation of a groundwater source at Weten Spring, about 15 km (9.3 mi) south of Manatuto city, and the 15.3 km (9.5 mi) transmission pipe from that intake. Other water source upgrade options, including a new river water intake structure, new pumps for the river water pipe, and a bigger transmission pipe between those pumps and the reservoir, had been considered but rejected on the basis of demand and supply and cost-benefit analyses. The Manatuto portion of the Project was completed in 2016.

=== Fishing ===
The sea near the mouth of the river offers good fishing, including for mackerel, Spanish mackerel and two different species of prawns, mostly within 100 m (330 ft) of the shore after the rainy season. The productivity of the fishery appears to have little dependence (if any) upon river-derived materials; and the fishing is small-scale and of the subsistence variety. During the final years of the Portuguese colonial era, the fish that were being caught at that location were larger, and the prawns were more abundant. The local Sau clan now ritually manages the prawn fishery, according to its Tara Bandu rules.

In the twentieth century, fish and prawns could also be caught in the upper reaches of the catchment.

The long-term decline of the fisheries in the river and near its mouth is possibly due to habitat change by sedimentation, a reduction in the nutrients being released from sandier sediment deposited offshore, and the pressure of fishing in those two locations.

=== Hydroelectricity ===
The catchment has been assessed as having potential for the construction of a large scale multi-purpose dam to harvest raw water and generate hydroelectricity by hydropower.

=== Mining ===
In November 2022, the Timor-Leste government, through its Council of Ministers, approved the opening of concession areas in three rivers, including the North Laclo River, for the mining of industrial minerals to be used in the production of construction materials.

Also approved in November 2022 were tender terms for the award of mining rights in the concession areas.

Each of the three rivers has abundant sediments transported from upstream in its catchment, or created by erosion of its banks. The sediments are deposited as either gravel or sand on the river's braided flood plains. After being deposited, the gravel and sand can be extracted and used primarily in the construction of small- to medium scale projects.

The North Laclo River concession has a total estimated surface area of 114 ha (280 acres). It is made up of two zones, one 500 m (1,600 ft) upstream of the Manatuto Bridge, and the other 500 m downstream of the bridge and 500 m away from the Wetar Strait shoreline.

== See also ==
- List of rivers of Timor-Leste
