= Lahae =

Coordinates: 8.7903°S 125.5600°E

- Suco
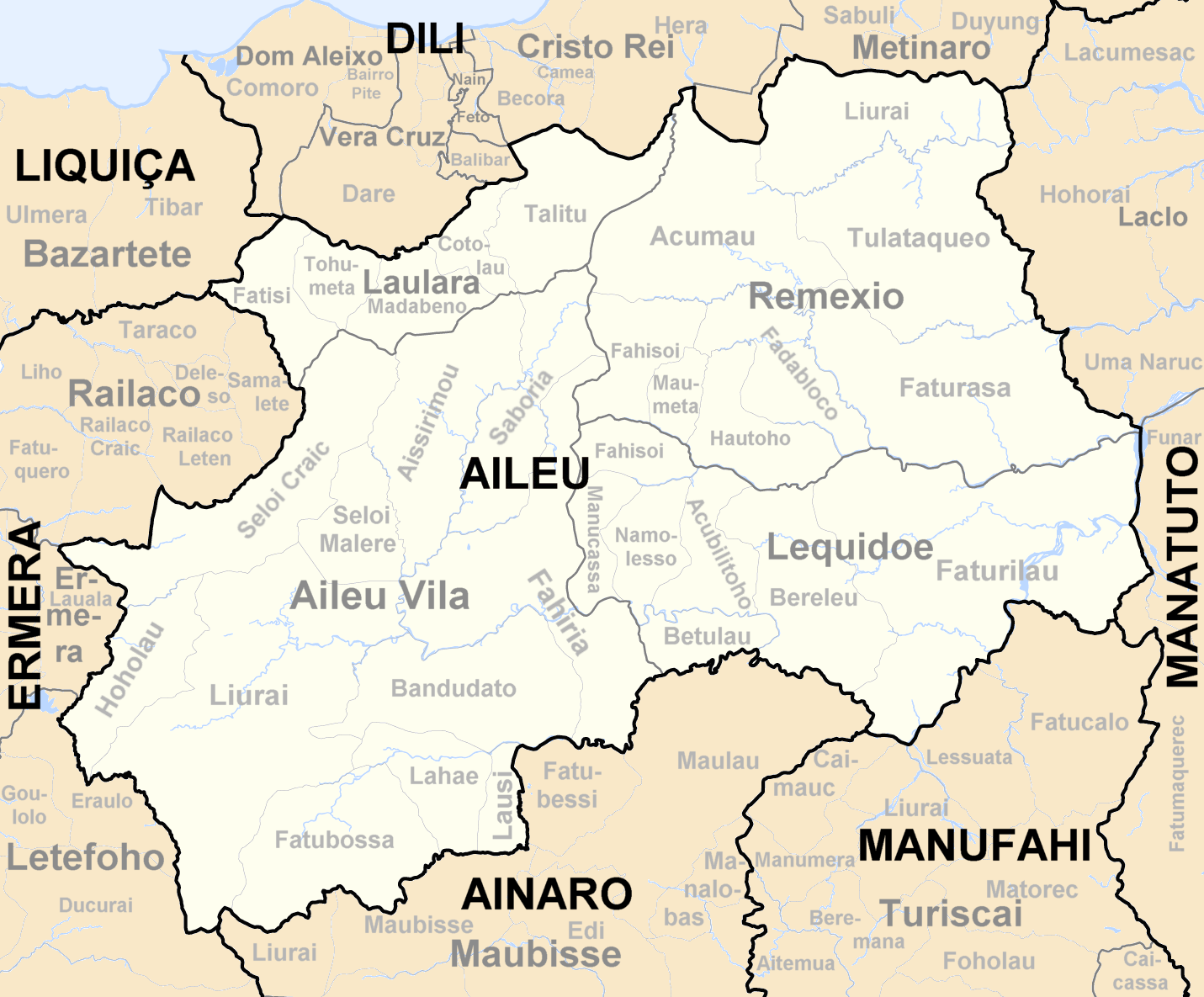
- Sucos of Aileu District
- Country: Timor-Leste
- District: Aileu
- Subdistrict: Aileu

Area
  - Total: 13.64 km^{2} (5.27 sq mi)

Population (2010)
  - Total: 1,061
- Time zone: UTC +9

Lahae is a suco in Aileu subdistrict, Aileu District, Timor-Leste. The administrative area covers an area of 13.64 square kilometres and at the time of the 2010 census it had a population of 1061 people.
