= Fahiria =

Coordinates: 8.7211°S 125.5864°E

- Suco
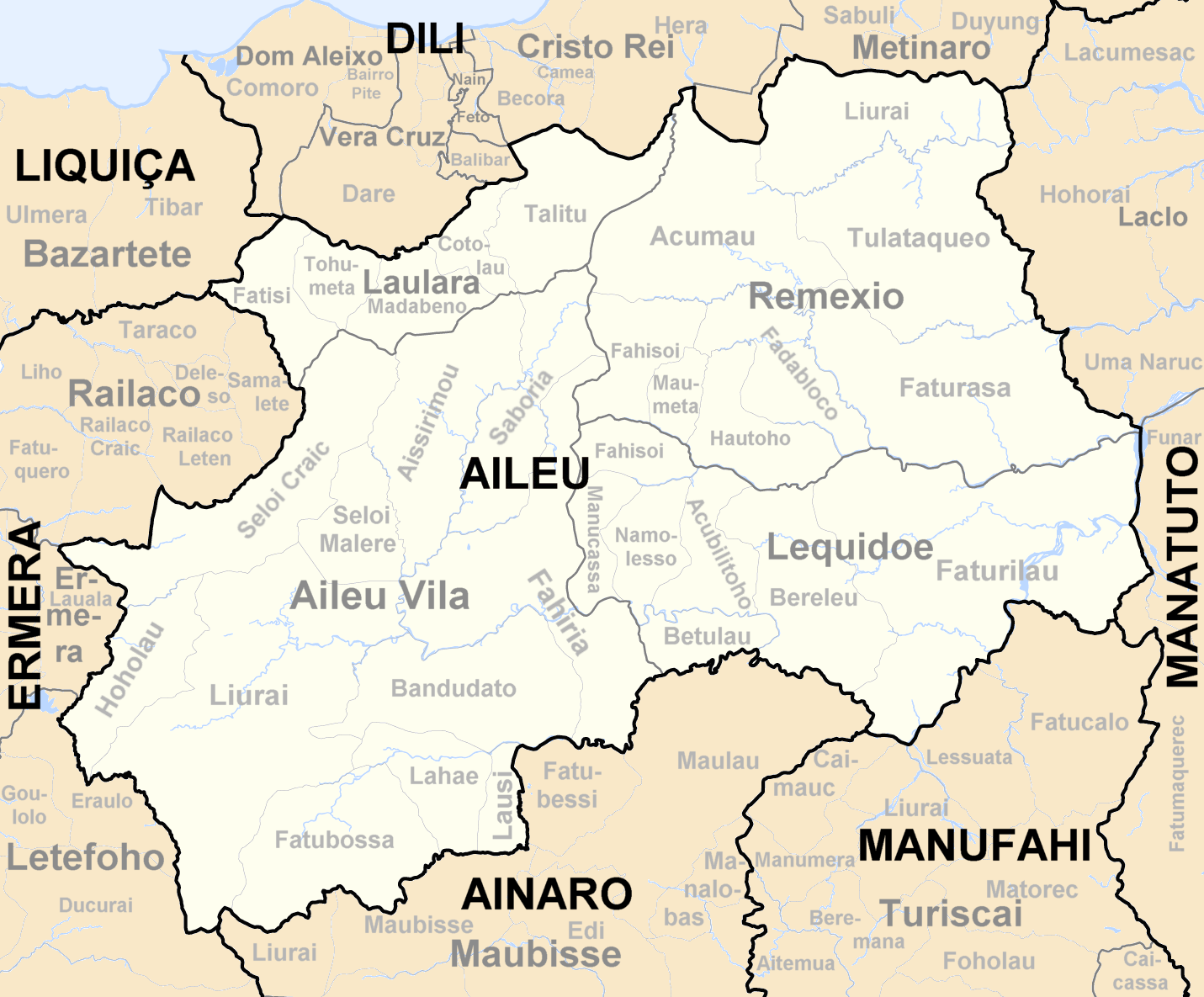
- Sucos of Aileu District
- Country: Timor-Leste
- District: Aileu
- Subdistrict: Aileu

Area
  - Total: 43.77 km^{2} (16.90 sq mi)

Population (2010)
  - Total: 854
- Time zone: UTC +9

Fahiria is a suco in Aileu subdistrict, Aileu District, Timor-Leste. The administrative area covers an area of 43.77 square kilometres and at the time of the 2010 census it had a population of 854 people.
