= Saboria =

Coordinates: 8°43′S 125°35′E

- Suco
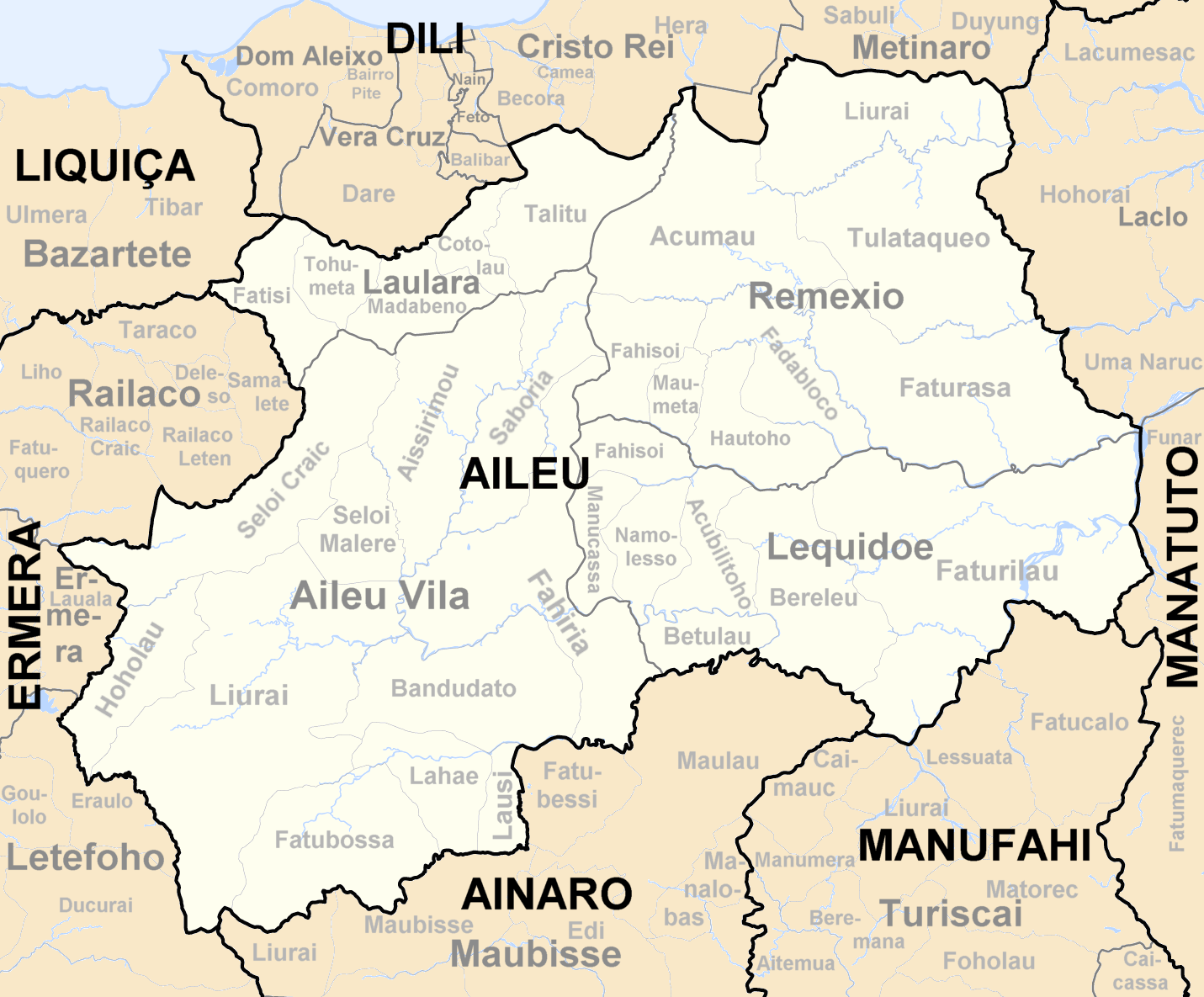
- Sucos of Aileu District
- Country: Timor-Leste
- District: Aileu
- Subdistrict: Aileu

Area
  - Total: 22.14 km^{2} (8.55 sq mi)

Population (2010)
  - Total: 713
- Time zone: UTC +9

Saboria is a suco in Aileu subdistrict, Aileu District, Timor-Leste. The administrative area covers an area of 22.14 square kilometres and at the time of the 2010 census it had a population of 713 people.
