= Fatubossa =

Coordinates: 8°48′S 125°33′E

- Suco
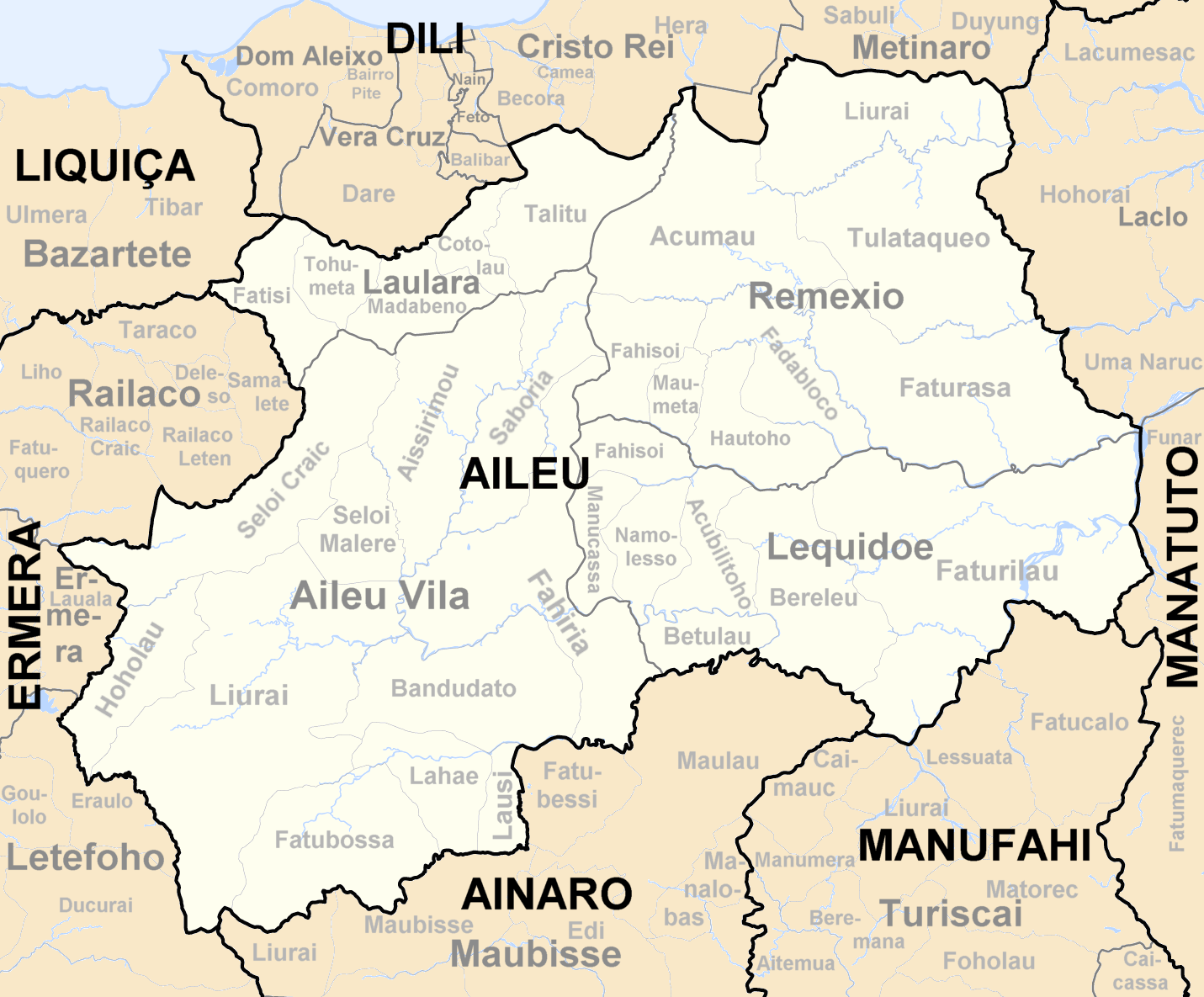
- Sucos of Aileu District
- Country: Timor-Leste
- District: Aileu
- Subdistrict: Aileu

Area
  - Total: 29.31 km^{2} (11.32 sq mi)

Population (2010)
  - Total: 1,750
- Time zone: UTC +9

Fatubossa is a suco in Aileu subdistrict, Aileu District, Timor-Leste. The administrative area covers an area of 29.31 square kilometres and at the time of the 2010 census it had a population of 1750 people.
