= Bandudato =

Coordinates: 8.7633°S 125.5692°E

- Suco
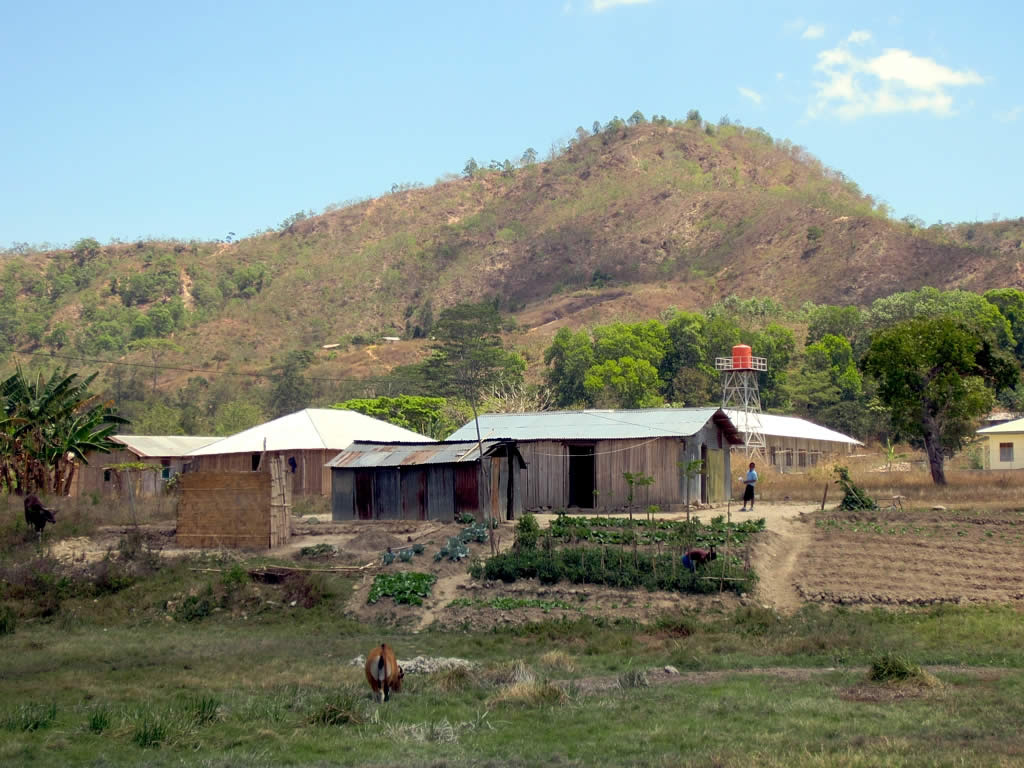
- Raelete, Bandudato

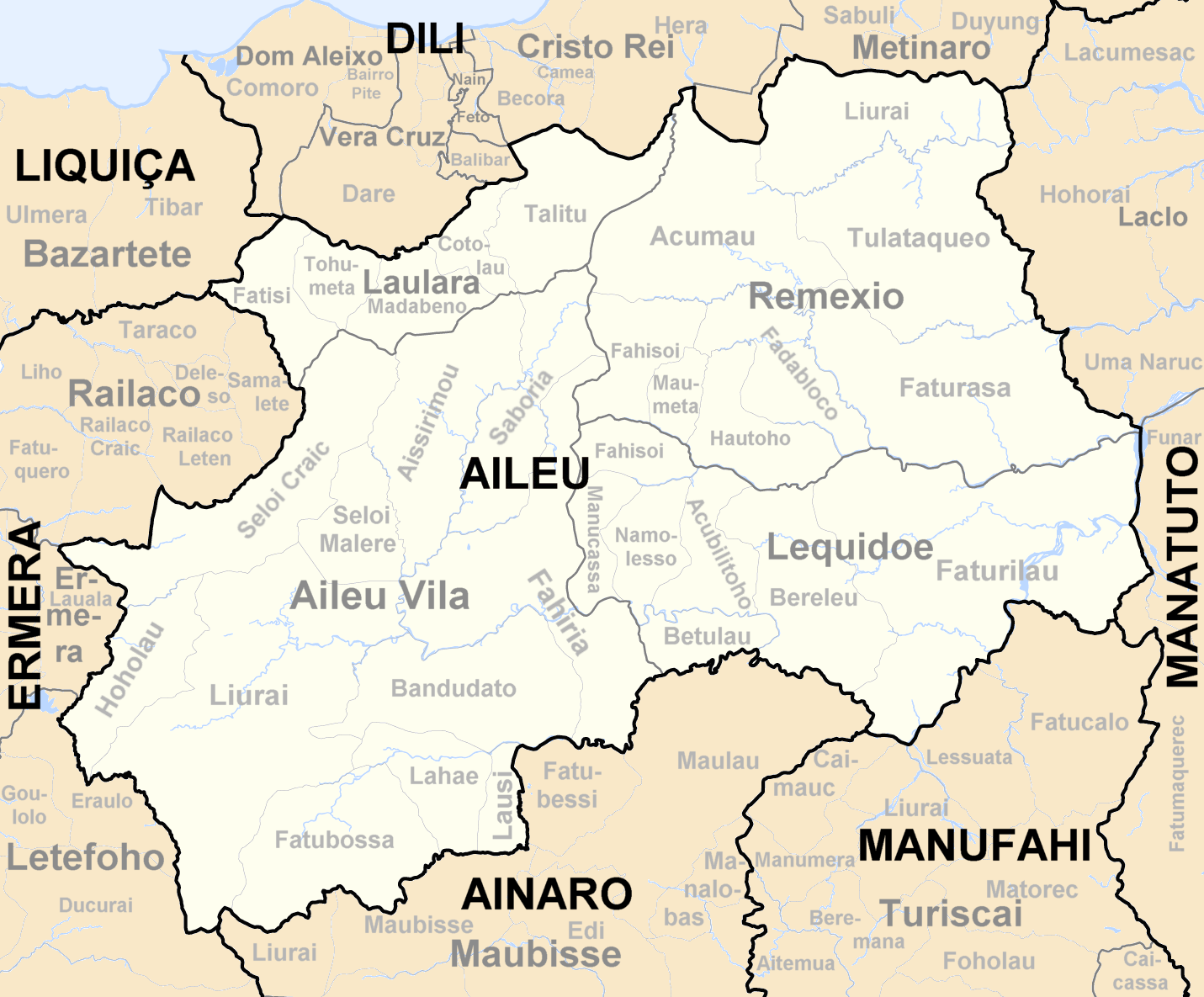
- Sucos of Aileu District
- Country: Timor-Leste
- District: Aileu
- Subdistrict: Aileu

Area
  - Total: 30.65 km^{2} (11.83 sq mi)

Population (2010)
  - Total: 1,426
- Time zone: UTC +9

Bandudato is a suco of Aileu subdistrict, Aileu District, Timor-Leste. The administrative area covers an area of 30.65 square kilometres and at the time of the 2010 census it had a population of 1,426 people.

== See also ==
- Sucos of Timor-Leste
