= Aissirimou =

Coordinates: 8°44′S 125°34′E

- Suco
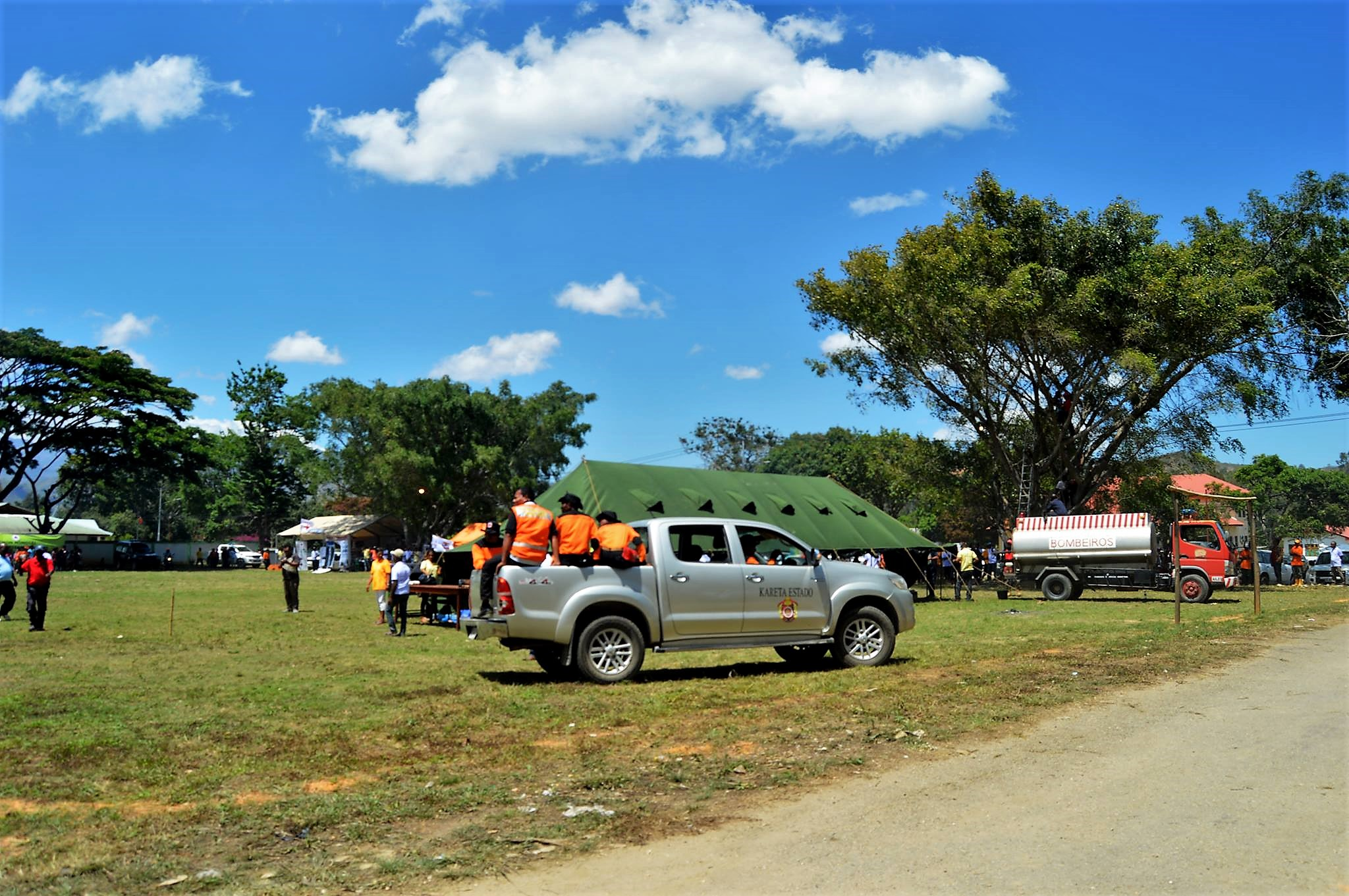
- Aissirimou

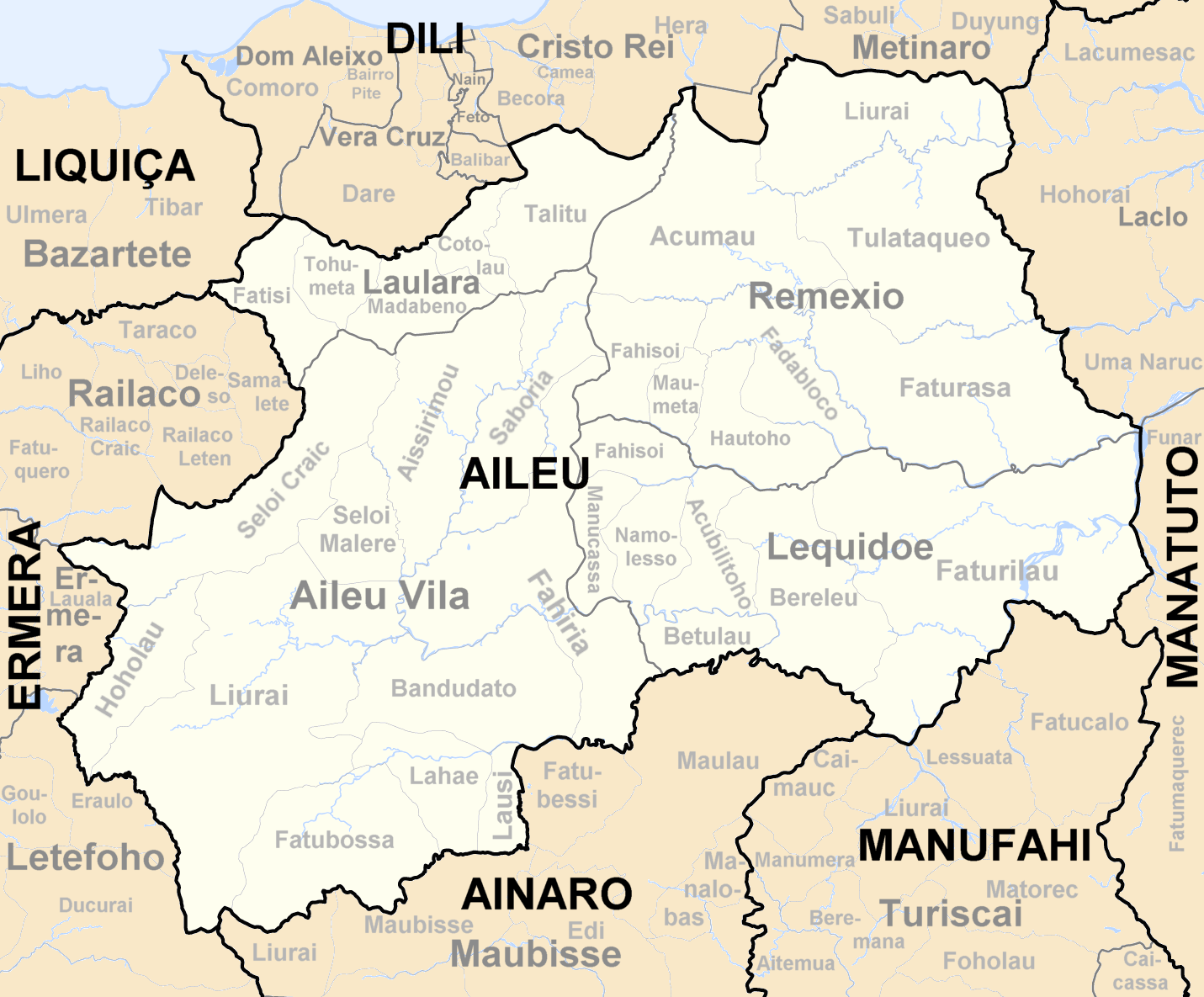
- Sucos of Aileu District
- Country: Timor-Leste
- District: Aileu
- Subdistrict: Aileu Subdistrict

Area
  - Total: 29.81 km^{2} (11.51 sq mi)

Population (2010)
  - Total: 2,192
- Time zone: UTC +9

Aissirimou is a village and suco (subdistricts of Timor-Leste) in Aileu Subdistrict, Aileu District, Timor-Leste. The administrative area covers an area of 29.81 square kilometres and at the time of the 2010 census it had a population of 2192 people.
