= Lausi =

Coordinates: 8.8161°S 125.5997°E

- Suco
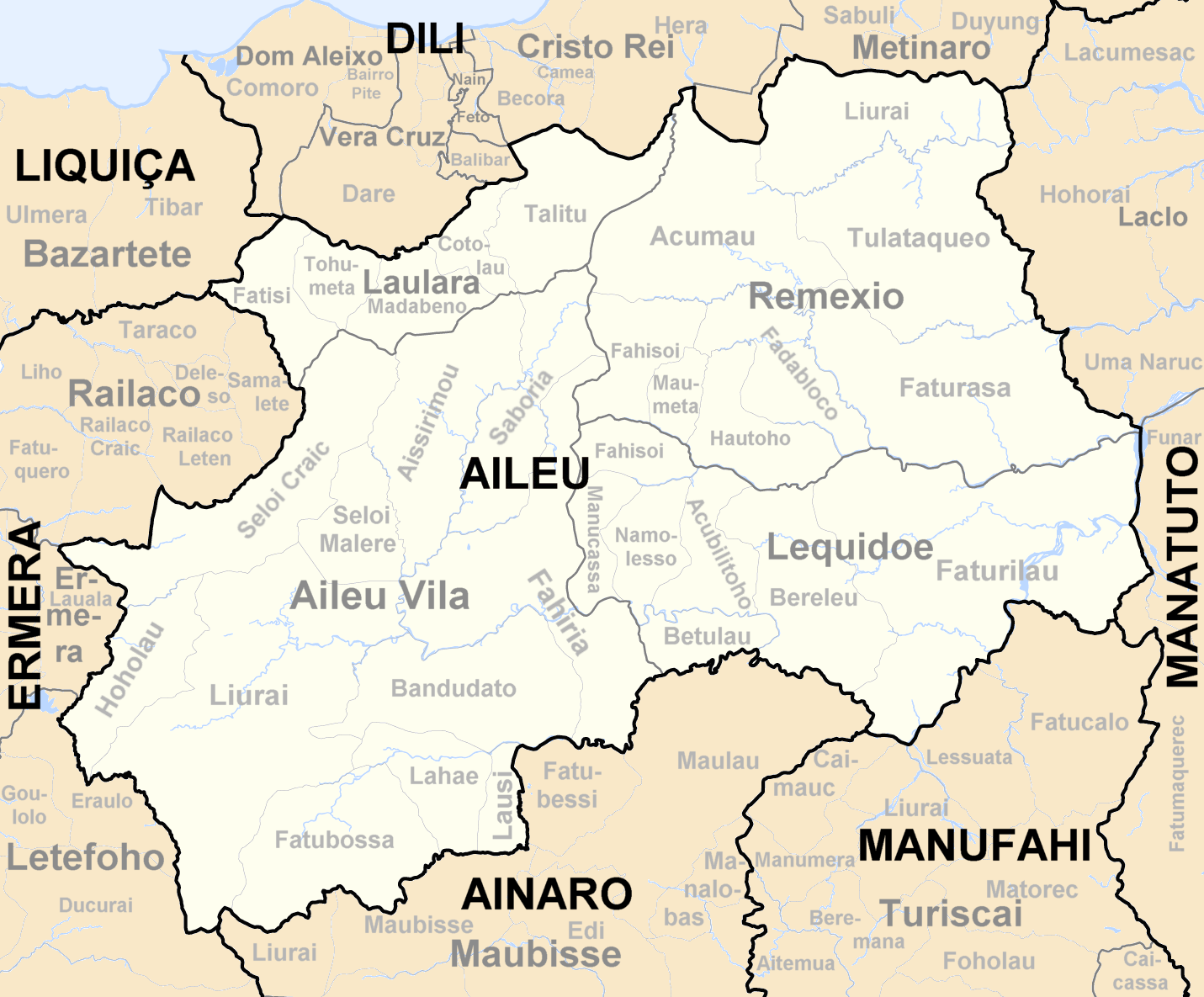
- Sucos of Aileu District
- Country: East Timor
- District: Aileu
- Subdistrict: Aileu

Area
  - Total: 5.24 km^{2} (2.02 sq mi)

Population (2010)
  - Total: 665
- Time zone: UTC +9

Lausi is a municipality (suco) in Aileu subdistrict, Aileu District, East Timor. The administrative area covers an area of 5.24 square kilometres and at the time of the 2010 census it had a population of 665 people.
