= Seloi Malere =

Coordinates: 8.7281°S 125.5664°E

- Suco
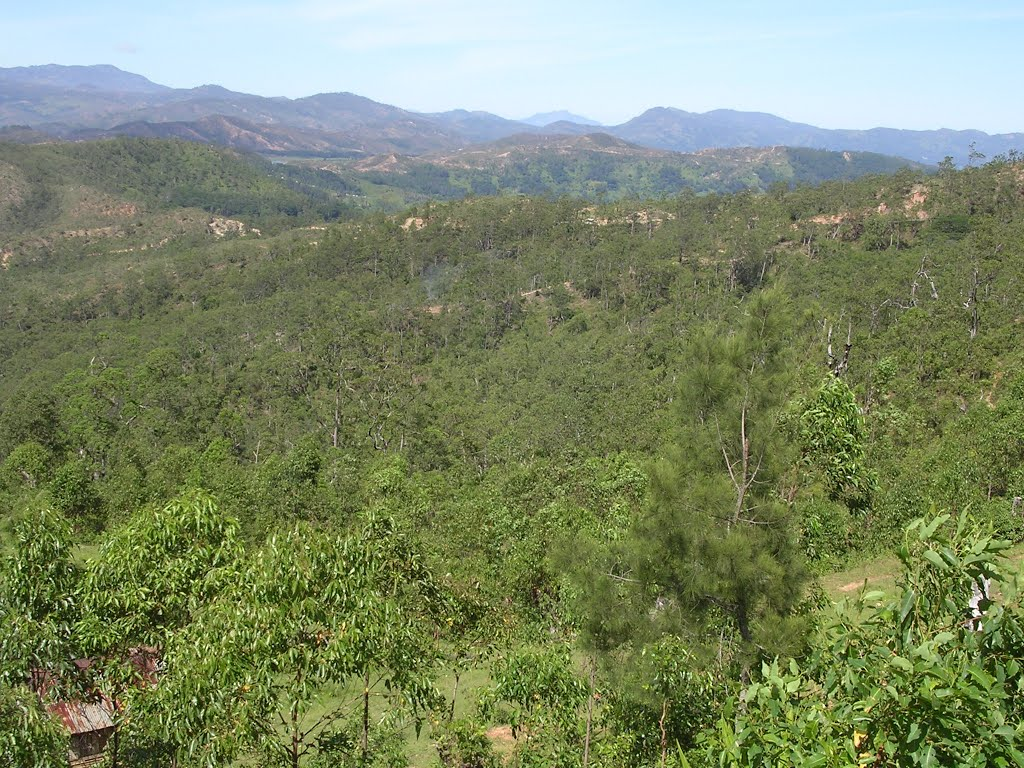

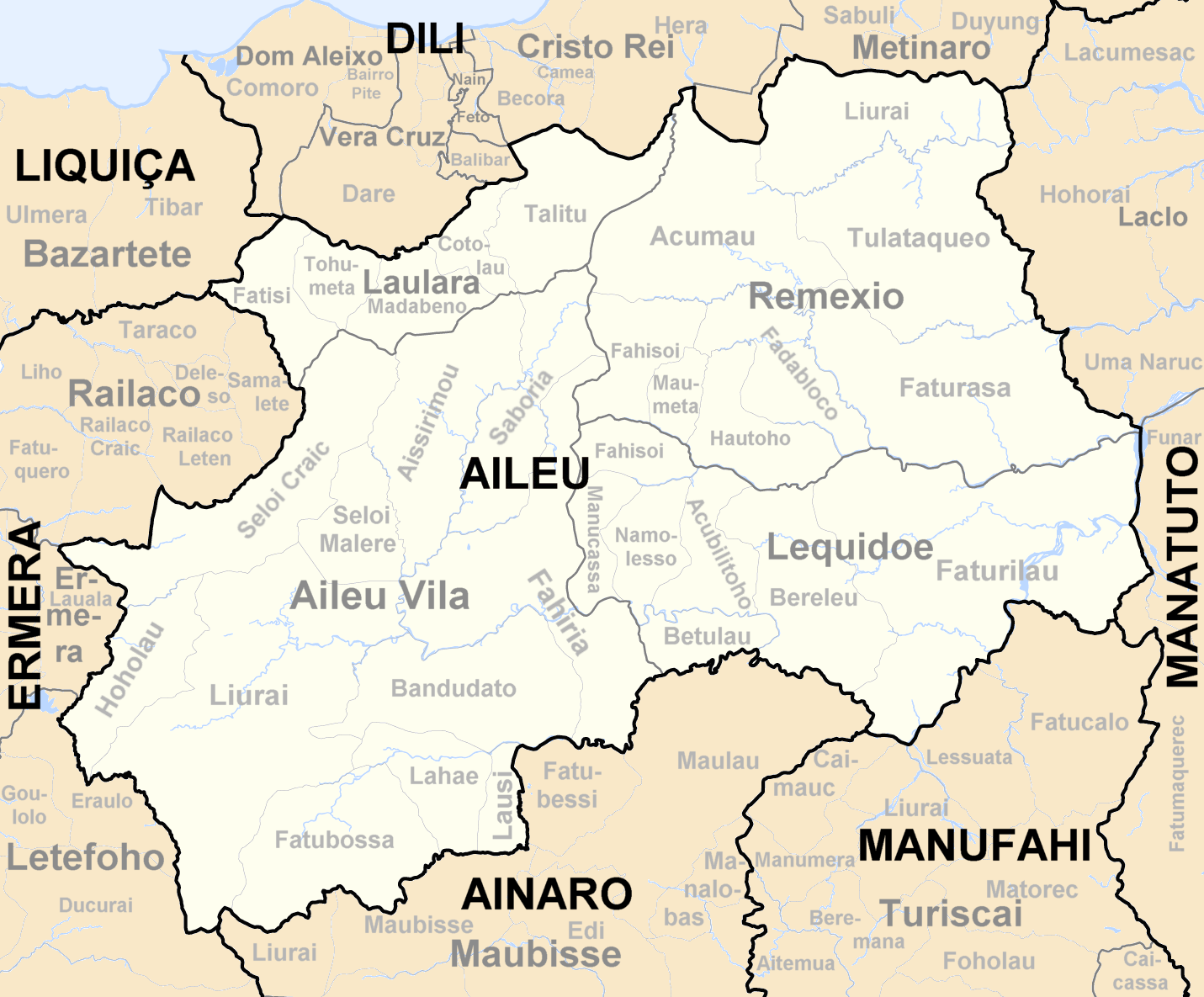
- Sucos of Aileu District
- Country: Timor-Leste
- District: Aileu
- Subdistrict: Aileu

Area
  - Total: 13 km^{2} (5.0 sq mi)

Population (2010)
  - Total: 3,676
- Time zone: UTC +9

Seloi Malere is a suco in Aileu subdistrict, Aileu District, Timor-Leste. The administrative area covers an area of 13 square kilometres and at the time of the 2010 census it had a population of 3676 people.
