= Loes River =

River in Timor-Leste

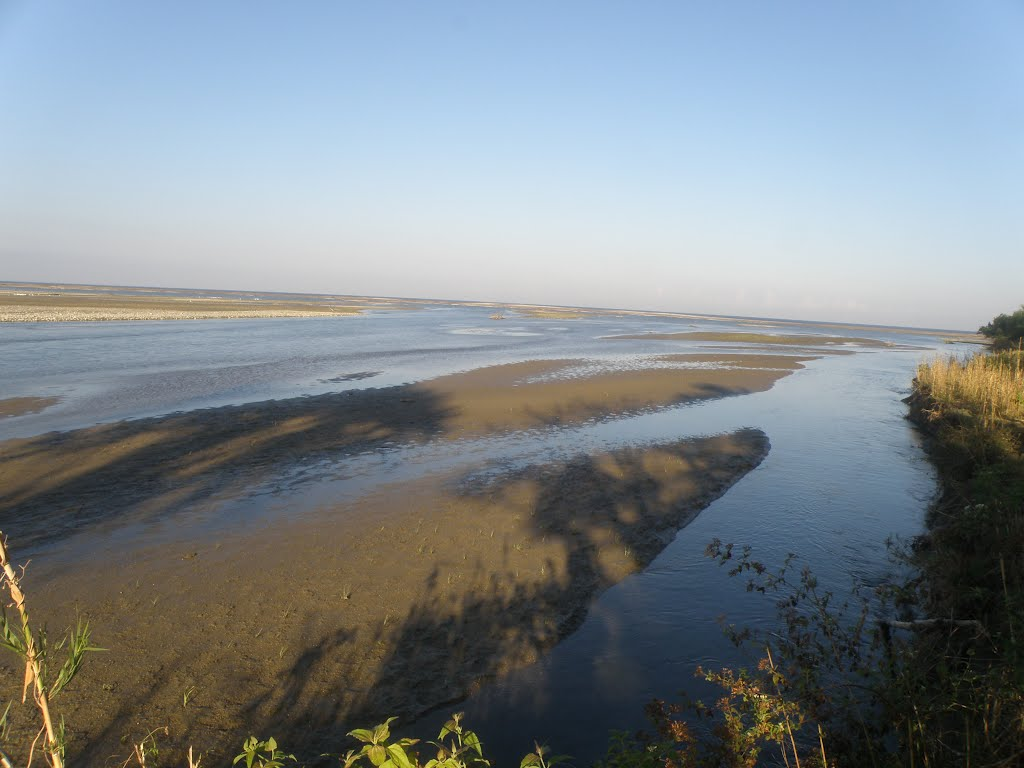
- View of the Loes River estuary

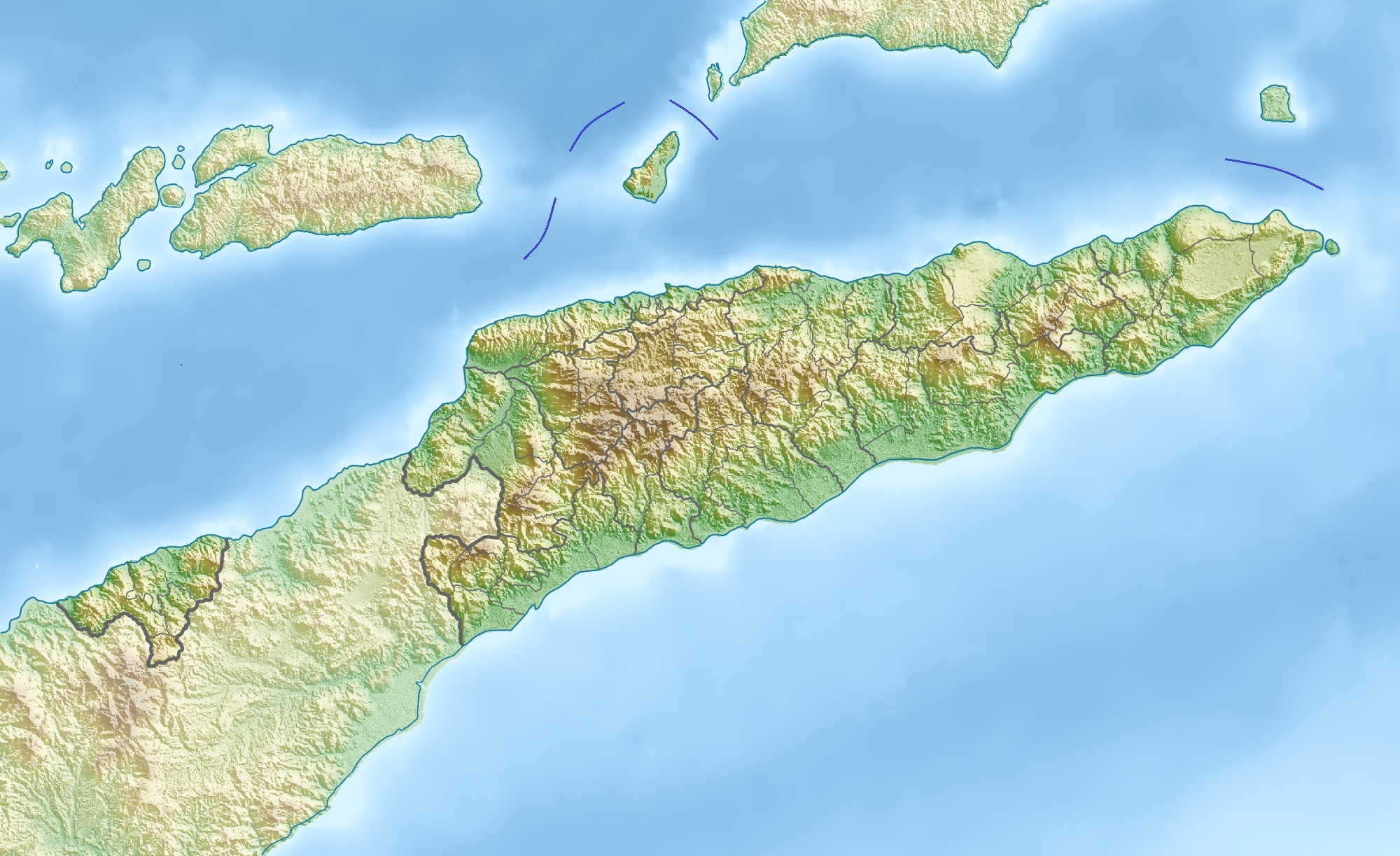
- Location of river mouth
- Native name: Ribeira de Lois /; Rio Lois (Portuguese); Mota Lois (Tetum)

Location
- Country: Timor-Leste
- Municipalities: Bobonaro; Ermera; Liquiçá

Physical characteristics
- Source confluence
  - location: Bobonaro / Liquiçá border
  - coordinates: 8°46′5″S 125°12′11″E
- Mouth: Ombai Strait
  - location: Rairobo / Vatuboro
  - coordinates: 8°44′30″S 125°05′31″E
- Length: 123 km (76 mi)
- Basin size: 2,633 km^{2} (1,017 sq mi)

Basin features
- Bridges: Loes Bridge

The Loes River (Portuguese: Ribeira de Lois or Rio Lois, Tetum: Mota Lois) is the longest river in Timor-Leste with a total length of 123 km (76 mi) and one of the few perennial rivers in the country's north.

The river combines with its tributaries to make up Timor-Leste's largest river system, and its catchment or drainage basin extends into the province of East Nusa Tenggara in Indonesia.

The river and tributaries drain from the central mountains of Timor in a generally northeasterly direction into Ombai Strait. However, the river itself flows in a northwesterly direction, along the border between Bobonaro and Liquiçá municipalities in Timor-Leste.

== Course ==
The river is fed by a large number of gullies, creeks, streams and other rivers. Its headwaters are mainly in the portion of Timor's central mountains ranging between, on the one hand, Belu Regency, Indonesia, and Cova Lima municipality, Timor-Leste, both southwest of the river's mouth, and, on the other hand, Liquiçá municipality, Timor-Leste, to the mouth's east.

From the southwestern headwaters, the river's southwestern and southern tributaries flow for the most part in a northeasterly direction through, or along the borders of, Belu Regency, Indonesia, and Bobonaro municipality, Timor-Leste (including borders with other municipalities), to the source of the river, at the confluence of the Nunura and Marobo rivers. That confluence is on the border between Bobonaro and Liquiçá municipalities, a short distance upstream of the tripoint between those two municipalities and Ermera municipality, Timor-Leste.

At the river's source confluence and at the tripoint, the waters of its southwestern and southern tributaries converge with the waters from its southeastern and eastern tributaries. The river then flows, generally in a northwesterly direction, along the border between Bobonaro and Liquiçá, until it discharges into Ombai Strait, at the western end of the border between Suco Rairobo, Atabae administrative post, Bobonaro, and Suco Vatuboro, Maubara administrative post, Liquiçá.

The river is one of the few perennial streams in the north of Timor-Leste, one of only three such northern watercourses that can potentially be inhabited by saltwater crocodiles all year round (the others being the North Laclo and the Seiçal). Its main channel, formed by the Marobo and Nunura Rivers, is braided, varies in width from about 200 m (660 ft) up to 1,400 m (4,600 ft), and is wider in its lower reaches.

At the mouth of the river, Ombai Strait is part of the Banda Sea, which extends a little further west, to longitude 125° East; beyond that meridian, the strait is part of the Savu Sea. A short distance upstream of the river mouth is the Loes Bridge, which was opened in 1991 and is the main bridge connecting West Timor, Indonesia, and Bobonaro with Dili, the national capital of Timor-Leste.

In order of entrance, the river's main tributaries include the following:

- Merak River: rises in Fatumean administrative post in the far north west of Cova Lima municipality; flows northwest into, and then northwards through, Belu Regency, to enter the Talau River (see below) on the border between Belu Regency and Suco Cová, Bobonaro municipality;
- Talau River (or Taipui River): rises at Atambua, Belu Regency, near the westernmost point of the border between Belu Regency and Bobonaro municipality, flows southeast, and then northeast, forming the border between those two territories, until it merges with the Malibacu River (see below) to form the Nunutura River (see below);
- Malibacu River (or Malibaca River): rises in Suco Tapo/Memo in south central Bobonaro municipality; flows northwest to the border between that municipality and Belu Regency, and then further northwest, forming the border between those two territories, until it merges with the Talau River (see above) to form the Nunutura River (see below);
- Nunutura River (or Nunura or Bebai River): flows from the confluence of the Talau and Malibacu Rivers (see above) northeast through Bobonaro municipality to the border between Bobonaro and Liquiçá municipalities, very close to the tripoint between those two municipalities and Ermera municipality, where it merges with the Marobo River (see below) to form the Loes River;
- Bulobo River: rises near Maliana in south central Bobonaro; flows generally northwards until it enters the Nunutura River (see above) in central Bobonaro municipality;
- Marobo River: rises in Bobonaro municipality, near the southern point of the border between Bobonaro and Ermera municipalities; flows northwest, for the most part forming the border between those two municipalities, to the border between Bobonaro and Liquiçá municipalities a short distance southeast of the tripoint between those two municipalities and Ermera municipality, where it merges with the Nunutura River (see above) to form the Loes River;
- Gleno River (or Lauveli River): rises near Gleno in northeastern Ermera municipality, where it is fed in part by water draining from Lake Lehumo; flows generally westwards, largely along the border between Ermera and Liquiçá municipalities, until it enters the Loes River at the tripoint between Bobonaro, Ermera and Liquiçá municipalities, a short distance northwest of the latter's source.

== History ==
For the period 1953 to 1979, which included the final years of the Portuguese colonial era in Timor-Leste, the colonial administration's Plans of Development (Portuguese: Planes de Fomento) identified the river as one of the locations targeted for the boosting of agricultural development. The III Plan of Development, for the years 1968 to 1973, placed particular importance on that objective.

In 1979, during the Indonesian occupation of East Timor that had begun in 1975, the Indonesian army took over the Liquiçá area, and certain reconstruction work was commenced there.

Two years later, Catholic Relief Services (CRS) and the United States Agency for International Development (USAID) established the East Timor Agricultural Development Project (ETDAEP), which was later transferred to Timorese control, under the name ETADEP Foundation. In the mid-1980s, some agricultural development work was started in the catchment, and cattle were distributed for use in ploughing muddy paddy fields. In about 1985, work began on the construction of an irrigation system. Some transmigration also took place, mostly from within the local area.

At the beginning of this century, Timor-Leste resumed the independence it had declared in 1975, immediately before it was invaded by Indonesia. In 2015, the governments of Timor-Leste and Indonesia entered into a Memorandum of Understanding (MOU) on the Forestry Sector, as the first step of a commitment to manage shared natural resources jointly. One of the areas of cooperation for which the MOU provided was the management of cross-border catchments. In 2019, the two governments developed the Talau-Loes Management Plan Integrated Flow River Area or RPDAS. In 2020, the Global Environment Facility and the two governments initiated the Management of Indonesian and Timor-Leste Transboundary Watersheds (MITLTW) project, with the objective of ensuring "... collaborative management of freshwater ecosystems and protect[ing] water, food and livelihood security ..." in the catchment and another cross-border catchment.

== Catchment ==
The river combines with its tributaries to make up Timor-Leste's largest river system. Its catchment or drainage basin has a total area of approximately 2,633 km^{2} (1,017 sq mi), including part of the province of East Nusa Tenggara in Indonesia.

The East Timorese portion of the catchment is the largest of that country's catchments, but sources vary as to its size. Sources published before 2020 state that the East Timorese portion has a total area of 2,418 km^{2} (934 sq mi) (Note: Some sources, published more recently than 2006, mistranscribe this figure as either 2,148 km^{2} (829 sq mi) or 2,184 km^{2} (843 sq mi).) (almost 15% of the whole country), and that about 9% of the catchment lies in Indonesia. However, according to the official description of the MITLTW project, published in 2020, about 1,886.8 km^{2} (728.5 sq mi) (72%) of the catchment sits within Timor-Leste and approximately 726.48 km^{2} (280.50 sq mi) (28%) of it falls within Indonesia, where it is known as the Talau River catchment.

Timor-Leste has been broadly divided into twelve 'hydrologic units', which are groupings of climatologically and physiographically similar and adjacent river catchments. The East Timorese portion of the Talau/Loes catchment is the only major catchment in the Loes hydrologic unit. Of the ten transboundary catchments in the Indonesia/Timor-Leste border area, the Talau/Loes catchment is the largest, and has the greatest water use and accessibility.

The baseline scenario for the two catchments the subject of the MITLW project, including the Talau/Loes catchment, is characterised in the project documentation as: "continuation of poorly managed land uses, particularly agriculture, grazing and other activities degrading and removing forests/vegetation, which then contribute to soil degradation and loss, uncontrolled water flows, and associated deterioration in food and water security." The project aims to implement over a five-year period an alternative scenario achieving better protection of food, water and livelihood security within the two catchments.

In Indonesia, the Talau/Loes catchment covers 10 districts and 61 villages in Belu Regency. In Timor-Leste, it ranges across 19 administrative posts and 120 sucos in six municipalities, namely Aileu, Ainaro, Bobonaro, Cova Lima, Ermera and Liquiçá. As of 2020, the catchment's population was around 191,000 in the Talau portion and 163,000 in the Loes portion, or about 354,000 in total. Its upstream sector is a water conservation area with a very small population. Its midstream is the most densely populated sector, and is used for transportation and water extraction. Its downstream links to and supplies water and sediment flows into Timor-Leste's mainland and coastal ecotone area.

The catchment's elevation ranges from 1,500 m (4,900 ft) AMSL to sea level in the Talau portion, and from between 3,000 m (9,800 ft) and 2,000 m (6,600 ft) AMSL to sea level in the Loes portion. Its topography is dominated by slightly steep to steep slopes (according to the MITLTW project description, the area so dominated is 1,438.5 km^{2} (555.4 sq mi) or 55% of the catchment's total area). The dominant form of drainage system in the catchment is parallel pattern drainage.

The catchment has a monsoon type climate, with a clear distinction between just two seasons, rainy and dry. The rainy season lasts about 6–7 months each year, and annual rainfall depends upon elevation and location. Over the catchment as a whole, average annual rainfall is around 1,600 mm (63 in), and is more than offset by high evaporation averaging 1,800 mm (71 in) per annum. In the upper reaches of the Talau River, it is between 1,500 mm (59 in) and 1,750 mm (69 in), and in the midstream of that river, it ranges from 1,250 mm (49 in) to 1,500 mm (59 in). In the upstream Loes River area, it can be more than 2,000 mm (79 in), in the midstream it is around 1,700 mm (67 in), and downstream it is between 1,200 mm (47 in) and 1,750 mm (69 in).

According to a rapid appraisal of part of the Indonesian portion of the catchment published in 2008, the main hydrological concerns of the stakeholders in that area were sensitivity to climate variability, imbalance of water demand and supply in dry periods, and soil erosion that could cause further degradation to the landscape. The overall pattern of river flow was described as having three phases: the early part of the rainy season when the soil and landscape water storage capacity was recharged, the second part when a larger proportion of the rainfall was transmitted to the river, and the dry season when water flow depended on the gradual release of stored water. The report of the appraisal suggested catchment improvement activities such as water harvesting during the rainy season using semi-constructed ponds; soil management in the form of terracing and infiltration pits in tree-based systems, to avoid further soil degradation, and the planting of trees.

Another rapid assessment, conducted in 2019, reported that there were several threats impacting the catchment. They included climate change and increasing variability in water availability; insufficient recharge areas; geomorphology that facilitated erosion, sedimentation and flooding; land use conflicts and over-exploitation of resources; and deforestation and land degradation. At the end of the 20th century, the total area of tree cover on the catchment's surface was more than 75%, but by 2019 it was down to only around 22%. Additionally, the catchment's low water availability baseline combined with poor soil and land management to result in low discharge and insufficient water reserves. Other hazard risks included biophysical vulnerability.

== Geology ==
The geological complexes and formations located underneath the catchment are the Aileu Formation, Bobonaro Complex, Viqueque Formation, Wailuli Formation, Cablac Limestone, Aitutu Formation and Lolotoi Complex. These lithodemic units are made up of sedimentary rocks, including shales, sandstone, siltstones, mudstones, calcilutite, calcarenite, calcirudites, marl, and conglomerates, and also some metamorphic rocks such as phyllites and other metamorphose sedimentary and eruptive rocks.

The catchment's dominant parent rocks have been recorded as old, recent clastic, metamorphic, and uplifted coral limestones. The sediments and deposited fragments in the catchment include silt, uplifted coral, phyllite, quartzites, schist, and alluvial and sandy marl (known as Bobonaro formation). A mineral grain analysis of the sand from the river carried out in 2014 identified quartz, lithic fragment, feldspar, muscovite, pyroxene, magnetite, zircon, olivine, and garnet grains.

Soil types in the catchment include vertisols, entisols, and inceptisols formed from the weathering sandstones, together with clay stones and uplifted coral limestones. These soil types can easily convert water into gravitational water, but will also hold the water so strongly as make it difficult for trees to absorb water by the roots.

== Economy ==
=== Agriculture ===
About 90% of the catchment's residents carry on small scale agriculture, mostly the cultivation of subsistence crops, to earn their household income.

The main crops grown in the catchment are maize, upland and lowland rice, beans, tubers, fruits and vegetables. Those crops are not produced in quantities sufficient to meet the needs of the catchment's residents for food; water shortages are thought to be a significant factor in relation to that problem. Other catchment crops include cassava. Tree crops are also grown in the catchment; they include mangos, jackfruit, coconuts, cashew nuts, candle nuts, kapok, oranges, and betel nuts, all of which are cultivated extensively around water springs, and bananas. Additionally, catchment farmers raise livestock, including cattle, pigs, chickens, and goats; these are often kept mainly for special occasions and important events.

Shifting cultivation and unrestricted cattle grazing in the catchment lead to a reduction in forested areas, infertile soils, and low productivity/biomass. These outcomes lead to increased runoff and reduced infiltration, which, in turn, worsen the existing imbalances between rainfall and evaporation.

A further crop grown in the catchment is coffee. The largest coffee plantation in the catchment is located in its upper reaches, and is owned by SAPT (Sociedade Agrícola Pátria e Trabalho).

In the production of rice and other crops in the catchment, as elsewhere in Timor-Leste, both technical steps and ritual practices are considered necessary. One such ritual is nahe biti (lit. transl. stretching or laying down the mat to facilitate consensus, or reconciliation), by which the crop is subjected to ritual action that changes its status from moruk (transl. poisonous, bitter) to midar (transl. delicious, sweet).

Nahe biti is performed during the harvesting of wet rice, to establish a communication channel with the river and thereby observe due reciprocity with it. The ritual normally begins with the placing of rice stalks and dishes of betel leaves and areca nuts on a mat and the recitation of prayers. Then comes the offering of glasses of wine and a pig, followed by the sacrifice and cooking of the pig with the other ingredients. Some of the stalks, tied into a cross-like form known as biko, are then each tied to a stick that is driven into the ground in the rice paddy until the harvest is finished.

The harvesters perform the nahe biti ritual in the belief that the spirits of their ancestors and the river arrive in the rice paddy upon performance of the ritual, and stay there until the harvesters let them know the harvest has been completed. The harvesters make that communication by performing another ritual, sobu tenda, which involves the sacrifice of a chicken.

=== Fishing ===
In Timor-Leste, involvement in fishing is low by comparison with other small island countries. Along the north coast of Timor, including near the mouth of the Loes River, fishing levels are higher than elsewhere in the country, other than in pockets along parts of the south coast. Many of the north coast fishers fish part time or seasonally, and are otherwise occupied in additional activities such as carpentry, labouring or security work. Most of their fish landings are of small pelagic species, including short-bodied mackerel, sardines (Clupeidae), halfbeaks and scads (Carangidae).

In the coastal village of Biacou (or Beacou), south of the Loes River mouth, most households earn their living from fishing or gleaning. During the rainy season, turbid water flows a long way out into the strait from the river mouth. Schools of fish gather at the river plume to feed and hide from larger fish, and sardines are at their most abundant. Using motorized canoes, Biacou fishers travel around 10 km (6.2 mi) to catch the sardines. After they are brought ashore, most are sold to traders. Some are cooked with locally grown garlic, red onion, and peppercorns, preserved in glass jars, and then sold at markets. Others are retained for local consumption. In the dry season, the river water becomes clear, and the fish disperse.

A study published in 2019 observed that fishing vessels in and around Bobonaro were dominated by non-motorized and outboard motorized boats. Gill nets and handlines were widely used. Fishing grounds were limited, and the activities of fishermen were highly disrupted by a growing number of illegal fishing practices. Small pelagic fish in the Indonesia – Timor-Leste border area in Ombai Strait were regarded as shared fish stock and captured by fishermen from both countries. The report of the study recommended transboundary fisheries management in the border area, using an ecosystem-based approach.

A 2021 study focused in particular upon two fishing sites on the north coast of Timor-Leste, one of them being the fishery near the Loes River mouth. It concluded that a number of sardine species (and also other small pelagic fish) were caught in the Loes River mouth fishery, with flat-bodied sardinellas (S. gibbosa etc.) being the dominant species group landed there. Catches of the pelagic species varied moderately between years, and were larger during the rainy season and when medium-sized turbid plumes were extending from the river mouth. Fishers generally perceived a decline in landings over the previous 20 years. They attributed the decline to several human factors, including higher fishing effort, plastic pollution, motorisation of canoes and larger-scale, less selective fishing gear. Some sardine species were sold readily to traders; others were commonly kept for immediate home consumption.

Along the river itself, fisherwomen capture freshwater shrimp, which they then hawk to passing road users on the Loes Bridge. In the past, shrimp were harvested with hand-woven nets, but the women now prefer to use traps made from plastic bottles. Some unsold shrimp become ingredients in boek kari (shrimp curry). Others are combined with mackerel or bullet tuna (Auxis rochei) and converted into fish powder. Local women also catch ipu, small indigenous fish, in the river, mix them with locally made salt, and then pickle them in small bottles for up to a year.

=== Hydroelectricity ===
The catchment has been assessed as having potential for the construction of a large scale multi-purpose dam to harvest raw water and generate hydroelectricity by hydropower.

=== Mining ===
In November 2022, the Timor-Leste government, through its Council of Ministers, approved the opening of concession areas in three rivers, including the Loes River, for the mining of industrial minerals to be used in the production of construction materials.

Also approved in November 2022 were tender terms for the award of mining rights in the concession areas.

Each of the three rivers has abundant sediments transported from upstream in its catchment, or created by erosion of its banks. The sediments are deposited as either gravel or sand on the river's braided flood plains. After being deposited, the gravel and sand can be extracted and used primarily in the construction of small- to medium scale projects.

The Loes River concession has a total estimated surface area of 834 ha (2,060 acres). It is made up of two zones, one 500 m (1,600 ft) upstream of the Loes Bridge, and the other 500 m downstream of the bridge and 500 m away from the Ombai Strait shoreline.

== See also ==
- List of rivers of Timor-Leste
