= Remexio Administrative Post =

Administrative post in Aileu Municipality, Timor-Leste

Remexio
- Administrative Post
- Posto Administrativo de Remexio (Portuguese); Postu administrativu Remesiu (Tetun)
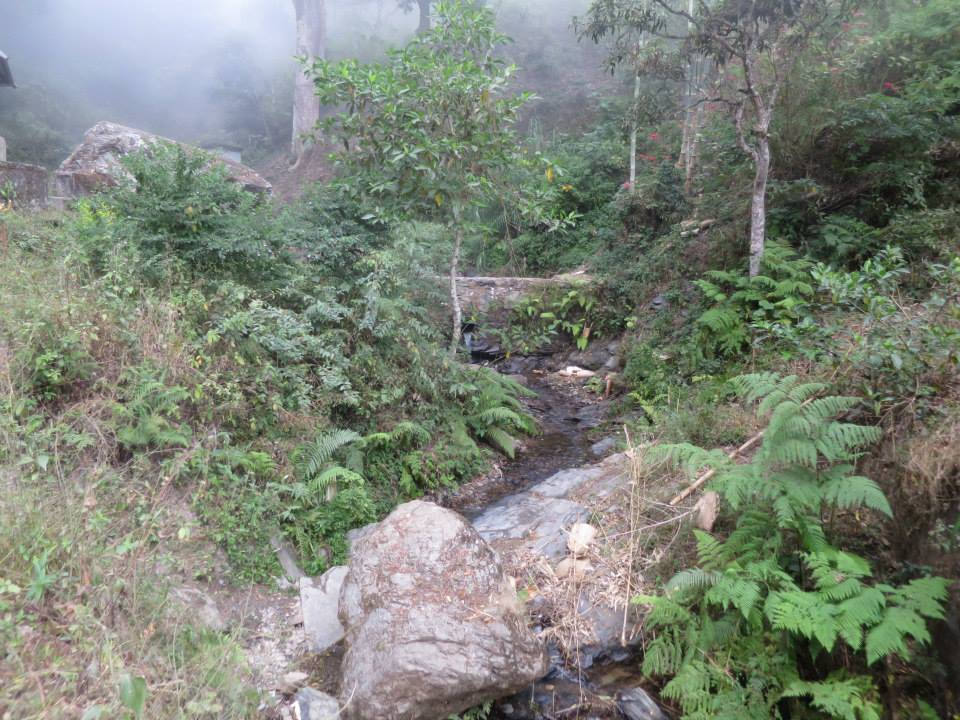
- Stream near Remexio

- Official map

- Location within East Timor
- Coordinates: 8°36′56″S 125°39′59″E
- Country: Timor-Leste
- Municipality: Aileu
- Seat: Acumau
- Sucos: Acumau; Fadabloco; Fahisoi; Faturasa; Hautoho; Liurai; Maumeta; Tulataqueo

Area
  - Total: 210.9 km^{2} (81.4 sq mi)

Population (2015 census)
  - Total: 10,933
  - Density: 51.84/km^{2} (134.3/sq mi)

Households (2015 census)
  - Total: 1,656
- Time zone: UTC+09:00 (TLT)

Remexio, officially Remexio Administrative Post (Portuguese: Posto Administrativo de Remexio, Tetun: Postu administrativu Remesiu), is an administrative post (and was formerly a subdistrict) in Aileu municipality, Timor-Leste. Its seat or administrative centre is Acumau.
