= Liurai, Aileu Administrative Post =

Coordinates: 8.7583°S 125.5383°E

Liurai
- Suco
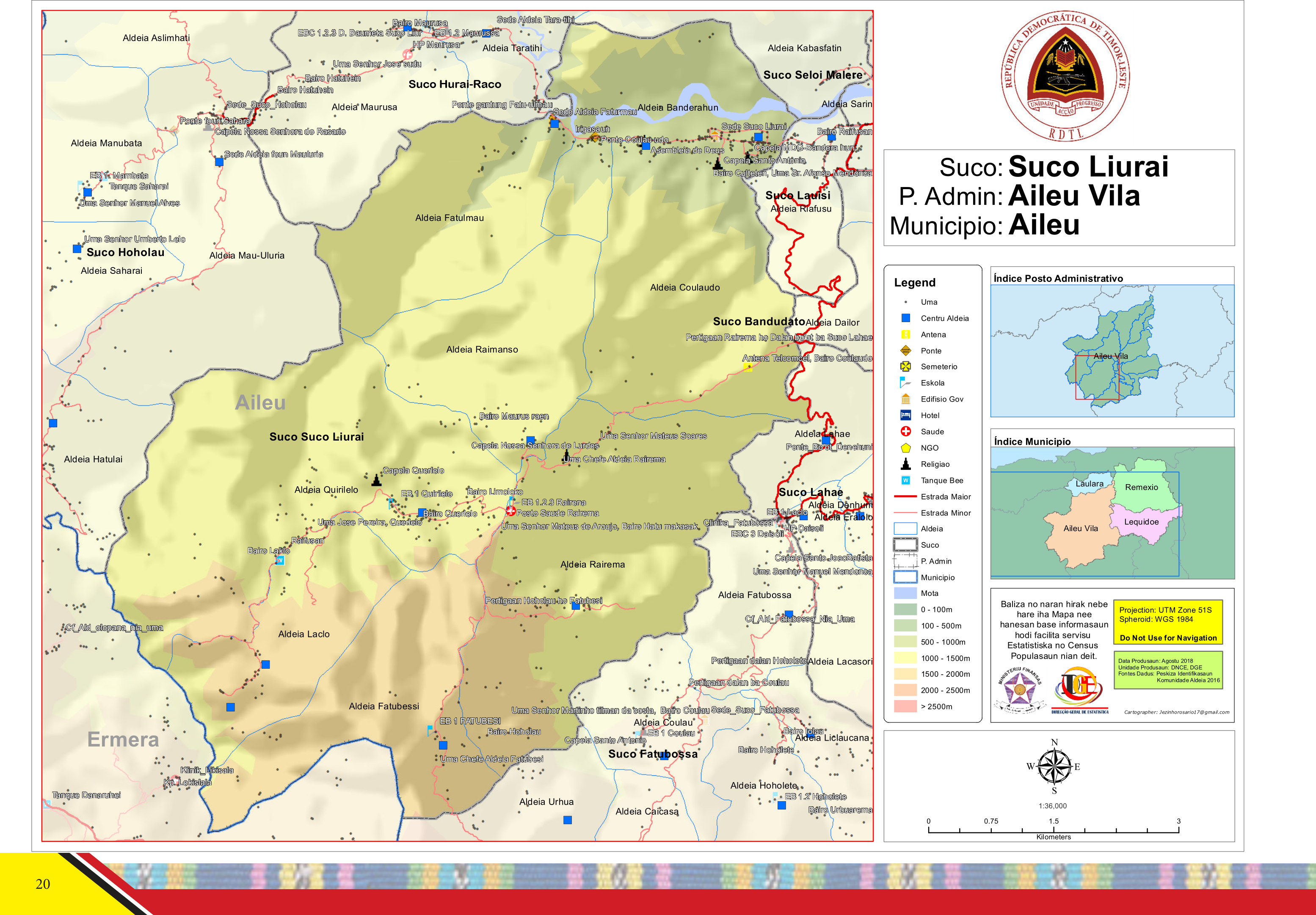
- Liurai suco
- Country: Timor-Leste
- District: Aileu
- Subdistrict: Aileu Subdistrict

Area
  - Total: 10.33 km^{2} (3.99 sq mi)

Population (2010)
  - Total: 4,499
- Time zone: UTC +9

Liurai is a suco in Aileu Administrative Post, Aileu Municipality, Timor-Leste. The administrative area covers an area of 10.33 square kilometres and at the time of the 2010 census it had a population of 4499 people.
