= Lequidoe Administrative Post =

Administrative post in Aileu Municipality, Timor-Leste

Lequidoe
- Administrative Post
- Posto Administrativo de Lequidoe (Portuguese); Postu administrativu Lekidoe (Tetum)
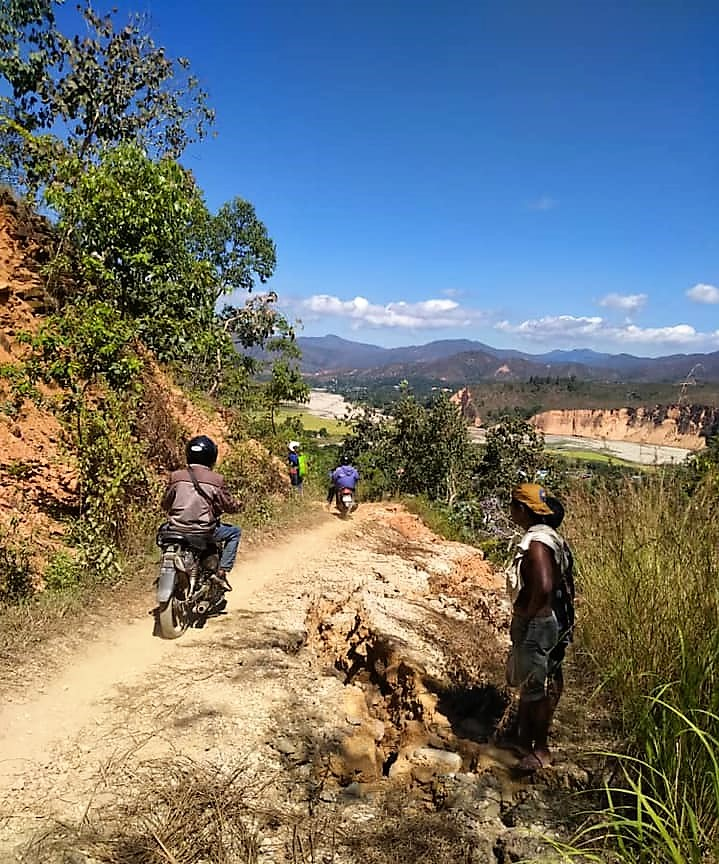
- Road near Lequidoe

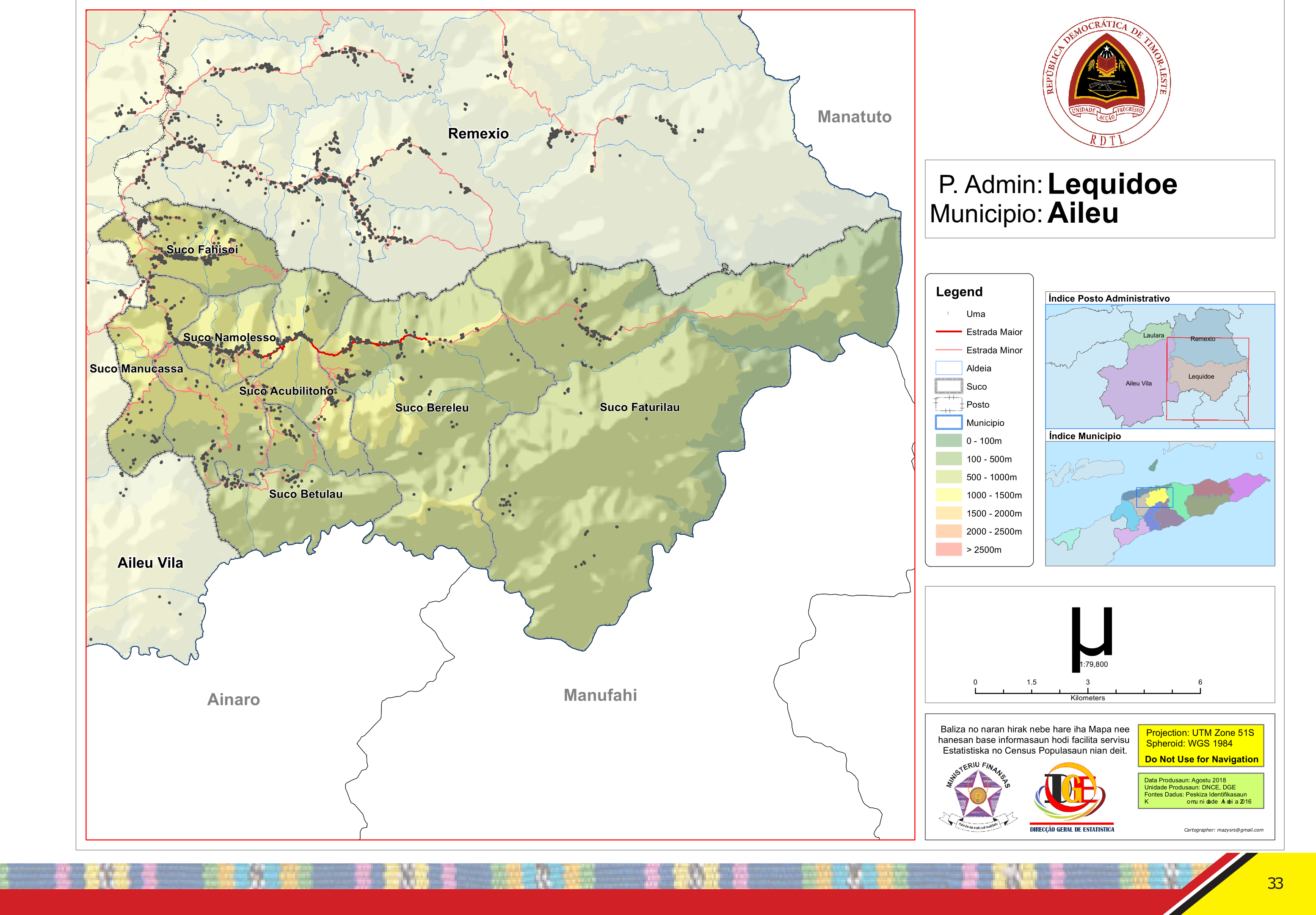
- Official map

- Location within East Timor
- Coordinates: 8°41′29″S 125°38′10″E
- Country: Timor-Leste
- Municipality: Aileu
- Seat: Namolesso
- Sucos: Acubilitoho; Bereleu; Betulau; Fahisoi; Faturilau; Manucassa; Namolesso

Area
  - Total: 137.4 km^{2} (53.1 sq mi)

Population (2015 census)
  - Total: 6,765
  - Density: 49.24/km^{2} (127.5/sq mi)

Households (2015 census)
  - Total: 1,030
- Time zone: UTC+09:00 (TLT)

Lequidoe, officially Lequidoe Administrative Post (Portuguese: Posto Administrativo de Lequidoe, Tetum: Postu administrativu Lequidoe), is an administrative post (and was formerly a subdistrict) in Aileu municipality, Timor-Leste. Its seat or administrative centre is Namolesso.
