= Seloi Craic =

Coordinates: 8.7107°S 125.5209°E

- Suco
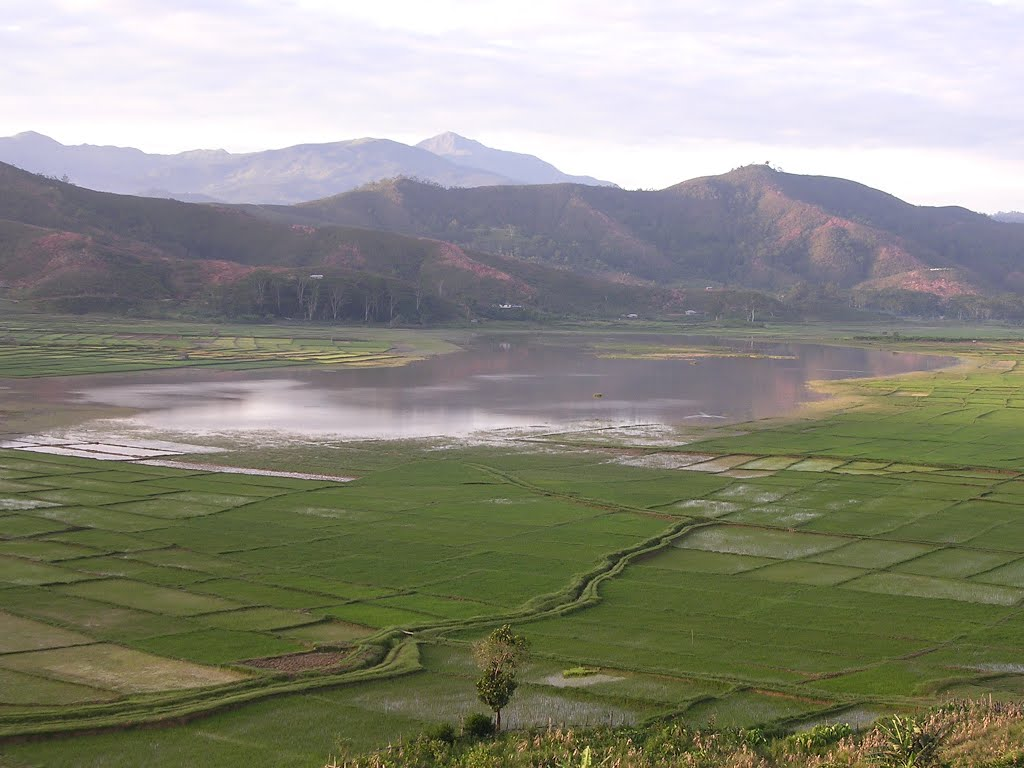
- Wet season view of flooded verdant ricefields and Lake Seloi

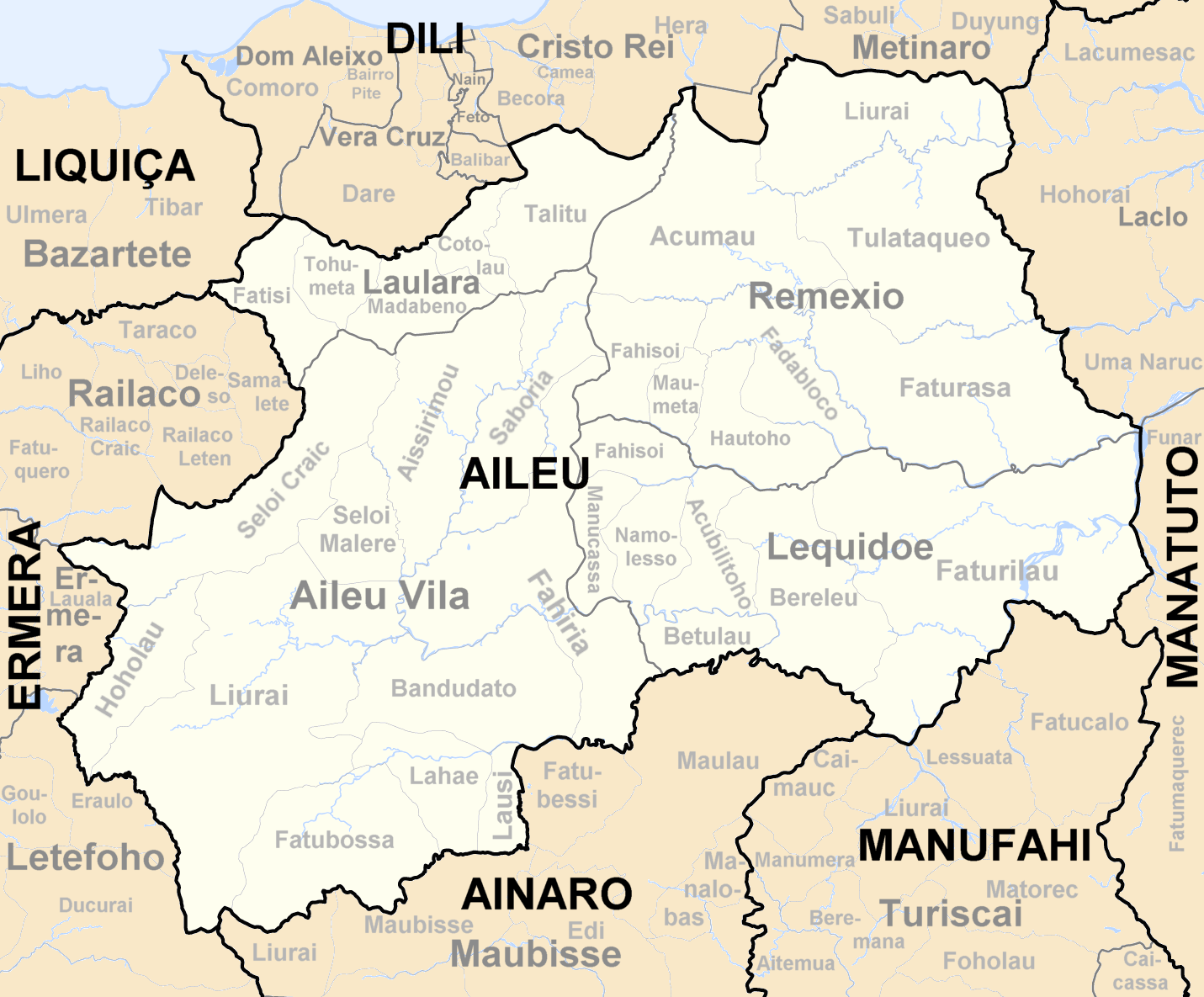
- Sucos of Aileu District
- Country: Timor-Leste
- District: Aileu
- Subdistrict: Aileu

Area
  - Total: 36.87 km^{2} (14.24 sq mi)

Population (2010)
  - Total: 3,328
- Time zone: UTC +9

Seloi Craic (Seloi Kraik) is a suco in Aileu subdistrict, Aileu District, Timor-Leste. The administrative area covers an area of 36.87 square kilometres and at the time of the 2010 census it had a population of 3328 people.
