= Aileu =

- City
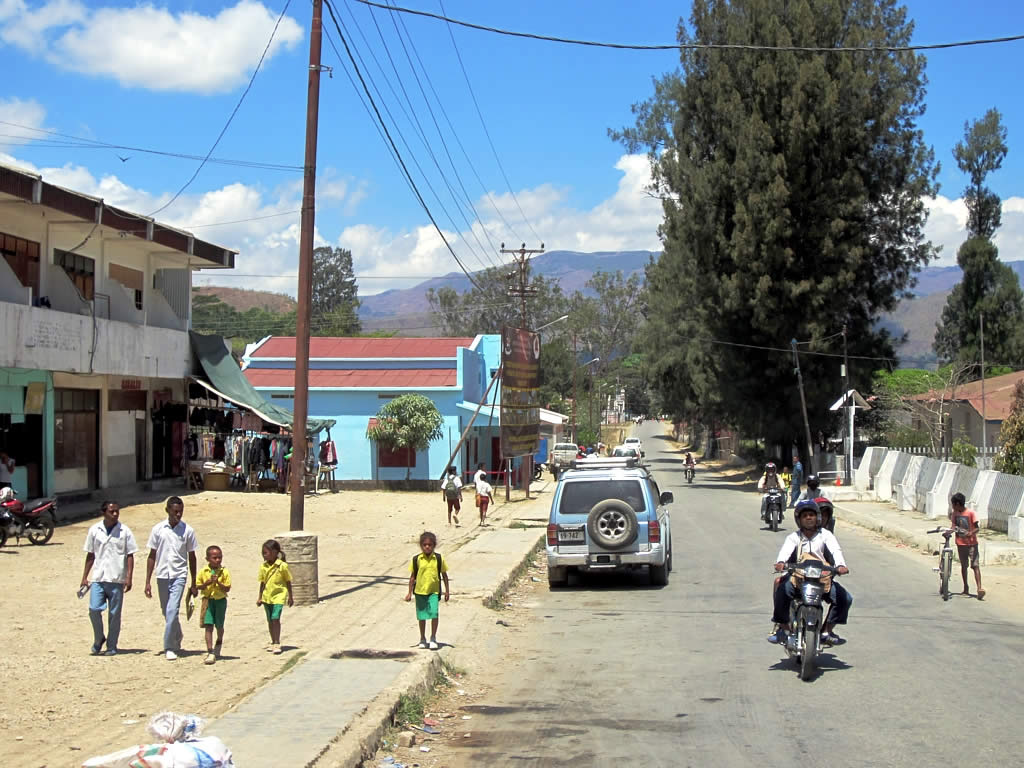

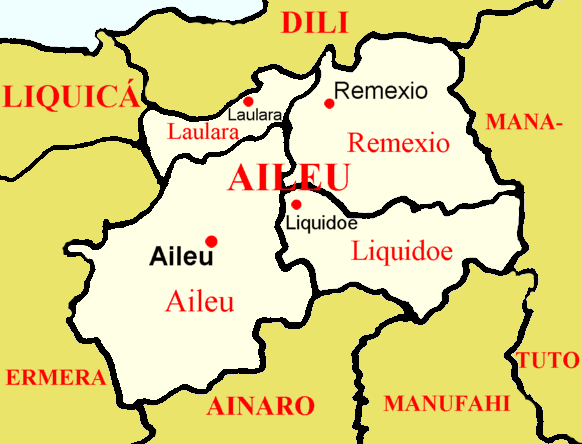

- Location in Timor-Leste
- Coordinates: 8°43′S 125°34′E
- Country: Timor-Leste
- Municipality: Aileu
- Administrative post: Aileu
- Sucos: Seloi Malere, Liurai

Area
  - Total: 251.48 km^{2} (97.10 sq mi)
- Elevation: 1,182 m (3,878 ft)

Population (2015)
  - Total: 2,788
  - Density: 11.09/km^{2} (28.71/sq mi)
  - Ethnicities: Tetum Mambai
  - Religions: Majority Catholic small groups of Protestants and animists
- Time zone: UTC+09:00 (TLT)
- Climate: Am

Aileu is a city in Aileu District, Timor-Leste. It is located 47 km (29 mi) southwest of Dili, the national capital, and had a population of 2,788 in 2015. In Portuguese Timor, the city was known as Vila General Carmona, after the Portuguese dictator António Óscar Carmona, but after World War II it was renamed. Aileu means "bent tree" in Mambai.

== History ==
In 1903, a rebellion staged in Aileu against the colonial rulers failed. In January 1912, it served as a Portuguese base against the rebellion of Manufahi.

Between 1942 and 1945, the Japanese occupied Portuguese Timor. On August 31, 1942, the town was invaded by Colunas Negras, the Timorese allies of the Japanese invaders. Five Portuguese soldiers, as well as several civil servants and missionaries, were killed. A memorial in Aileu commemorates the massacre today.

Indonesian soldiers set up a relocation camp in Aileu for the East Timorese at the end of 1979. In early September, during the 1999 East Timorese crisis, residents of various sucos in the area were expelled from their homes by the Aku Hidup dengan Integrasi militia of Indonesia. The Seloi Craic suco was destroyed on September 6, the houses burned down and livestock slaughtered.

At the end of 1999, there were temporary plans to make Aileu the new capital of an independent East Timor. These were rejected in favor of Dili.

== Sister Cities ==
- City of Merri-bek, Australia
