= Aileu Municipality =

Municipality of East Timor

Aileu
- Municipality
- Município Aileu (Portuguese); Munisípiu Aileu (Tetun)
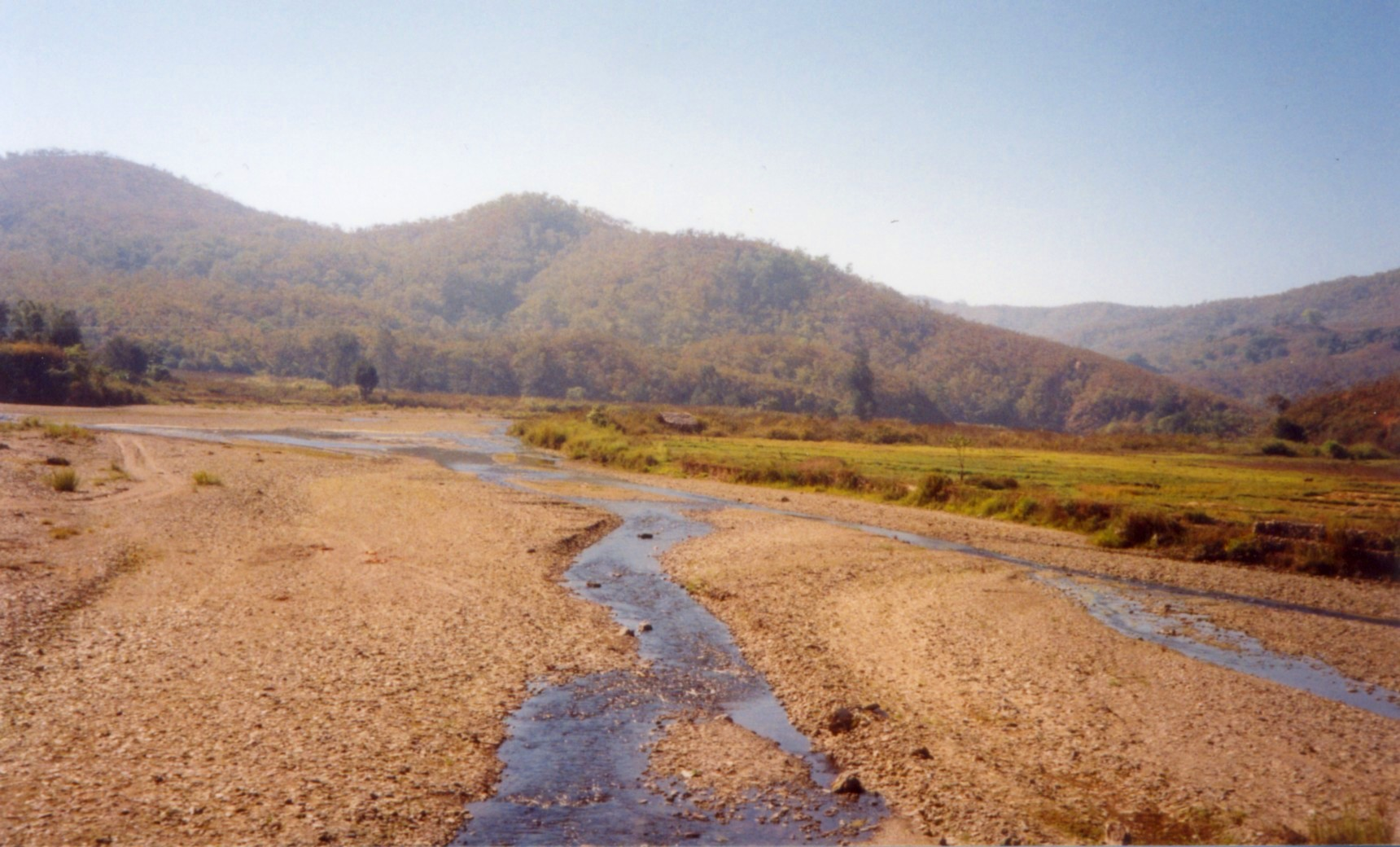
- River in Aileu

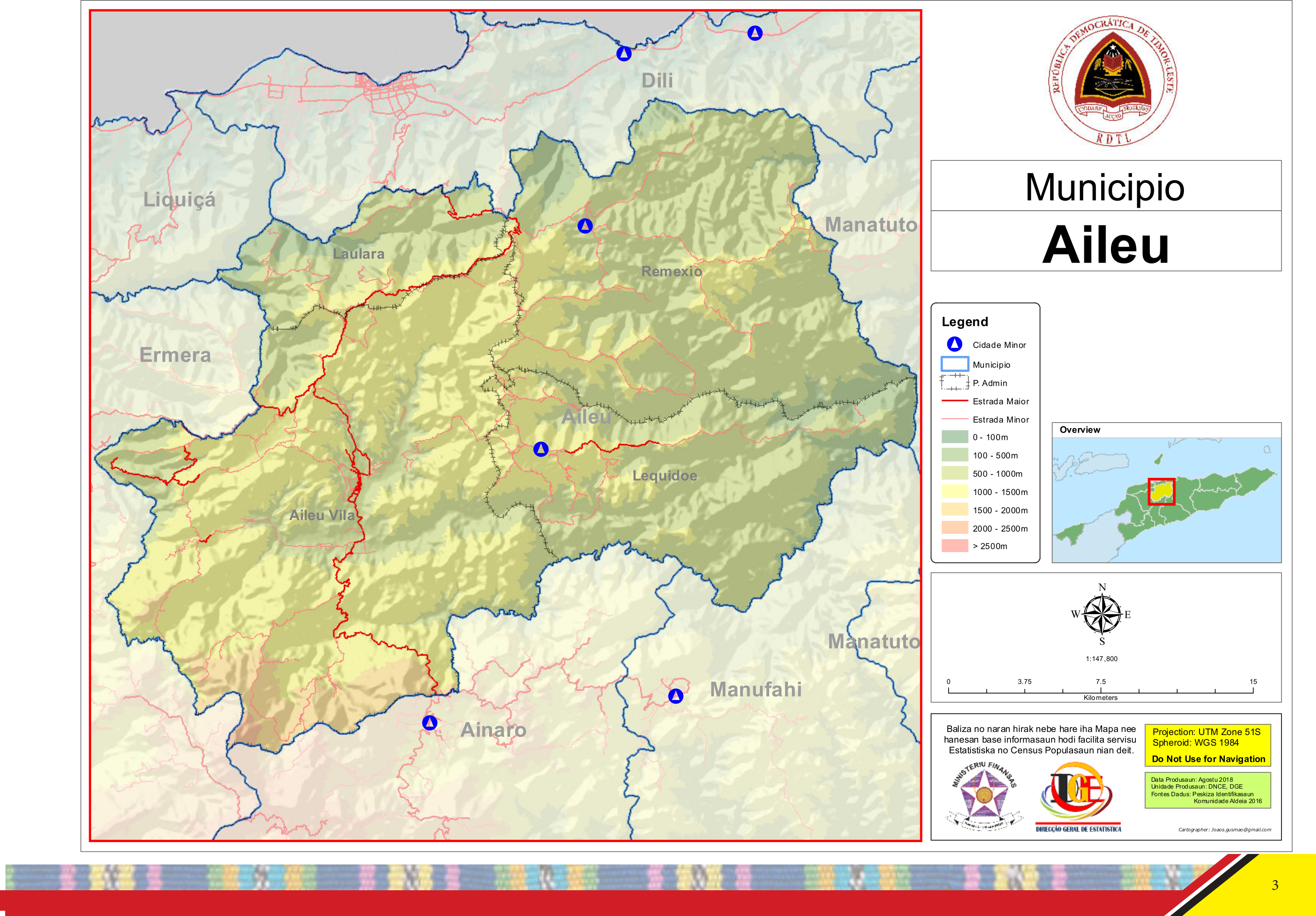
- Official map
- Interactive map of Aileu
- Coordinates: 8°43′S 125°34′E
- Country: Timor-Leste
- Capital: Aileu
- Administrative posts: Aileu; Laulara; Lequidoe; Remexio

Area
  - Total: 735.9 km^{2} (284.1 sq mi)
  - Rank: 9th

Population (2015 census)
  - Total: 48,837
  - Rank: 12th
  - Density: 66.36/km^{2} (171.9/sq mi)
  - Rank: 8th

Households (2015 census)
  - Total: 7,598
  - Rank: 13th
- Time zone: UTC+09:00 (TLT)
- ISO 3166 code: TL-AL
- HDI (2017): 0.613 medium · 6th
- Website: Aileu Municipality

Aileu (Portuguese: Município Aileu, Tetun: Munisípiu Aileu) is a municipality, and was formerly a district, of Timor-Leste. It has a population of 48,554 (Census 2015) and an area of 737 km^{2}. The municipality's capital is also named Aileu. Its administrative posts are Aileu, Laulara, Lequidoe and Remexio.

== Toponymy ==
The word Aileu means "bent tree" in the local Mambai language. According to legend, the root of a banyan fig tree (Ficus benghalensis) grew to maturity without a branch or leaf. The tree developed into a twisted shape that looked like a chair; its unique appearance made it famous, and eventually gave the community its name. Nowadays, the wooden chair is also the symbol of the municipality.

== Geography ==
Aileu is in the northwestern part of Timor-Leste and is one of only two landlocked municipalities, the other being Ermera. It borders Dili to the north, Manatuto to the east, Manufahi to the southeast, Ainaro to the south, Ermera to the west, and Liquiçá to the northwest. It was formerly part of what is now the municipality of Dili but was split in the final years of Portuguese administration.

== Politics ==
As part of the Timor-Leste Government decentralization program the former District of Aileu is now organised as the Municipality of Aileu, headed by a Municipal Administrator. The four former subdistricts are now organised as Administrative Posts.

== Administrative posts ==
The municipality's administrative posts (formerly sub-districts) are:

- Aileu Vila (place of capital)
- Laulara
- Lequido
- Remexio

== Development ==
Aileu is the focus of several development programmes from NGOs, including WaterAid, World Vision and Plan International. In May 2000 the Hume City Council and Moreland City Council and the communities in Melbourne Australia, established a friendship relationship with the Aileu Municipality, called "Friends of Aileu". The friendship relationship has been renewed periodically, with the signing of updated Friendship Agreements in 2005, 2010 and 2016. and
