= Seiçal River =

River in Timor-Leste

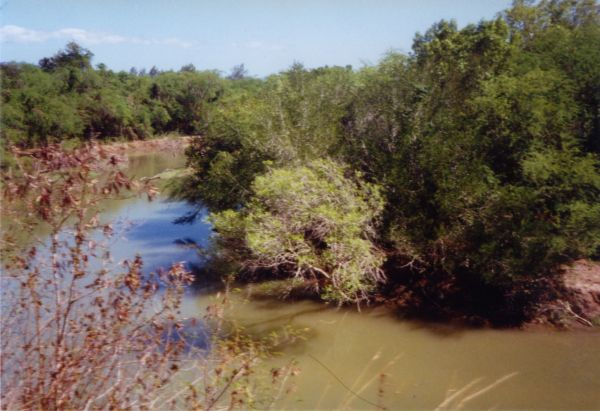
- The river flowing through Suco Seiçal

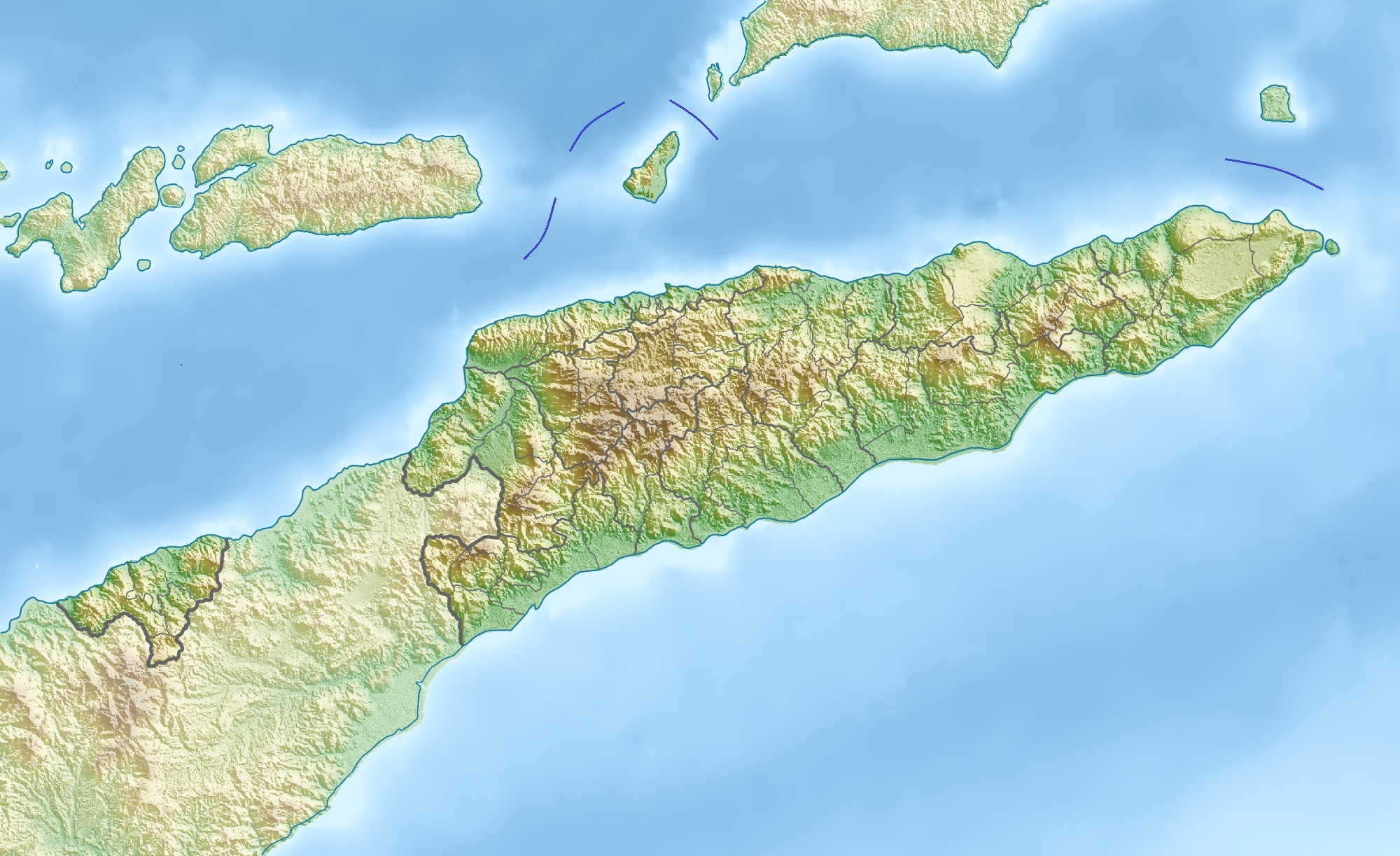
- Location of river mouth
- Native name: Ribeira de Seiçal /; Rio Seiçal (Portuguese); Mota Seiçal (Tetum)

Location
- Country: Timor-Leste
- Municipalities: Baucau; Viqueque

Physical characteristics
- Source confluence
  - location: Baucau / Viqueque border
  - coordinates: 8°38′53″S 126°27′13″E
- Mouth: Wetar Strait
  - location: Suco Seiçal
  - coordinates: 8°27′58″S 126°31′49″E
- Basin size: ~ 489 km^{2} (189 sq mi)

Basin features
- Tributaries
  - left: Aetalabere / Uroassalae / Sauma Rivers, Cainame River
  - right: Culo River, Acanau / Saluhada Rivers, Leulolo River

The Seiçal River (Portuguese: Ribeira de Seiçal or Rio Seiçal, Tetum: Mota Seiçal) is a major river in northeastern Timor-Leste. It flows for the most part in a northerly direction from headwaters in Timor's central mountains; after running past the eastern edge of the Baucau Plateau, it discharges into Wetar Strait.

== Course ==
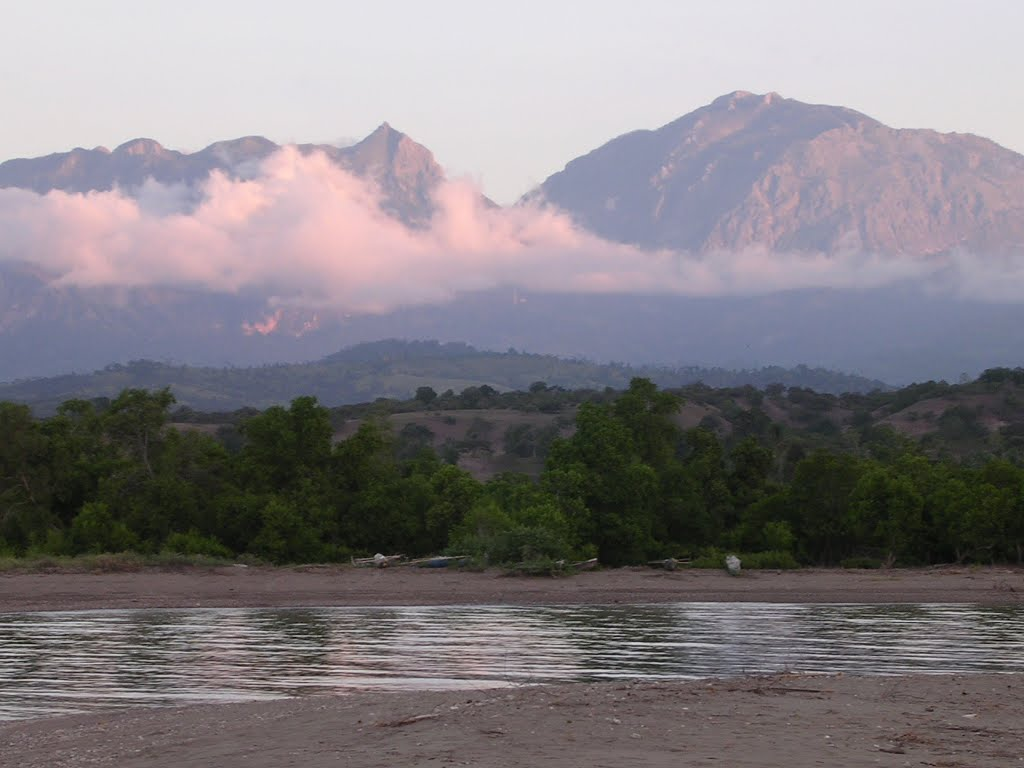
View across the Seiçal River to Mount Matebian

The river rises in Timor's central mountains south of the city of Baucau. Its headwaters are at Mount Mundo Perdido in Ossu administrative post, Viqueque municipality. From there, the river's upper tributaries flow generally northwards, along the border between Viqueque and Baucau municipalities.

The river itself begins at the confluence of the Sauma and Culo Rivers; at first, it similarly flows northwards along the intermunicipal border. Other tributaries rise in some of the south central sucos of Baucau municipality.

At the point where the Saluhada River enters the Seiçal River, still on the border between the two municipalities, the latter river's main channel flows into Baucau municipality, through which it proceeds generally northeastwards, until it discharges into Wetar Strait northeast of Baucau city.

The river is one of Timor-Leste's few perennial streams, and the only one in its immediate vicinity. It is also one of only three such watercourses in the north of the country that can potentially be inhabited by saltwater crocodiles all year round (the others being the Loes and the North Laclo).

The main channel's riverbed is filled with rubble. Its highly unstable floodplain is the most significant in the area, and extends from the central mountains to the strait. Islets in the river are divided by a plethora of braided channels, and adorned with Casuarina. Where the lower reaches of the main channel pass the Baucau Plateau to its west, an escarpment drops down from the plateau to the river's alluvial plain. Near the river mouth, the river is shallow and extremely unstable, and there are many sandbanks, oxbows and scrolls.

In order of entrance, the river's major tributaries include the following:

- Aetalabere River: rises in Suco Uabubo, Ossu administrative post, Viqueque municipality; flows east, and then northeast, to the border between Viqueque and Baucau municipalities; from there, it continues northeast, along that border, until it merges with the Uroassalae River (see below) to form the Sauma River (see below);
- Uroassalae River: rises in Suco Uaibobo, Ossu, Viqueque; flows north, through a gorge it has cut between Mount Venilale and Mount Laritame, to the border between Viqueque and Baucau municipalities, where it merges with the Aetalabere River (see above) to form the Sauma River (see below);
- Sauma River: flows from the confluence of the Aetalabere and Uroassalae Rivers (see above) generally northwards, along the border between Viqueque and Baucau municipalities, until it merges with the Culo River (see below) to form the Seiçal River;
- Culo River: rises in the north of Suco Uaibobo, Ossu, Viqueque, and flows generally northwest to the border between Viqueque and Baucau municipalities, where it merges with the Sauma River (see above) to form the Seiçal River;
- Saluhada River: rises as the Acanau River in the southwest of Quelicai administrative post, Baucau municipality; flows generally westwards, changing its name to Saluhada River on its way to the border between Baucau and Viqueque municipalities, at which point it merges with a tributary, the Cassaquiar River; continues along that border until it enters the Seiçal River at the point where the latter river flows into Baucau municipality;
- Cainame River: rises in the east of Venilale administrative post, Baucau municipality; flows generally eastwards until it enters the Seiçal River a short distance downstream from where the latter river flows into Baucau municipality;
- Leulolo River: rises in Suco Samalari, Baucau administrative post, Baucau municipality; flows generally northwards until it enters the Seiçal River.

== Catchment ==
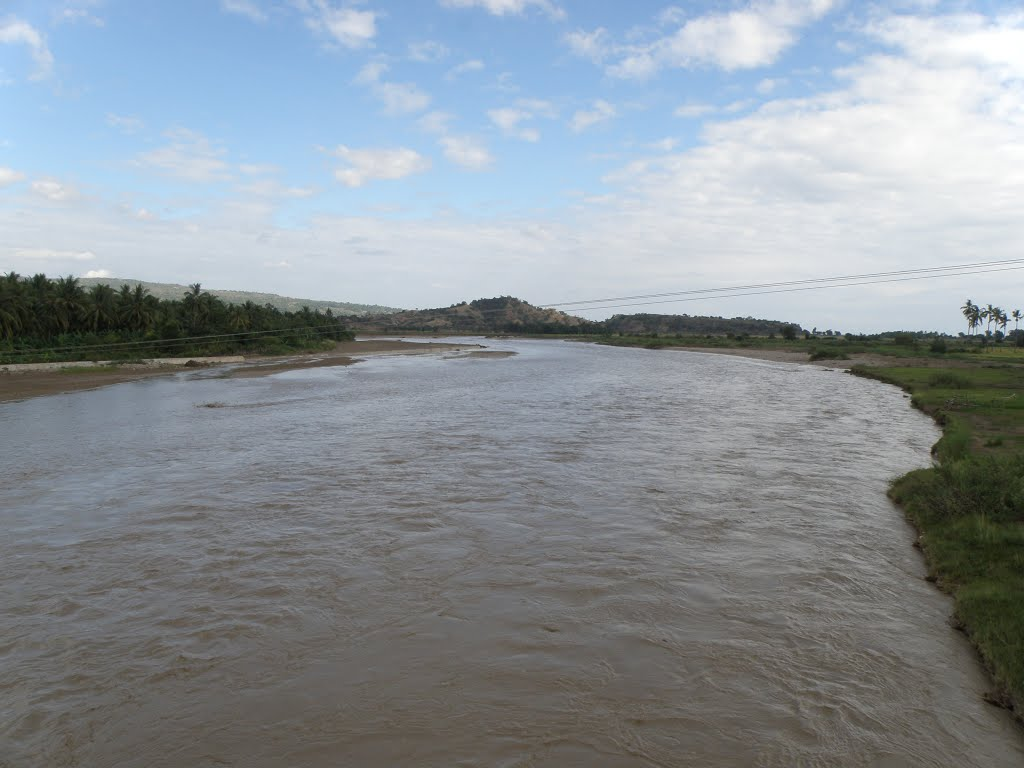
View of the river floodplain during a mid-dry season flood in a La Niña year

The river's catchment or drainage basin is one of Timor-Leste's 10 major catchments, and is approximately 489 km^{2} (189 sq mi) in area.

Timor-Leste has been broadly divided into twelve 'hydrologic units', groupings of climatologically and physiographically similar and adjacent river catchments. The Seiçal River catchment is one of the five major catchments in the Seiçal hydrologic unit, which is about 1,514.8 km^{2} (584.9 sq mi) in total area, and covers 10.2% of the country; the others are the catchments of the Uaimuhi, Laivai, Raumoco and Malailada rivers.

The catchment is made up mostly of Bobonaro Scaly Clay, deeply dissected by rivers and rivulets. Areas of scaly clay can generally be easily identified by the scattered Casuarina junghuhniana trees growing within them. Watercourses passing over the scaly clay have caused severe erosion, gullying, landsliding and slumping, and typically flow through V-shaped valleys and rapids.

In the upper reaches of the catchment, the principal natural form of biosystem is casuarina savanna; in the catchment's floodplain, acacia savanna is the dominant natural landscape. Savanna is by far the most common natural ecosystem type not only in the catchment, but also throughout the Lesser Sunda Islands, of which Timor is a part.

== Economy ==
=== Cultivation ===
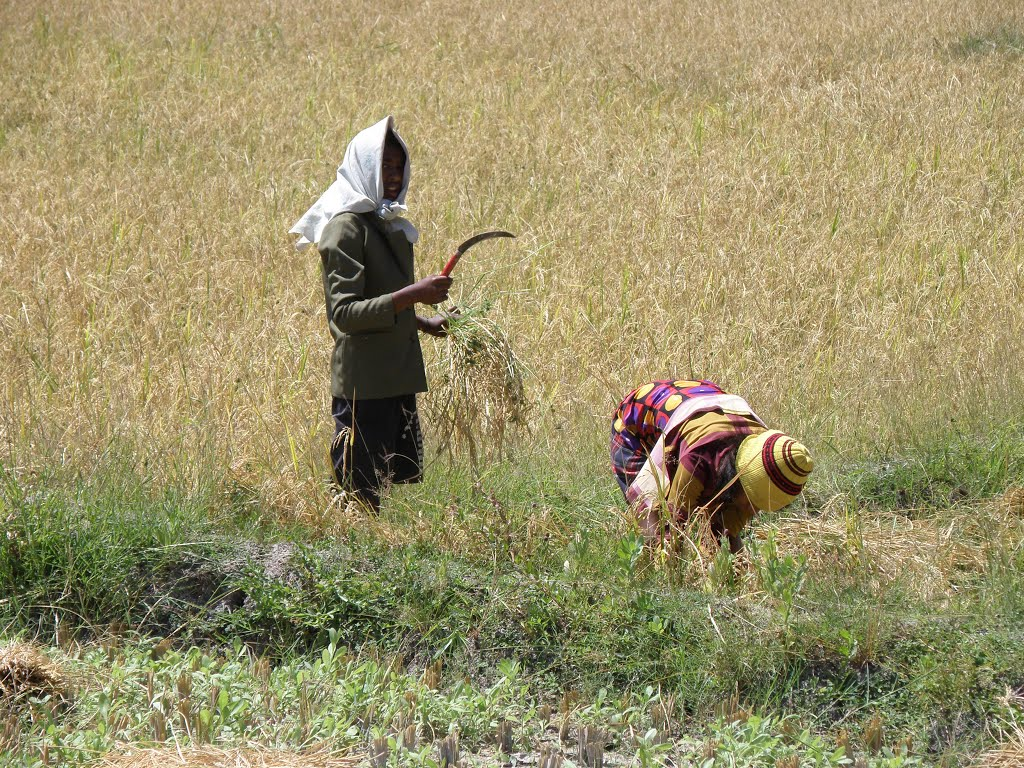
Rice harvesting near the village of Seiçal in the floodplain

The floodplain in the lower reaches of the Seiçal River is near level with a gradient not exceeding 3°. In terms of topography, it is therefore suitable for cultivation, although considerable limitations are imposed by rock outcrops (such as the Baucau Plateau) on its usefulness for that purpose.

Both in the catchment and in Timor more generally, two main types of cultivation have traditionally been practised. The chief type, known locally as lere rai, is a form of land rotation combined with fallow periods. It tends to dominate on steep, sandy or stony fields, in recently deforested areas, and in forested areas where the soil is loose and does not require tillage, which is referred to locally as fila. The other main type of cultivation is fila rai, which as its name suggests involves tillage. Fila rai usually achieves better results, but is feasible only on deep, non-sandy soils. It is also far more labour intensive, with the consequence that Timorese tend to engage in it only when they feel compelled to do so, commonly as a result of population pressure.

The staple crop in the catchment and in Timor is maize, known locally as batar, which is grown in a number of different varieties distinguished by colour. Maize was probably introduced to Timor by the Portuguese, and is easy to grow there; as early as William Dampier's visit to Timor in 1699, it was already the island's number one crop. Other crops grown in the dryland areas of the catchment include tubers such as cassava (Manihot utilissima), yams (eg Dioscorea alata), taro (including Colocasia esculenta), and sweet potatoes (Ipomoea batatas), and also dryland rice. Additionally, residents of the catchment practise house or mixed gardening of a diverse range of flora, including fruit trees, bamboos, banana trees, climbing and winding plants, vegetables, tubers, etc.

Especially, but not only, in the alluvial floodplain of the catchment, there are paddy fields for the cultivation of wet rice. At the mouth of the river, the paddy fields are saline; mud flats north of the Baucau–Lautém road are not cultivated due to the risk of incoming seawater during the northwest monsoon. The catchment is also the site of two irrigation schemes in Baucau municipality, the Seiçal Up and the Seiçal Down. As of 2002, however, the former was non-functional due to major intake damage, and the latter only partially functional because of a blocked main canal.

=== Grazing ===
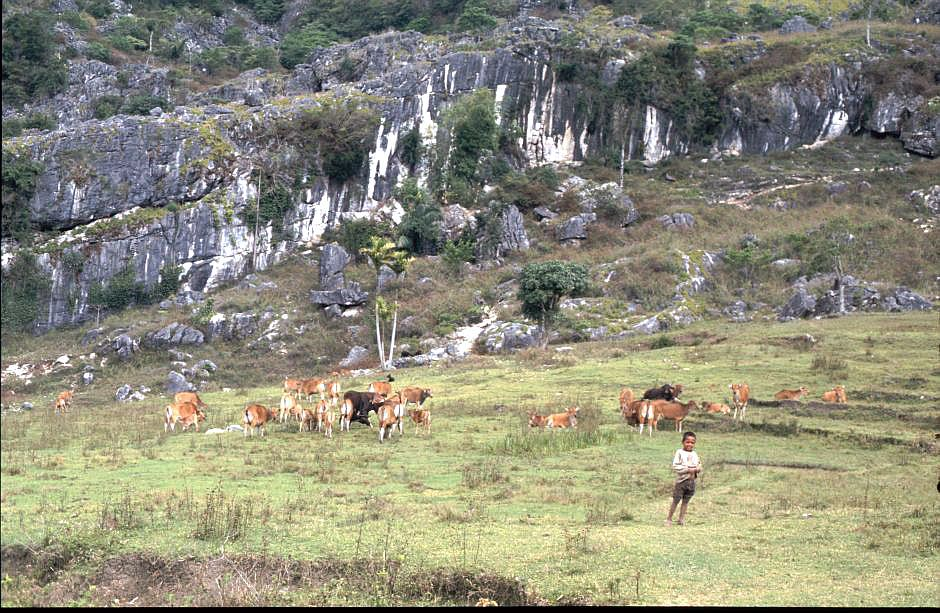
Cattle grazing near Mount Mundo Perdido

Another agricultural activity in the catchment is livestock grazing. Traditionally, most of the grazing is carried out in the form of relatively uncontrolled free ranging, both of large animals such as buffaloes, horses and Bali cattle or smaller livestock including pigs, goats and sheep.

The top ranking livestock are water buffaloes, which in Timor have traditionally been kept predominantly for prestige and sacrificial purposes, but are also sometimes been used for ploughing or 'treading' rice paddies. Horses are used as mounts and as pack animals, and similarly sometimes in paddy fields. Cattle were introduced to Timor in the early twentieth century, but a system of raising them on government farms was initiated in Portuguese Timor only in 1956. In contrast with the position in West Timor, the ensuing increase in the cattle population was not accompanied by a corresponding decrease in buffalo numbers; that is partly because In eastern Timor cattle do not perform the same function as buffalo, and require more supervision.

In relation to the grazing of large livestock, a difficulty is presented by the dry season in the catchment, during which grasses are withered and have very low nutritive value, and supplementary feeding of hay and silage is little known. To some extent, this difficulty can be addressed by the raising of cattle instead of buffalo, and by the driving of livestock to the area's perennial streams, including the Seiçal River, or to the mountains. However, transhumance is not widely practised in the catchment.

Of the smaller livestock kept in the catchment and in Timor, pigs are of a social significance second only to that of buffaloes, as they, too, are important for traditional sacrifices and ceremonial feasts. East Timorese pigs are usually black, and smaller than their European counterparts. They are scavengers, and therefore useful for keeping village compounds clean; especially at harvest time, pigs are either tethered or kept in sties. Also sometimes used for sacrificial purposes are goats, and to a lesser extent sheep.

== See also ==
- List of rivers of Timor-Leste
