= Matebian =

Mountain in East Timor

- Matebean
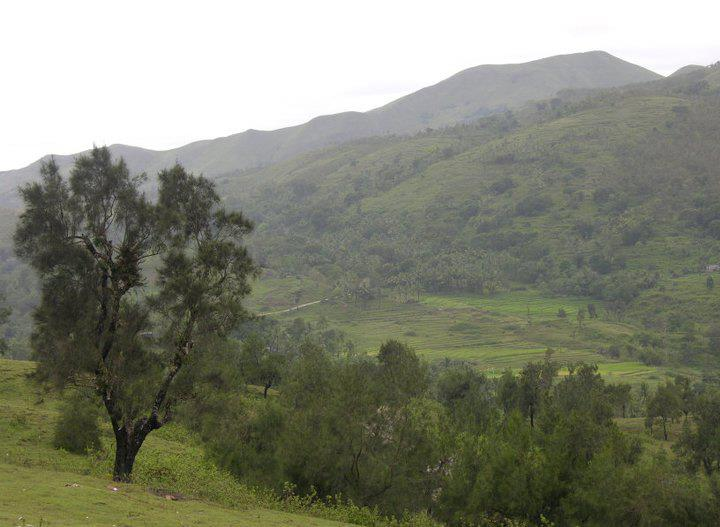

Highest point
- Elevation: 2,372 m (7,782 ft)
- Prominence: 2,045 m (6,709 ft)
- Listing: Ultras; Ribu
- Coordinates: 8°38′26.16″S 126°35′48.84″E

Geography
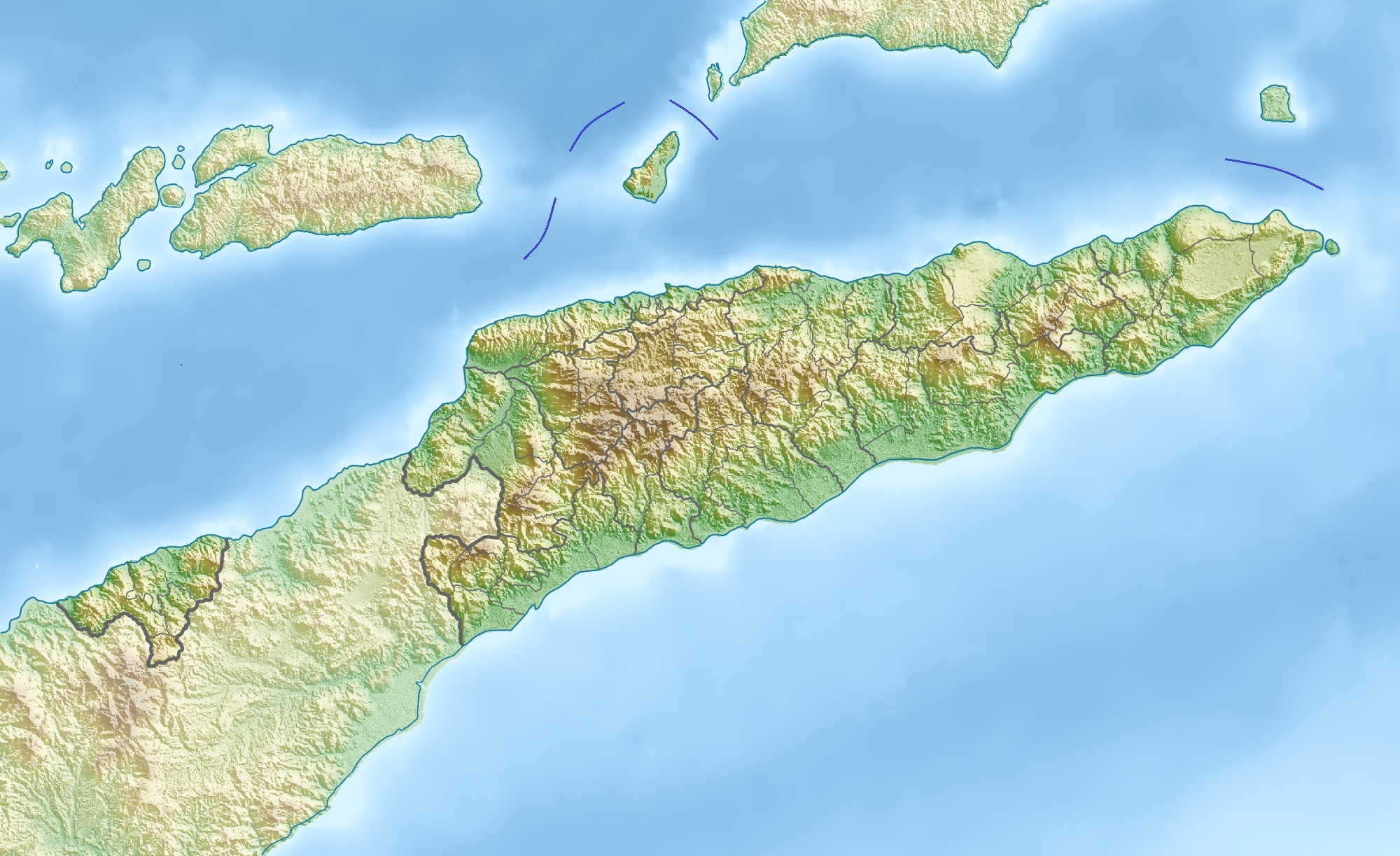
- Location within East Timor
- Location: Baucau District, East Timor

Matebian or Matebean is the third highest mountain in Timor Leste, after Ramelau (Tatamailau).

== Geography ==
The mountain is located in Baucau District. With an elevation of 2,372 metres (7,782 ft) it is among the ultra-prominent peaks of the Malay Archipelago.

At the peak is a statue of Jesus.

== Gallery ==
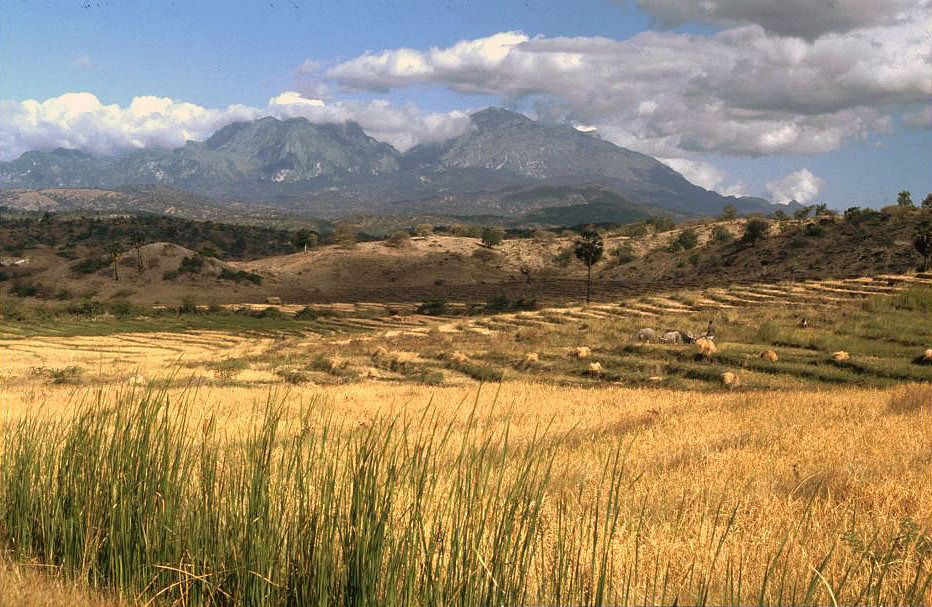
Harvested rice fields of Matebian, Timor-Leste

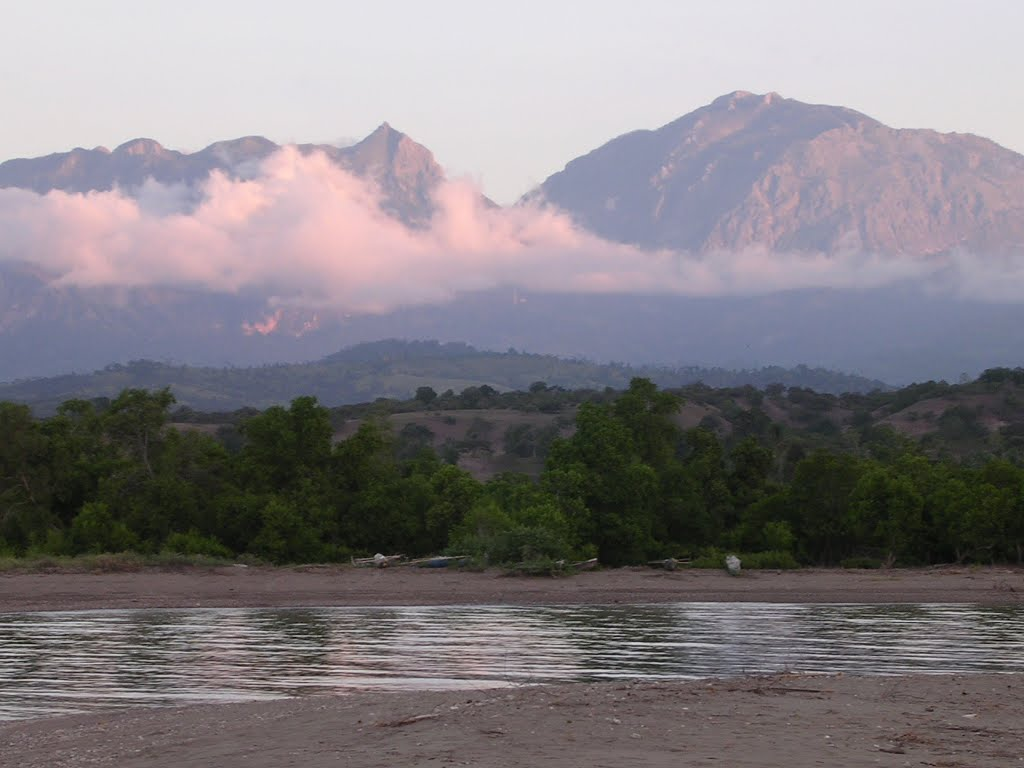
View across the Seiçal River to Matebian Mountain, East Timor

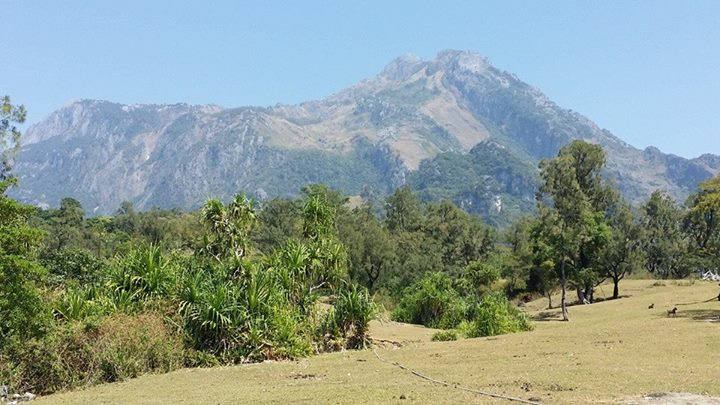
Matebian, East Timor

== See also ==
- List of ultras of the Malay Archipelago
