= Aurora Ximenes =

East Timorese politician

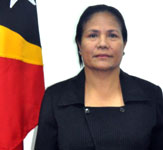
- Aurora Ximenes, 2012
- Born: June 13, 1955 (age 70); Samalari, Baguia, Baucau District, Portuguese Timor
- Occupation: Politician

Aurora Ximenes (born June 13, 1955) is an East Timorese politician. She is a member of the FRETILIN party.

From 1975, the year of the Indonesian invasion of East Timor, Ximenes was a member of the Organização Popular de Mulheres Timorense (Popular Organisation of East Timorese Women) (OPMT), and she engaged in FRETILIN resistance activities for six years following the invasion. She was then arrested and detained for three years. She has been Assistant General Secretary of the OPMT, a member of the central committee of FRETILIN, and the coordinator of the East Timor Women's Network (REDE).

Ximenes was born in Samalari, Baguia, Baucau District, Portuguese Timor. She gained a Bachelor of Arts in public administration, and later worked as a public servant. From at least 2002 until September 2006, she was the district administrator for Liquica.

She was elected to the National Parliament of East Timor on 30 July 2012, and remained a member of parliament until 2017. She was a member of the Commission on Constitutional Affairs, Justice, Public Administration, Local Jurisdiction and Anti-Corruption (Commission A), and secretary of the Timor-Leste Women's Parliamentarian Group (GMPTL).

Since 2018, Ximenes has been a member of the Council of State, which advises the President of East Timor.
