= Olinda Guterres =

East Timor politician

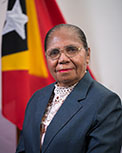

Member of the National Parliament of East Timor
- Incumbent
- Assumed office September 5, 2017

Personal details
- Born: 1955 (age 70–71) Uato-Missa, East Timor
- Party: KHUNTO

Olinda Guterres (born 1955) is a politician in East Timor. She has been a member of the National Parliament for the KHUNTO party since 2017.

== Early life and education ==
Olinda Guterres was born in the Baucau Municipality town of Uato-Missa in 1955. She holds a bachelor's degree in Portuguese.

== Political career ==
Guterres first ran for national office in the 2001 East Timorese parliamentary election, as a member of the Christian Democratic Party (PDC), but she was not elected. For several years she disputed leadership of the PDC with António Ximenes da Costa, which culminated in the Supreme Court declaring the Costa-led version of the party the official one in 2005.

She ran again in the 2012 East Timorese parliamentary election, this time as a member of the Kmanek Haburas Unidade Nasional Timor Oan (KHUNTO) party, but the new party did not gain enough votes to enter Parliament. However, her party passed the threshold in 2017, with Guterres becoming a member of the National Parliament of East Timor on September 5, 2017. In early elections in 2018, she was reelected for a term ending in 2023, then reelected again that year for a term ending in 2028. From 2020 to 2023, she served as vice president of the Parliament's Commission D, which deals with the economy and development.

== Positions ==
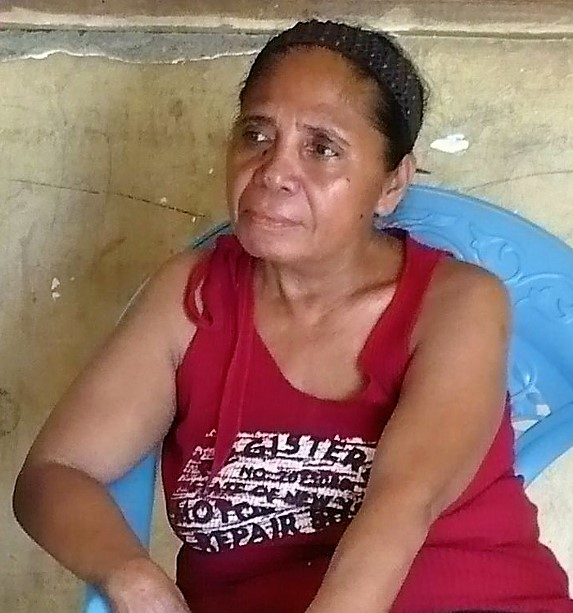
Olinda Guterres at the KHUNTO party office in Dili, East Timor, in June 2012.

=== Portuguese language ===
Guterres has sought to bar the use of Portuguese from parliamentary debates, arguing that it is not widely understood in the country and therefore exclusionary. Banning it would "facilitate members' participation and the general population's comprehension and active involvement in all debates," she said in 2019.

On June 17, 2020, Guterres was involved in a verbal and physical fight on the floor of the National Parliament with fellow legislator Maria Fernanda Lay, a member of the National Congress for Timorese Reconstruction (CNRT) party. Guterres criticized Lay for speaking Portuguese during a debate, rather than Tetum, which is more commonly spoken in the country.

Lay responded that Portuguese is an official language of East Timor according to the Constitution. She also added that Guterres had made racist comments and that she had called her a china pirata ("Chinese pirate"). The argument turned physical, and the two had to be separated by other legislators.

The Lusa News Agency reported that this encounter followed an incident the previous day in which Guterres had to be restrained by fellow legislators in order to prevent her from attacking another CNRT member of parliament, Virgínia Ana Belo.

=== COVID-19 and immigration ===
In January 2021, during the COVID-19 pandemic, Guterres defended security forces "shooting to hurt" (but "not shooting to kill") those seeking to cross the border with Indonesia illegally, "so that they learn."
