= Baucau Airport =

International airport in Baucau, Timor-Leste

Baucau Airport Aeroporto de Baucau (Portuguese)
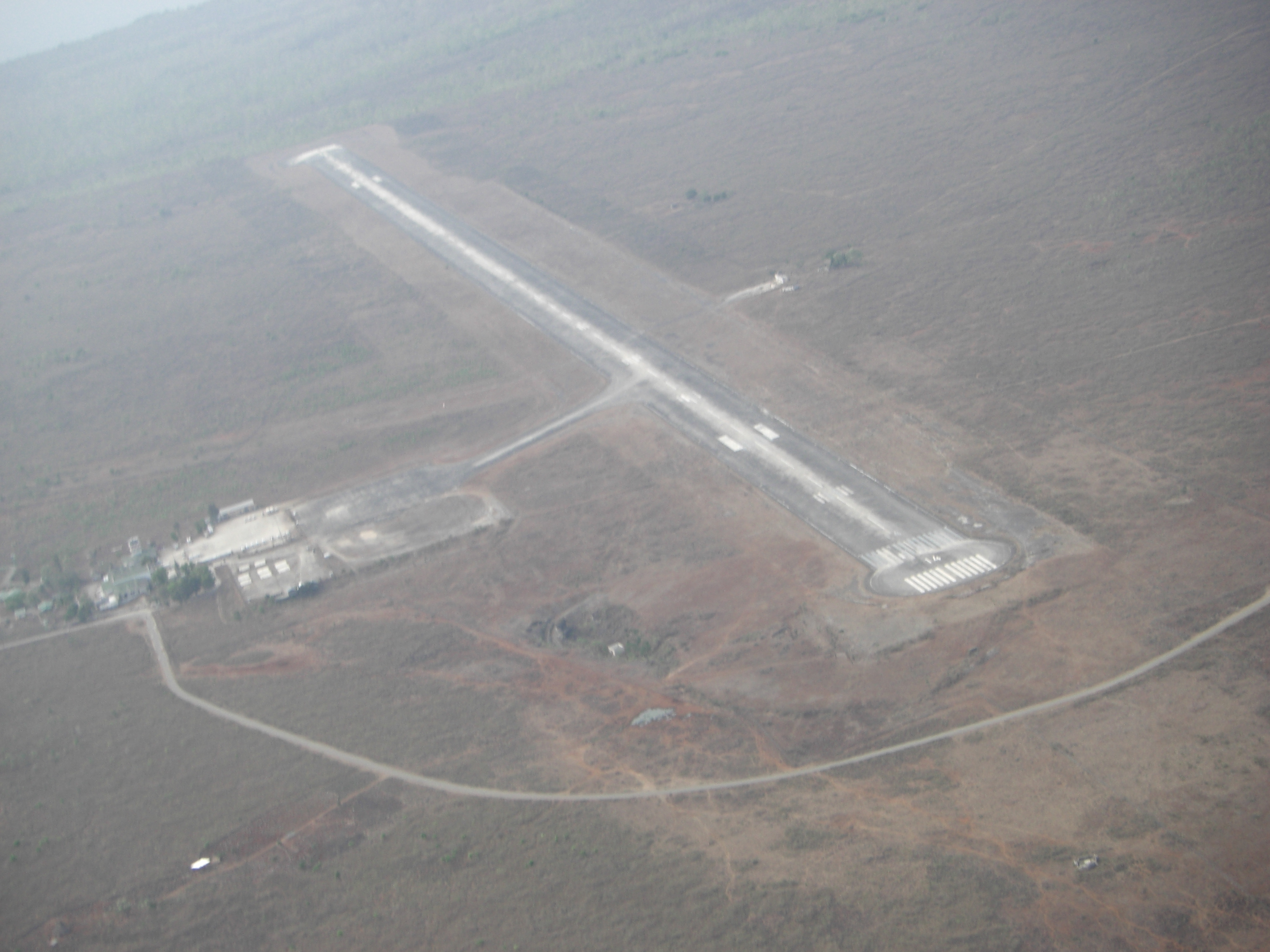
- IATA: BCH; ICAO: WPEC; WMO: 97395

Summary
- Airport type: Military / Public
- Owner/Operator: Government of Timor-Leste
- Serves: Baucau, Timor-Leste
- Location: Bahú, Baucau
- Opened: May 1947
- Time zone: TLT (+09:00)
- Elevation AMSL: 1,777 ft / 542 m
- Coordinates: 08°29′06″S 126°23′56″E

Map
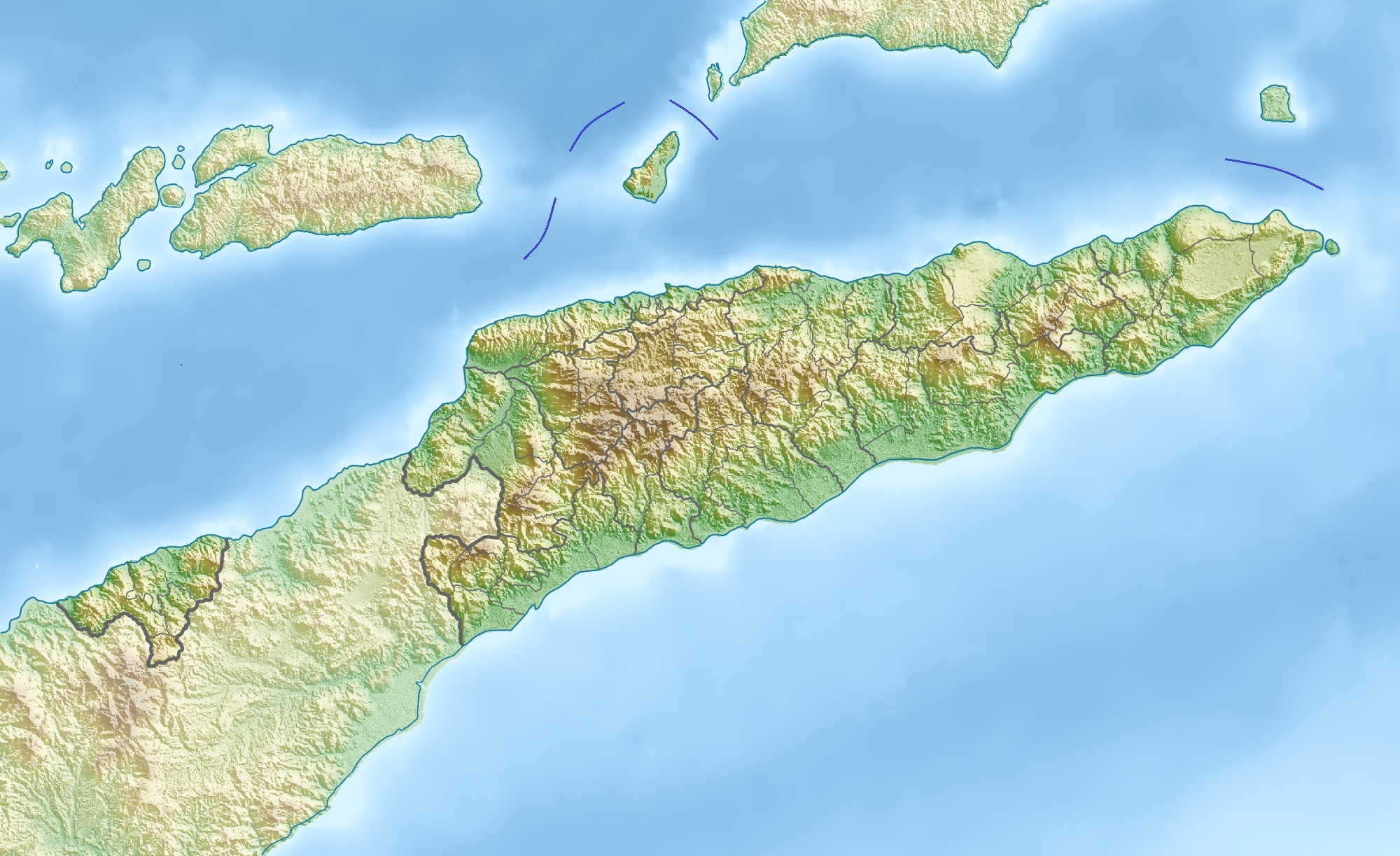
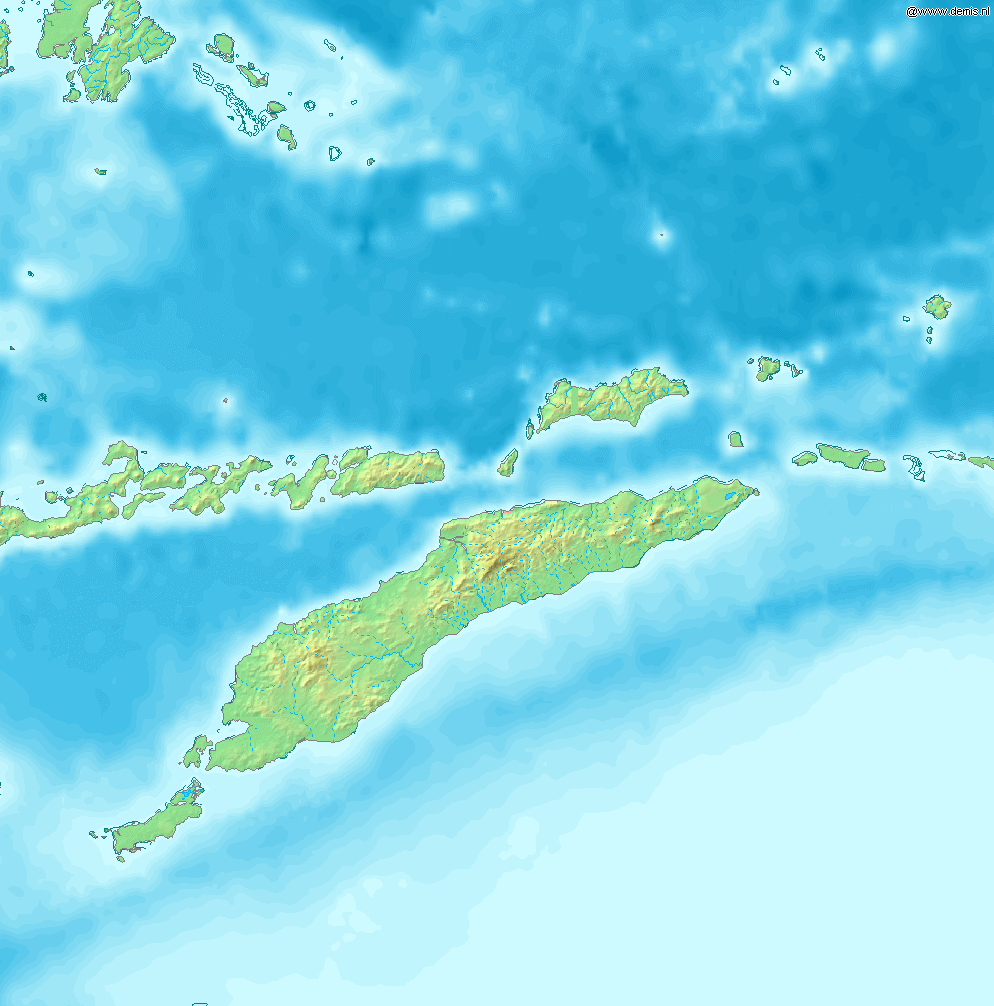
- Location of airport in Timor-Leste Location of airport in Timor

Runways
Direction	Length		Surface
Direction	m	ft	Surface
14/32	2,509	8,233	Asphalt
- Sources: AIP Timor-Leste, DAFIF, WFP

Baucau Airport (Portuguese: Aeroporto de Baucau, Tetum: Aeroportu Baukau, IATA: BCH, ICAO: WPEC), formerly Cakung Airport, is an unattended and mostly unused airport near Baucau, Timor-Leste. It is the largest airport in Timor-Leste and has a much longer runway than Dili's Presidente Nicolau Lobato International Airport, long enough to handle large commercial airliners.

== Location ==
The airport is located on a plateau about 6.5 km (4.0 mi) from the centre of Baucau, and at the western edge of the suco of Bahú, part of the Baucau administrative post. To the north is Wetar Strait, and to the south is a range of mountains. The runway (14/32) runs broadly northwest to southeast.

== History ==
=== 1946–1975 ===
The airport was built by the colonial administration of the then Portuguese Timor in the aftermath of World War II. Construction began in 1946, and for the most part was carried out manually, with thousands of Timorese preparing the runway by hand.

The then Australian consul to the colony, Charles Eaton, who took up his post in January 1946, was a retired officer of the Royal Australian Air Force (RAAF). He had been involved in the RAAF bombing of Timor during the war. While serving as consul, he became an unofficial advisor to the colony on civil aviation matters. Soon after his arrival, the Governor, Óscar Freire de Vasconcelos Ruas, asked him to inspect the proposed site of the airport. On a subsequent visit to Australia, he lobbied the Chief of Air Staff and Director of Aviation of the RAAF to ensure that the airport was equipped with the best available technology.

In May 1947, the airport was opened. The persons invited to the opening ceremony included Resident C.W. Schuller, the head of the colonial administration in Dutch (West) Timor. He noted that Baucau was clearly designed as an international airport and rival to Penfui Airport in Kupang, Dutch Timor, which was then a staging post on flights between Australia and Java, but not yet officially an international facility. In late 1947, Ruas told Schuller that Lockheed Constellation aircraft operating the Darwin–Singapore–Hong Kong route were expected to stop in Baucau from 1 January 1948.

As of March 1948, no such stopovers had occurred, but plans for a Sydney–Darwin–Baucau–Shanghai–Hong Kong route were said by Schuller to be 'getting stronger'. Schuller also noted that local airline Transportes Aéreos de Timor (TAT) was expected soon to start flying Douglas DC-3 or Lockheed Hudson aircraft. However, subsequent reports by Dutch officials in 1948 and 1949 commented that at that time nothing had come of any of these plans.

Eventually, international flights did start serving Baucau Airport. During the rest of the Portuguese colonial era, the airport was the colony's main airfield. As of 1960, TAT was operating international flights between Baucau and Darwin, using small de Havilland airliners: either a Dove or a Heron. On 26 January 1960, the Heron flying one of these services crashed into the Timor Sea. In 1963, work on adapting the runway to make it capable of handling Boeing 707s was completed, although the airport was still not equipped with an instrument landing system.

As of 1964, TAT was using a chartered Trans Australia Airlines (TAA) Fokker F27 Friendship to operate the Baucau to Darwin flights, every week. In 1967, TAT was operating flights between Baucau and Oecusse, and between Baucau and Darwin, using two Doves. As of 1969, TAT was again using a chartered TAA F27 to fly the Baucau to Darwin route.

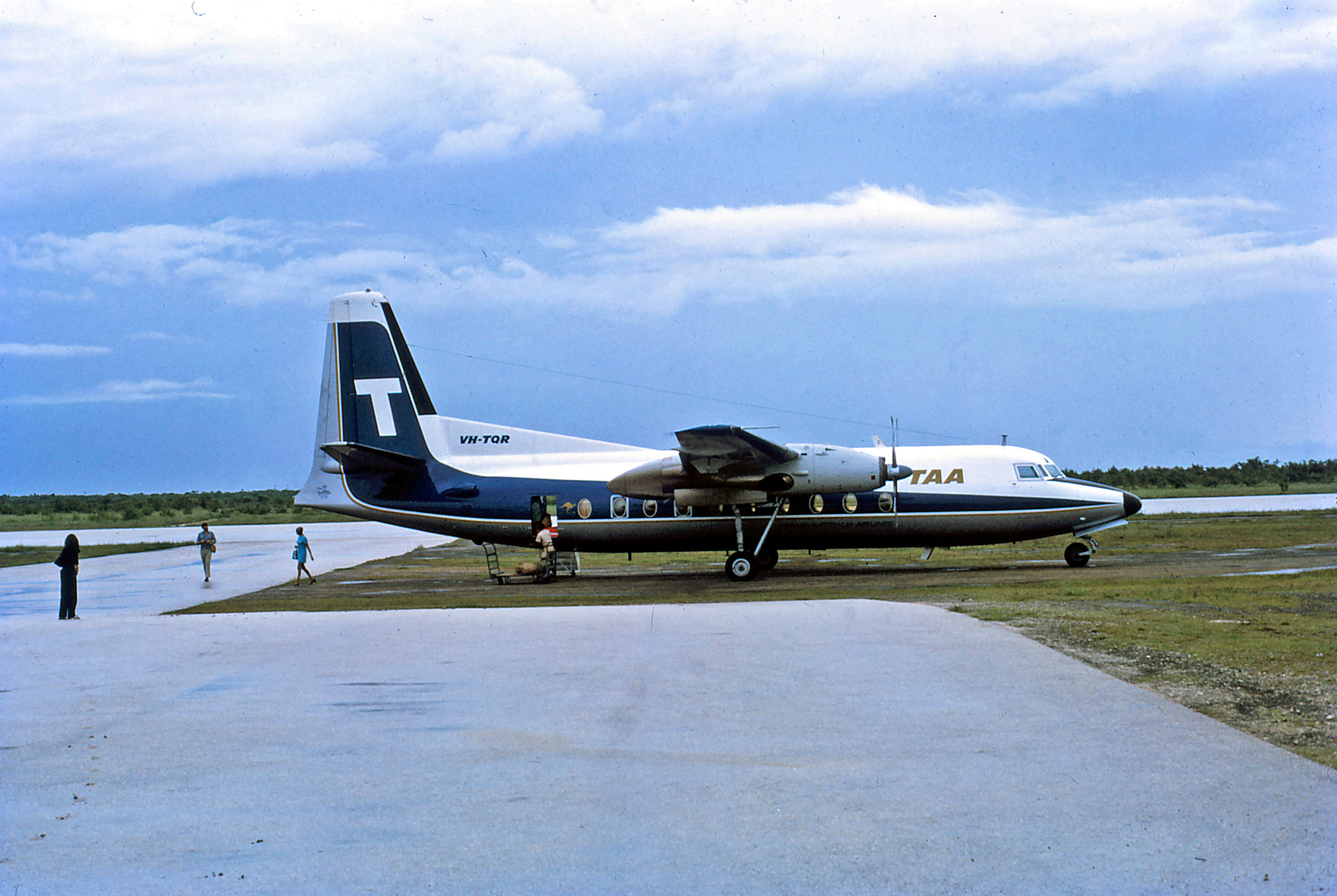
A Trans Australian Airlines Fokker F27 Friendship at the airport in 1971

In the early 1970s, Baucau was the very last stop before Australia on the "hippy trail" from Europe. In 1974 and 1975, there were scheduled TAT domestic services between Baucau and Dili, and the Baucau to Darwin services flown for TAT by TAA had become thrice-weekly. After Cyclone Tracy devastated Darwin at the end of 1974, the flights between Baucau and Darwin were suspended for a time. Due to the political circumstances in Portuguese Timor, the very last such flight was on 7 August 1975.

An F27 was due to land in Baucau from Darwin on 11 August 1975, with Fretilin political party leader José Ramos-Horta aboard. On the evening of 10 August 1975, however, an opposing political party, the Timorese Democratic Union (Portuguese: União Democrática Timorense (UDT)), staged a coup d'état attempt in Dili and seized several strategic locations there, including Dili airport. An Australian TAT pilot, Roger Rudduck, who was involved in the coup, then sent radio messages for the UDT coup organisers from the Dili airport control tower to the Commander of RAAF Base Darwin and the Flight Services Unit at Darwin Airport. The messages advised that there had been a coup in Dili, and that it would be unsafe for the F27 to land in Portuguese Timor. The 11 August 1975 flight therefore never took off, with the intended result that Ramos-Horta was left stranded outside the colony.

As of late August and early September 1975, the airport at Baucau was under the control of the UDT. However, armed skirmishing was underway between the UDT and Fretilin to the west of Baucau.

=== 1975–2000 ===
On 9 December 1975, 156 Indonesian Air Force troops of the Kopasgat infantry and special forces corps, together with other Indonesian troops, parachuted into Baucau as part of the Indonesian invasion of East Timor. The objective of the Kopasgat troops was to capture the airport. The following day, 10 December 1975, Baucau fell to the Indonesians. As a consequence, the airport was taken over by the Indonesian military and closed to civilian traffic, although at least nominally it remained accessible to large civilian airliners such as Airbus A300s, Boeing 747s and McDonnell Douglas DC-10s.

During the ensuing Indonesian occupation, the airport was used by the Indonesian Air Force.

In June 1999, ahead of that year's referendum on East Timorese independence administered by United Nations Mission in East Timor (UNAMET), the United States undertook assessments of the airport to determine whether it could handle Lockheed C-141 and Boeing C-17 operations. After the result of the referendum was announced on 4 September 1999, violent clashes, instigated by a suspected anti-independence militia, sparked a humanitarian and security crisis in the region. On 6 September 1999, at the request of the UN and in coordination with Indonesian officials, the Australian Defence Force executed Operation Spitfire, under which RAAF C-130 Hercules aircraft were used to evacuate UNAMET staff, foreign nationals and refugees from the Baucau and Dili airfields to Darwin, Australia.

Subsequently, the International Force East Timor (INTERFET), a multinational non-United Nations peacemaking task force, was organised to address the humanitarian and security crisis. On 22 September 1999, INTERFET secured Baucau Airport. An airbridge was then created there to support a major expansion of an airbridge INTERFET that had already established between Darwin and Dili. No. 382 Expeditionary Combat Support Squadron RAAF assumed responsibility for the operation of the airport, and No. 2 Airfield Defence Squadron RAAF provided security.

On 18 November 1999, an Air Macau Airbus A320 became the first Portuguese aircraft to visit East Timor for 24 years, when it landed at Baucau with 67 Timorese refugees and direct humanitarian aid to the National Council of Timorese Resistance (Portuguese: Conselho Nacional de Resistência Timorense (CNRT)). Coincidentally, the Airbus's arrival took place on the 65th anniversary of the first ever arrival of a Portuguese aircraft in the then Portuguese Timor: on 18 November 1934, a de Havilland DH.85 Leopard Moth crewed by pilot Humberto da Cruz and mechanic António Lobato landed at the original Dili airport, now part of the site of East Timor's Nicolau Lobato Presidential Palace, at the end of a 14-day long flight from Amadora, near Lisbon.

=== 2000–present ===
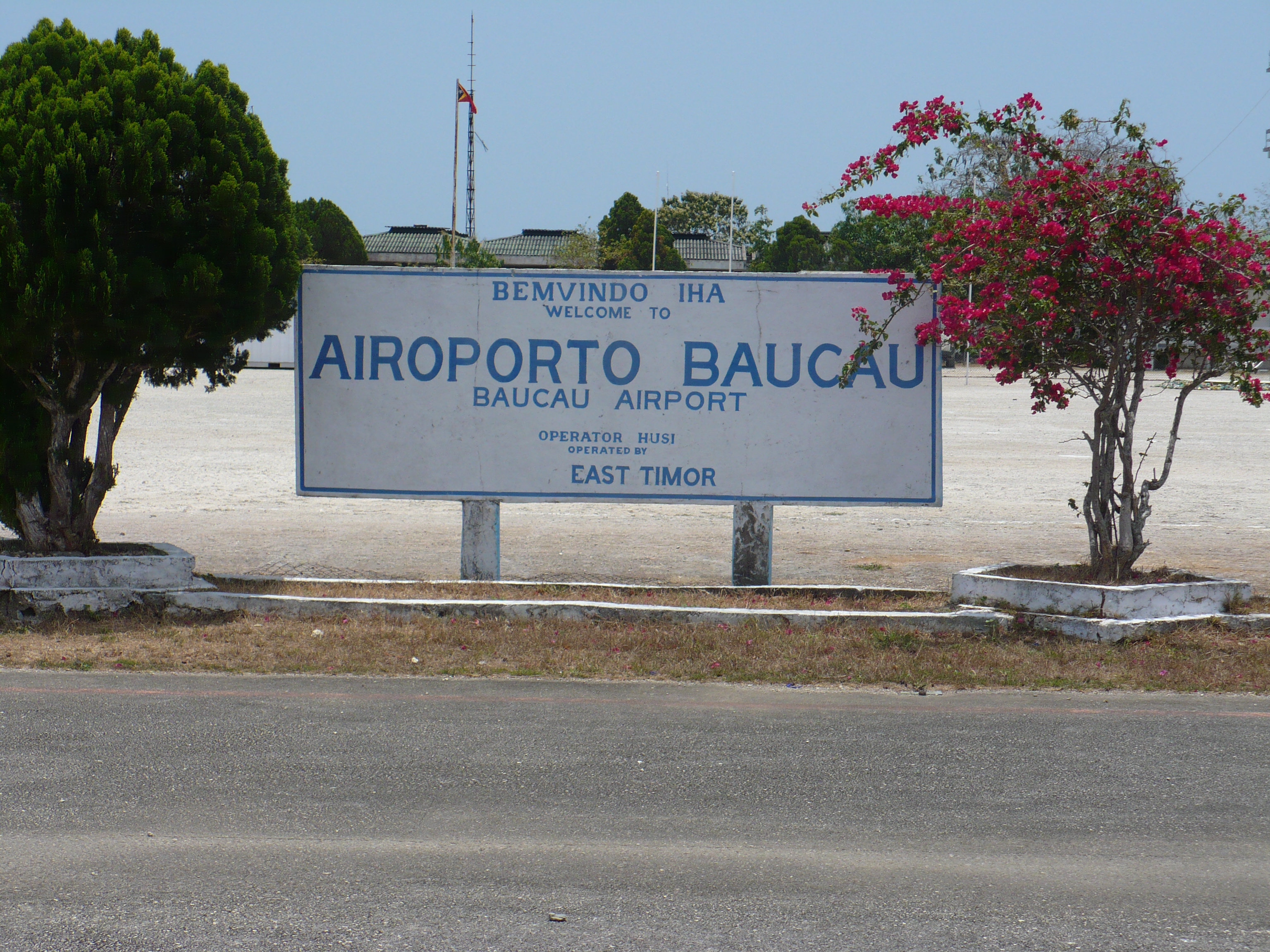
Sign posted outside the parking ramp at the airport in October 2009

From 28 February 2000, when INTERFET handed over command of military operations to United Nations Transitional Administration in East Timor (UNTAET), until 2012, the airport was a key logistics hub for various UN missions based in East Timor.

Soon after the handover, UNTAET reported that "[t]he airports in Dili and Baucau have suffered damages owing to inadequate maintenance, destruction, theft of equipment, and heavy use over recent months". The Tibar Conference, held in May 2000 to analyse East Timor's prospects, identified Dili Airport as an immediate priority, and Baucau Airport as a future priority, due to its long−term potential for tourism and freight transport.

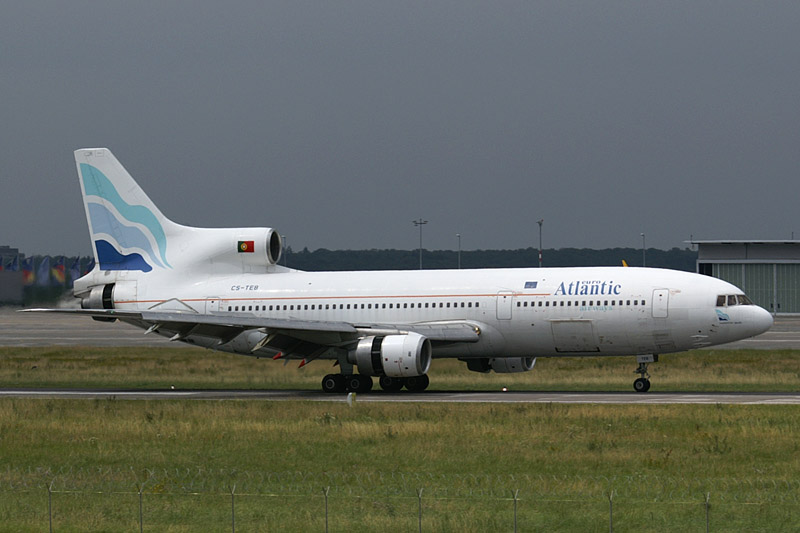
The EuroAtlantic Airways Lockheed L-1011 TriStar

In 2006, the government of Portugal chartered a Lockheed L-1011 TriStar operated by EuroAtlantic Airways to fly Republican Guards into Baucau Airport at the request of the government of East Timor, to assist in responding to that year's security crisis. The operator temporarily based a crew in Singapore, and flew a total of four flights into Baucau, using an improvised communication system: a combination of the control tower at Dili Airport and two helicopters, an Australian Black Hawk and a United Nations Mi-8. In October 2008, 5th Battalion, Royal Australian Regiment deployed to Timor-Leste, as Timor Leste Battle Group 5 on Operation Astute, the international response to the 2006 security crisis. A key task of the deployment was to protect Baucau Airport, and the battalion set up a forward operating base there. In June 2009, the battalion returned to Australia after handing over to 2nd Battalion, Royal Australian Regiment.

Since the last UN peacekeeping mission ended in 2012, the airport has been mostly unused. As of 2017, the runway pavement was not being properly maintained, and could not support jet flights.

In 2018, following discussions at a Bilateral Defense Dialogue, the government of Timor-Lestep asked the government of United States to assist with the rehabilitation of the airport. The request was approved at a meeting of the United States Indo-Pacific Command in Hawaii, but certain critics of the proposed project suggested that it was an attempt by the United States to set up a military base in Baucau.

In March 2021, when the newly appointed United States Ambassador to Timor-Leste, C. Kevin Blackstone, presented his credentials to the Prime Minister of Timor-Leste, Taur Matan Ruak, he said that he intended quickly to complete the procedures necessary for the rehabilitation to go ahead. On 28 June 2021, he and José Maria dos Reis, Deputy Prime Minister and Minister of Planning and Territory of East Timor, signed two Memoranda of Understanding for bilateral cooperation. One was for the rehabilitation of the airport, and the other was for potential U.S. support for the development of Timor-Leste's civil aviation sector. According to the official US Government announcement of the signing:

"The project ... allocates an initial $10.6 million intended to enhance Timor-Leste’s capacity in the areas of security, humanitarian assistance, and disaster response operations to contribute to the development of a resilient and diversified economy. This includes support for the development of the F-FDTL’s Air Component and small-scale construction to improve security and storage capabilities at Baucau Airfield. The project includes the donation of an American-made Cessna 206 aircraft, the installation of a security fence, the construction of an equipment storage warehouse, and high-quality American equipment including a fuel truck, fire truck, forklift, two Ford F-350 utility trucks, a runway sweeper, and other support vehicles and airport security equipment. The aircraft will come with high-tech cameras the F-FDTL can use to monitor Timor-Leste's territorial waters as well as respond to natural disasters."

On 12 July 2021, at a ceremony at the airport, the Prime Minister and the Ambassador laid the foundation stone for the rehabilitation project. In his speech at the ceremony, the Prime Minister observed that the discussions about the project had begun in 2008, when he was still a General in the Timor Leste Defence Force (F-FDTL). He explained that the rehabilitated airport would be used by the F-FDTL Air Component, and, in the future, as a multi-purpose airport, for large aircraft that cannot land at Dili Airport. He also denied that the United States was going to build a military base there; he said that East Timor did not need Baucau to be a military base, and that the United States, as the world's leading military power, did not need Baucau as a military base.

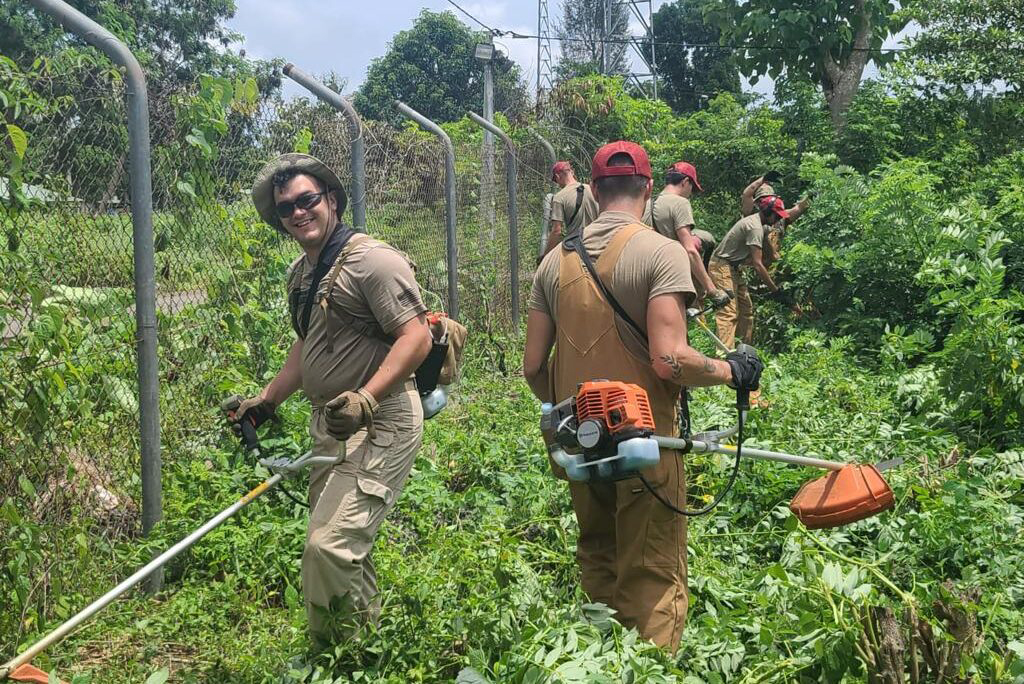
U.S. and Timorese military engineers begin joint rehabilitation of the airport in January 2022

Soon afterwards, the rehabilitation project was the subject of a lengthy analysis by Fundasaun Mahein, an East Timorese think tank specialising in security sector monitoring, research and advocacy. Fundasaun Mahein felt that the rehabilitation agreement raised difficult and complex questions about the foreign policy of Timor-Leste:

On one hand, we agree with the concern of civil society groups that we should be very careful about our engagement with big countries in relation to security cooperation. ... However, we also believe that we need to continue with our existing bilateral cooperation programs which have improved our security sector's capacity, while adopting a pragmatic and nuanced foreign policy which avoids "choosing sides" and maintains friendly relations with all countries which are interested to partner with us."

Additionally, Fundasaun Mahein noted that many saw the Baucau region as having significant potential for agriculture, tourism and industrial development. The airport was therefore considered highly strategic not only for both civilian and military use, but also for enabling the socio-economic development of the Baucau region.

The rehabilitation project was scheduled to begin in October 2021, but did not start until January 2022. The delayed perimeter fence repair and warehouse construction tasks were completed in April 2022, and the Cessna 206 was scheduled to arrive later in the year.

== Facilities ==
Immediately before the Indonesian invasion in 1975, the airport had a long concrete runway with modern facilities and a relatively modern control tower. However, it was not fitted with major communications equipment or lighting, and ATC personnel were not stationed on site.

If the airport's facilities were rehabilitated, the airport could service any passenger aircraft.

== Operations ==
As of 2022, the airport was mostly unused. The runway pavement was not being properly maintained, and could not support jet flights. Aero Dili was operating flights from and to Dili using a Cessna 207 piston-engined aircraft. Mission Aviation Fellowship (MAF) Timor-Leste occasionally uses other piston-engined aircraft to operate medevac flights to and from the airport, including for victims of crocodile attacks, which usually take place at the eastern end of the country.

== Accidents and incidents ==
- On 26 January 1960, a TAT de Havilland Heron, registration CR-TAI, crashed north west of Bathurst Island in the Timor Sea, approximately one hour after taking off from Darwin on a flight to Baucau. Two crew members and seven passengers were killed. The passengers included Klaus Thorak, a prominent Northern Territory government veterinarian, his wife and their 15 year old son. It is believed that the pilot had difficulty with poor visibility, for which he had not been trained.
- On 4 September 1975, a group of 44 civilians, including armed supporters of the Timorese Democratic Union (UDT), commandeered a Royal Australian Air Force (RAAF) Caribou aircraft, A4-140, on the ground at Baucau Airport. The Caribou had landed at Baucau on a humanitarian mission for the International Committee of the Red Cross. The civilians demanded that the RAAF crew members fly them to Darwin Airport (also RAAF Base Darwin) in Australia, which they did. After the Caribou arrived there, the Australian government detained the civilians for a short period, and then granted refugee visas to all of them. The Guardian later described A4-140 as "the only RAAF plane ever hijacked", and the incident as "one of the more remarkable stories in Australia's military and immigration history".
- On 14 October 1999, jet wash from a Lockheed L-1011 TriStar powering up to taxi for departure caused a Group Captain of the RAAF to be thrown some 15 m (49 ft) hard against a parked UN vehicle. He suffered broken ribs and vertebrae, and a smashed elbow. As two RAAF medics were assisting him, militia forces lobbed grenades into the airfield encampment, but none of the grenades went off, as the militia had forgotten to install any detonators in them. The Group Captain had to be evacuated to Darwin; he later returned to East Timor on RAAF service.
- On 31 January 2003, a chartered Euro Asia Aviation Ilyushin Il-76TD, registration RDPL-34141, crashed near Caicedo village. It had been attempting a second approach to Baucau Airport, at the end of a flight from Macau carrying 31 t (31 long tons; 34 short tons) of telecommunications equipment for a Portuguese telephone company. The four crew members, and two loadmasters travelling as passengers, were killed. The aircraft had been descending below the published Minimum Descent Height (MDH), and the pilot in command and the copilot were probably each unaware of the high rate of descent.

== See also ==
- Civil Aviation Division of East Timor
