= Laga Administrative Post =

Administrative post in Baucau Municipality, East Timor

Laga
- Administrative Post
- Posto Administrativo de Laga (Portuguese); Postu administrativu Laga (Tetun)
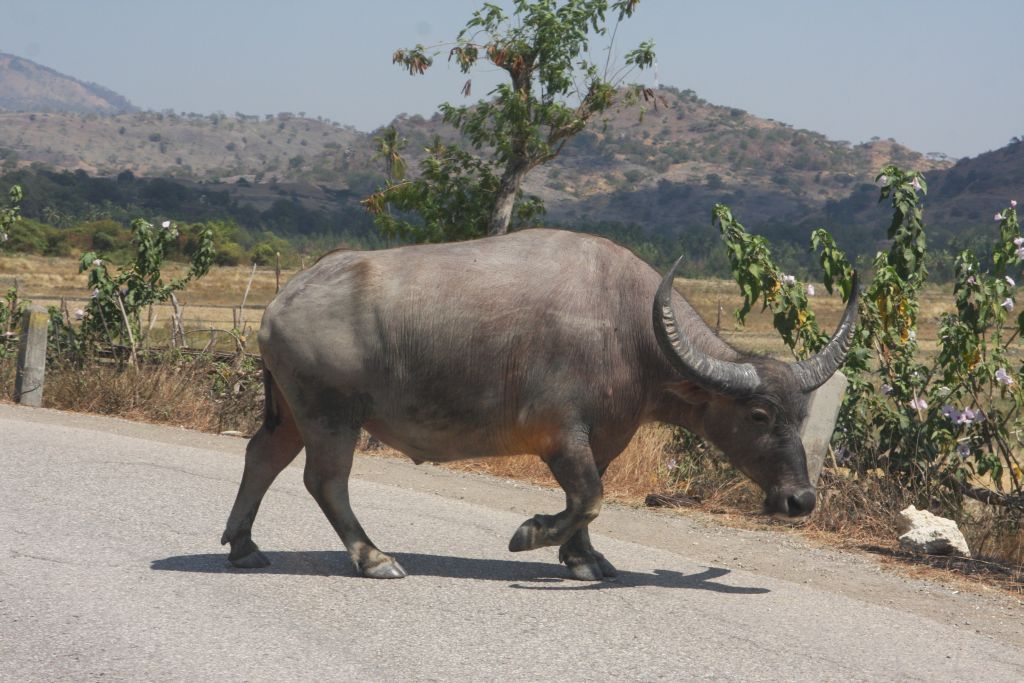
- Buffalo in Laga

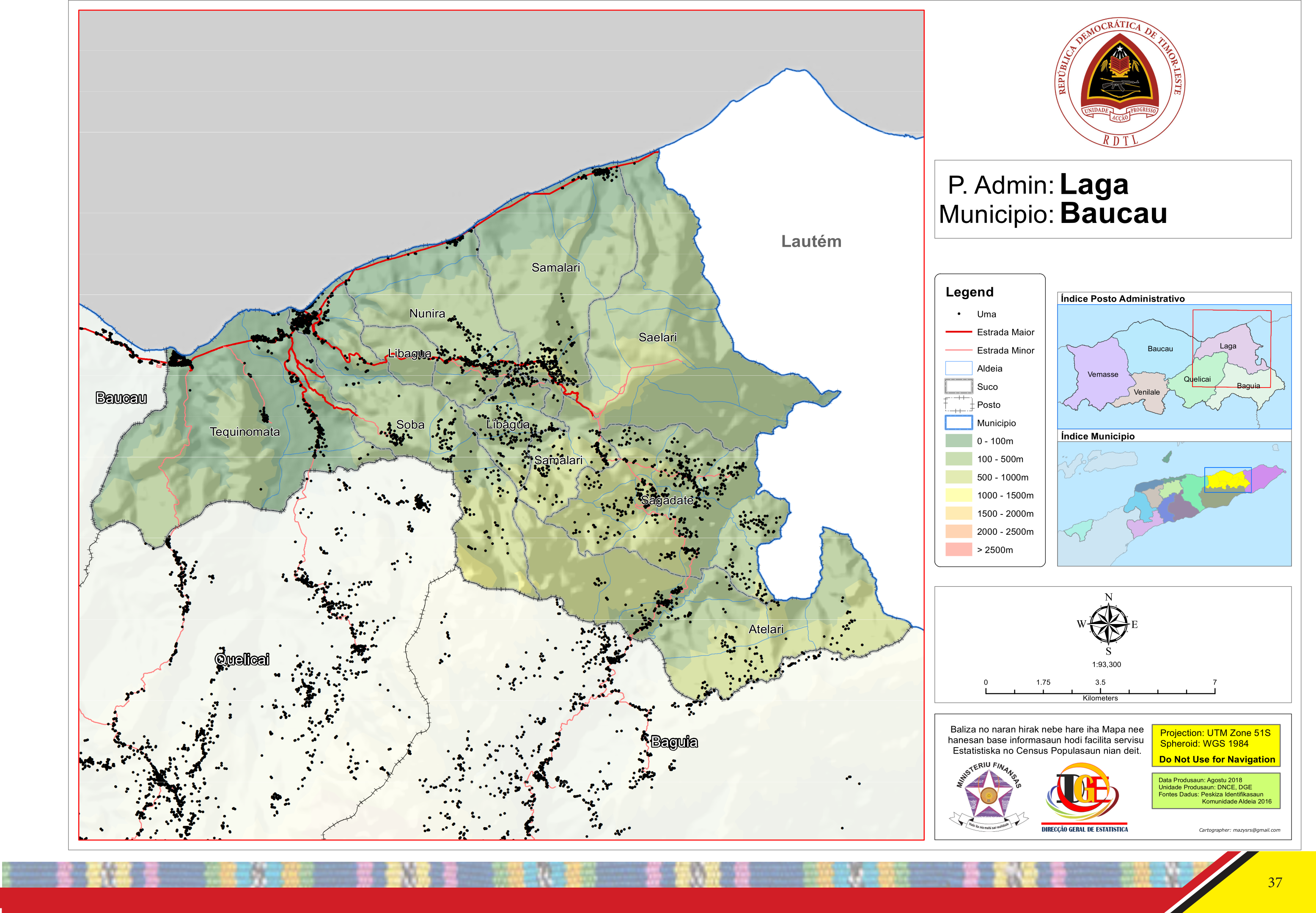
- Official map

- Location within East Timor
- Coordinates: 8°28′S 126°36′E
- Country: Timor-Leste
- Municipality: Baucau
- Seat: Soba
- Sucos: Atelari; Libagua; Nunira; Saelari; Sagadate; Samalari; Soba; Tequinaumata

Area
  - Total: 194.1 km^{2} (74.9 sq mi)

Population (2015 census)
  - Total: 18,359
  - Density: 94.59/km^{2} (245.0/sq mi)

Households (2015 census)
  - Total: 3,530
- Time zone: UTC+09:00 (TLT)

Laga, officially Laga Administrative Post (Portuguese: Posto Administrativo de Laga, Tetun: Postu administrativu Laga), is an administrative post (and was formerly a subdistrict) in Baucau municipality, Timor-Leste. Its seat or administrative centre is Soba. Its population in 2010 was 14,000.
