= Venilale Administrative Post =

Administrative post in Baucau Municipality, East Timor

Venilale
- Administrative Post
- Posto Administrativo de Venilale (Portuguese); Postu administrativu Vinilale (Tetun)
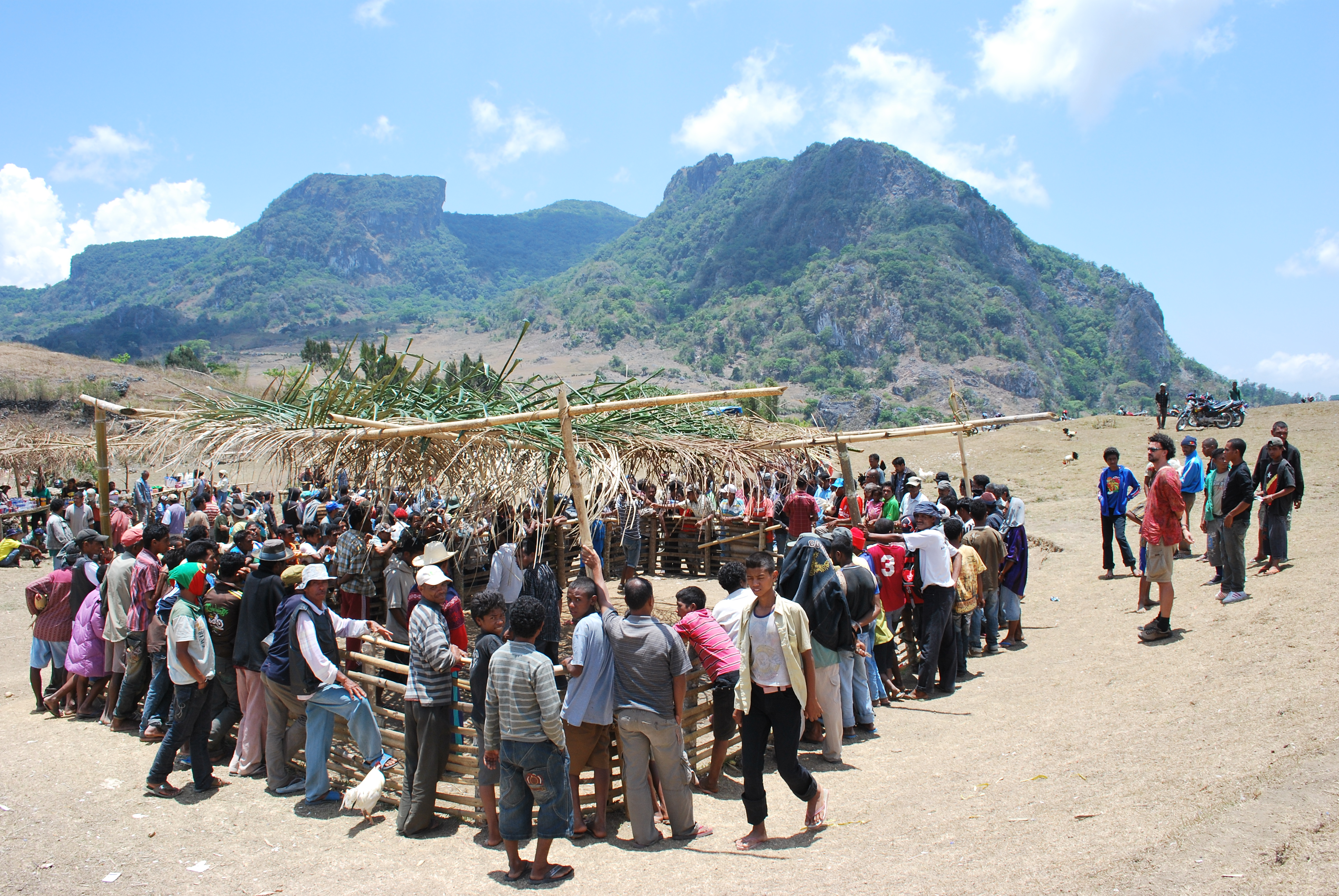
- Cockfight in Venilale

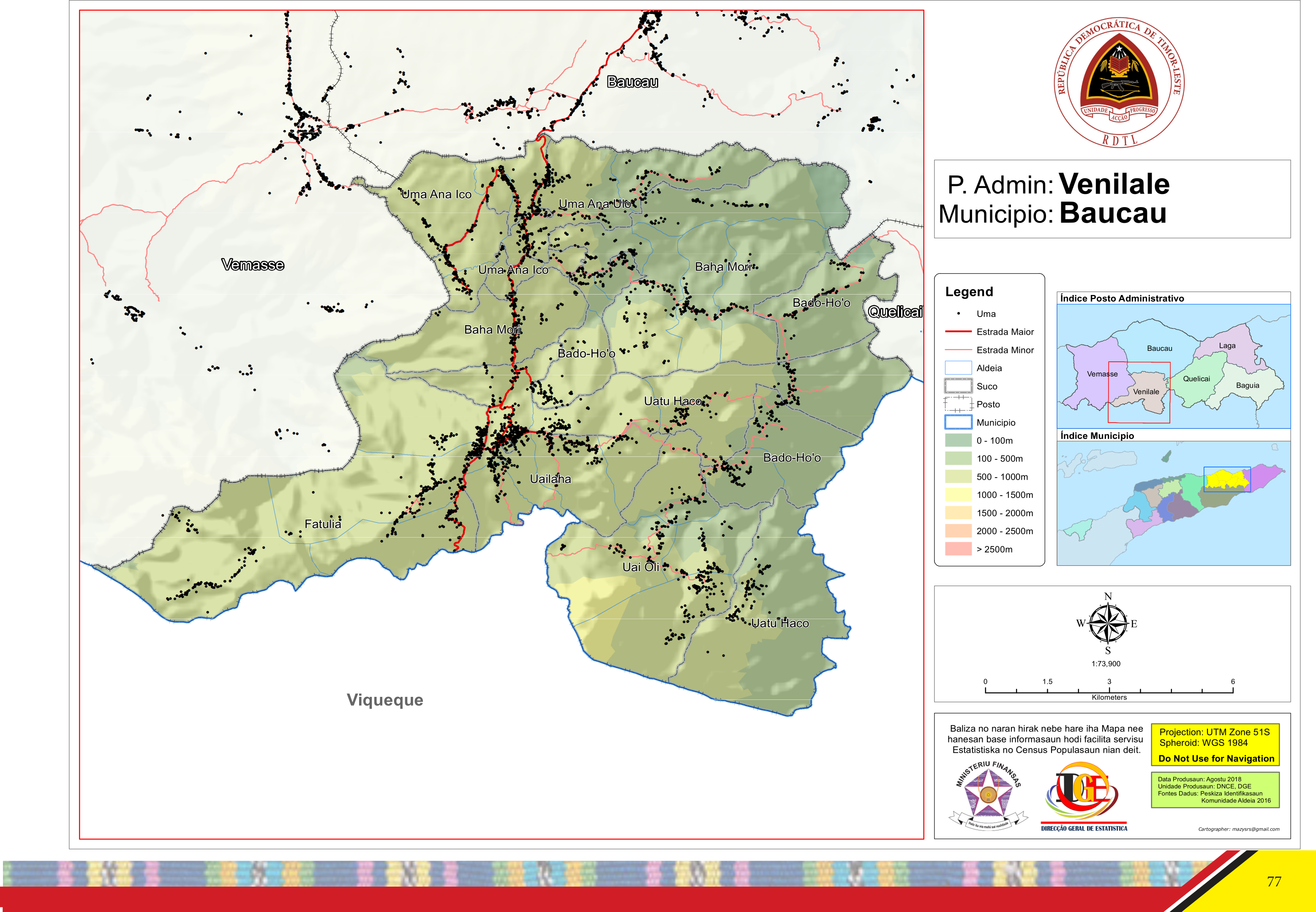
- Official map

- Location within East Timor
- Coordinates: 8°38′34″S 126°22′44″E
- Country: Timor-Leste
- Municipality: Baucau
- Seat: Uatu Haco
- Sucos: Bado-Ho'o; Baha Mori; Fatulia; Uailaha; Uai Oli; Uatu Haco; Uma Ana Ico; Uma Ana Ulo

Area
  - Total: 155.7 km^{2} (60.1 sq mi)

Population (2015 census)
  - Total: 17,495
  - Density: 112.4/km^{2} (291.0/sq mi)

Households (2015 census)
  - Total: 3,121
- Time zone: UTC+09:00 (TLT)

Venilale, officially Venilale Administrative Post (Portuguese: Posto Administrativo de Venilale, Tetun: Postu administrativu Vinilale), is an administrative post (and was formerly a subdistrict) in Baucau municipality, Timor-Leste. Its seat or administrative centre is Uatu Haco.

The administrative post has a population of 17,495 people in 2015 and has an area of 155.70 km. It comprises 8 sucos (villages): Bado-Ho'o, Baha Mori, Fatulia, Uailaha, Uai Oli, Uatu Haco, Uma Ana Ico, Uma Ana Ulo. Local Languages spoken include Midiki, Makasae and Tetum. Portuguese, English and Bahasa Indonesia are spoken by some people in the area.

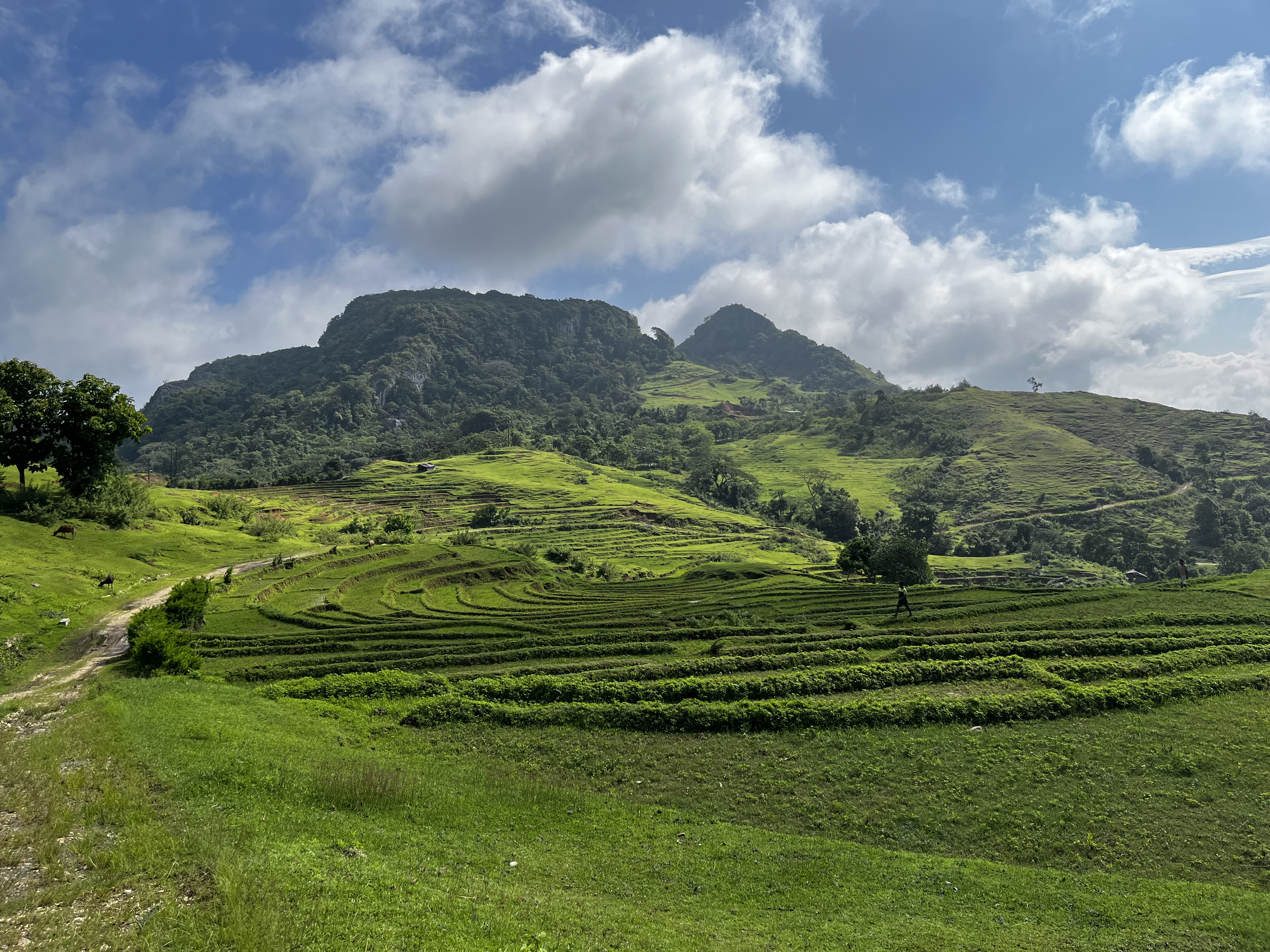
Ariana mountain in Venilale
