= Baucau Municipality =

Municipality of East Timor

Baucau
- Municipality
- Município Baucau (Portuguese); Munisípiu Baukau (Tetun)
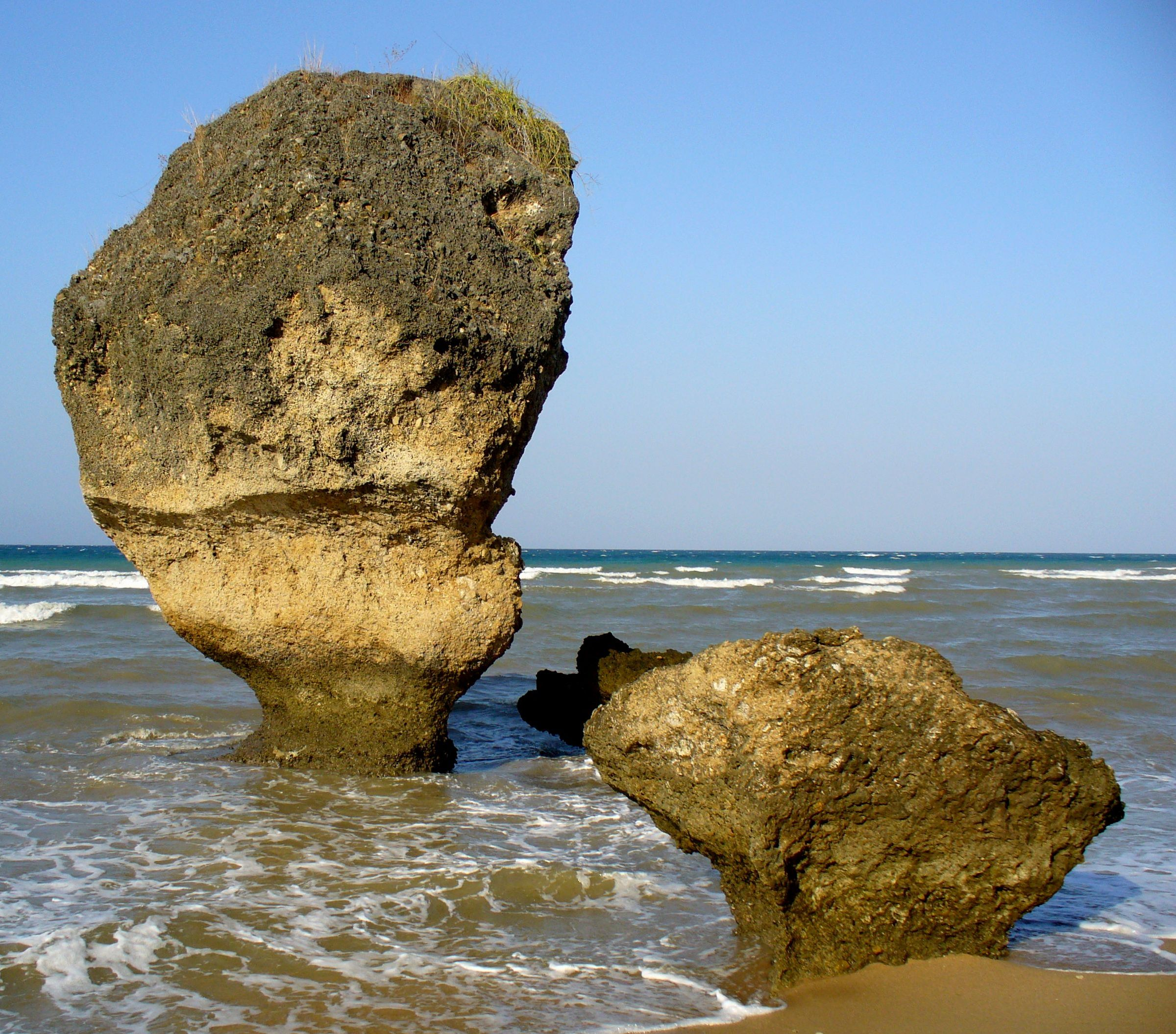
- Osolata beach

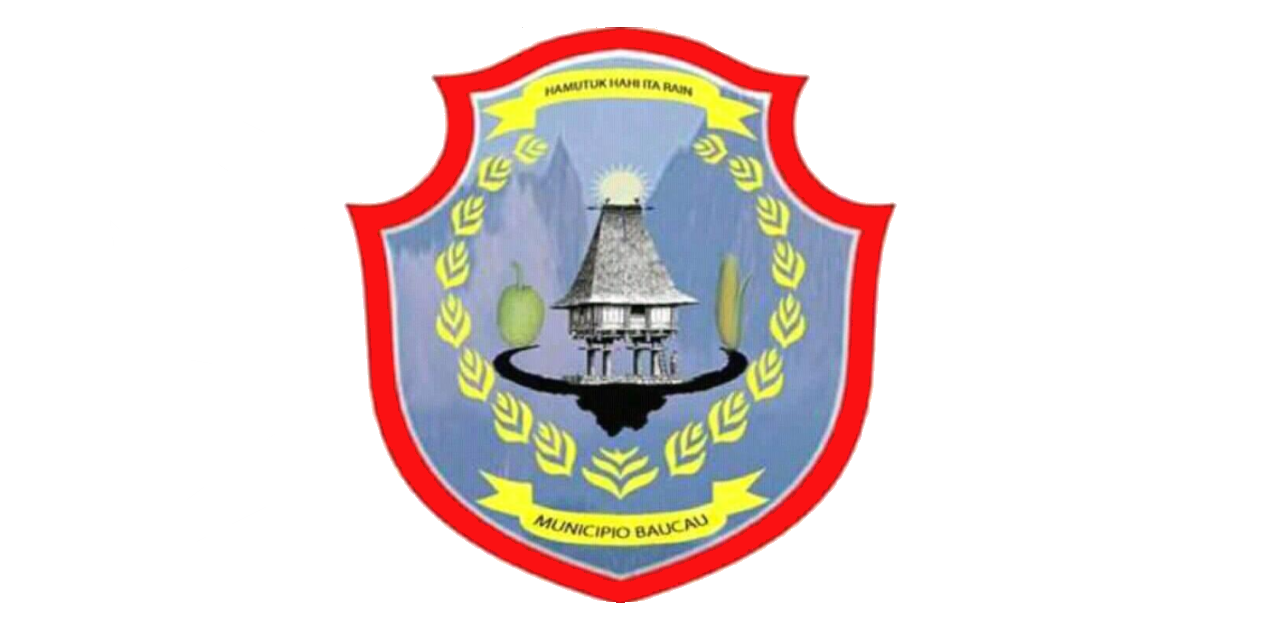
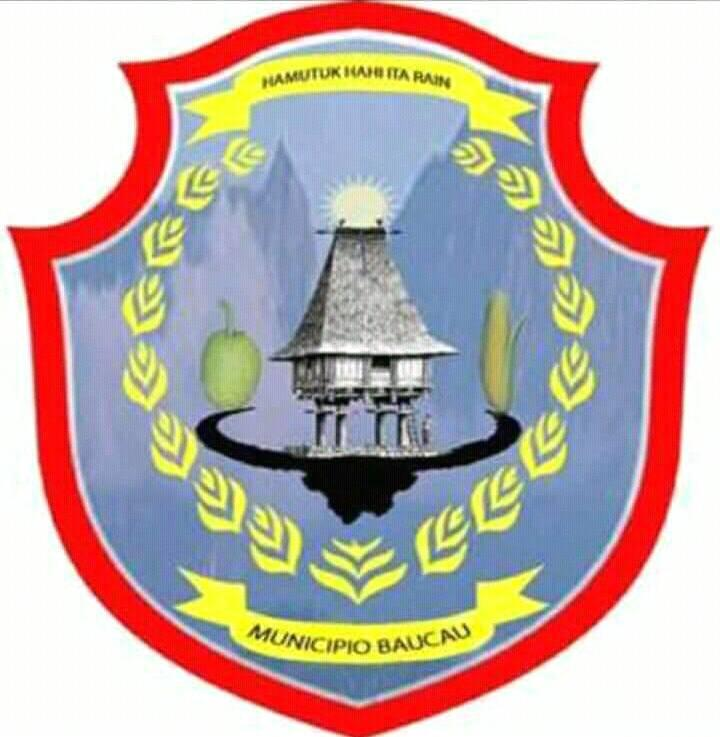
- Flag Coat of arms

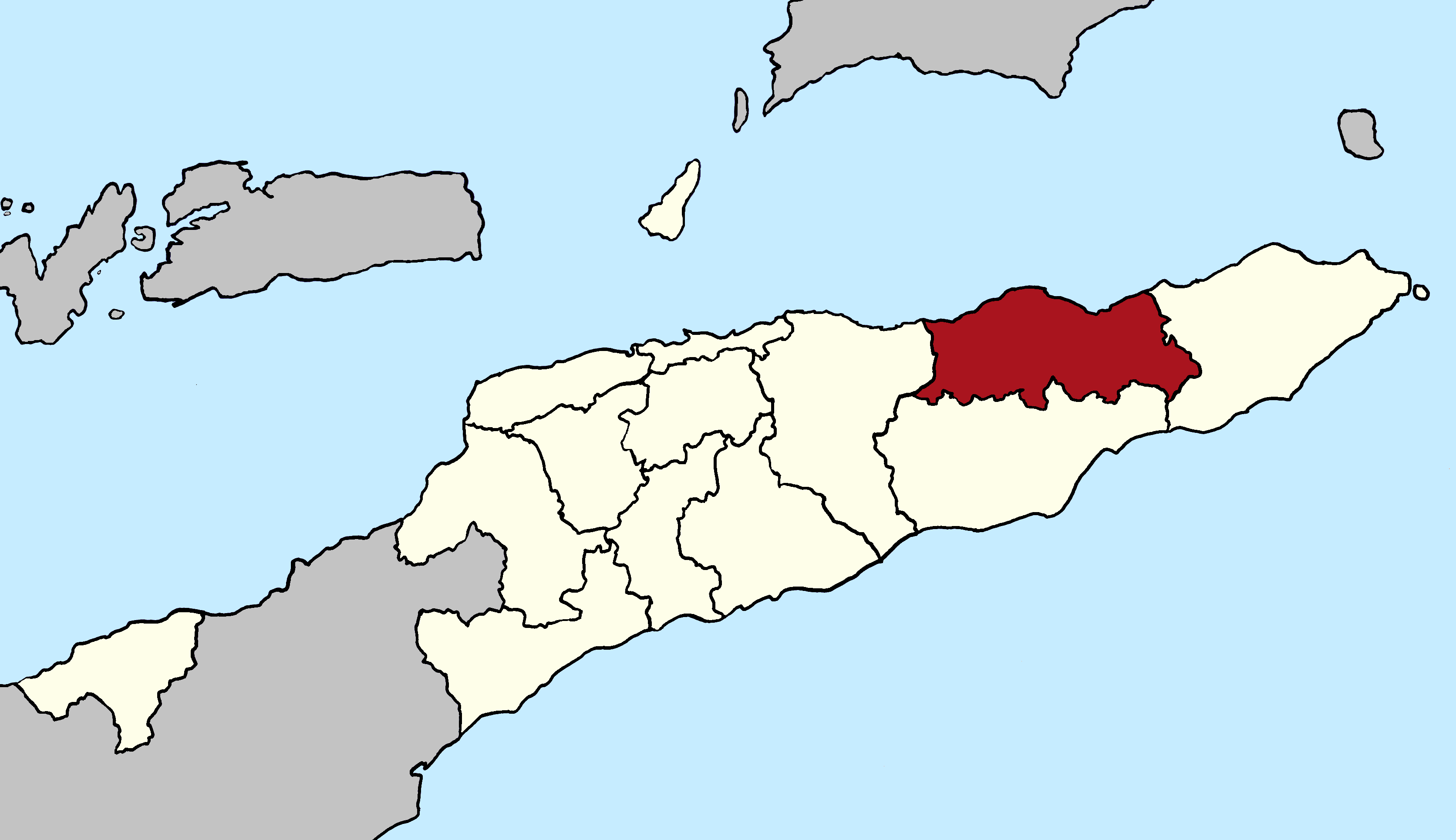
- Baucau in Timor-Leste
- Interactive map of Baucau
- Coordinates: 8°35′S 126°30′E
- Country: Timor-Leste
- Capital: Baucau
- Administrative Posts: Baguia; Baucau; Laga; Quelicai; Vemasse; Venilale

Area
  - Total: 1,504.2 km^{2} (580.8 sq mi)
  - Rank: 4th

Population (2015 census)
  - Total: 123,203
  - Rank: 3rd
  - Density: 81.906/km^{2} (212.14/sq mi)
  - Rank: 5th

Households (2015 census)
  - Total: 22,976
  - Rank: 3rd
- Time zone: UTC+09:00 (TLT)
- ISO 3166 code: TL-BA
- HDI (2017): 0.602 medium · 9th
- Website: Baucau Municipality

Baucau (Portuguese: Município Baucau, Tetun: Munisípiu Baukau) is a municipality, and was formerly a district, of Timor-Leste, on the northern coast in the eastern part of the country. The capital is also called Baucau (formerly Vila Salazar). The population of the municipality is 111,694 (census 2010) and it has an area of 1,506 km^{2}.

== Toponymy ==
The word Baucau is derived from the word "Akau", which means "pig" in the local Waimoa language.

During the Portuguese colonial era, the name of the district was transformed, first into Macau and finally into Baucau. An alternative name for the Baucau community is Wailia-Wailewa, meaning the "great water spring of Wai Lia". In the Wai Lia area (part of the suco of Bahu), a large spring is located under large trees; it is both an animist and a Christian holy place.

In 1936, the Portuguese colonial authorities renamed what was then the district of Baucau as "São Domingos". However, that name, like other imperial-sounding names adopted in the colony at about that time, did not catch on, and a few years after World War II it was quietly abandoned.

== Geography ==
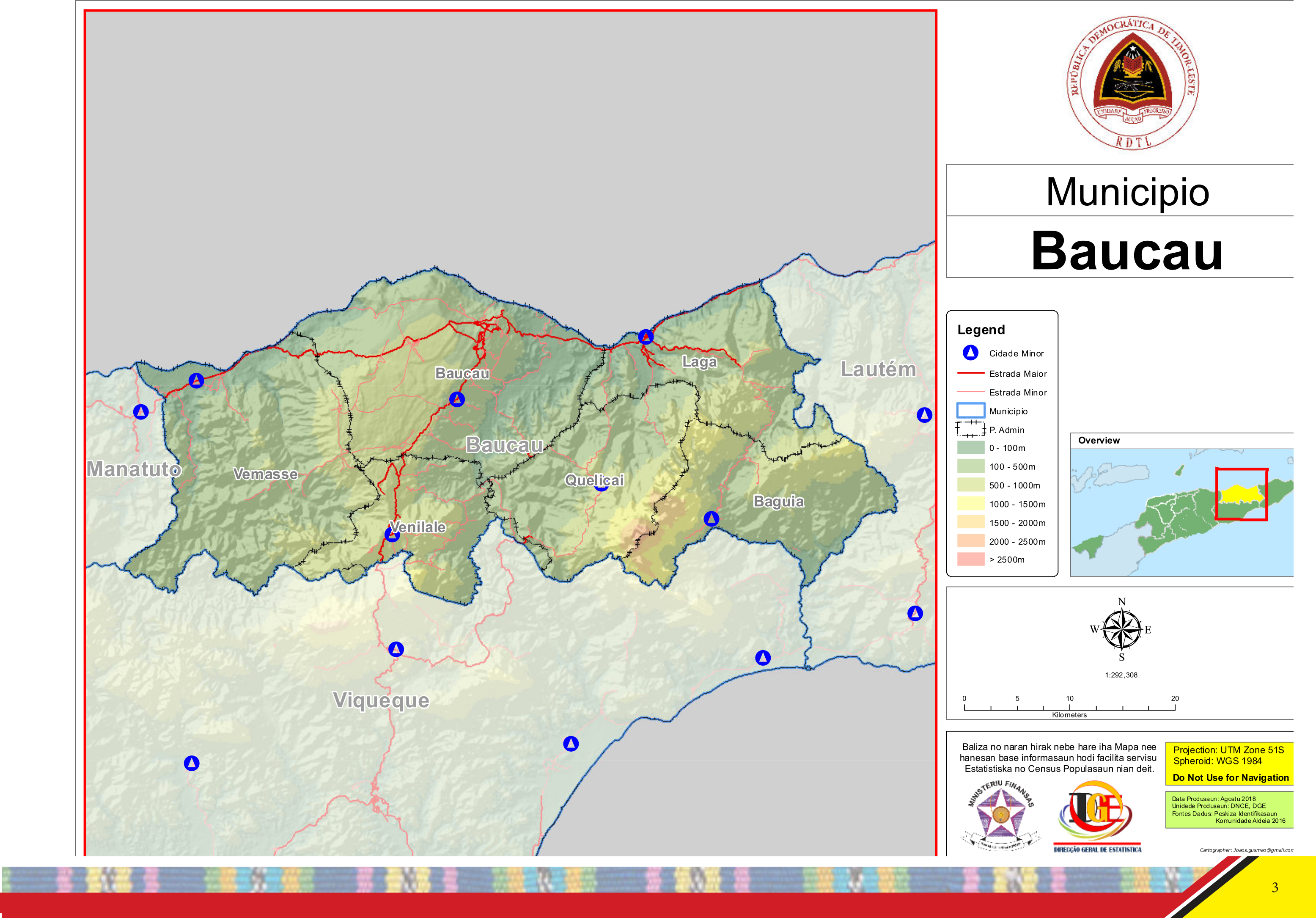
Official map

The borders of the District of Baucau during the colonial era were the same as they are now. The north edge of the municipality is to the Wetar Strait; it also borders the municipalities of Lautém to the east, Viqueque to the south, and Manatuto to the west.

Baucau also has a wide coastline with sandy beaches, ideal for swimming and other watersports.

In the administrative post of Venilale are tunnels that the Japanese built during their occupation during the Second World War. Also in this administrative post is an ongoing project to reconstruct and renovate the Escola do Reino de Venilale (School of the Kingdom of Venilale).

== Administrative posts ==
The municipality's administrative posts (formerly sub-districts) are:

- Baguia
- Baucau
- Laga
- Matebian
- Quelicai
- Quelicai Antigo
- Vemasse
- Venilale (formerly known as Vila Viçosa).

== Demographics ==
Besides the national official languages of Tetun and Portuguese, most of the inhabitants speak the Papuan language Makasae. While most of the inhabitants are Roman Catholics, a few Muslims also live there.

== Economy ==
Baucau has the most highly developed agriculture in Timor-Leste. Besides the staples rice and corn, Baucau produces beans, peanuts, sweet potatoes, copra, candlenut and manioc. It also raises buffalo and goats. A shortage of transportation links and the unpredictability of energy availability stymie the development of emerging industries.

== Infrastructure ==
Baucau has the country's longest airport runway, in Cakung Airport, as currently, Dili's Nicolau Lobato International Airport can only serve small airliners like the Boeing 737. The airport is located six km from the city of Baucau. It served as the country's principal airport before the Indonesian invasion in 1975, when it was taken over by the Indonesian military. Bucoli, a village with symbolic role in the East Timorese resistance movement against Indonesian occupation, is located in the subdistrict of Baucau.

== Notable people ==
- Carlos Filipe Ximenes Belo
- Mário Viegas Carrascalão
- Aurélio Sérgio Cristóvão Guterres
- Olinda Guterres
- Vicente Guterres
- Maria Fernanda Lay
- Adaljiza Magno
- Mauk Moruk
- Taur Matan Ruak
- Aurora Ximenes
- Mariana Diaz Ximenez
