= Bucoli =

Suco

Coordinates: 8.4856°S 126.3383°E

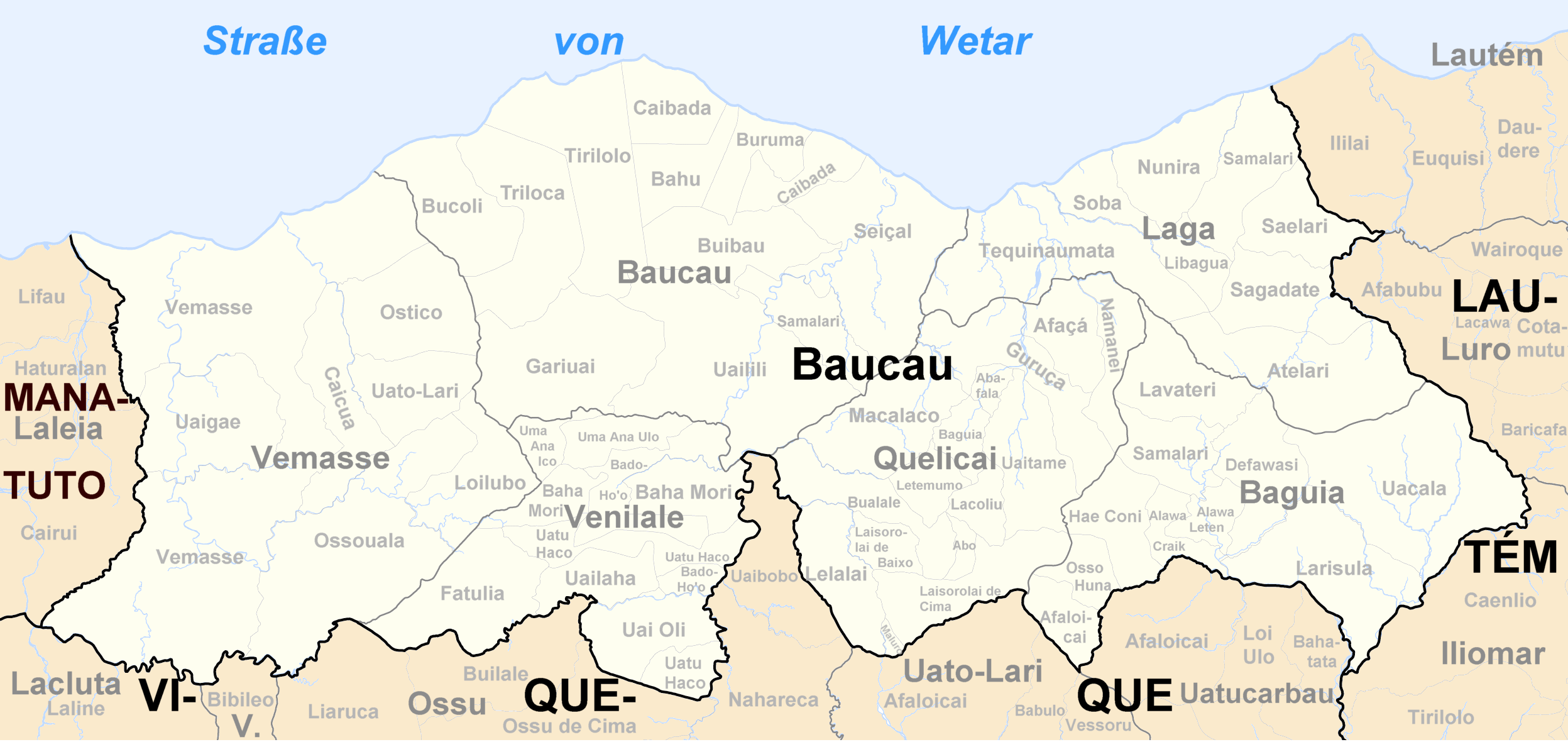
Bucoli Suco lies in the northwest of Baucau Subdistrict, at the coast of Baucau District (borders between 2003 and 2015)

Bucoli is a suco (municipality) in Baucau Subdistrict, Baucau District, Timor-Leste and also a settlement in the Bucoli Suco. As of 2010 there were 2179 inhabitants and 372 households in Bucoli Suco.

Bucoli was the home of guerrilla warrior Vicente dos Reis and has a symbolic status in East Timorese nationalism. National Unity of Timorese Resistance (Portuguese: União Nacional Democrática de Resistência Timorense (UNDERTIM)) chose to establish its first headquarters in Bucoli in 2005 because of the role of the village in the history of the East Timorese resistance movement.
