= Timor and Wetar deciduous forests =

Ecoregion in Indonesia and East Timor

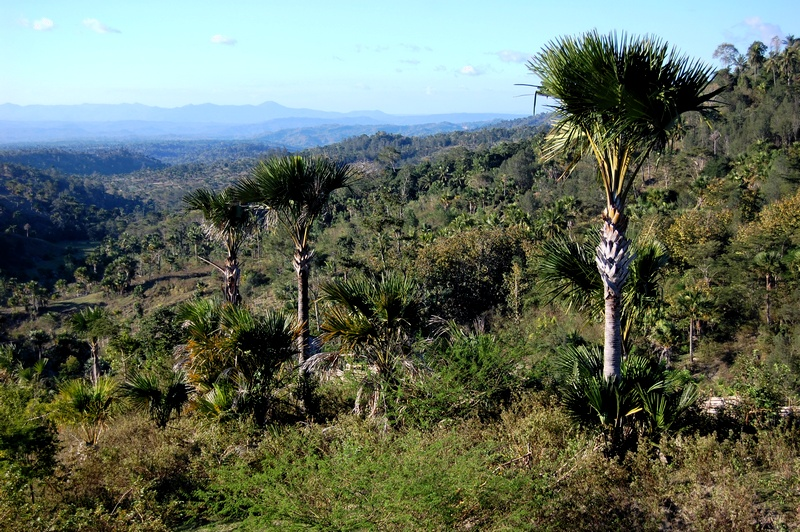
- Corypha utan palms in hilly savanna near Ayotupas, West Timor

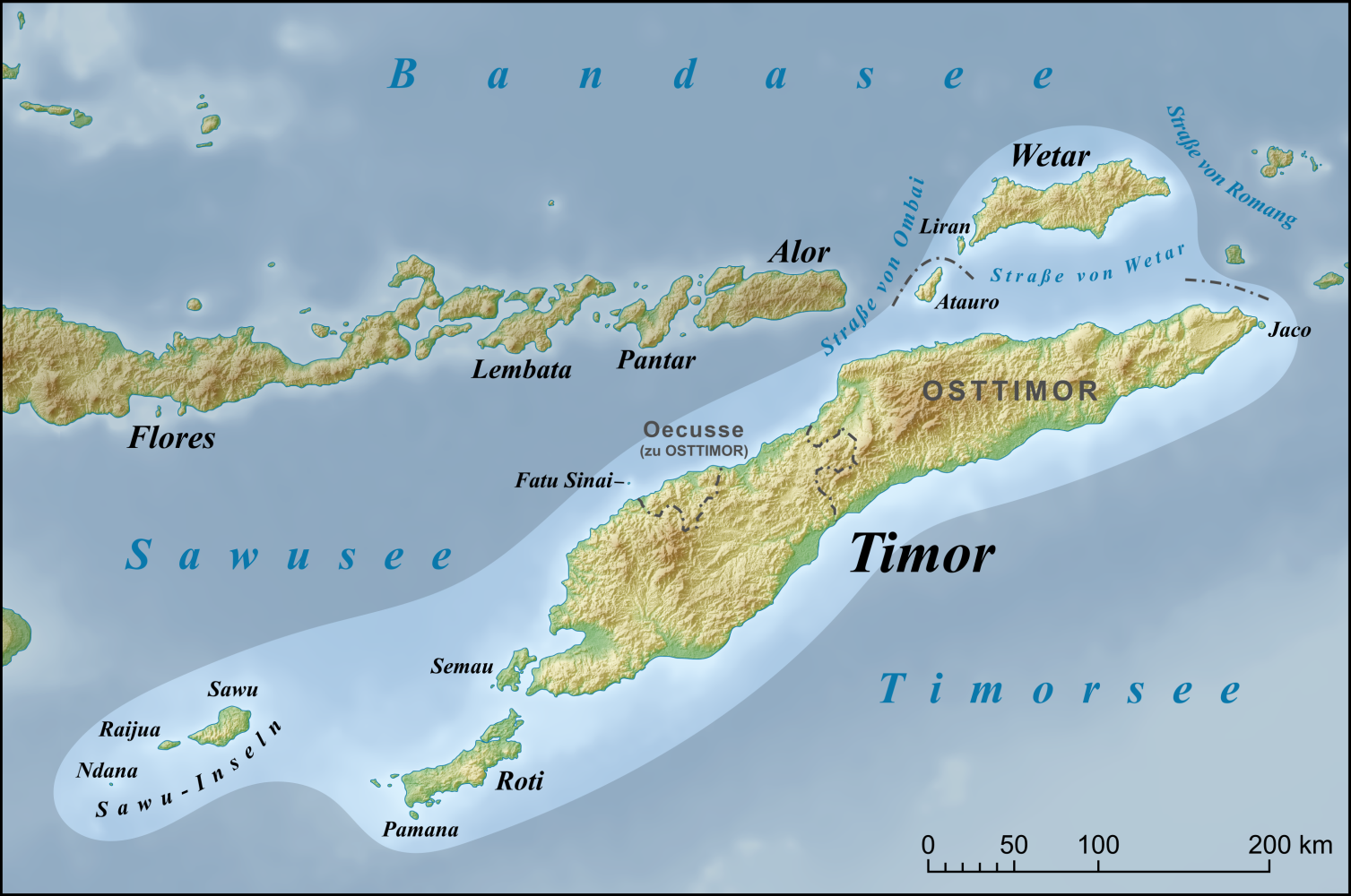
- Ecoregion territory (highlighted islands)

Ecology
- Realm: Australasian realm
- Biome: tropical and subtropical dry broadleaf forests

Geography
- Area: 33,091 km^{2} (12,777 sq mi)
- Countries: Indonesia; East Timor
- Provinces of Indonesia: East Nusa Tenggara; Maluku
- Coordinates: 9.1°S 125.1°E

Conservation
- Conservation status: Critical/endangered
- Protected: 2,245 km^{2} (7%)

The Timor and Wetar deciduous forests is a tropical dry forest ecoregion in Indonesia and East Timor. The ecoregion includes the islands of Timor, Wetar, Rote, Savu, and adjacent smaller islands.

== Geography ==
Timor, Wetar, Rote, and Savu are part of the Lesser Sunda Islands. The ecoregion is part of Wallacea, a group of islands that are part of the Australasian realm, but were never joined to either the Australian or Asian continents. The islands of Wallacea are home to a mix of plants and animals from both terrestrial realms, and have many unique species that evolved in isolation.

Timor is the largest of the islands at 30,777 km^{2}. Timor is politically divided; The independent country of Timor Leste is on the eastern portion of Timor, and western Timor and the other islands are part of Indonesia. Western Timor, Rote, and Savu are part of East Nusa Tenggara province, while Wetar is part of Maluku Province.

The islands are mostly mountainous, and Tatamailau on Timor is the highest point at 2986 meters elevation. Wetar reaches 1,407 meters elevation.

== Climate ==
The ecoregion has a tropical monsoon climate. The islands are in the rain shadow of Australia, and are among the driest in Indonesia. Rainfall is strongly seasonal, and April through November are generally the driest months. The windward southern side of the islands and receive annual rainfall of 2000 mm or more, with a two- to four-month dry season with less than 100 mm per month. The leeward north side of the island is much drier, receiving 1000 mm or less, with nine or more dry months. Some south-facing mountain areas above 900 meters elevation are humid year-round.

== Flora ==
Forest types include lowland evergreen rain forests, montane evergreen rain forests, semi-evergreen rain forests, moist deciduous forests, dry deciduous forests, and thorn forest/scrub. Evergreen and semi-evergreen rain forests occur in high-rainfall areas on the south side of the island. Deciduous forests and thorn forests are more widespread. Little primary forest remains; most forests are secondary. Extensive burning for shifting cultivation, grazing by goats and other livestock, and tree harvesting has reduced much of the island to anthropogenic grassland and scrub, including many invasive exotic shrubs.

Savannas are common in the lowlands, and are of four types – palm savanna with Borassus flabellifer, eucalyptus savanna with Eucalyptus alba, acacia savanna, and casuarina savanna. Other plant communities include coastal dune grasslands and shrublands.

Sandalwood (Santalum album) and candle nut (Aleurites moluccanus) are important tree crops harvested from the wild. Sandalwood was economically important, but over-harvesting has left it scarce and critically endangered.

== Fauna ==
The ecoregion has thirty-eight mammal species. The Timor shrew (Crocidura tenuis) and Timor rat (Rattus timorensis) are endemic. Two species were believed to have been brought to the islands long ago by humans – the Northern common cuscus (Phalanger orientalis), a marsupial originating in New Guinea, and the Javan rusa (Rusa timorensis), a deer originating in Java and Bali.

The ecoregion is home to 229 bird species. It corresponds to the Timor and Wetar endemic bird area. 23 species are endemic.

=== Extinct fauna ===
Giant rats in the genus Coryphomys are believed to have gone extinct 1000–2000 years ago. Fossils of two species of Stegodon, an elephant relative, have been found on Timor, the most recent approximately 130,000 years old. Mid-Pleistocene fossils of a giant monitor lizard, similar in size and related to the living Komodo dragon found on Flores and neighboring islands, have also been found on Timor.

== Protected areas ==
A 2017 assessment found that 2,245 km^{2}, or 7%, of the ecoregion is in protected areas. About half the unprotected area is still forested. Protected areas include Nino Konis Santana National Park (588.99 km²) and Kay Rala Xanana Gusmão National Park (92.31 km²) in East Timor.
