= Quelicai Administrative Post =

Administrative post in Baucau Municipality, East Timor

Quelicai
- Administrative Post
- Posto Administrativo de Quelicai (Portuguese); Postu administrativu Kelikai (Tetum)
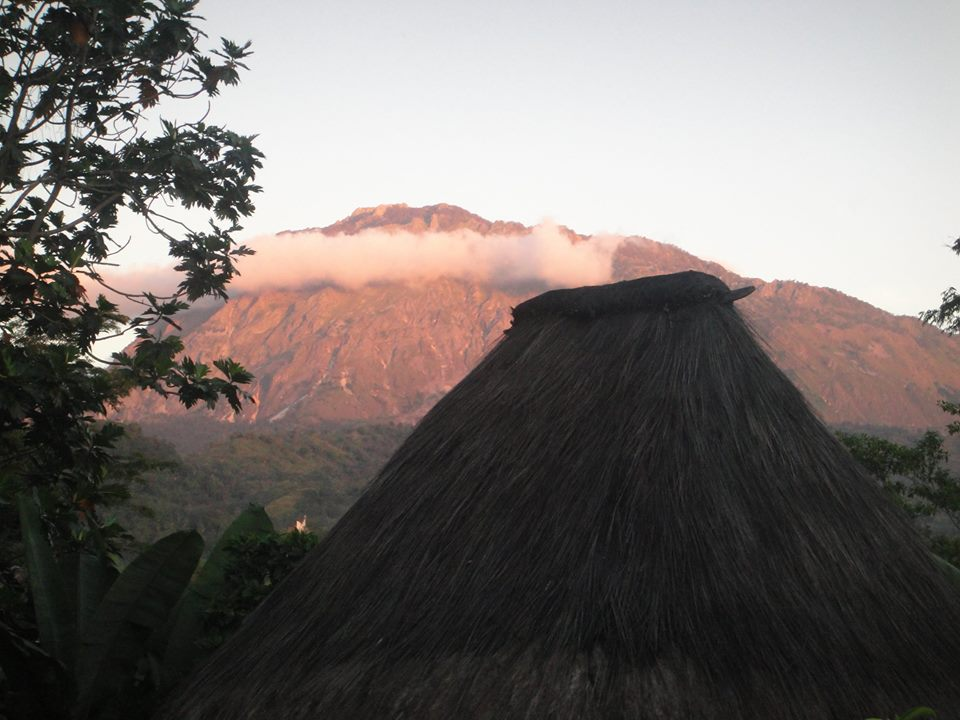
- View of Matebian from Quelicai

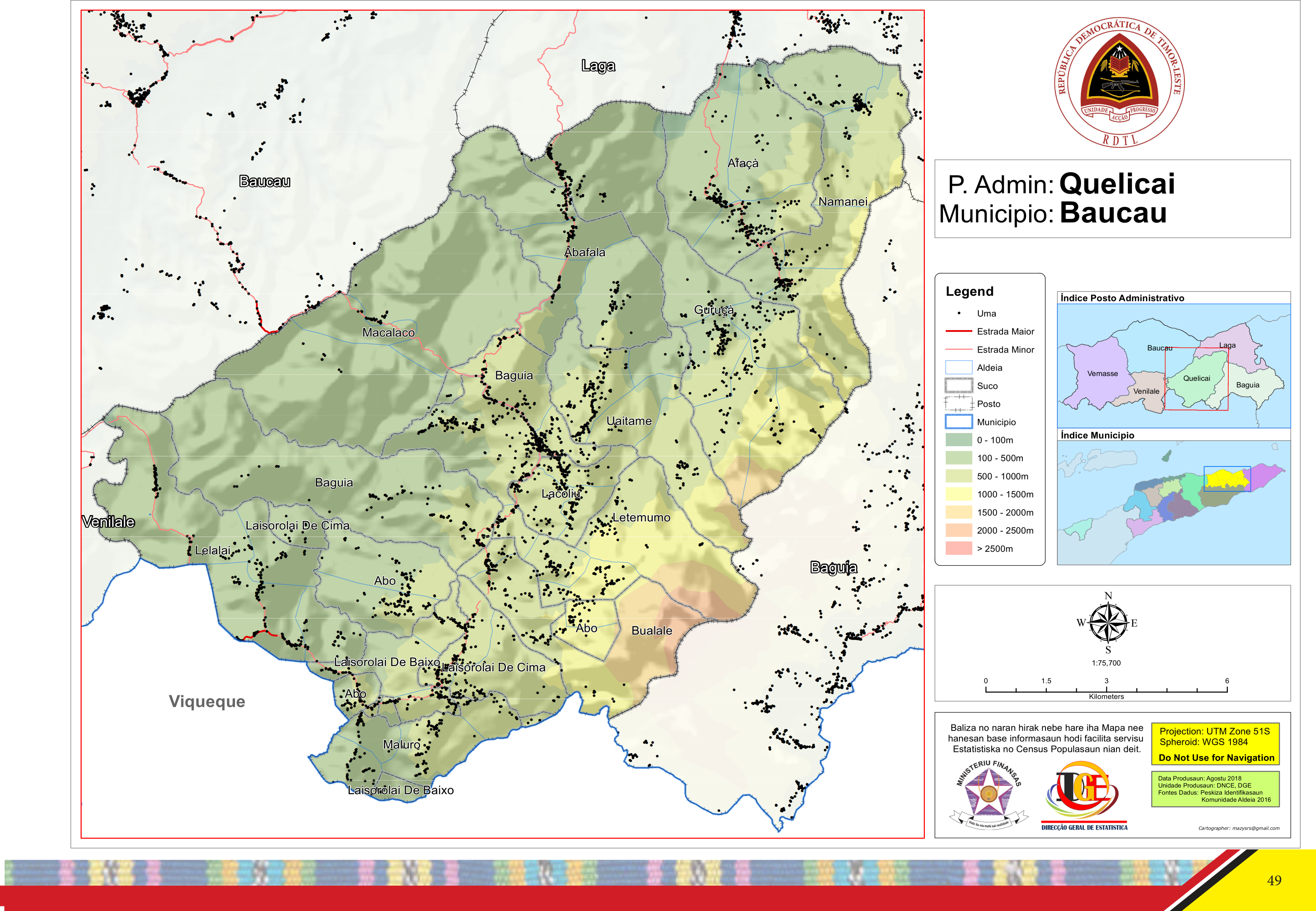
- Official map

- Location within East Timor
- Coordinates: 8°36′S 126°34′E
- Country: Timor-Leste
- Municipality: Baucau
- Seat: Lacoliu
- Sucos: Abafala; Abo; Afaçá; Baguia; Bualale; Guruça; Lacoliu; Laisorolai de Baixo; Laisorolai de Cima; Lelalai; Letemumo; Macalaco; Maluro; Namanei; Uaitame

Area
  - Total: 214.1 km^{2} (82.7 sq mi)

Population (2015 census)
  - Total: 17,450
  - Density: 81.50/km^{2} (211.1/sq mi)

Households (2015 census)
  - Total: 3,806
- Time zone: UTC+09:00 (TLT)

Quelicai, officially Quelicai Administrative Post (Portuguese: Posto Administrativo de Quelicai, Tetum: Postu administrativu Kelikai), is an administrative post (and was formerly a subdistrict) in Baucau municipality, Timor-Leste. Its seat or administrative centre is Lacoliu.
