= Baucau Administrative Post =

Administrative post in Baucau Municipality, East Timor

Baucau
- Administrative Post
- Posto Administrativo de Baucau (Portuguese); Postu administrativu Baukau (Tetun)
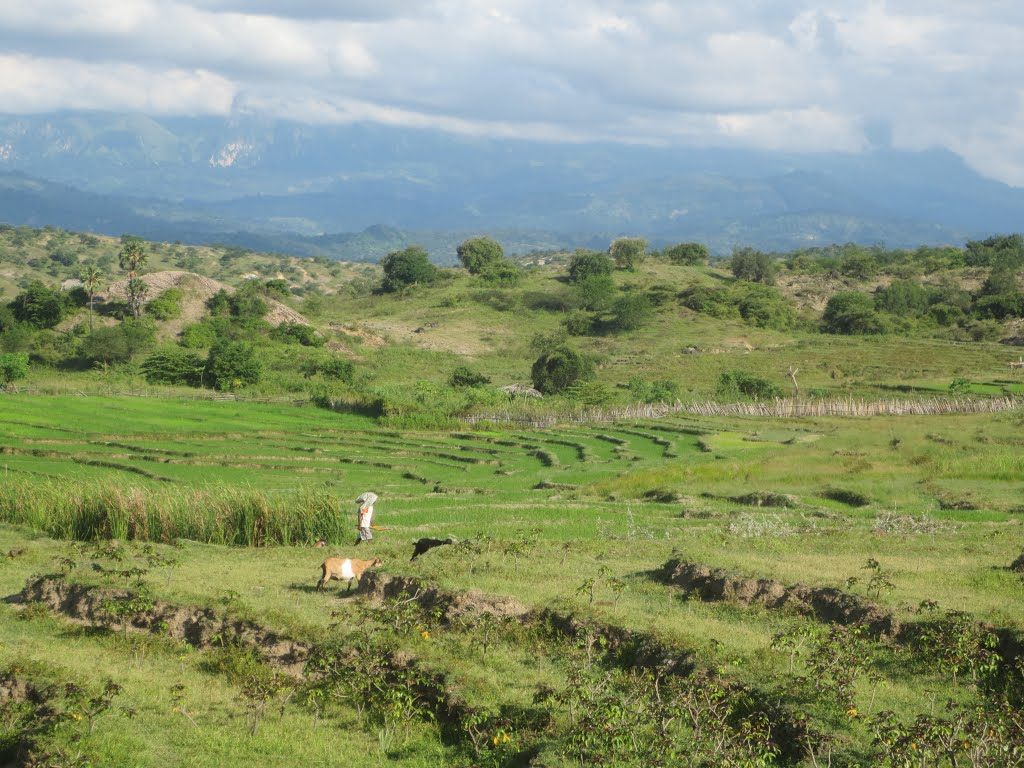
- Rice fields in Caibada with Mount Matebian in the background

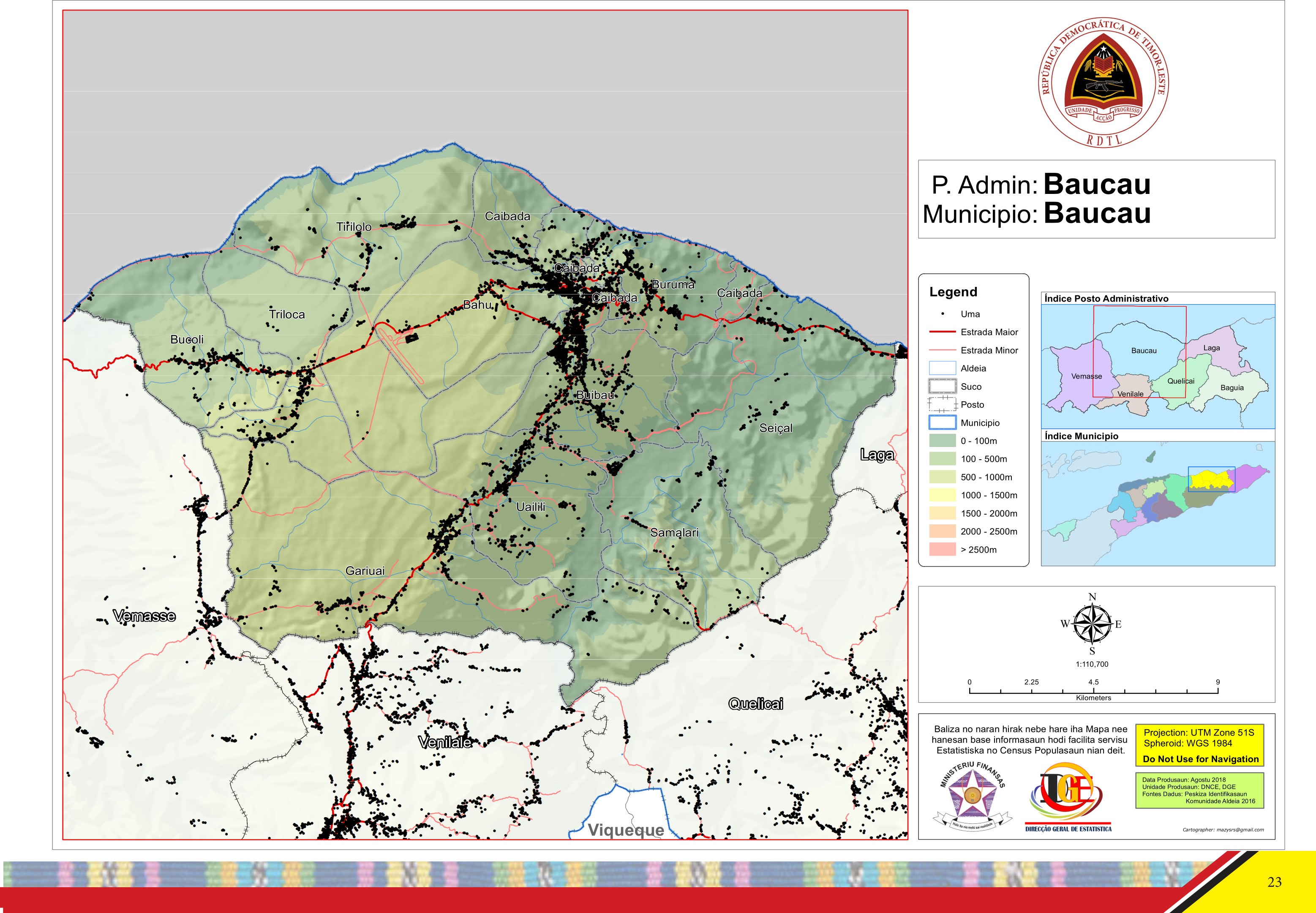
- Official map

- Location within East Timor
- Coordinates: 8°28′S 126°27′E
- Country: Timor-Leste
- Municipality: Baucau
- Seat: Bahu
- Sucos: Bahu; Bucoli; Buibau; Buruma; Caibada; Gariuai; Samalari; Seiçal; Tirilolo; Triloca; Uailili

Area
  - Total: 369.6 km^{2} (142.7 sq mi)

Population (2015 census)
  - Total: 47,294
  - Density: 128.0/km^{2} (331.4/sq mi)

Households (2015 census)
  - Total: 8,060
- Time zone: UTC+09:00 (TLT)

Baucau, officially Baucau Administrative Post (Portuguese: Posto Administrativo de Baucau, Tetun: Postu administrativu Baukau), is an administrative post (and was formerly a subdistrict) in Baucau municipality, Timor-Leste. Its seat or administrative centre is Bahú.
