= Lautém (city) =

Town in Lautém, East Timor

Coordinates: 8.364°S 126.904°E

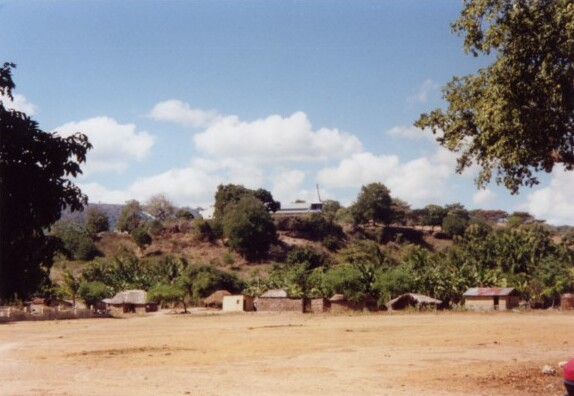
Village of Lautém/Timor-Leste on 24th June 2002

Lautém is a town in the suco of Pairara, Lautém Administrative Post, Lautém Municipality of Timor-Leste.

When Timor was a Portuguese overseas province, Lautém was known as Vila Nova de Malaca.

== Football ==
In football, the municipality of Lautém is represented by AS Lero, club affiliated to LFA, which disputes Liga Futebol Amadora Terceira Divisão.

== Tourism ==
Tourists who visit the place usually register images of the Lautem Fort in photographs. However, the main tourist attractions in the village are the beautiful beaches.

== External Sources ==
- The Modern Endangered Archives Program has a collection of Vaihoho Sung-Poems from Lautém available through the UCLA Library
