= Lautém =

Lautém (Tetum: Lautein) is a toponym for a place eastmost in East Timor. It may refer to, from small to large:

- Lautém (city)
- Lautém Administrative Post
- Lautém Municipality
