= Irabere River =

River in Timor-Leste

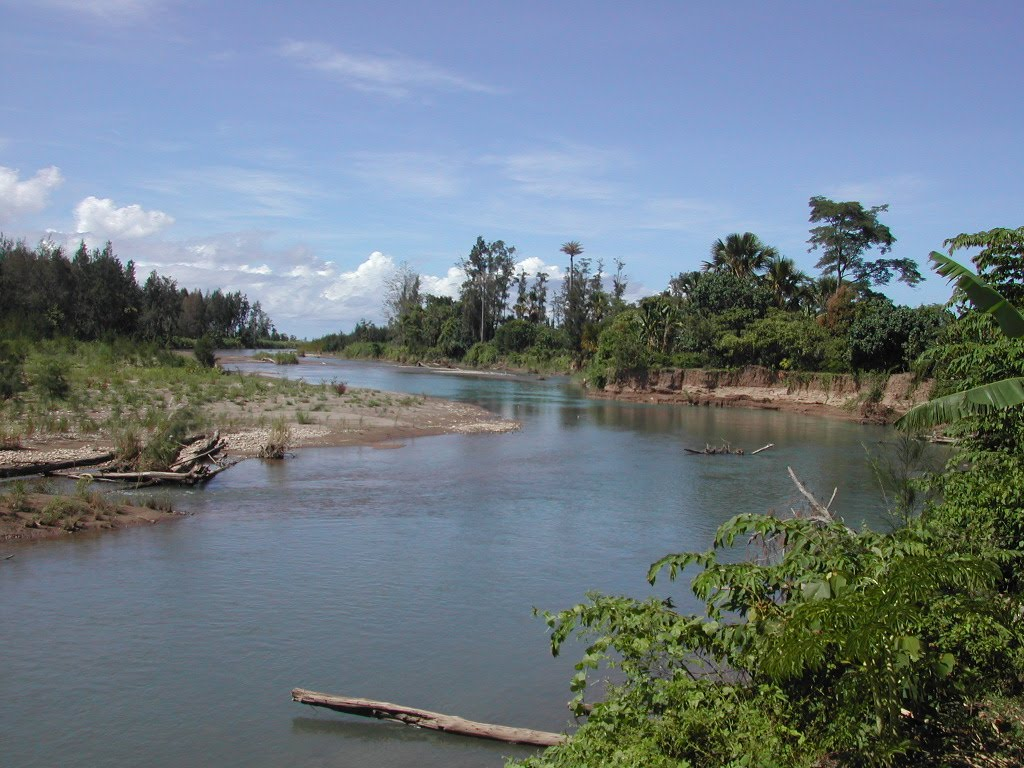
- The river running along the western border of Lautém municipality

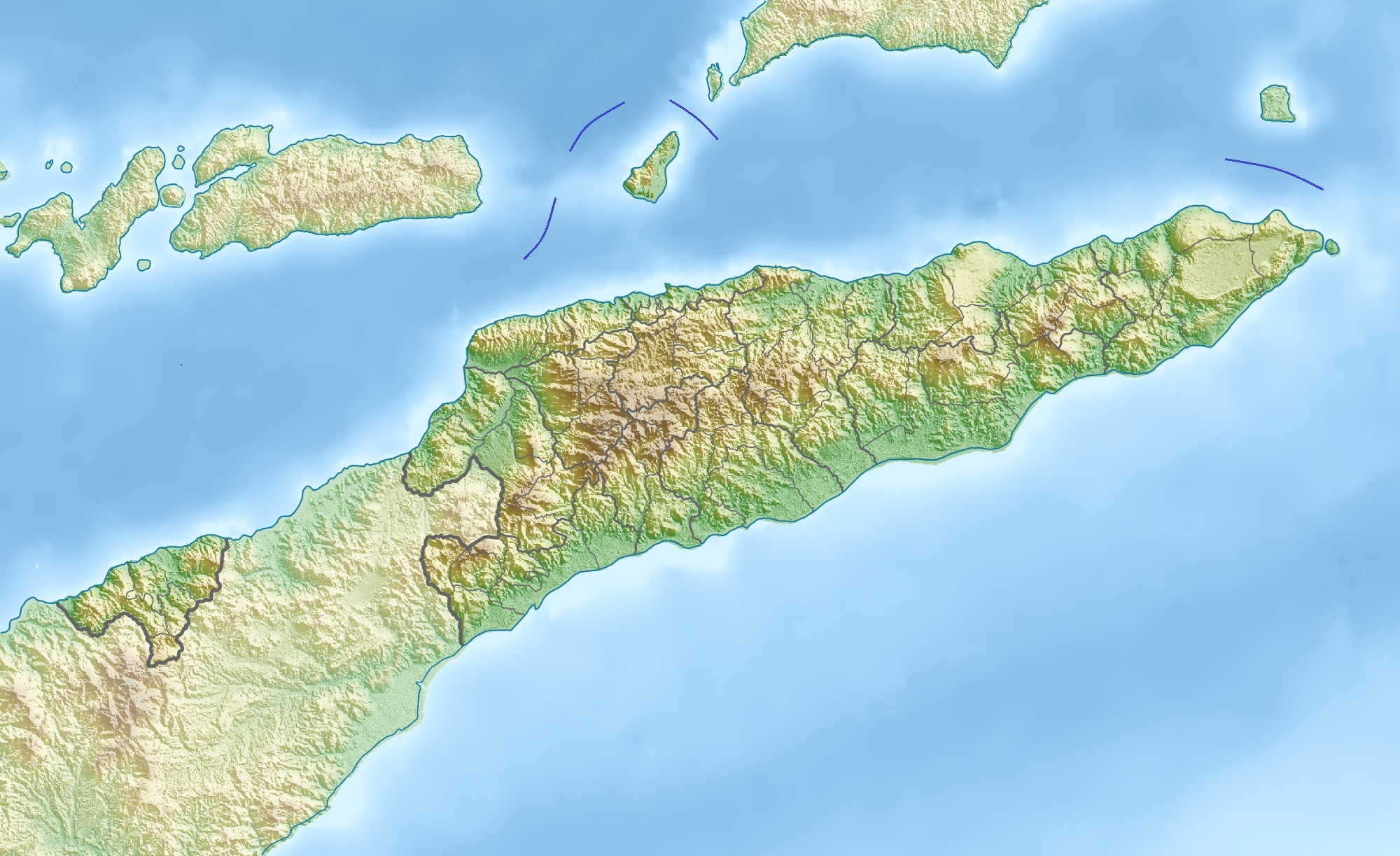
- Location of river mouth
- Native name: Ribeira de Irabere /; Rio Irabere (Portuguese); Mota Irabere (Tetum)

Location
- Country: Timor-Leste
- Municipalities: Baucau; Lautém; Viqueque

Physical characteristics
- Source confluence
  - location: Baucau / Lautém border
  - coordinates: 8°37′22″S 126°48′22″E
- Mouth: Timor Sea
  - location: Irabin Leteria, Viqueque
  - coordinates: 8°45′29″S 126°43′52″E
- Basin size: ~ 489 km^{2} (189 sq mi)

The Irabere River (Portuguese: Ribeira de Irabere or Rio Irabere, Tetum: Mota Irabere; transl. Big Water River), also known as the Ira Bere River, the Irebere River, and the Irabiri River, is a river in southeastern Timor-Leste that flows into the Timor Sea.

== Course ==
The headwaters of the river are in Suco Uacala, Baguia administrative post, Baucau municipality, and the adjacent Sucos Baricafa, Luro administrative post, and Caenlio, Iliomar administrative post, both of which are in Lautém municipality.

The river itself has its source at the confluence of its tributaries the Tunir and Afalita rivers, on the border between Sucos Uacala and Caenlio. From there, it flows southwestwards along the border between Lautém to the southeast and Baucau to the northwest, and then, from the tripoint between Baucau, Lautém and Viqueque municipalities, southwards along the whole of the border between Lautém to the east and Viqueque to the west, until it empties into the Timor Sea.

One of Timor-Leste's few perennial streams, the river is also one of only eight such watercourses in the country's south that can potentially be inhabited by saltwater crocodiles all year round (the others being the Bebui, Belulik, Caraulun, Clerec, Dilor, South Laclo, and Tafara rivers). Its estuary and adjacent forested land are part of the Irabere estuary and Iliomar forest Important Bird Area.

The main tributaries of the river, in order of entrance, are as follows:

- Letana River: rises in Suco Baricafa, Luro administrative post, Lautém; flows initially southwestwards to the tripoint between that suco, Suco Caenlio, Iliomar administrative post, Lautém, and Suco Uacala, Baguia administrative post, Baucau, where it merges with the Metan River to form the Tunir River; then flows southwards a short distance along the border between Sucos Caenlio and Uacala to where it merges with the Afalita River (see below) to form the Irabere River; (Note: As of January 2025, and contrary to the sources cited in this and the previous paragraph, Google Maps identified the stream described in this paragraph (ie the Letana and Tunir rivers) as "Rib Irabiri", and therefore as the uppermost reaches of the Irabere River.)
- Afalita River: rises approximately half way along the border between Sucos Baricafa, Luro administrative post, and Caenlio, Iliomar administrative post, both in Lautém; flows a short distance southwards along that border, and then southwestwards to the border between Suco Caenlio and Suco Uacala, Baguia administrative post, Baucau, where it merges with the Letana River (see above) to form the Irabere River;
- Sailuturo River: rises in Suco Caenlio, Iliomar administrative post, Lautém; flows northwestwards to the border between Suco Caenlio and Suco Uacala, Baguia administrative post, Baucau, where it enters the Irabere River;
- Boro River: has its source in the south of Suco Uacala, Baguia administrative post, Baucau, at the confluence between the Muadaco and Radala rivers; from there, flows southwards to, and then a short distance along, the border between Sucos Uacala and Larisula (or Lari Sula), also in Baguia administrative post, Baucau, to the tripoint between those two sucos and Suco Caenlio, Iliomar administrative post, Lautém, where it enters the Irabere River; one of its main tributaries, the Muadaco River, rises in northeastern Suco Uacala, and flows initially southwards and then southwestwards to the source confluence; its other main tributary, the Radala River, rises in northwestern Suco Uacala, flows southeastwards to where it is joined by its own main tributary (the Dana River, which rises in northern Suco Uacala and flows generally southwards); and then flows a short distance further southeastwards to the source confluence;
- Hifu River (or Ilifu River): rises on, and flows initially southeastwards along, the border between Sucos Uacala and Larisula (or Lari Sula), both in Baguia administrative post, Baucau; then flows southwards, followed by southeastwards, through Suco Larisula to its border with Suco Caenlio, Iliomar administrative post, Lautém, where it enters the Irabere River;
- Oulauai River: has its source at the western of the two tripoints of Sucos Larisula (or Lari Sula), Baguia administrative post, Baucau, and Bahatata and Loi Ulo, both in Uatucarbau administrative post, Viqueque (that tripoint is also the confluence between two of the river's main tributaries, the Danahine (or Danahae) and Loissouro rivers (see below)); flows along the border between Baucau and Viqueque, initially eastwards until the eastern tripoint between Sucos Larisula (or Lari Sula), Bahatata, and Loi Ulo, where it is joined on its left bank by another main tributary, the Togauai River (which rises in Suco Larisula (or Lari Sula) and flows southwards), and then southeastwards, until it enters the Irabere River at the tripoint between Baucau, Viqueque, and Lautém;
  - Danahine River (or Danahae River) (a main tributary of the Oulauai River (see above)): rises in Suco Defawasi, Baguia administrative post, Baucau, as the Danahoe River; flows generally southwestwards into and through Suco Samalari, Baguia administrative post, where it is joined on its right bank by a main tributary, the Dalassa River (which rises in Suco Samalari and flows generally southeastwards, joined part way along on its left bank by a tributary of its own, the Iraosso River); continues generally southeastwards, as the Danahine River (or Danahae River) through Sucos Alawa Leten and then Alawa Craik, both in Baguia administrative post, to the border between Sucos Alawa Craik and Larisula (or Lari Sula), Baguia administrative post, where it is joined on its left bank by another main tributary, the Mauai River (which rises on the border between Sucos Defawasi and Larisula (or Lari Sula), and flows generally southwestwards along that border); continues a short distance southeastwards along that border to the tripoint between those two sucos and Suco Bahatata, Uatucarbau administrative post, Viqueque, where it is joined on its right bank by yet another main tributary, the Bassaruai River (which rises on the border between Sucos Hae Coni, Baguia administrative post, Baucau, and Bahatata, Uatucarbau administrative post, Viqueque, and flows initially northeastwards, then southeastwards, along the border between Baucau and Viqueque); then flows southeastwards, along the border between Sucos Bahatata and Larisula (or Lari Sula), Baguia administrative post, until it merges with the Loissouro River (see above) to form the Oulauai River (see above);
  - Loissouro River (a main tributary of the Oulauai River (see above)): rises near the border between Sucos Irabin de Cima and Afaloicai, both in Uatucarbau administrative post, Viqueque; initially flows generally eastwards, along that border, and then, after the tripoint between those two sucos and Suco Loi Ulo, Uatucarbau administrative post, generally northeastwards along the border between Sucos Irabin de Cima and Loi Ulo, and later northwards along the border between Sucos Bahatata, Uatucarbau administrative post, and Loi Ulo, until it merges with the Danahine River (or Danahae River) (see above) to form the Oulauai River (see above);
- Calicidere River (or Caiicidere River): rises on or near, and flows eastwards along, the border between Sucos Bahatata and Irabin de Cima, both in Uatucarbau administrative post, Viqueque, until it reaches the quadripoint between those two sucos and Sucos Caenlio and Tirilolo, both in Iliomar administrative post, Lautém, where it enters the Irabere River;

== Catchment ==
The catchment or drainage basin of the river is one of Timor-Leste's 10 major catchments, and is approximately 489 km^{2} (189 sq mi) in area.

Timor-Leste has been broadly divided into twelve 'hydrologic units', groupings of climatologically and physiographically similar and adjacent river catchments. The Irabere River catchment is one of the four major catchments in the Irabere hydrologic unit, which is about 1,619.6 km^{2} (625.3 sq mi) in total area, and covers 10.9% of the country; the others are the catchments of the Namaluto, Bebui and Cuha rivers.

== See also ==
- List of rivers of Timor-Leste
