= Irabere estuary and Iliomar forest Important Bird Area =

Coordinates: 8°45′00″S 126°44′00″E

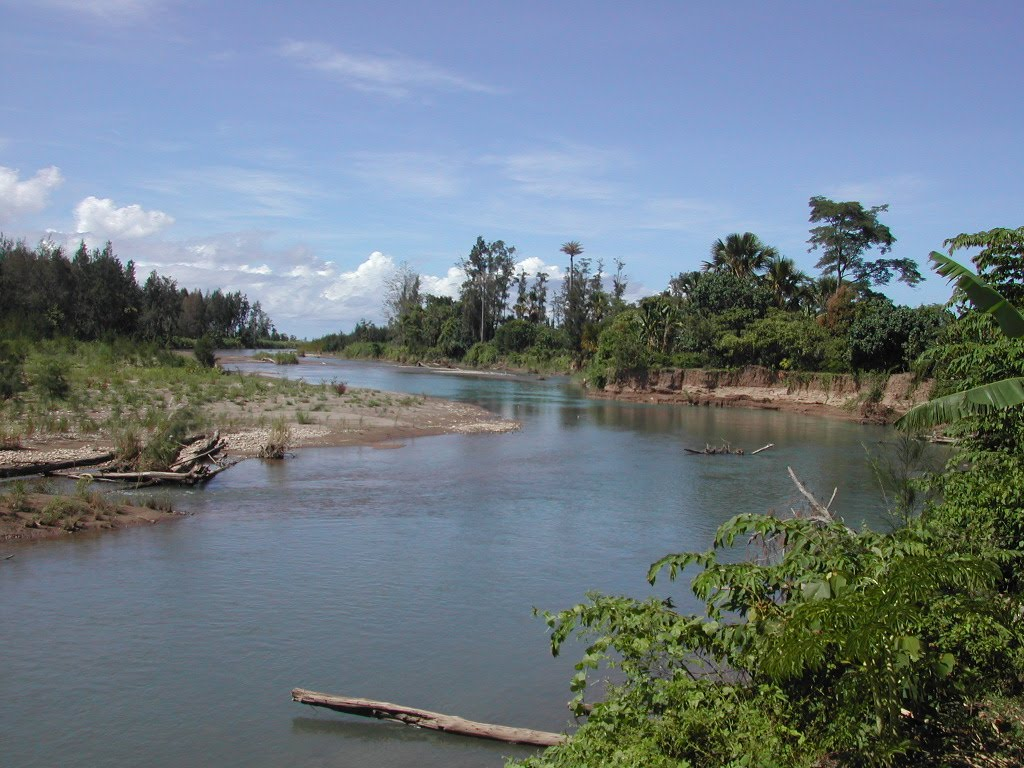
Irabere River

The Irabere estuary and Iliomar forest Important Bird Area is an Important Bird Area in Timor-Leste, a country occupying the eastern end of the island of Timor in the Lesser Sunda Islands of Wallacea.

== Description ==
The 16,554 ha IBA lies on the border between the districts of Viqueque to the west and Lautém to the east. In elevation it ranges from sea level to about 500 m. It contains the area around the Irabere River estuary, which is vegetated by degraded semi-evergreen forest on alluvial soils, Casuarina forest along the river and agricultural land. It extends to encompass tropical dry forest and moist deciduous forest, with scattered patches of cultivation, in the subdistrict of Iliomar from east of the river for about 20 km inland.

== Birds ==
The site has been identified by BirdLife International as an Important Bird Area because it support populations of bar-necked cuckoo-doves, pink-headed imperial pigeons, yellow-crested cockatoos, jonquil parrots, streak-breasted honeyeaters, Timor friarbirds, plain gerygones, fawn-breasted whistlers, olive-brown orioles, Timor stubtails, blue-cheeked flowerpeckers and flame-breasted sunbirds.

== See also ==
- List of Important Bird Areas in Timor-Leste
