= Cacavei =

Village (suco) in Timor-Leste

Coordinates: 8.5681°S 126.8850°E

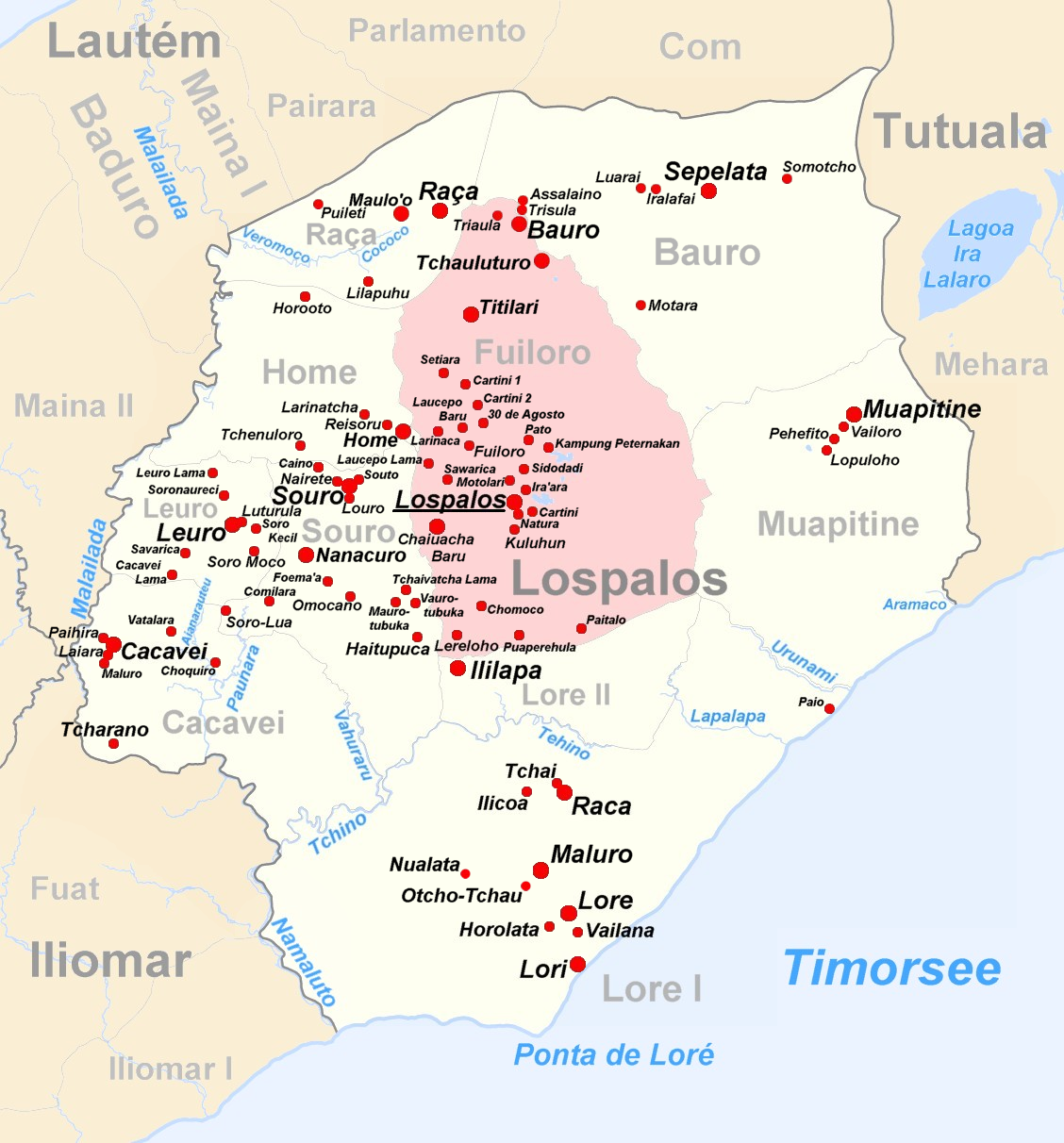
Subdistrit of Lospalos with suco Cacavei

Cacavei is a village (suco) in Timor-Leste. It is located in Lospalos sub-district and Lautem district. This village is in between Lospalos town and Iliomar sub-district.

== Data ==
Surface 50.50 km ² [1] Population 864 (2.01 thousand) Chefe de Suco José Marques (2009 election) Places Position Height Cacavei ♁ 8 ° 34 ' S, 126 ° 53 ' O 303 m Choquiro ♁ 8 ° 34 ' S, 126 ° 55 ' O 252 m Laiara ♁ 8 ° 34 ' S, 126 ° 53 ' O 303 m Maluro ♁ 8 ° 34 ' S, 126 ° 53 ' O 313 m Paihira ♁ 8 ° 34 ' S, 126 ° 53 ' O [4] 303 m Tcharano ♁ 8 ° 36 ' S, 126 ° 53 ' O 285 m Vatalara ♁ 8 ° 34 ' S, 126 ° 54 ' O 261 m Cacavei (East Timor) Cacavei ( Cacaven, Cacavem, Kakavei, Kakaven, Cacuvem ) is an osttimoresisches village in Suco Cacavei (subdistrict Lospalos, District loud ).

== The place ==
The village Cacavei is in the northwest of the Sucos at an altitude of 303 m. In the immediate vicinity of the settlements are Cacavei Laiara, Maluro and Paihira . The village center has a primary school and a health center.

Cacavei has 864 inhabitants (2010 2004: 879). Almost 95% of the population speaks Fataluku as their native language. Other languages include Sa'ane, Makasae, Tetum Prasa, Tetum Terik and Makalero.

== Location ==
The village is located the west part of the sub-district Lospalos and has an area size of 50.50 km ². To the north it borders Suco Leuro and on the northeast the Suco Souro. To the southeast is Suco Lore I.

To the southwest lies the subdistrict Iliomar with the village Fuat and to the northwest the Suco Maina II. Across the village is the Paunara river which flows from north to south. Its sources is in the Suco Souro. From the west, here ends the originating within Cacavei flow Ainarauteu. At the southern boundary of the Paunara river it travels to the southeast and represents the border to Suco Fuat. After hitting the Pirusoro on the border river from Fuat, it changes its name to Namaluto. The southern part of the border between Cacavei and Souro forms the river Vahurau. Once the border of Lore I reaches it, it opens into the river Tchino, which then flows along the border to the west and finally empties into the Namaluto.

East of the Cacavei's village center are Choquiro and Vatalara, south of the city Tcharano (Charano). The places are above the provincial road linking the capital district Lospalos with the district Iliomar. East of Paunara there are no more major settlements.

In Cacavei are the four aldeias Laiara, Paihara, Sole Para and Tcharano.

== Politics ==
In the elections of 2004/2005 José Marques was elected Chefe de Suco. In the 2009 elections José Marques won again.

== See also ==
- Ulurapa, a mountain in the village
