= Sucos of Timor-Leste =

Administrative posts

Map of municipalities, administrative posts and sucos of Timor-Leste (borders between 2003 and 2015)

The administrative posts (formerly subdistricts) of Timor-Leste are subdivided into 461 sucos ("villages") and 2,336 aldeias ("communities"). Sucos have been part of the country's administrative system since the 20th century, under Portuguese, Japanese, Indonesian, and independent rule.

== List ==
=== Aileu Municipality ===
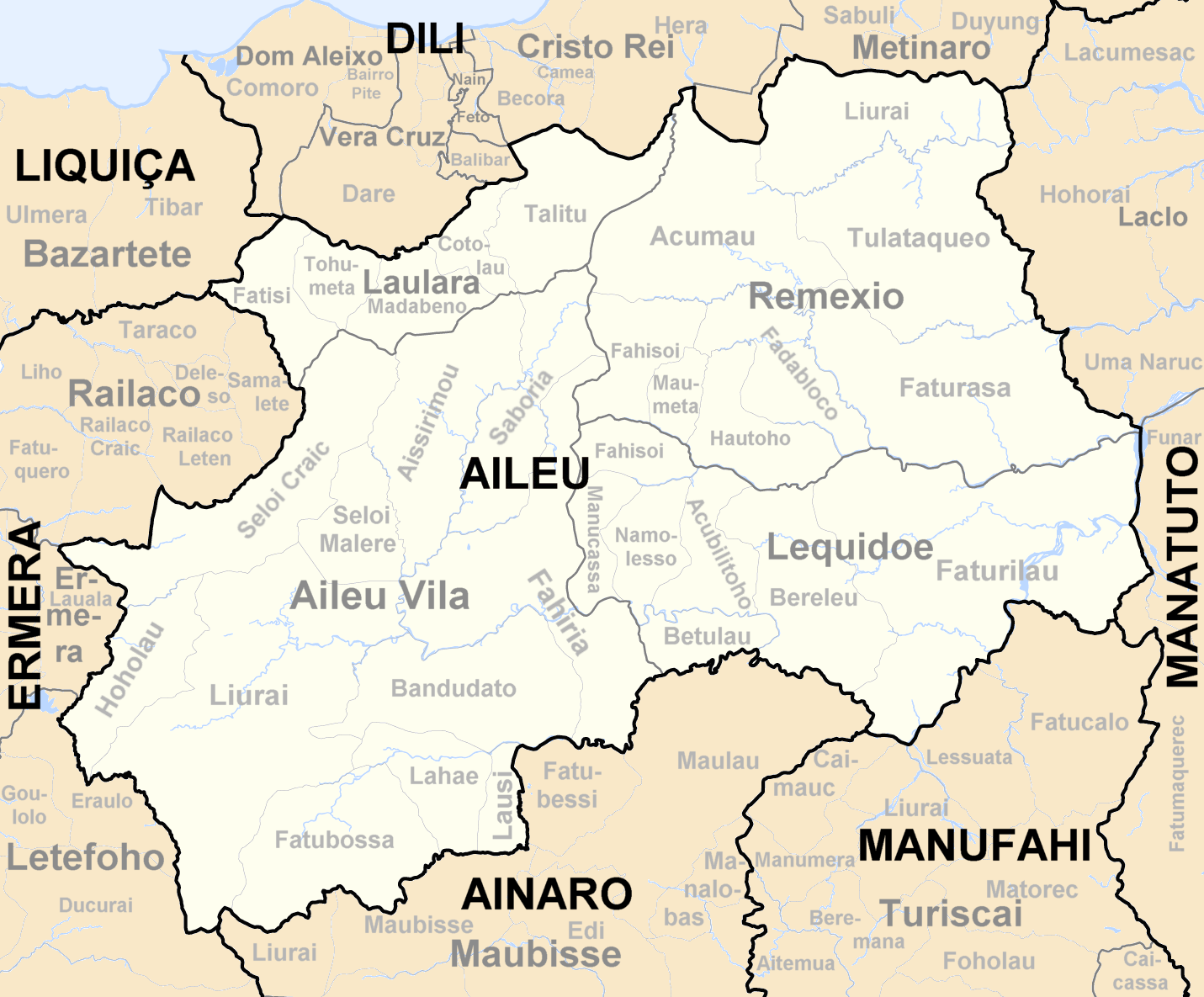
Sucos of Aileu (borders between 2003 and 2015)

- Aileu Administrative Post
1. Suco Aissirimou
2. Suco Bandudato
3. Suco Fahiria
4. Suco Fatubossa
5. Suco Hoholau
6. Suco Lahae
7. Suco Lauisi
8. Suco Saboria
9. Suco Seloi Craic
10. Suco Seloi Malere
11. Suco Liurai
12. Suco Lequitura
- Laulara Administrative Post
1. Suco Cotolau
2. Suco Fatisi
3. Suco Madabeno
4. Suco Talitu
5. Suco Tohumeta
6. Suco Bocalelo
- Lequidoe Administrative Post
1. Suco Acubilitoho
2. Suco Bereleu
3. Suco Betulau
4. Suco Fahisoi
5. Suco Faturilau
6. Suco Manucassa
7. Suco Namolesso
- Remexio Administrative Post
1. Suco Acumau
2. Suco Fadabloco
3. Suco Fahisoi
4. Suco Faturasa
5. Suco Hautoho
6. Suco Maumeta
7. Suco Liurai
8. Suco Tulataqueo

=== Ainaro Municipality ===
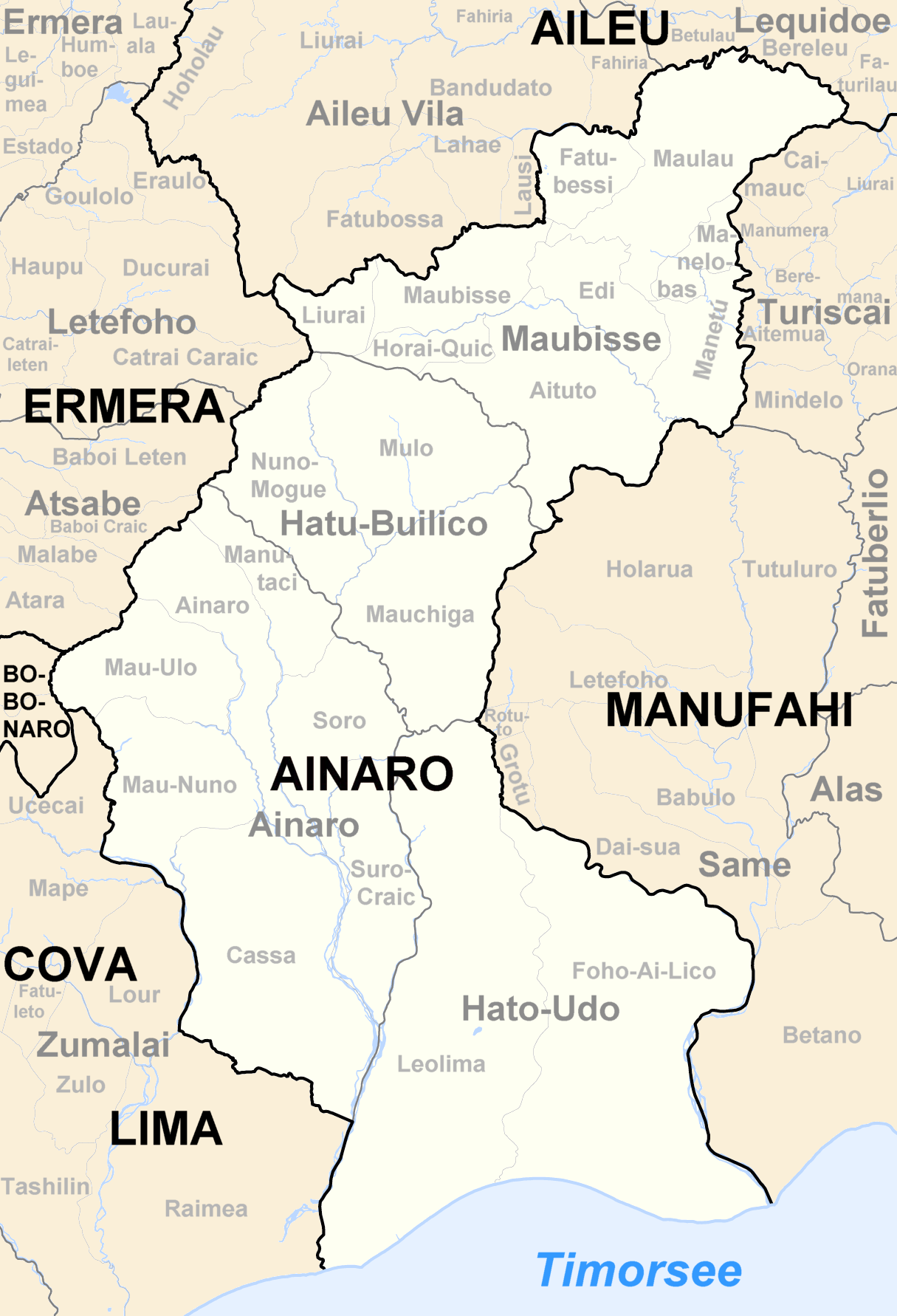
Sucos of Ainaro (borders between 2003 and 2015)

- Ainaro Administrative Post
1. Suco Ainaro
2. Suco Cassa
3. Suco Manutaci
4. Suco Mau-Nuno
5. Suco Mau-Ulo
6. Suco Soro
7. Suco Suro-Craic
- Hatu-Builico Administrative Post
1. Suco Mauchiga
2. Suco Mulo
3. Suco Nuno-Mogue
- Hato-Udo Administrative Post
1. Suco Foho-Ai-Lico
2. Suco Leolima
- Maubisse Administrative Post
1. Suco Aituto
2. Suco Edi
3. Suco Fatubessi
4. Suco Horai-Quic
5. Suco Liurai
6. Suco Manelobas
7. Suco Manetu
8. Suco Maubisse
9. Suco Maulau

=== Atauro Municipality ===
1. Suco Beloi
2. Suco Biqueli
3. Suco Macadade
4. Suco Maquili
5. Suco Vila Maumeta

=== Baucau Municipality ===
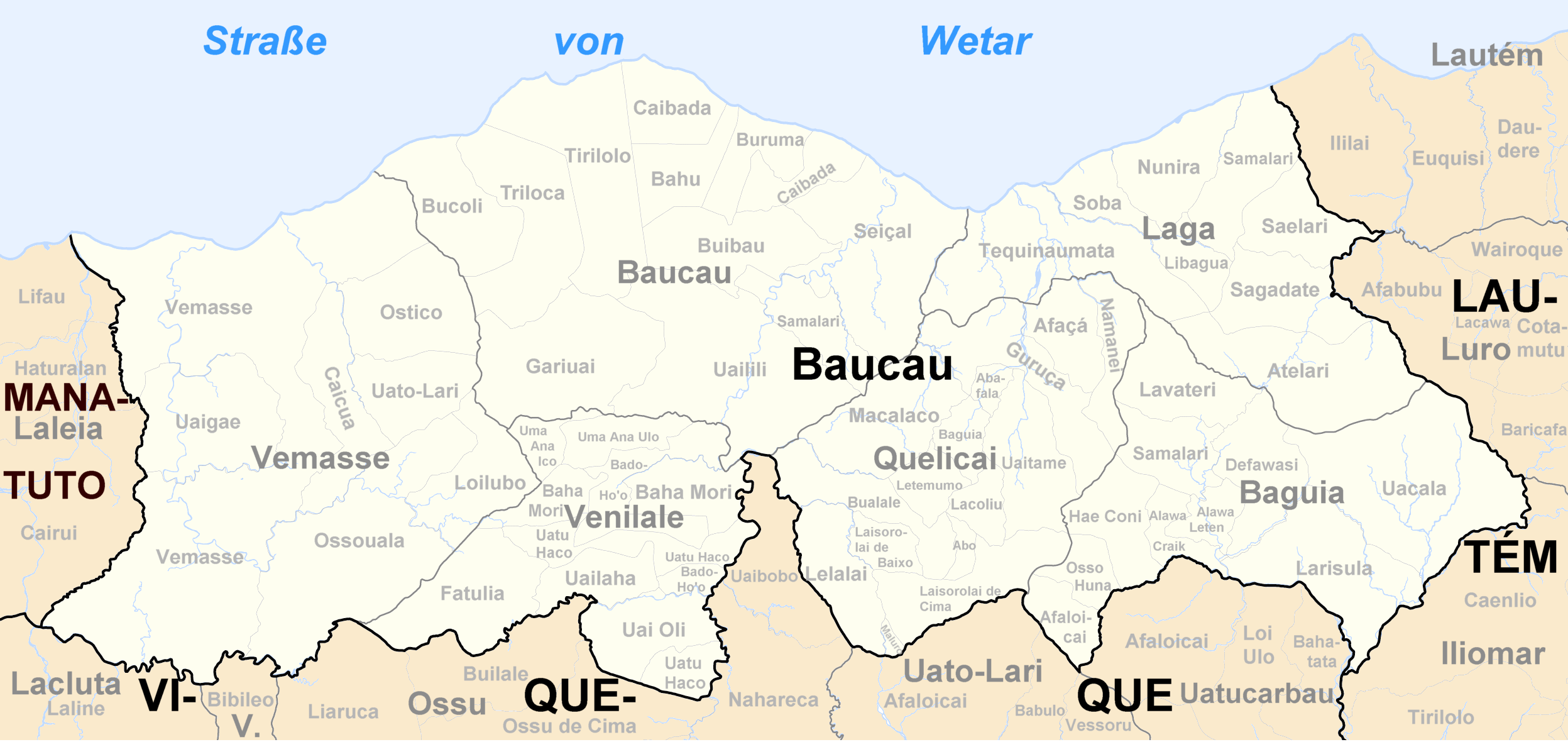
Sucos of Baucau (borders between 2003 and 2015)

- Baguia Administrative Post
1. Suco Afaloicai
2. Suco Alawa Craik
3. Suco Alawa Leten
4. Suco Defawasi
5. Suco Hae Coni
6. Suco Larisula
7. Suco Lavateri
8. Suco Osso Huna
9. Suco Samalari
10. Suco Uacala
- Baucau Administrative Post
1. Suco Bahú
2. Suco Bucoli
3. Suco Buibau
4. Suco Buruma
5. Suco Caibada
6. Suco Gariuai
7. Suco Samalari
8. Suco Seiçal
9. Suco Tirilolo
10. Suco Triloca
11. Suco Uailili
- Laga Administrative Post
1. Suco Atelari
2. Suco Libagua
3. Suco Nunira
4. Suco Saelari
5. Suco Sagadate
6. Suco Samalari
7. Suco Soba
8. Suco Tequinomata
- Matebian Administrative Post
1. Suco Abo
2. Suco Laisorulai de Baixo
3. Suco Laisorulai de Cima
4. Suco Lelalai
5. Suco Maluro
- Quelicai Administrative Post
1. Suco Baguia
2. Suco Bualale
3. Suco Lacolio
4. Suco Letemumo
5. Suco Macalaco
- Quelicai Antigo Administrative Post
1. Suco Abafala
2. Suco Afaçá
3. Suco Guruça
4. Suco Namanei
5. Suco Uaitame
- Vemasse Administrative Post
1. Suco Caicua
2. Suco Loilubo
3. Suco Ossouala
4. Suco Ostico
5. Suco Uaigae
6. Suco Uato-Lari
7. Suco Vemasse
- Venilale Administrative Post
1. Suco Bado-Ho'o
2. Suco Baha Mori
3. Suco Fatulia
4. Suco Uai Oli
5. Suco Uailaha
6. Suco Uatu Haco
7. Suco Uma Ana Ico
8. Suco Uma Ana Ulo

=== Bobonaro Municipality ===
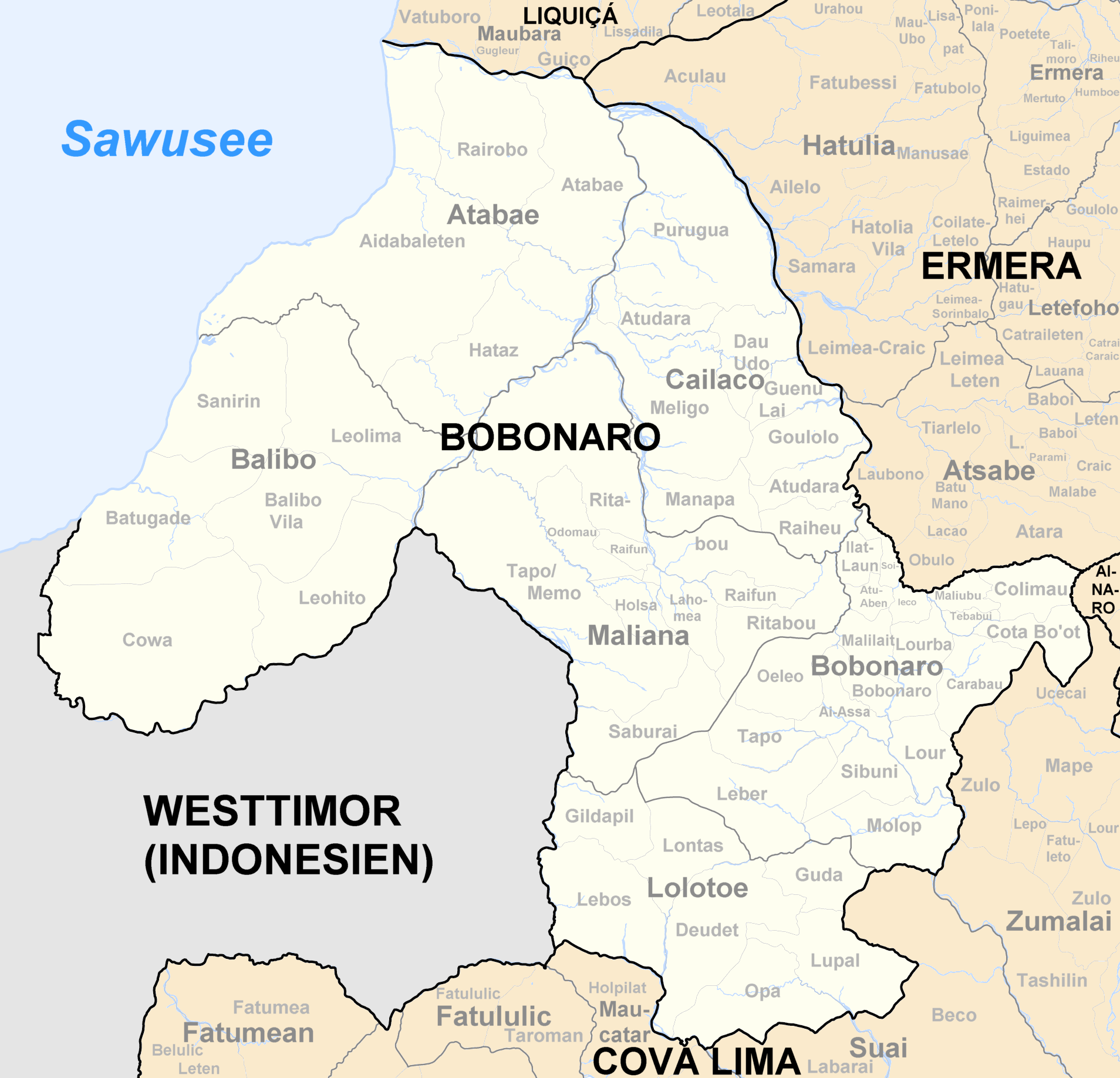
Sucos of Bobonaro (borders between 2003 and 2015)

- Atabae Administrative Post
1. Suco Aidabaleten
2. Suco Atabae
3. Suco Hataz
4. Suco Rairobo
- Balibo Administrative Post
1. Suco Balibo
2. Suco Batugade
3. Suco Cowa
4. Suco Leohito
5. Suco Leolima
6. Suco Sanirin
- Bobonaro Administrative Post
1. Suco Ai-Assa
2. Suco Atu-Aben
3. Suco Bobonaro
4. Suco Carabau
5. Suco Colimau
6. Suco Cota Bo'ot
7. Suco Ilat-Laun
8. Suco Leber
9. Suco Lour
10. Suco Lourba
11. Suco Maliubu
12. Suco Malilait
13. Suco Molop
14. Suco Oeleo
15. Suco Sibuni
16. Suco Soileco
17. Suco Tapo
18. Suco Tebabui
- Cailaco Administrative Post
1. Suco Atudara
2. Suco Dau Udo
3. Suco Goulolo
4. Suco Guenu Lai
5. Suco Manapa
6. Suco Meligo
7. Suco Purugua
8. Suco Raiheu
- Lolotoe Administrative Post
1. Suco Deudet
2. Suco Gildapil
3. Suco Guda
4. Suco Lebos
5. Suco Lontas
6. Suco Lupal
7. Suco Opa
- Maliana Administrative Post
1. Suco Holsa
2. Suco Lahomea
3. Suco Odomau
4. Suco Raifun
5. Suco Ritabou
6. Suco Saburai
7. Suco Tapo/Memo

=== Cova Lima Municipality ===
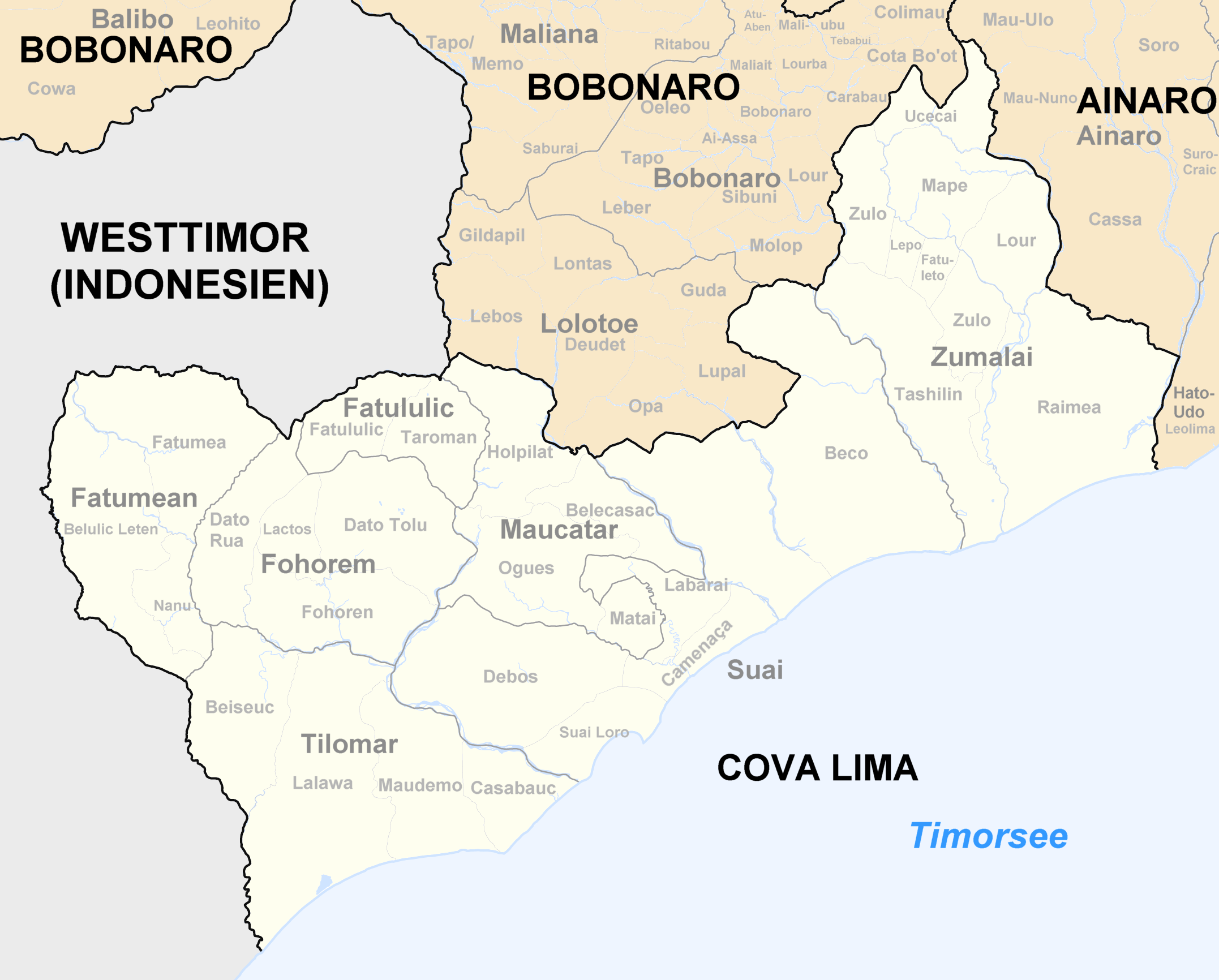
Sucos of Cova Lima (borders between 2003 and 2015)

- Fatululic Administrative Post
1. Suco Fatululic
2. Suco Taroman
- Fatumean Administrative Post
1. Suco Belulic Leten
2. Suco Fatumea
3. Suco Nanu
- Fohorem Administrative Post
1. Suco Dato Rua
2. Suco Dato Tolu
3. Suco Fohoren
4. Suco Lactos
- Zumalai Administrative Post
1. Suco Fatuleto
2. Suco Lepo
3. Suco Lourl
4. Suco Mape
5. Suco Raimea
6. Suco Tashilin
7. Suco Ucecai
8. Suco Zulo
- Maucatar Administrative Post
1. Suco Belecasac
2. Suco Holpilat
3. Suco Matai
4. Suco Ogues
- Suai Administrative Post
1. Suco Beco
2. Suco Camenaça
3. Suco Debos
4. Suco Labarai
5. Suco Suai Loro
- Tilomar Administrative Post
1. Suco Beiseuc
2. Suco Casabauc
3. Suco Lalawa
4. Suco Maudemo

=== Dili Municipality ===
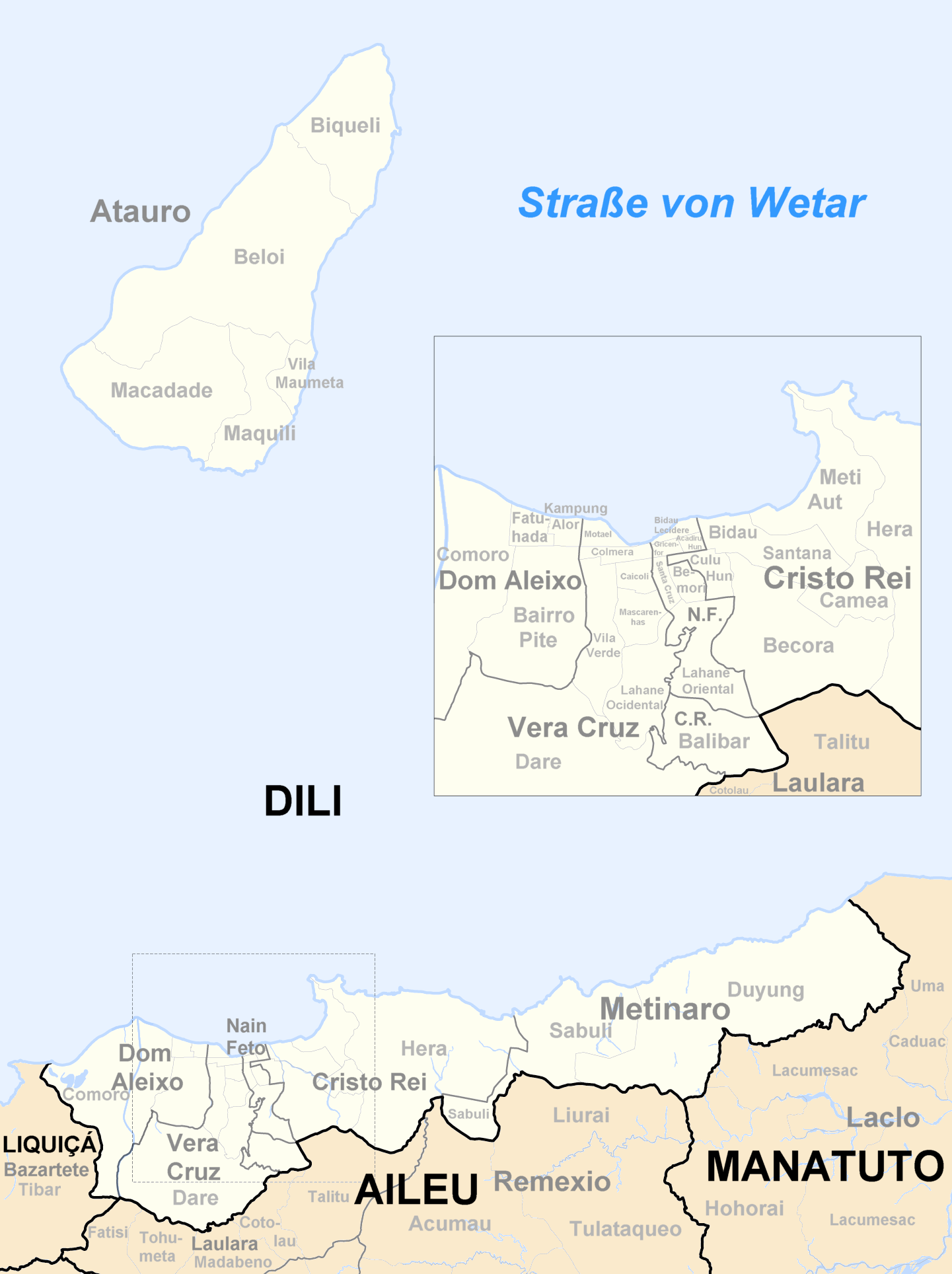
Sucos of Dili (borders between 2003 and 2015)

- Cristo Rei Administrative Post
1. Suco Ailoc
2. Suco Balibar
3. Suco Becora
4. Suco Bidau Santana
5. Suco Camea
6. Suco Culuhun
7. Suco Hera
8. Suco Metiaut
- Dom Aleixo Administrative Post
1. Suco Bairro Pite
2. Suco Bebonuk
3. Suco Comoro
4. Suco Fatuhada
5. Suco Kampung Alor
6. Suco Madohi
7. Suco Manleuana
- Metinaro Administrative Post
1. Suco Duyung
2. Suco Sabuli
- Nain Feto Administrative Post
1. Suco Akadiruhun
2. Suco Bemori
3. Suco Bidau
4. Suco Lecidere
5. Suco Gricenfor (merger of former sucos of Bairro Central, Bairro dos Grilhos and Bairro Formosa)
6. Suco Lahane Oriental
7. Suco Santa Cruz
- Vera Cruz Administrative Post
1. Suco Caicoli
2. Suco Colmera
3. Suco Dare
4. Suco Lahane Ocidental
5. Suco Mascarenhas
6. Suco Motael
7. Suco Vila Verde

=== Ermera Municipality ===
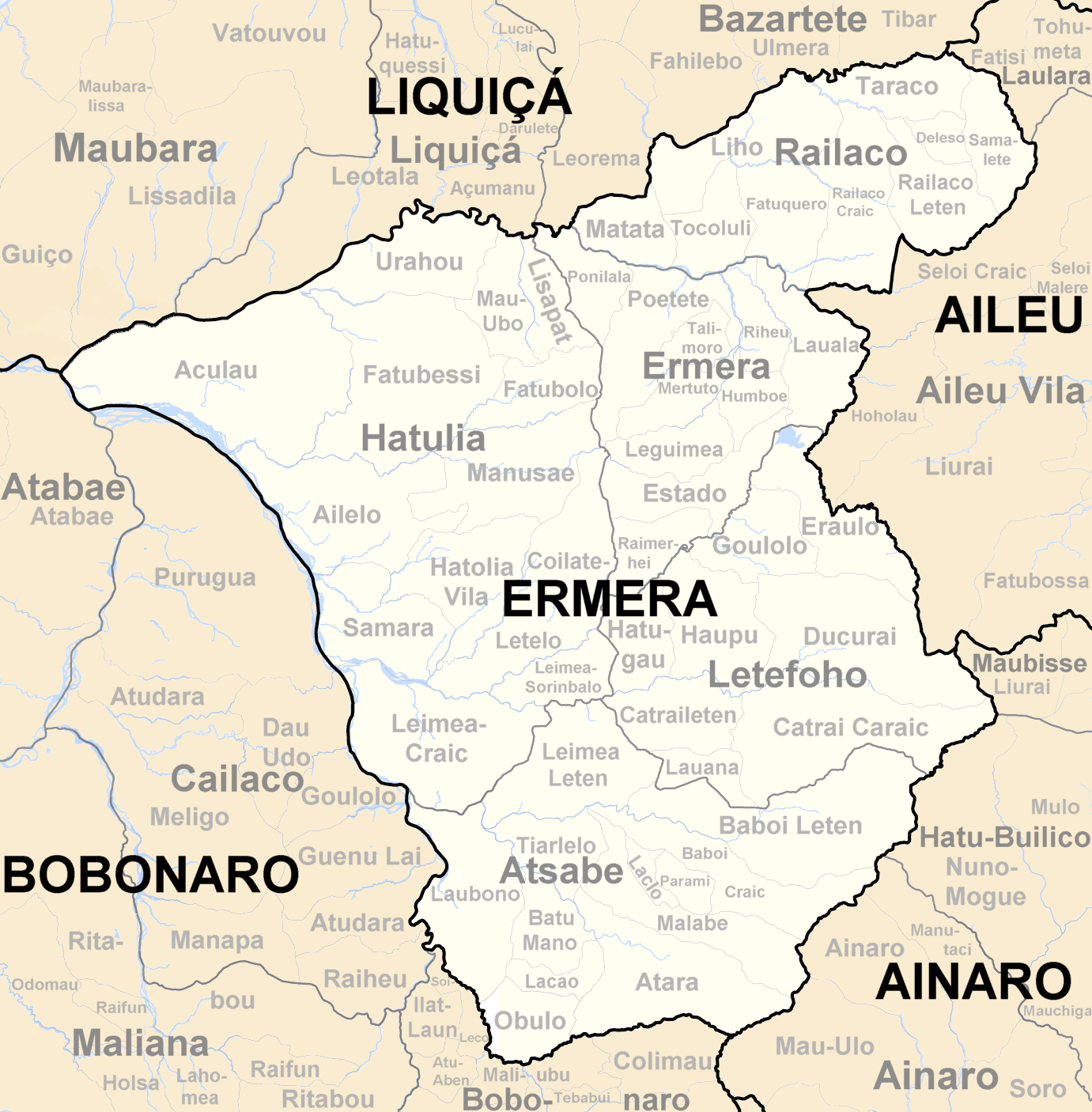
Sucos of Ermera (borders between 2003 and 2015)

- Atsabe Administrative Post
1. Suco Atara
2. Suco Baboe Kraik
3. Suco Baboe Leten
4. Suco Batu Manu
5. Suco Laklo
6. Suco Lasaun
7. Suco Laubonu
8. Suco Leimea Leten
9. Suco Malabe
10. Suco Obulo
11. Suco Parami
12. Suco Tiarlelo
- Ermera Administrative Post
1. Suco Estado
2. Suco Humboe
3. Suco Lauala
4. Suco Liguimea
5. Suco Mertutu
6. Suco Poetete
7. Suco Ponilala
8. Suco Raimerhei
9. Suco Riheu
10. Suco Talimoro
- Hatulia Administrative Post
1. Suco Ailelo
2. Suco Asulau/Sare
3. Suco Fatubalu
4. Suco Fatubessi
5. Suco Hatulia
6. Suco Kailete Leotela
7. Suco Leimea Kraik
8. Suco Leimea Sarinbala
9. Suco Lisabat
10. Suco Manusea
11. Suco Mauabu
12. Suco Samara
13. Suco Uruhau
- Letefoho Administrative Post
1. Suco Dukurai
2. Suco Eraulo
3. Suco Goulolo
4. Suco Hatugau
5. Suco Katrai Kraik
6. Suco Katrai Leten
7. Suco Lauana
8. Suco Letefoho
- Railaco Administrative Post
1. Suco Fatuquero
2. Suco Liho
3. Suco Matata
4. Suco Oeleso
5. Suco Railaco Kraik
6. Suco Railako Leten
7. Suco Samaleten
8. Suco Taraso
9. Suco Tokoluli

=== Lautém Municipality ===
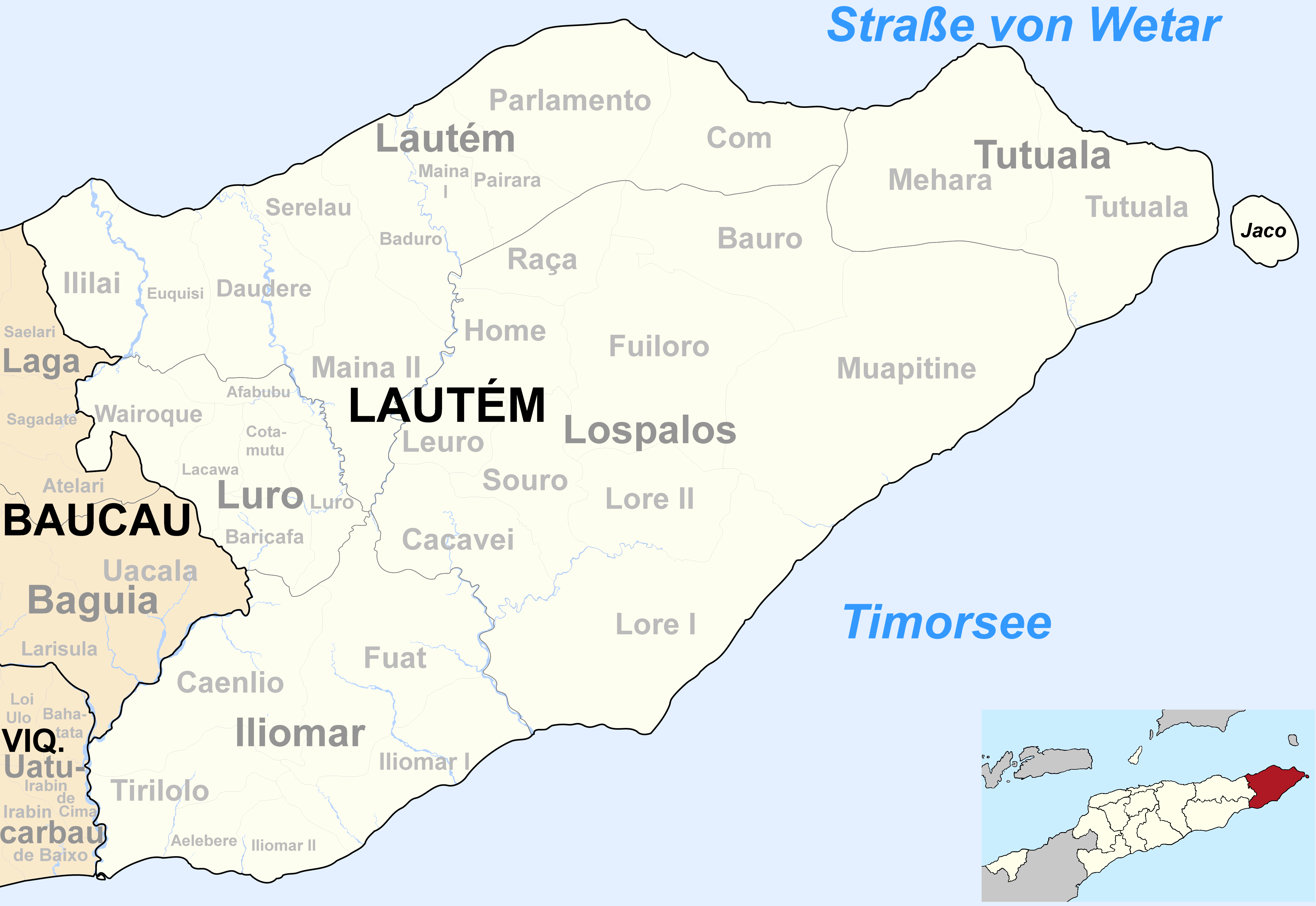
Sucos of Lautém

- Iliomar Administrative Post
1. Suco Iliomar I
2. Suco Iliomar II
3. Suco Ailebere
4. Suco Fuat
5. Suco Cainliu
6. Suco Tirilolo
- Lautém Administrative Post
1. Suco Baduro
2. Suco Com
3. Suco Daudere
4. Suco Eukisi
5. Suco Ililai
6. Suco Maina I
7. Suco Maina II
8. Suco Pairara
9. Suco Parlamento
10. Suco Serelau
- Lospalos Administrative Post
1. Suco Bauro
2. Suco Cacavei
3. Suco Fuiloro
4. Suco Home
5. Suco Leuro
6. Suco Loré I
7. Suco Loré II
8. Suco Muapitine
9. Suco Raça
10. Suco Souro
- Luro Administrative Post
1. Suco Afabubu
2. Suco Baricafa
3. Suco Cotamuto
4. Suco Lakawa
5. Suco Luro
6. Suco Wairoke
- Tutuala Administrative Post
1. Suco Mehara
2. Suco Tutuala

=== Liquiçá Municipality ===
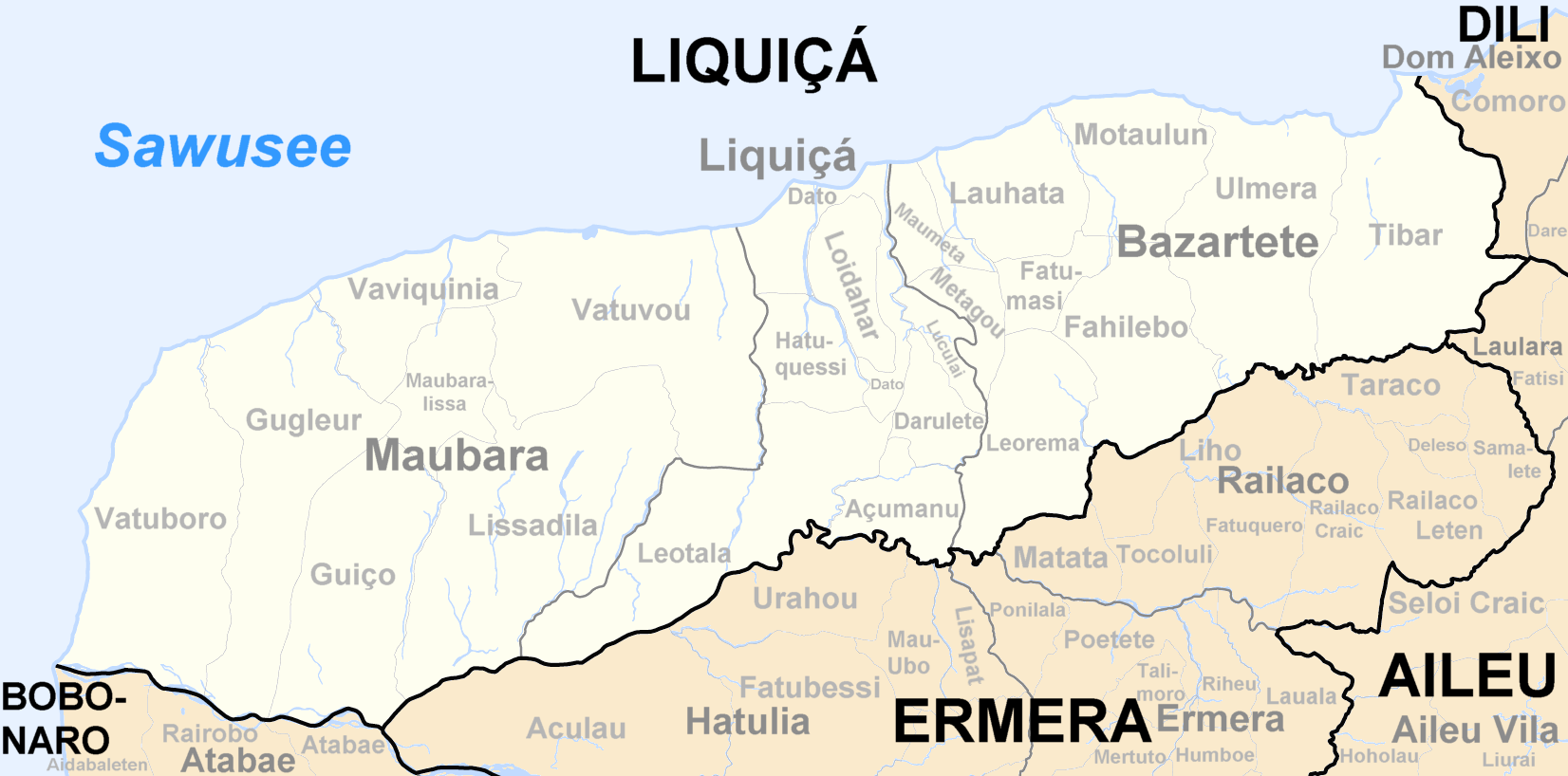
Sucos of Liquiçá (borders between 2003 and 2015)

- Bazartete Administrative Post
1. Suco Fahilebo
2. Suco Fatumasi
3. Suco Lauhata
4. Suco Leorema
5. Suco Maumeta
6. Suco Metagou
7. Suco Motaulun
8. Suco Tibar
9. Suco Ulmera
- Liquiçá Administrative Post
1. Suco Asumano
2. Suco Darulete
3. Suco Dato
4. Suco Hatukesi
5. Suco Leotela
6. Suco Loidahar
7. Suco Lukulai
- Maubara Administrative Post
1. Suco Guguleur
2. Suco Guico
3. Suco Lisadilia
4. Suco Maubaralisa
5. Suco Vatuboro
6. Suco Vatuvou
7. Suco Vaviquinia

=== Manatuto Municipality ===
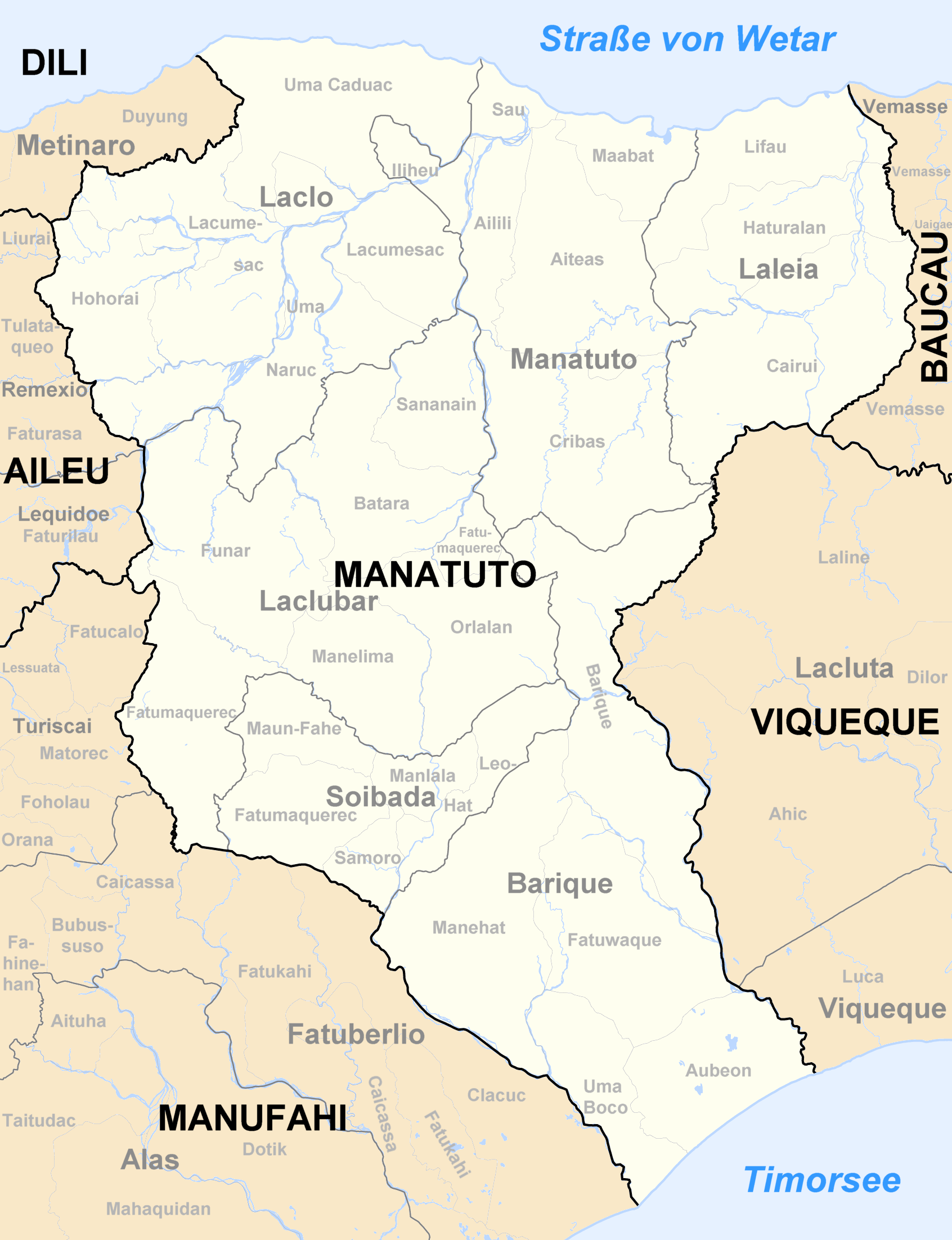
Sucos of Manatuto (borders between 2003 and 2015)

- Barique Administrative Post
1. Suco Aubeon
2. Suco Barique
3. Suco Fatuwaqui
4. Suco Manehat
5. Suco Sikone-Diloli
6. Suco Umaboku
- Laclo Administrative Post
1. Suco Hohorai
2. Suco Licore
3. Suco Lacumesac
4. Suco Uma Caduac
5. Suco Uma Naruc
- Laclubar Administrative Post
1. Suco Batara
2. Suco Fatumakerek
3. Suco Funar
4. Suco Manelima
5. Suco Orlalan
6. Suco Sananain
- Laleia Subdistrict
1. Suco Cairui
2. Suco Hatularan
3. Suco Lifau
- Manatuto Administrative Post
1. Suco Ailili
2. Suco Aiteas
3. Suco Cribas
4. Suco Iliheu
5. Suco Maabat
6. Suco Sau
- Soibada Administrative Post
1. Suco Fatumakerek
2. Suco Leohat
3. Suco Manlala
4. Suco Maunfahe
5. Suco Samoro

=== Manufahi Municipality ===
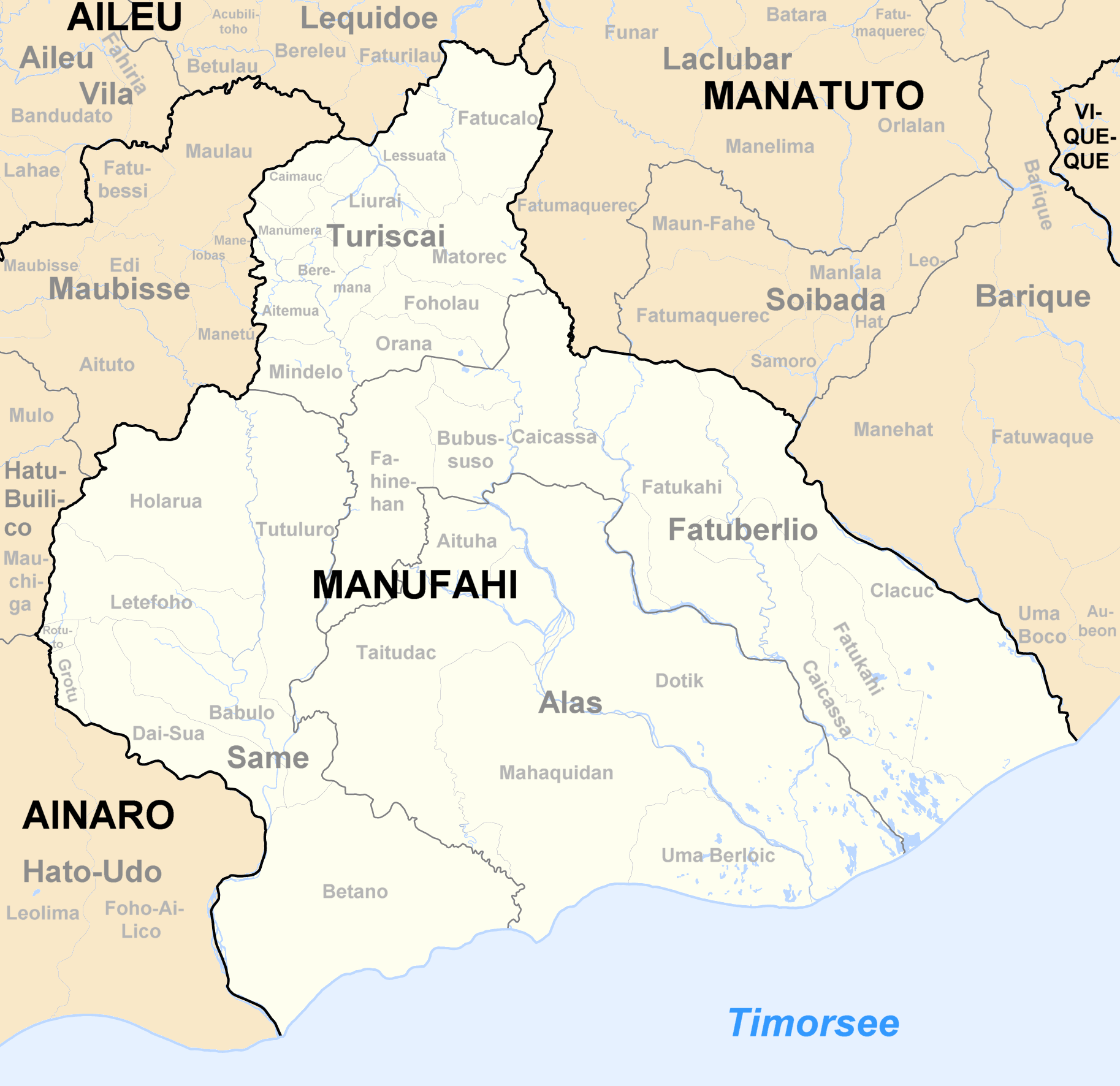
Sucos of Manufahi (borders between 2003 and 2015)

- Alas Administrative Post
1. Suco Aituha
2. Suco Dotik
3. Suco Malagidan
4. Suco Taitudal
5. Suco Uma Berloik
- Fatuberliu Administrative Post
1. Suco Bubususu
2. Suco Fatukahi
3. Suco Kaikasa
4. Suco Klakuk
5. Suco Talinehar
- Same Administrative Post
1. Suco Babulo
2. Suco Betano
3. Suco Daisula
4. Suco Gratu
5. Suco Holarua
6. Suco Letefoho
7. Suco Rotutu
8. Suco Tutuluro
- Turiscai Administrative Post
1. Suco Aitenua
2. Suco Beremana
3. Suco Fatukalo
4. Suco Kaimauk
5. Suco Foholau
6. Suco Lesuata
7. Suco Liurai
8. Suco Manumera
9. Suco Matorek
10. Suco Mindelo
11. Suco Orana

=== Oecusse (Special Administrative Region Oecusse-Ambeno) ===
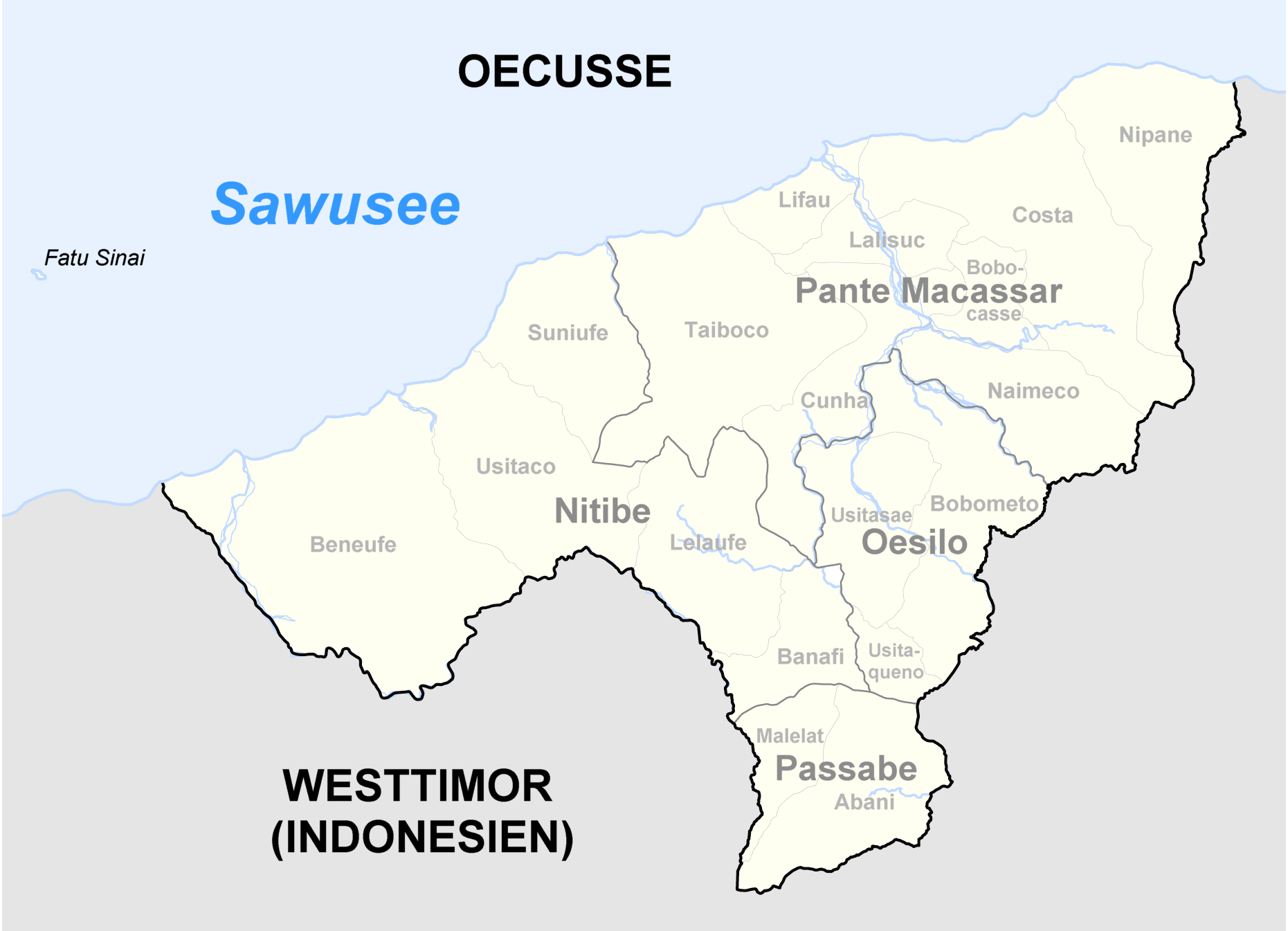
Sucos of Oecussi-Ambeno (borders between 2003 and 2015)

- Nitibe Administrative Post
1. Suco Banafi
2. Suco Bebe Ufe
3. Suco Lela Ufe
4. Suco Suni Ufe
5. Suco Usi Taco
- Oesilo Administrative Post
1. Suco Bobometo
2. Suco Usitakeno
3. Suco Usitasae
- Pante Macassar Administrative Post
1. Suco Bobocasae
2. Suco Costa
3. Suco Cunha
4. Suco Lalisuk
5. Suco Lifau
6. Suco Naimeco
7. Suco Nipane
8. Suco Taiboco
- Passabe Administrative Post
1. Suco Abani
2. Suco Malelat

=== Viqueque Municipality ===
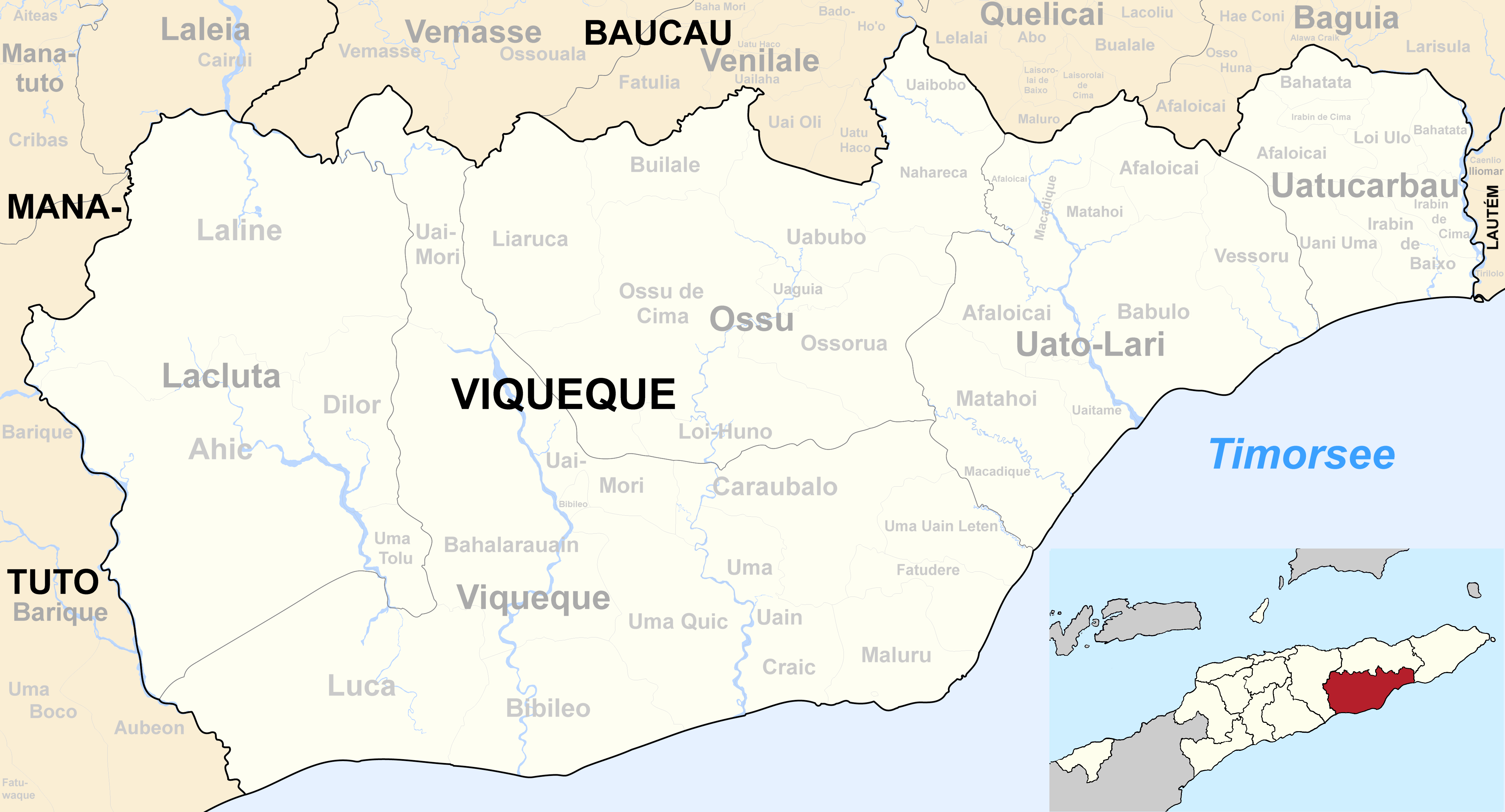
Sucos of Viqueque

- Lacluta Administrative Post
1. Suco Ahic
2. Suco Dilor
3. Suco Laline
4. Suco Uma Tolu
- Ossu Administrative Post
1. Suco Builale
2. Suco Builo
3. Suco Liaruca
4. Suco Loi-Huno
5. Suco Nahareca
6. Suco Ossorua
7. Suco Ossu de Cima
8. Suco Uabubo
9. Suco Uaguia
10. Suco Uaibobo
- Uato-Lari Administrative Post
1. Suco Afaloicai
2. Suco Babulo
3. Suco Macadique
4. Suco Matohoi
5. Suco Uaitame
6. Suco Vessoru
- Uatucarbau Administrative Post
1. Suco Afaloicai
2. Suco Bahatata
3. Suco Irabin de Baixo
4. Suco Irabin de Cima
5. Suco Loi Ulu
6. Suco Uani Uma
- Viqueque Administrative Post
1. Suco Bahalarauain
2. Suco Bibileo
3. Suco Caraubalu
4. Suco Fatu Dere
5. Suco Luca
6. Suco Maluru
7. Suco Uaimori
8. Suco Uma Qui'ic
9. Suco Uma Uain Craic
10. Suco Uma Uain Leten

== See also ==
- Municipalities of Timor-Leste
- Administrative posts of Timor-Leste

== Sources ==
- Geographic Maps of UNMIT
