= Fuad =

Fouad
- Pronunciation: Arabic: [fuːʔ.aːd]
- Gender: Masculine

Origin
- Origin: Arabic
- Meaning: "heart"

Other names
- Related names: Fouad, Fuat, Fawad, Foaad, Fuaad

Fuad (Arabic: َفؤَاد fū’ād, fou’ād) (also spelled Fouad, Foud, Fuaad or Foad) is a masculine Arabic given name, meaning "heart"—the beating circulating heart, the concept of "mind and spirit".

Its root word is the Arabic verb fa’ada (Arabic: َفَأَد), meaning "burning or a flame", and lahmun fa'eed, meaning a "roasted meat on a fire". It is used to describe a "heart that is inflamed with emotion". Therefore, it may share similarities with another Arabic verb fada’ (َفَدَى) meaning "to sacrifice"—"to sacrifice, give, risk oneself for (something/cause)".

It was borne by two different kings of Egypt.

Originally an Arabic given name, it became widespread throughout the Middle East during the 9th and 12th centuries.

== Notable people ==
=== Art ===
- Fuad Abdurahmanov (1915–1971), Azerbaijani sculptor
- Fuad (Fred) J. Maroon
- Fuad Salayev (born 1943), Azerbaijani sculptor

=== Clergy ===
- Fouad Twal (born 1940), Latin Patriarch of Jerusalem

=== Education ===
- Fouad Ajami (1945–2014), Lebanese-born American university professor

=== Entertainment ===
- Fouad el-Mohandes (1924–2006), Egyptian stage and screen actor
- Fouad Awad (born 1956), Palestinian theatre director

=== Music ===
- Fuat Mansurov (1928–2010), Russian conductor
- Fuad al Muqtadir (born 1980), Bangladeshi composer and singer

=== Nobility ===
- Fuad I of Egypt (1868–1936), known as Fuad I, king of Egypt and Sudan
- Fuad II of Egypt (born 1952), king of Egypt and Sudan

=== Politics ===
- Fouad Chehab (1902–1973), Lebanese general and statesman, Lebanese president (1958–1964)
- Fuad Guliyev (born 1941), Azerbaijani politician
- Fuad Hamza (1899–1951), Saudi Arabian government official
- Fuad Hassan (1929–2007), Indonesian politician
- Fuad Masum (born 1938), Iraqi president
- Fouad Mebazaa (1933–2025), Tunisian politician, President of Tunisia in 2011
- Fouad Najjar (1930–1992), Lebanese agronomist and politician
- Fuad Noman (1947–2025), Brazilian writer, economist, and politician
- Fuad Rouhani (1907–2004), Iranian politician
- Fuad Saba (1902–1984), Palestinian businessman and politician
- Fouad Siniora (born 1943), Lebanese politician
- Fouad Siyadi (born 1955), Bahraini politician
- Fuad Stephens (birth name Donald Stephens) (1920–1976), 1st Chief Minister of Sabah
- Fuad Yakubovsky (1908–1975), Soviet Communist party functionary and statesman
- Binyamin Fuad Ben Eliezer (1936–2016), Israeli politician of Iraqi Jewish descent

=== Sports ===
- Fawad Alam (born 1985), Pakistani cricketer
- Fouad Bachirou (born 1990), French footballer
- Fuad Anwar (born 1972), Saudi Arabian footballer
- Fuad Aslanov (born 1976), Azerbaijani boxer
- Fuad Ibrahim, (born 1991) Ethiopian-born American soccer player
- Fuad Muzurović (born 1945), Bosnian football manager
- Fuad Reveiz (born 1963), Colombian-American football placekicker

=== Crime ===
- Fouad Lakhlili, 2023 Rotterdam shootings perpetrator

== Places ==
- Port Fuad, Egypt

== Fictional characters ==
- Fouad, a fictional character from the FOX television series Family Guy.

== In popular culture ==
- L.G. FUAD, song by American rock band Motion City Soundtrack

== Statistics ==
The name is mentioned five times in the Quran.

== See also ==
- Port Fuad
- Fouad (disambiguation) Includes people with surname "Fouad"
