= Funar =

Coordinates: 8.7506°S 125.8687°E

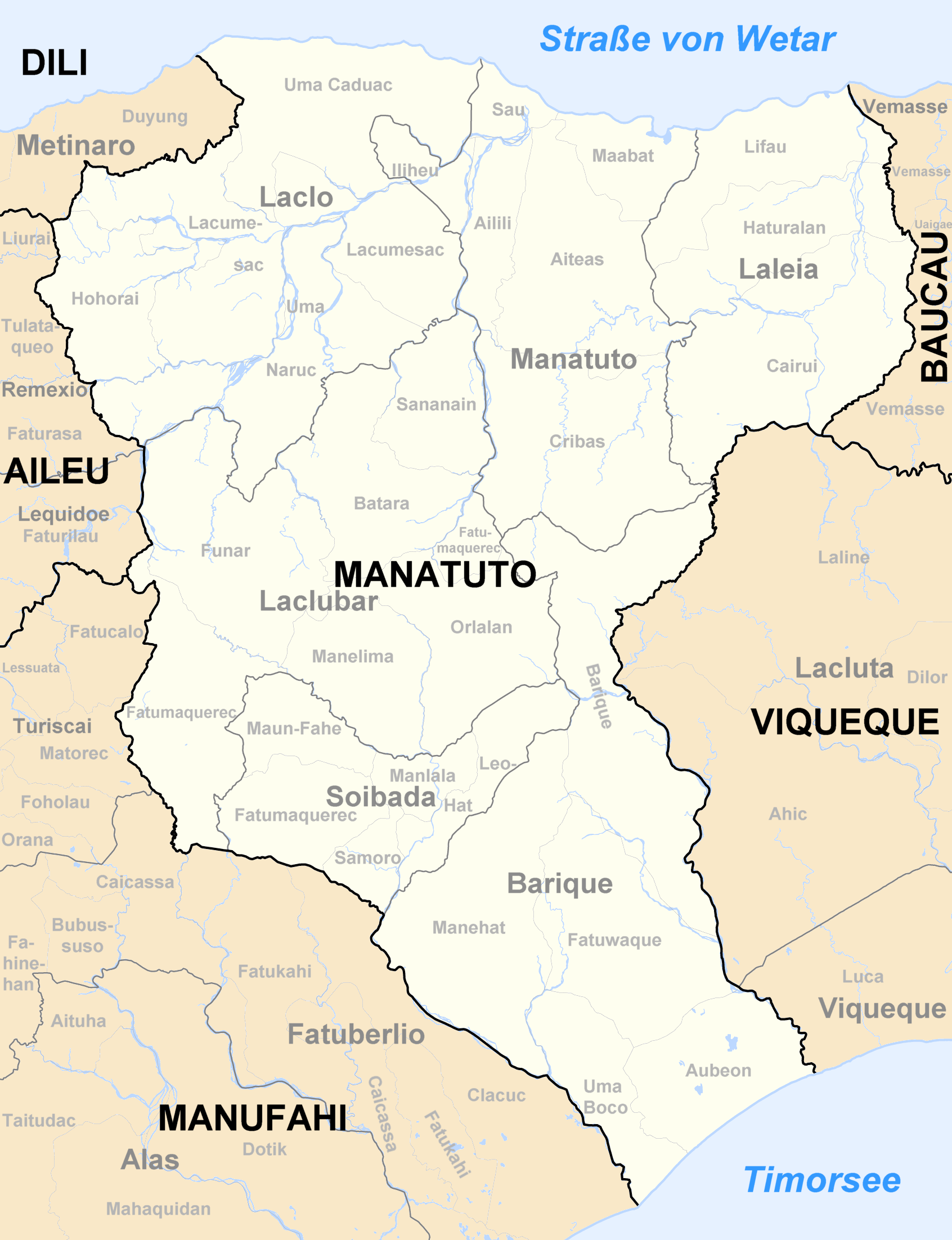
Map of Manatuto district

Funar is a suco in the northwest of Laclubar subdistrict (Manatuto District, Timor-Leste). It has 1790 inhabitants (census 2010) and an area of 91.55 km^{2}.
