= Laclubar =

Laclubar is the main locality in Laclubar Administrative Post, Manatuto Municipality, Timor-Leste.
