= Laclubar Administrative Post =

Administrative post in Manatuto Municipality, Timor-Leste

Laclubar
- Administrative Post
- Posto Administrativo de Laclubar (Portuguese); Postu administrativu Laklubar (Tetum)
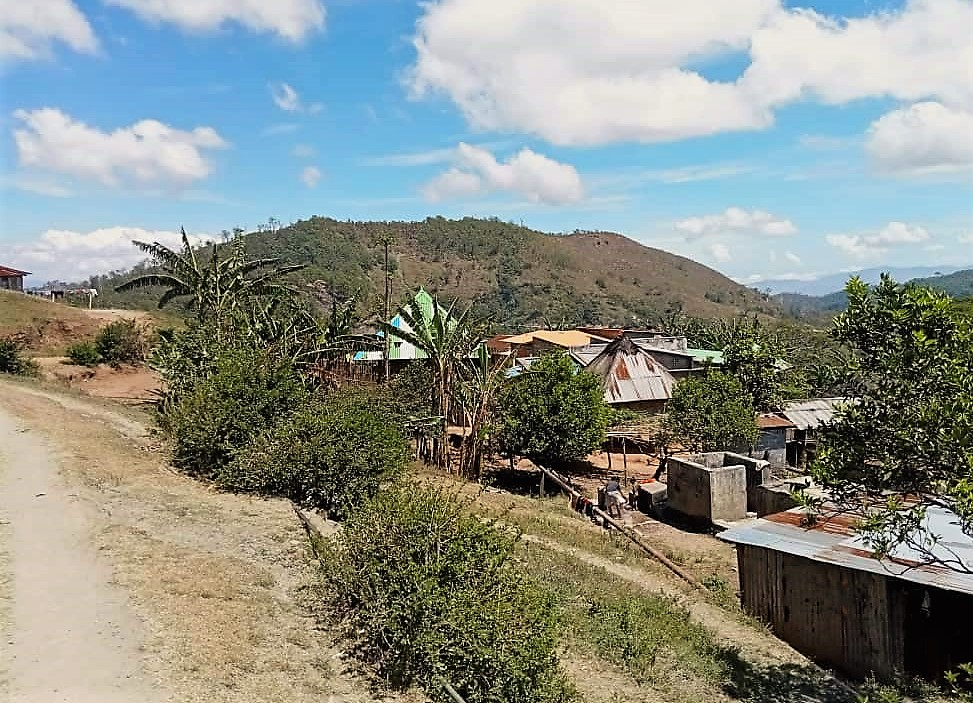
- Manelima, Laclubar

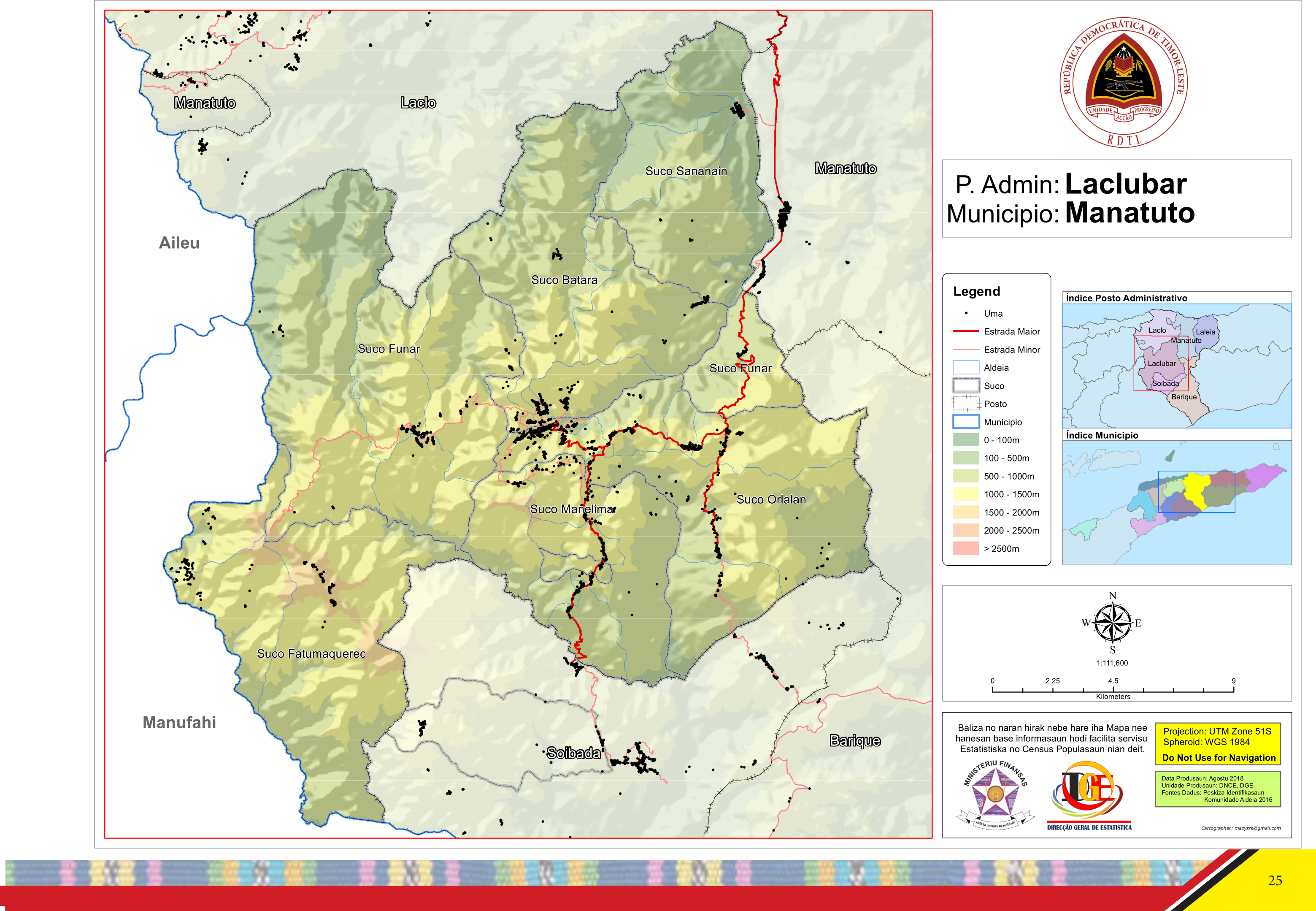
- Official map

- Location within East Timor
- Coordinates: 8°45′S 125°55′E
- Country: Timor-Leste
- Municipality: Manatuto
- Seat: Orlalan
- Sucos: Batara; Fatumaquerec; Funar; Manelima; Orlalan; Sananain

Area
  - Total: 399.8 km^{2} (154.4 sq mi)

Population (2015 census)
  - Total: 12,050
  - Density: 30.14/km^{2} (78.06/sq mi)

Households (2015 census)
  - Total: 1,774
- Time zone: UTC+09:00 (TLT)

Laclubar, officially Laclubar Administrative Post (Portuguese: Posto Administrativo de Laclubar, Tetum: Postu administrativu Laklubar), is an administrative post (and was formerly a subdistrict) in Manatuto municipality, Timor-Leste. Its seat or administrative centre is Orlalan.
