= Ulurapa =

Mountain in Timor-Leste

Ulurapa is the name of a mountain in Cacavei village, Lospalos, Lautem, Timor Leste.
