= Fouad =

Fouad may refer to:

== People with the single name ==
- Fuad I of Egypt (1868-1936), also spelled Fouad, sultan and later king of Egypt
- Fuad II of Egypt (born 1952), deposed infant king of Egypt

=== Fictional characters ===
- Fouad (Family Guy), character in American animated comedy series

== People with the surname ==
- Amina Fouad (born 1980), Egyptian volleyball player
- Ceet Fouad (born 1971), Algerian muralist
- Hala Fouad (1958-1992), Egyptian film and TV actress
- Mohamed Fouad (born 1961), Egyptian singer and actor
- Muharram Fouad (1934-2002), Egyptian singer and film star
- Nagwa Fouad (born 1943), Egyptian-Palestinian belly-dancer
- Yasmine Fouad, Egyptian politician
- Tamino-Amir Moharam Fouad (born 1996), Belgian-Egyptian singer and model, grandson of Egyptian singer Muharram Fouad

== People with the given name ==
- Fouad (given name), includes list of holders of the name Fouad or Fuad

== See also ==
- Includes people with the given name
