= Fuat =

Fuat is a masculine Turkish given name and the Turkish spelling of the Arabic name Fuad (Arabic: فؤَاد fū’ād, fou’ād) meaning "heart".

Notable people named Fuat include:

- Fuat Çapa (born 1968), Belgian-Turkish football manager
- Fuat Doğu (1914–2004), Turkish military officer
- Fuat Güner (born 1948), Turkish pop-rock music singer of Mazhar-Fuat-Özkan trio
- Fuat Kalkan (born 1988), German-Turkish footballer
- Fuat Oktay (born 1964), Former Vice President of Turkey
- Fuat Saka (born 1952), Turkish singer
- Fuat Sezgin (1924–2018), Turkish writer
- Fuat Uzkınay (1888–1956), Turkish filmmaker
- Fuat Yaman (born 1958), Turkish football coach
- Mehmet Fuat Köprülü (1890–1966), Ottoman-Turkish politician
