= Luro Administrative Post =

Administrative post in Lautém Municipality, Timor-Leste

Luro
- Administrative Post
- Posto Administrativo de Luro (Portuguese); Postu administrativu Luru (Tetum)
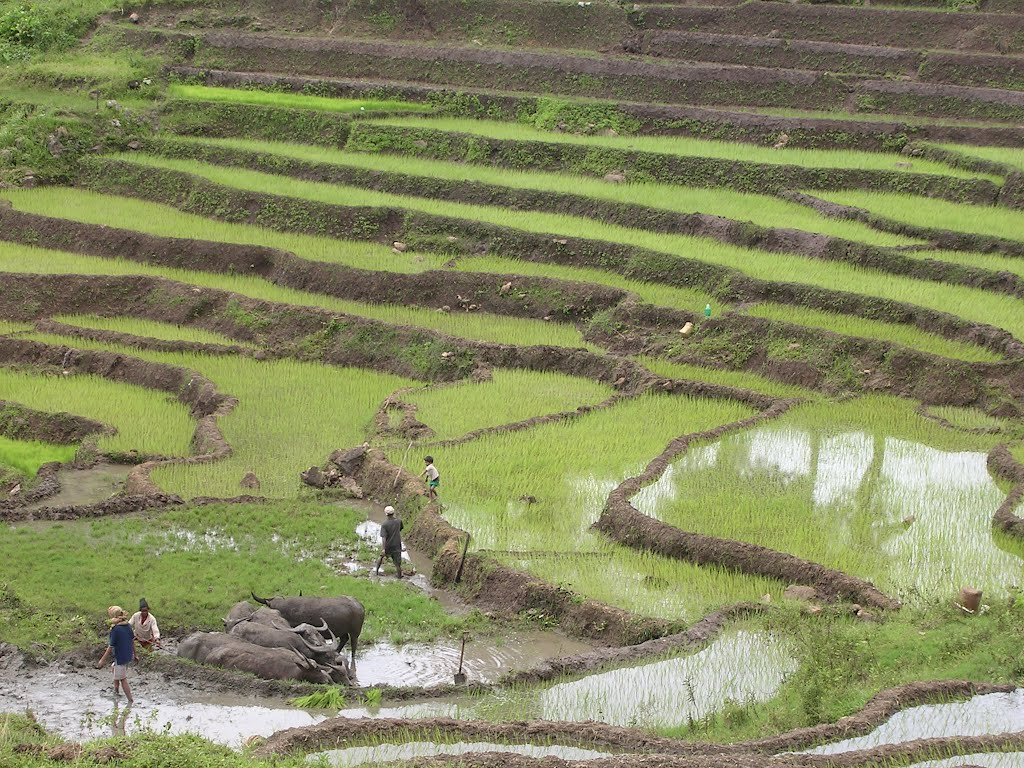
- Rice terraces and water buffalo near Luro

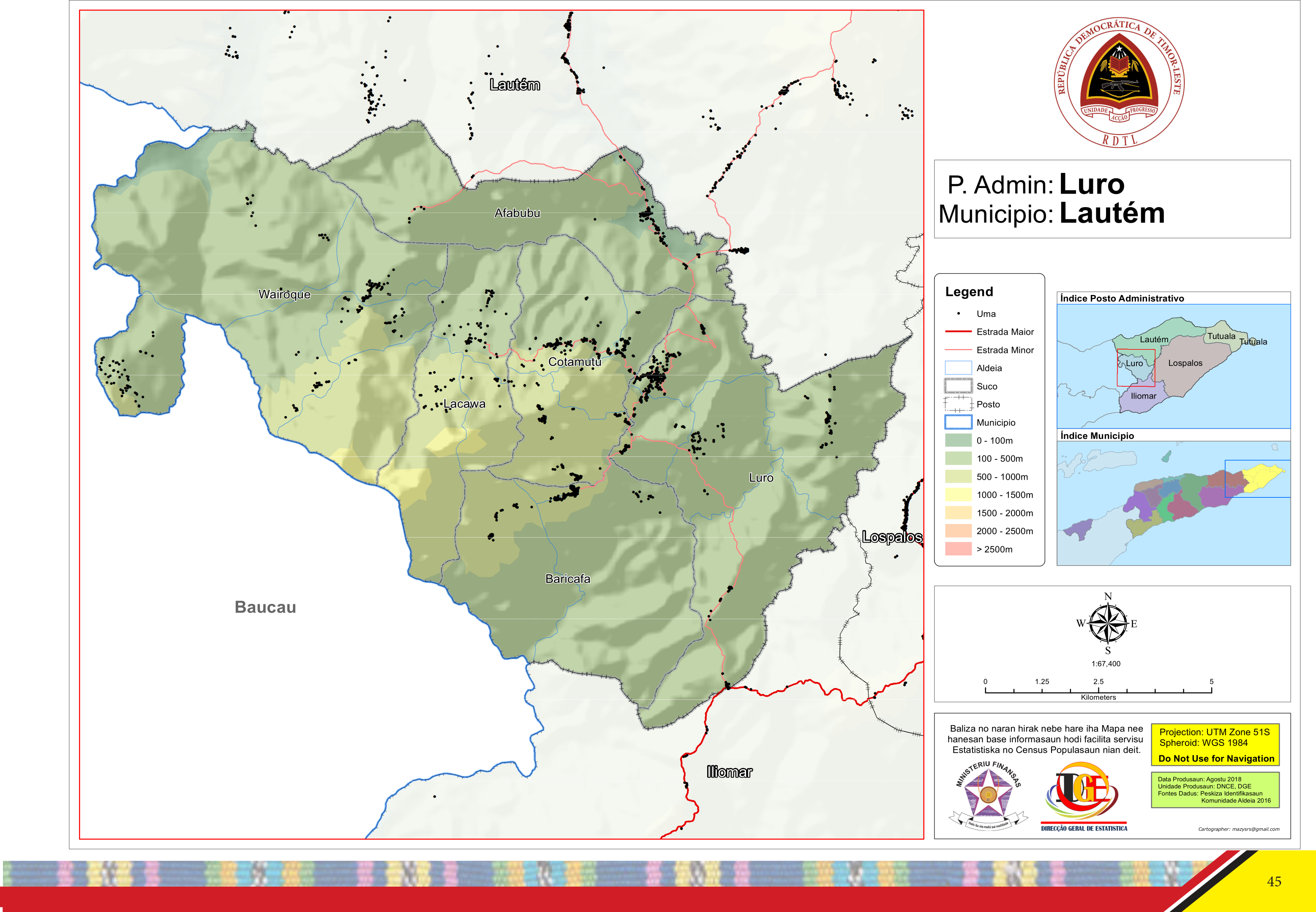
- Official map

- Location within East Timor
- Coordinates: 8°33′S 126°50′E
- Country: Timor-Leste
- Municipality: Lautém
- Seat: Upper Luro
- Sucos: Afabubu; Baricafa; Cotamutu; Lacawa; Luro; Wairoque

Area
  - Total: 125.4 km^{2} (48.4 sq mi)

Population (2015 census)
  - Total: 7,124
  - Density: 56.81/km^{2} (147.1/sq mi)

Households (2015 census)
  - Total: 1,314
- Time zone: UTC+09:00 (TLT)

Luro, officially Luro Administrative Post (Portuguese: Posto Administrativo de Luro, Tetum: Postu administrativu Luru), is an administrative post (and was formerly a subdistrict) in Lautém municipality, Timor-Leste; Luro is also the name of two of its towns (Upper and Lower Luro).

The main river of the administrative post is the Adafuro, running between Wairoque and Cotamutu and through Afabubu. Principal crops grown in the subdistrict include corn, rice, coconuts, cassava and other vegetables.

== History ==
In June 2001 there were severe floods in East Timor, which affected the Luro area. At the end of August 2011, four people died in a clash between two martial arts groups in Baricafa. As a result, Prime Minister Xanana Gusmão ordered the closure of the martial arts clubs.

== Geography ==
Luro is situated in eastern Timor-Leste in Lautém Municipality. The district covers an area of 125.4 square kilometres (48.4 sq mi) and as of 2015 it had a population of 7,124 people. Luro lies in a valley surrounded by hills and smaller mountains. Legumau (Legumaw, Apara) in the Suco of Lacawa is the highest point in the area at 1,228 metres (4,029 ft) (other sources also state 1221 m and 1297 m).

Rivers include the Adafuro, which flows between Wairoque and Cotamutu and through Afabubu, the Bocilliu, which flows through the western part of Afabubu, the Roumoco near the eastern border of Luro, and the Letana in the southern part of Baricata.

=== Sucos ===
The area is divided administratively into the following sucos. Population as of 2015 is given:

- Barikafa (Barikafa) (1013)
- Kotamutu (Kotamuto, Kotamuto) (1983)
- Luro (2233)
- Afabubu (Afabubo) (439)
- Lacawa (Lakawa) (645)
- Wairoque (Wairoke, Wairoce, Vairoque) (811)

== Economy ==
The administrative post has around 1000 hectares of arable land where rice and corn are grown. 60% of households in Luro grow corn, 54% rice, 51% coconuts, 51% cassava, 44% vegetables and 6% coffee, though many people are dependent on the yields of their gardens. Livestock include water buffalos, cattle, sheep, goats, pigs and especially chickens. In Upper-Luro there are a large number of ducks.

== Politics ==
The administrator of the Administrative Post is appointed by the central government in Dili. The politician Jacob Xavier was administrator for Luros for four years in the 1960s. The last administrator appointed by the Portuguese was Jaime Camacho Amaral who served from 1974 to 1975. In 2015 Cecílio Soares the administrator of Luros.
