= Fuat Saka =

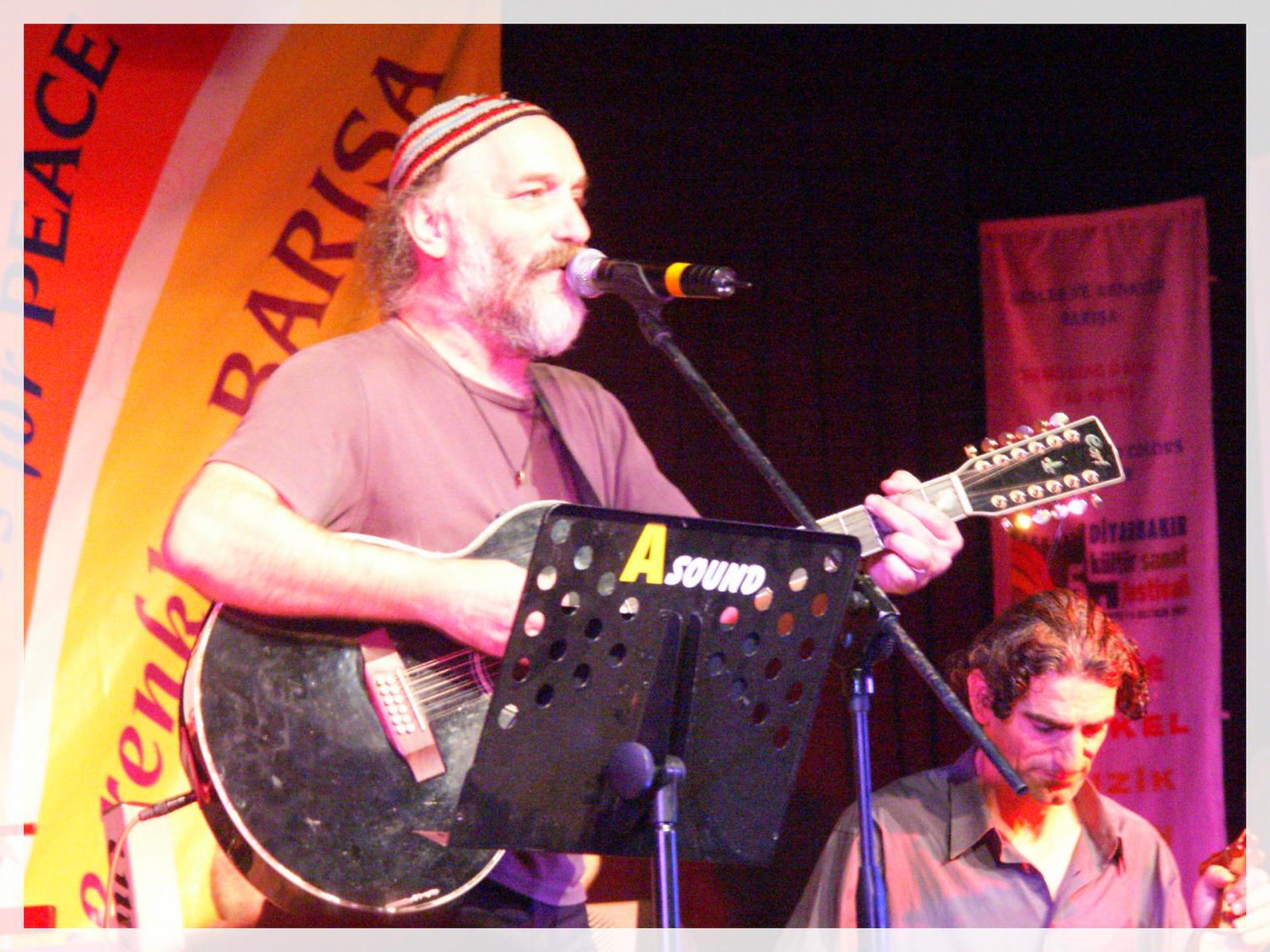
- Fuat Saka at the Diyarbakır Culture-Art Festival

Background information
- Born: 1952 (age 72–73); Trabzon, Turkey
- Genres: Folk
- Occupation(s): Singer, songwriter, arranger, multi-instrumentalist
- Instrument: Guitar
- Years active: 1980–present

Fuat Saka (born 1952) is a Turkish singer, songwriter, arranger, and guitarist (although he may be more precisely called a multi-instrumentalist).

== Biography ==
Saka received art training in Istanbul and later music training in France and (Germany). He had to leave Turkey in 1980, after the coup for political reasons. He lived in Europe up until 1998, travelling and collaborating with numerous musicians. Saka still divides most of his time between Istanbul, Hamburg, and Paris and tours several countries with his Fuat Saka International Group consisting of German, American, Georgian, and Azerbaijani musicians. He is of also Georgian descent by his mother. He has performed with Greek musicians Nikos Papazoglou and Dionysis Savvopoulos since the mid-1980s.

== Discography ==
- 1982 Yıkılır Zulmün Son Kaleleri
- 1983 Ayrılık Türküsü
- 1984 Kerem Gibi (Poems of Nazım Hikmet)
- 1987 Sevdalı Türküler
- 1988 Nebengleis (Kenardaki Ray)
- 1989 Askaros
- 1991 Semahlar ve Deyişler
- 1993 Şiirce
- 1994 Torik Baliklar Ülkesinde
- 1996 Arhavili İsmail
- 1997 Lazutlar
- 1998 Sen
- 2000 Lazutlar II
- 2001 Perçem Perçem
- 2002 Lazutlar III
- 2004 Lazutlar Livera
- 2005 Lazutlar (Seçmeler)
- 2006 Bir Sürgünün Not Defteri
- 2006 Fuat Saka Koleksiyon (3 CD)
- 2008 Lazutlar 2008
- 2012 Nenni
