= Lautém Administrative Post =

Administrative post in Lautém Municipality, East Timor

Lautém
- Administrative Post
- Posto Administrativo de Lautém (Portuguese); Postu administrativu Lautein (Tetum)
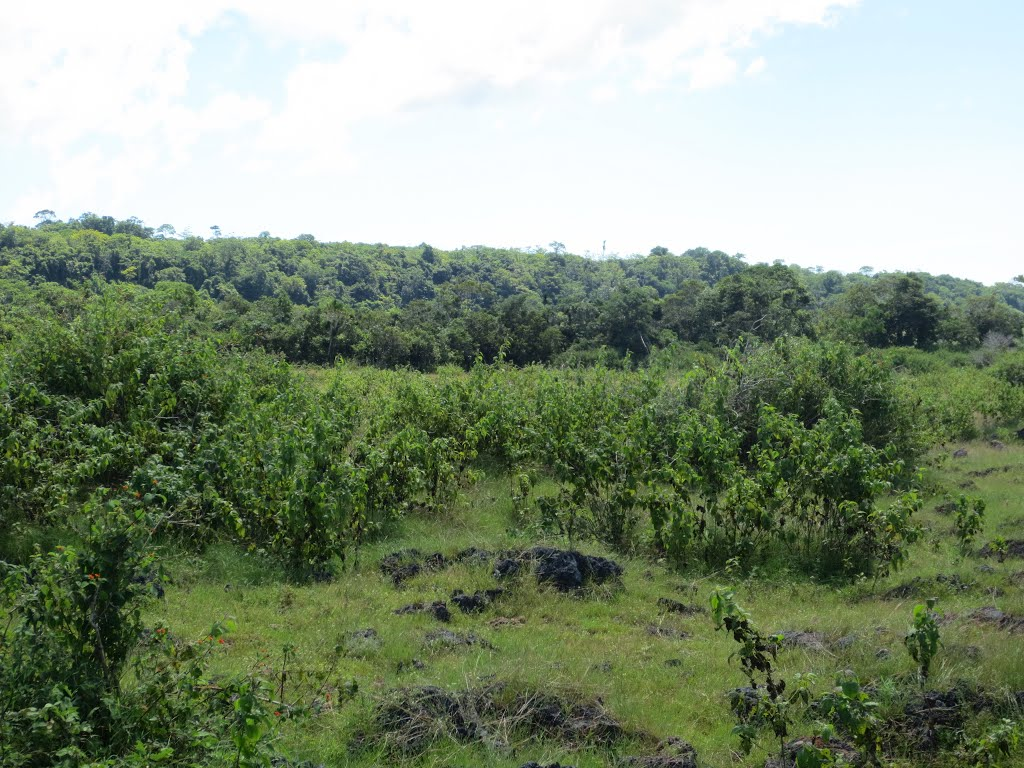
- Secondary forest and shrubland on Assalaino plateau

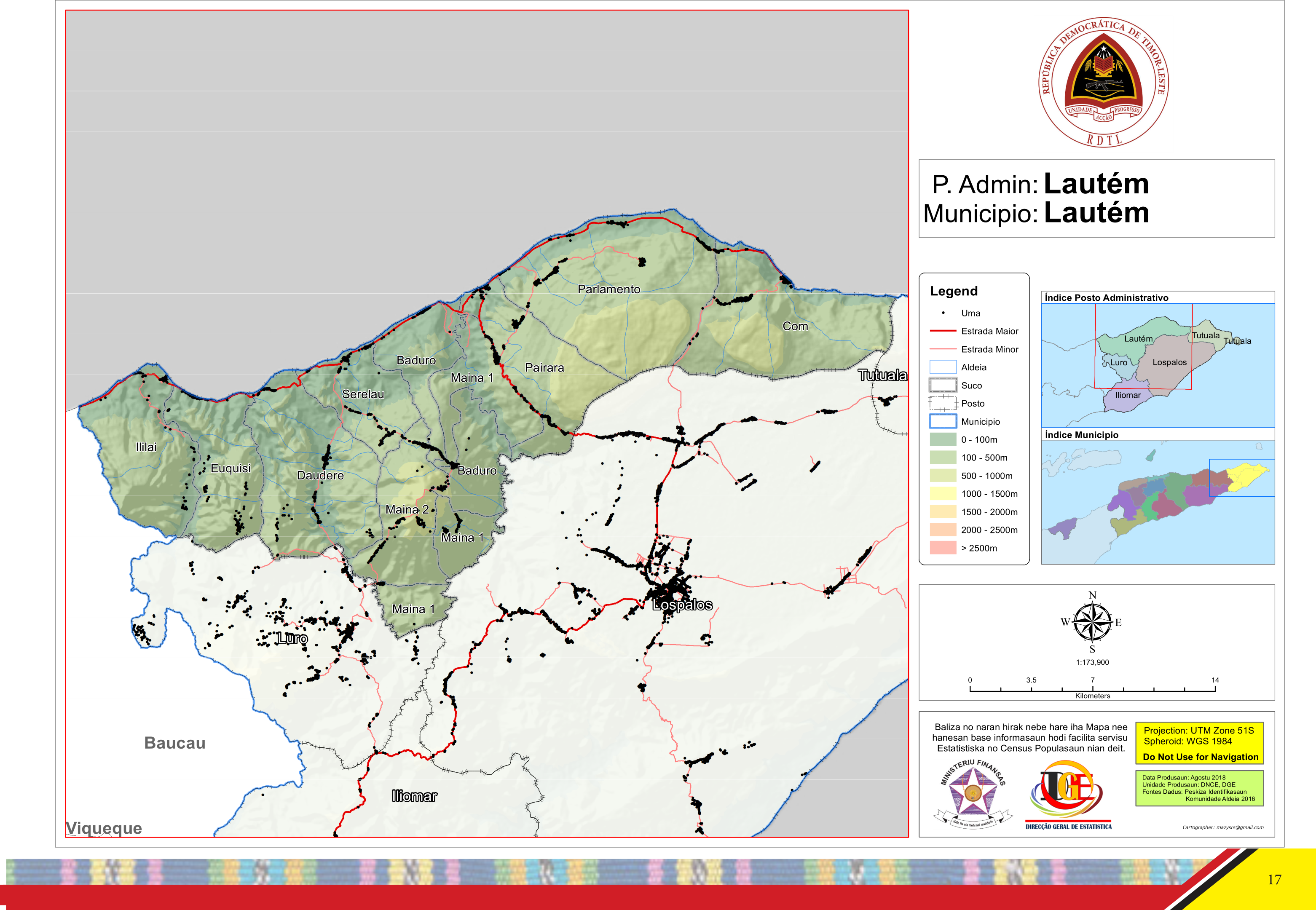
- Official map

- Location within East Timor
- Coordinates: 8°23′S 126°54′E
- Country: Timor-Leste
- Municipality: Lautém
- Seat: Parlamento
- Sucos: Baduro; Com; Daudere; Euquisi; Ililai; Maina I; Maina II; Pairara; Parlamento; Serelau

Area
  - Total: 454.9 km^{2} (175.6 sq mi)

Population (2015 census)
  - Total: 15,989
  - Density: 35.15/km^{2} (91.03/sq mi)

Households (2015 census)
  - Total: 2,957
- Time zone: UTC+09:00 (TLT)

Lautém, officially Lautém Administrative Post (Portuguese: Posto Administrativo de Lautém, Tetum: Postu administrativu Lautein), is an administrative post (and was formerly a subdistrict) in Lautém municipality, Timor-Leste. Its seat or administrative centre is Parlamento.
