= Pairara =

Coordinates: 8.4006°S 126.9100°E

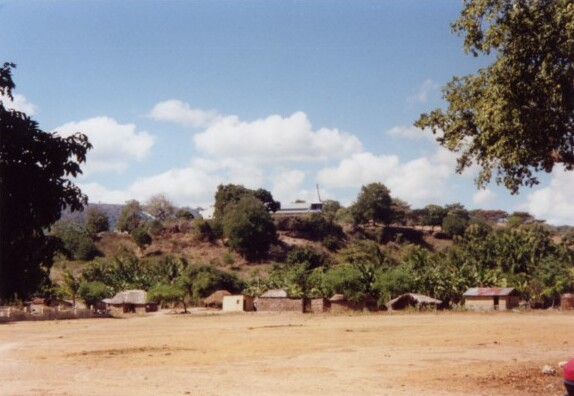

Pairara is a suco in the Lautém Municipality of Timor-Leste.

== Population ==
The population of Pairara in 2015 was 2,164 inhabitants living in an area of 26.77 km^{2}, with a population density of 80.85 inhabitants per km^{2}.
