= Iliomar Administrative Post =

Administrative post in Lautém Municipality, Timor-Leste

Iliomar
- Administrative Post
- Posto Administrativo de Iliomar (Portuguese); Postu administrativu Iliomar (Tetum)
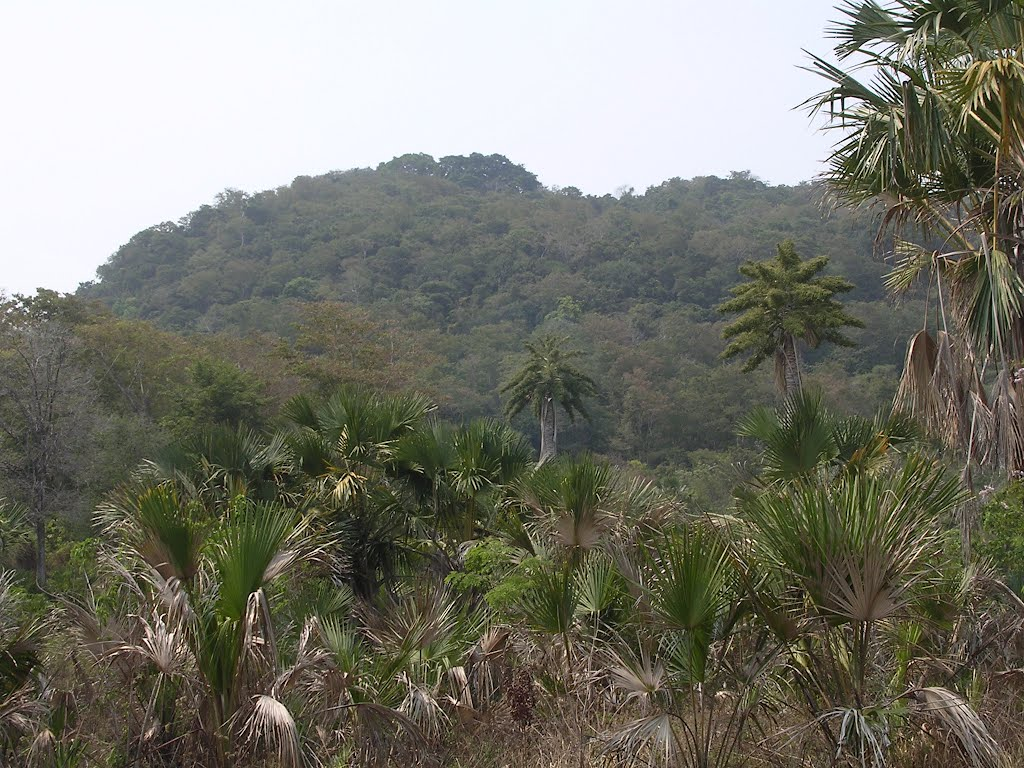
- Tropical dry forest and Corypha palm savanna along the Lospalos–Uatucarbau road

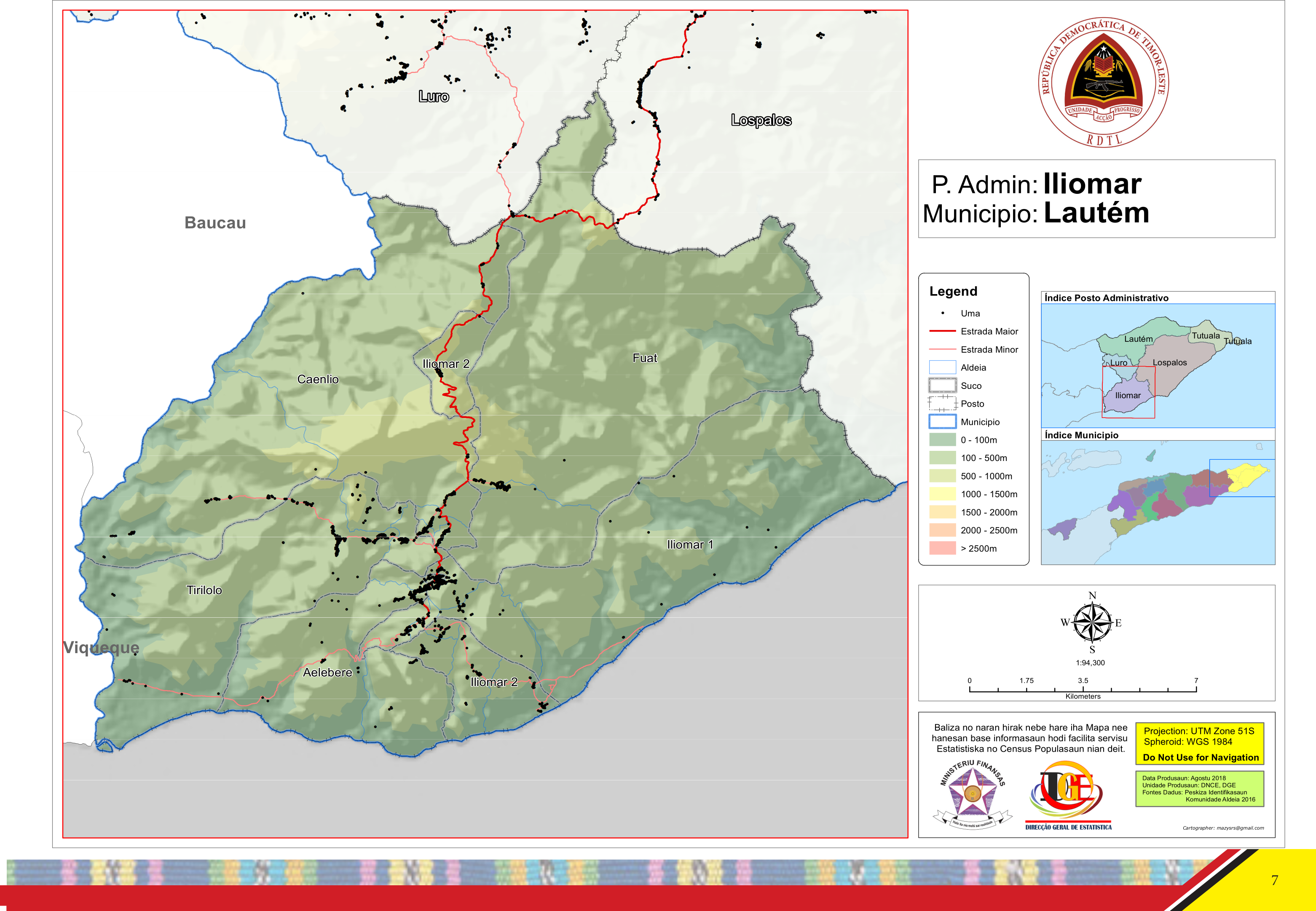
- Official map

- Location within East Timor
- Coordinates: 8°43′S 126°50′E
- Country: Timor-Leste
- Municipality: Lautém
- Seat: Aelebere
- Sucos: Aelebere; Caenlio; Fuat; Iliomar I; Iliomar II; Tirilolo

Area
  - Total: 302.1 km^{2} (116.6 sq mi)

Population (2015 census)
  - Total: 7,449
  - Density: 24.66/km^{2} (63.86/sq mi)
- Time zone: UTC+09:00 (TLT)

Iliomar, officially Iliomar Administrative Post (Portuguese: Posto Administrativo de Iliomar, Tetum: Postu administrativu Iliomar), is an administrative post (and was formerly a subdistrict) in Lautém municipality, Timor-Leste. Its seat or administrative centre is Aelebere, and its population at the 2004 census was 6,726.
