= List of passenger airlines =

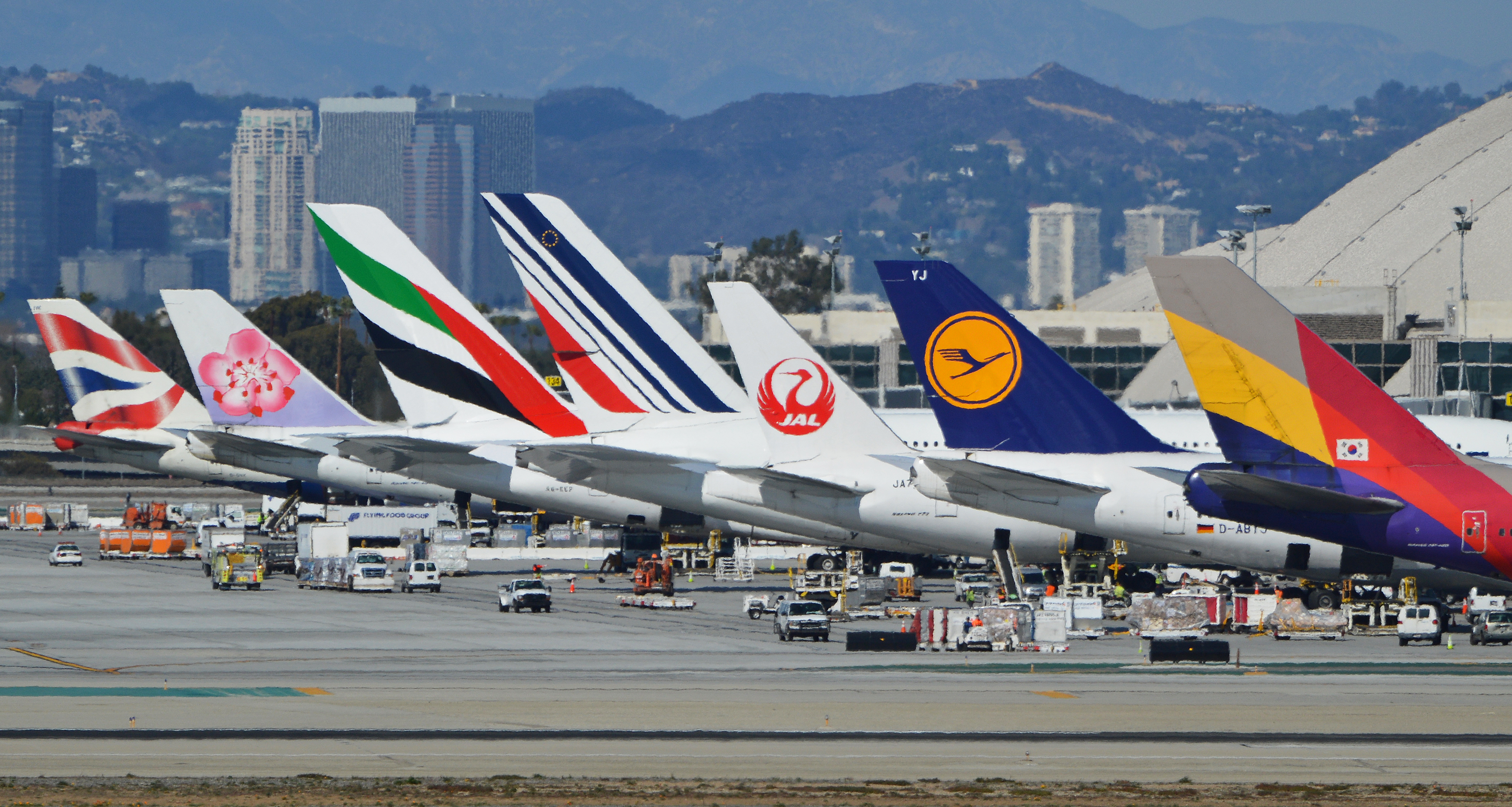
Various passenger airlines from different countries parked at Los Angeles International Airport

This is a list of airlines in operation that offer regular (usually scheduled) service to paying passengers from the general public. This list includes some airlines that offer charter service on a regular basis between fixed destinations. It also includes some airlines in the process of formation, planning to embark upon their maiden voyage soon.

Defunct airlines are listed instead at list of defunct airlines.

List of airlines includes all airlines, including cargo, charter, and corporate carriers not listed here.

== List of airlines ==
=== Africa ===
Contents: Top - A B C D E G I K L M N R S T U Z

==== Algeria ====
- Air Algérie
- Air Express Algeria
- Star Aviation
- Tassili Airlines

==== Angola ====
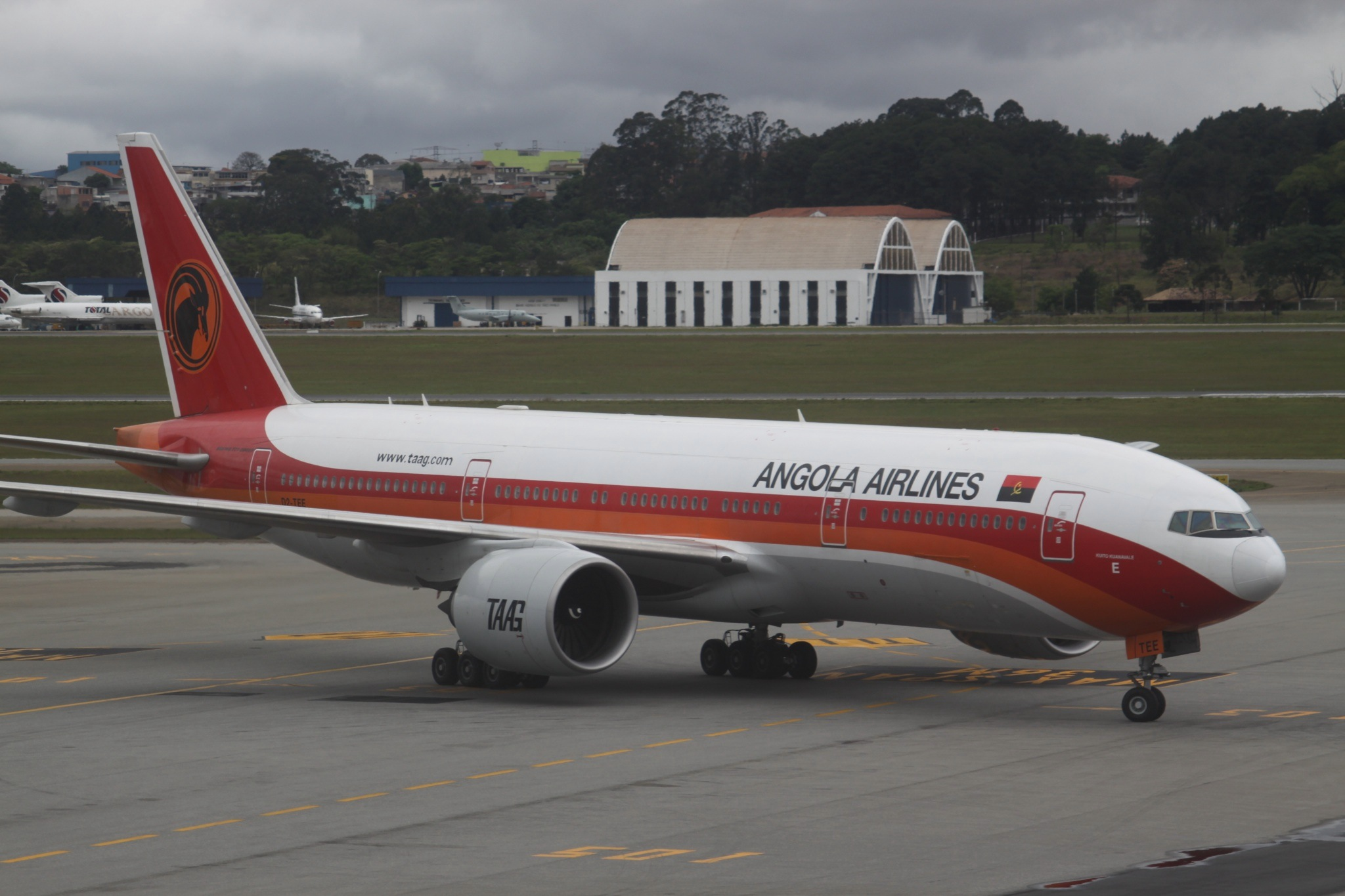
TAAG Angola Airlines Boeing 777

- Airjet Exploração Aérea de Carga
- Angola Air Charter
- Fly Angola
- Heli Malongo
- TAAG Angola Airlines

==== Botswana ====
- Air Botswana
- Mack Air
- Wilderness Air

==== Burkina Faso ====
- Air Burkina

==== Burundi ====
- Burundi Airlines

==== Cameroon ====
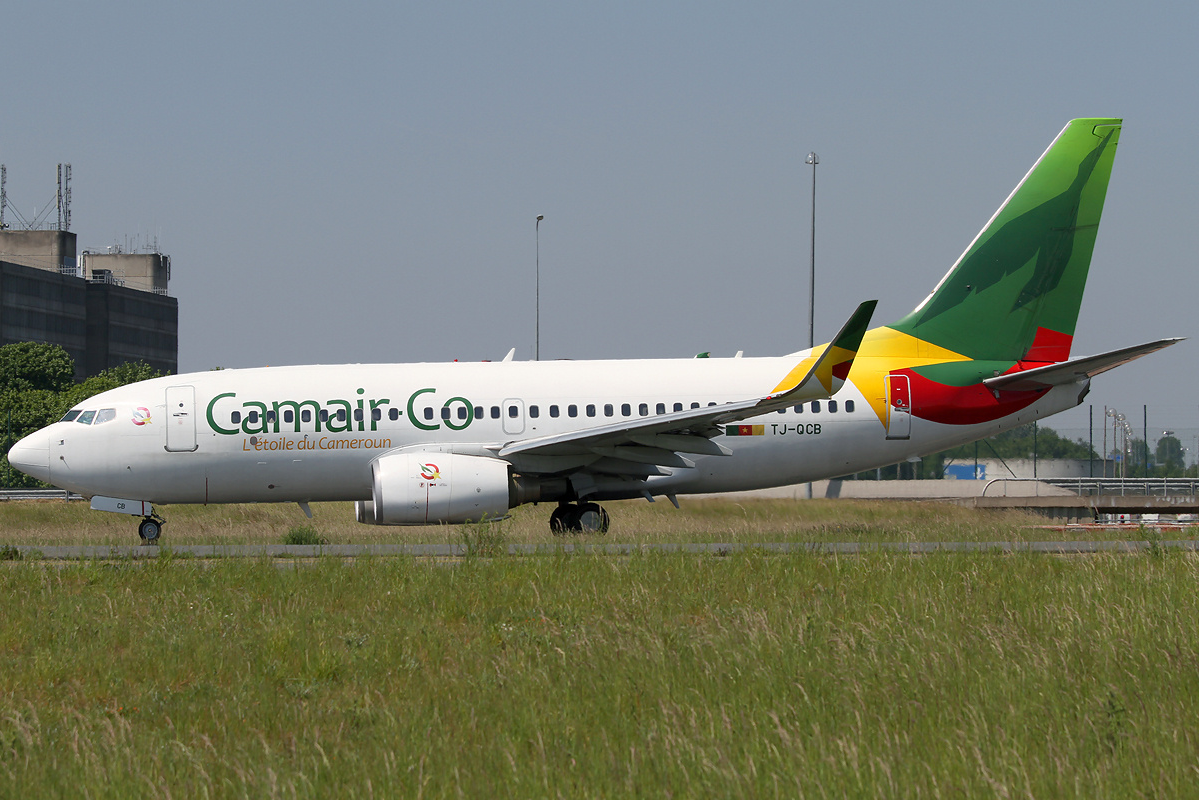
Camair-Co's Boeing 737-700

- Air Leasing Cameroon
- Camair-Co
- Section Liaison Air Yaoundé

==== Cape Verde ====
- Cabo Verde Airlines
- Bestfly Cabo Verde

==== Democratic Republic of the Congo ====
- Congo Airways
- FlyCAA
- Gomair

==== Republic of the Congo ====
- Canadian Airways Congo
- Trans Air Congo

==== Côte d'Ivoire ====
- Air Côte d'Ivoire

==== Djibouti ====
- Air Djibouti
- Daallo Airlines

==== Egypt ====
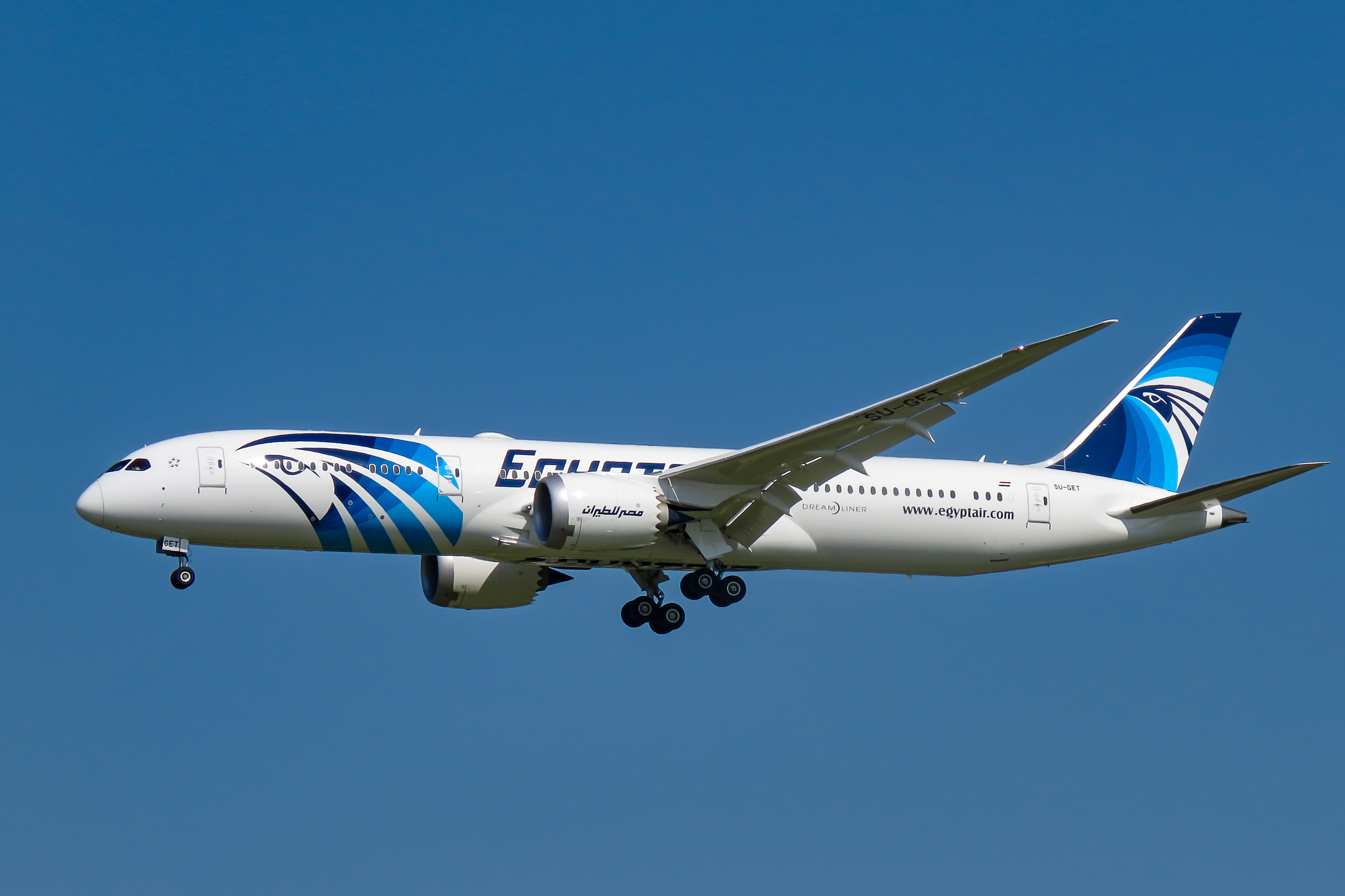
EgyptAir Boeing 787-9

- Air Cairo
- Alexandria Airlines
- AlMasria Universal Airlines
- AMC Aviation
- EgyptAir
- FlyEgypt
- Nesma Airlines
- Nile Air
- Red Sea Airlines
- Sky Vision Airlines

==== Equatorial Guinea ====
- CEIBA Intercontinental
- Cronos Airlines

==== Eritrea ====
- Eritrean Airlines (no active destinations, but does operate a few hajj flights)

==== Eswatini ====
- Eswatini Air

==== Ethiopia ====
- Ethiopian Airlines
- National Airways

==== Gabon ====
- AfriJet

==== Ghana ====
- Africa World Airlines
- Passion Air

==== Ivory Coast ====
See the section titled "Côte d'Ivoire" above.

==== Kenya ====
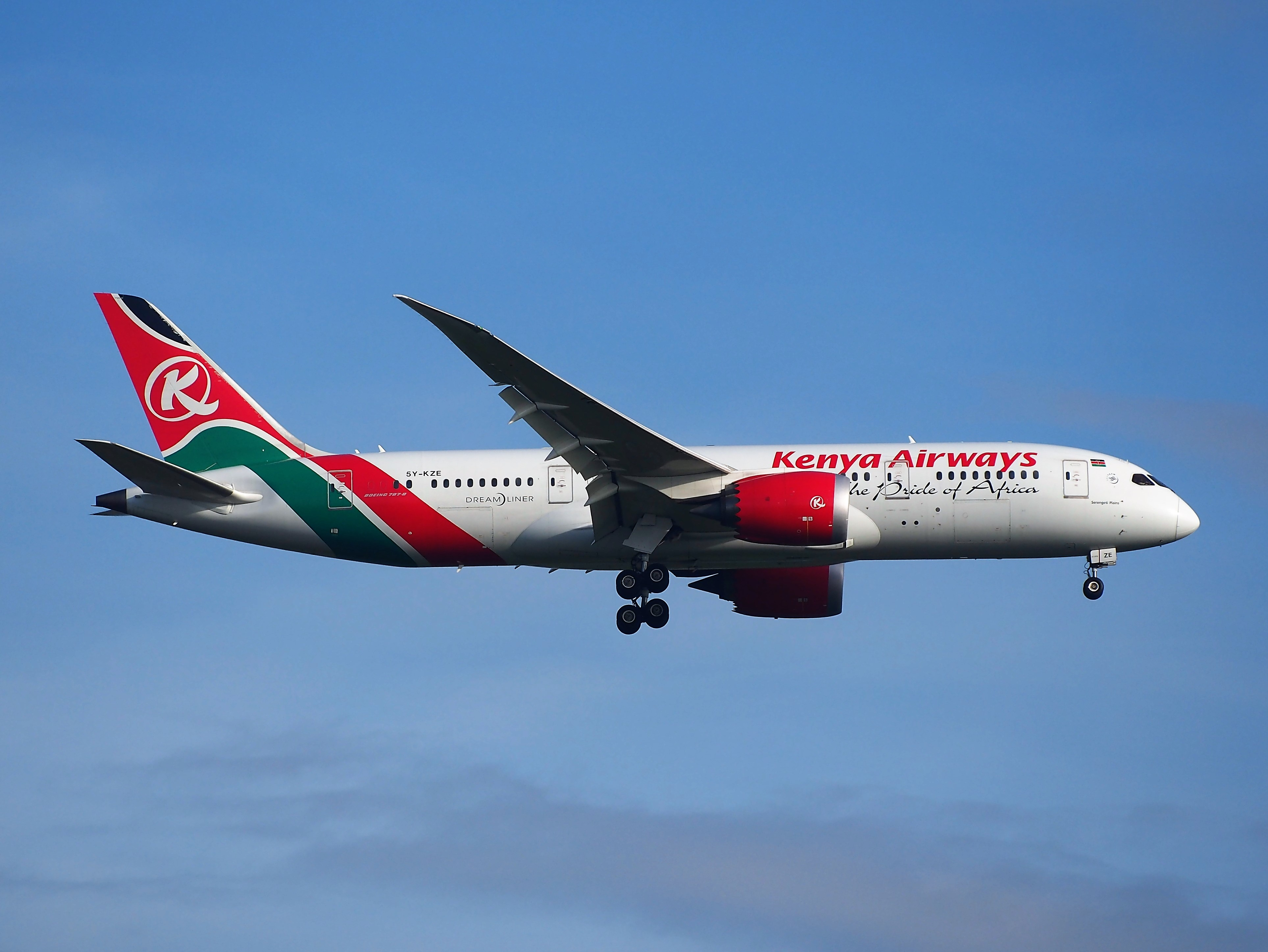
Kenya Airways Boeing 787-8 Dreamliner

- African Express Airways
- AirKenya
- Eastafrican
- Freedom Airline Express
- Jambojet
- Kenya Airways
- Mombasa Air Safari
- Renegade Air
- Safarilink Aviation
- Skyward Express

==== Libya ====
- Afriqiyah Airways
- Air Libya
- Berniq Airways
- Buraq Air
- Ghadames Air
- Libyan Airlines

==== Madagascar ====
- Madagascar Airlines

==== Malawi ====
- Malawian Airlines

==== Mali ====
- Sky Mali

==== Mauritania ====
- Mauritania Airlines

==== Mauritius ====
- Air Mauritius

==== Morocco ====
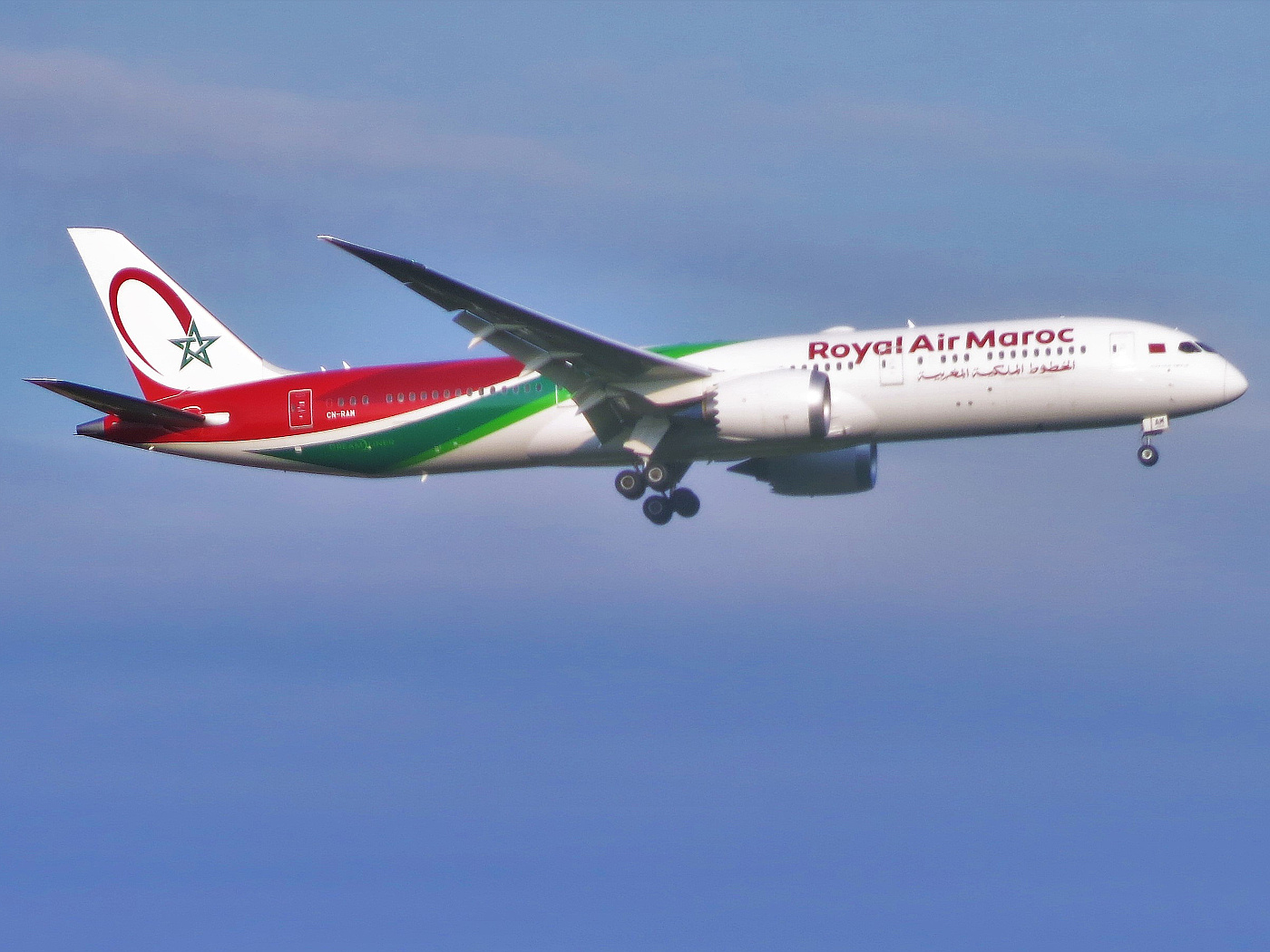
Royal Air Maroc Boeing 787-9 Dreamliner

- Royal Air Maroc
- Royal Air Maroc Express

==== Mozambique ====
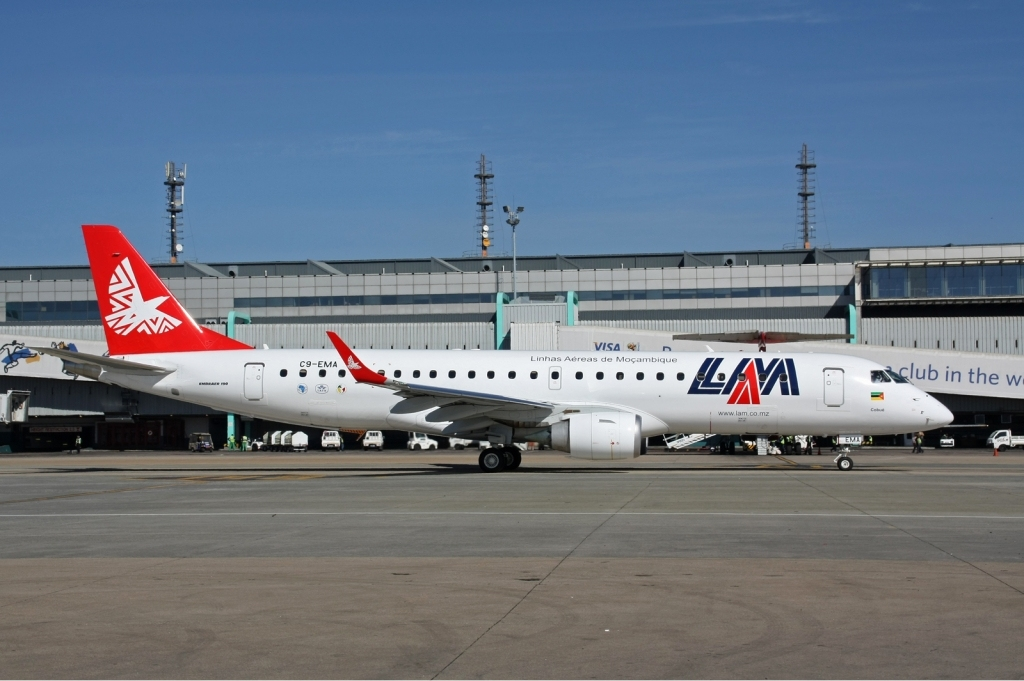
LAM Mozambique Airlines Embraer E-190

- LAM Mozambique Airlines

==== Namibia ====
- FlyNamibia

==== Niger ====
- Niger Airlines

==== Nigeria ====
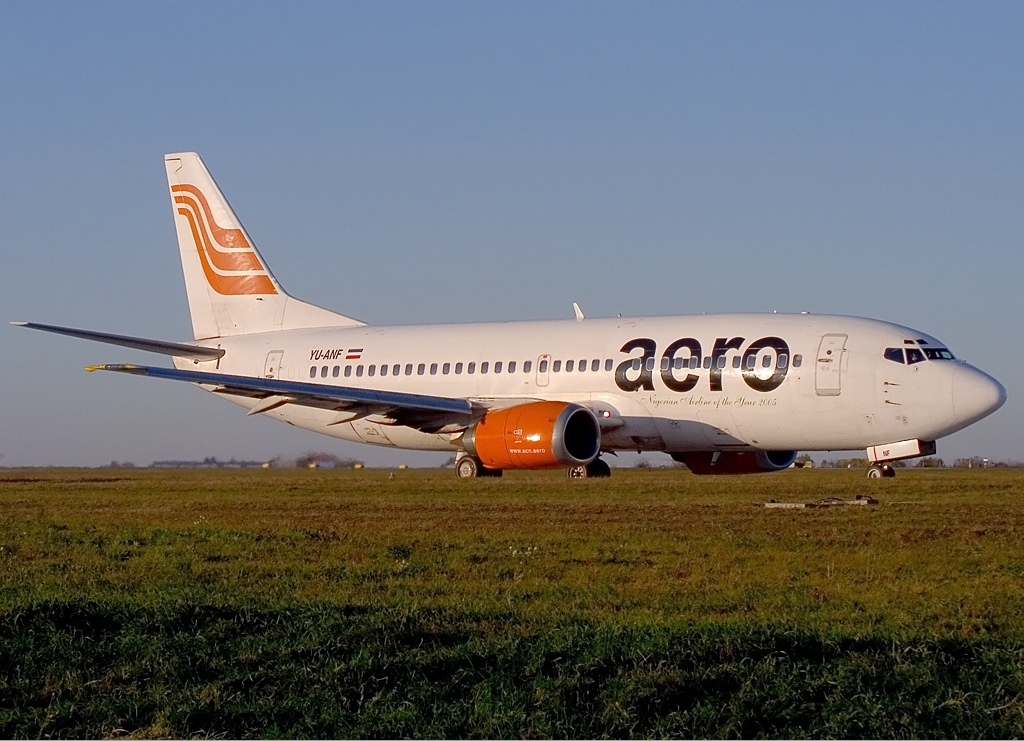
Aero Contractors Boeing 737-300

- Aero Contractors
- Air Peace
- Air Peace Hopper
- Arik Air
- Azman Air
- Binani Air (in formation)
- Dana Air
- Green Africa Airways
- Ibom Air
- Max Air
- Overland Airways
- Rano Air
- United Nigeria Airlines
- ValueJet
- XE Jet

==== Réunion ====
- Air Austral

==== Rwanda ====
- RwandAir

==== São Tomé and Príncipe ====
- STP Airways

==== Senegal ====
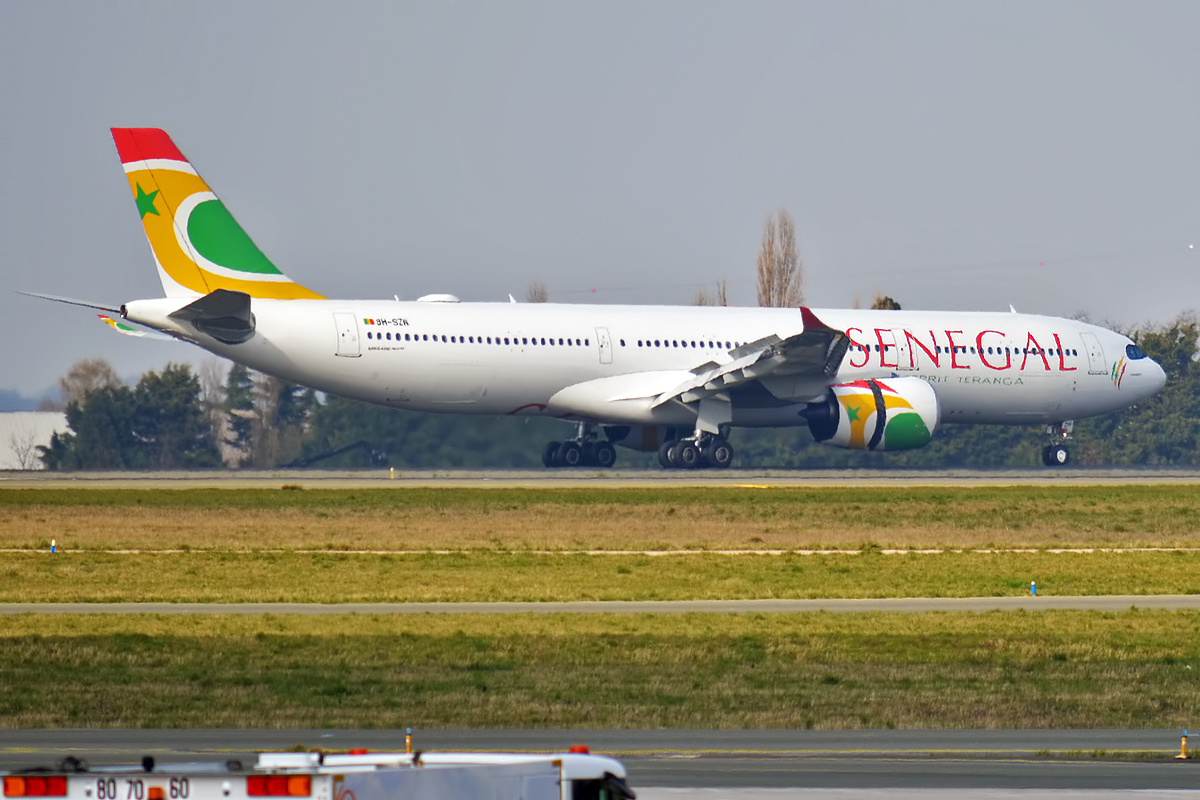
Air Senegal Airbus A330-900

- Air Senegal
- Transair

==== Seychelles ====
- Air Seychelles

==== Somalia ====
- Daruro Airline
- Halla Airlines
- Jubba Airways
- Saacid Airlines
- Salaam Air Express

==== South Africa ====
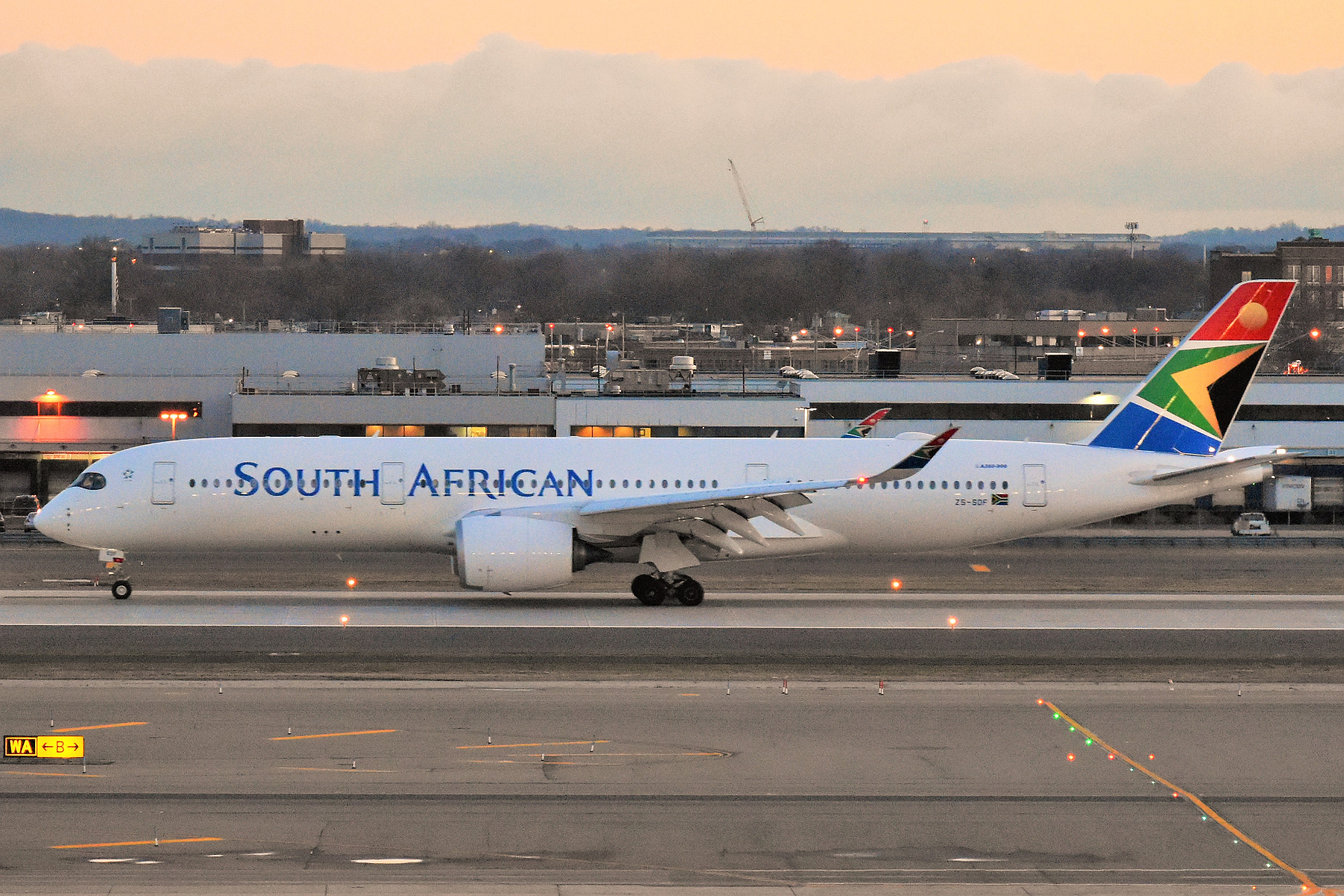
South African Airways Airbus A350-941

- Airlink
- CemAir
- FlySafair
- Lift
- South African Airways
- Mango Airlines (Owned by South African Airways, grounded, flying license suspended)

==== South Sudan ====
- Premier Airlines

==== Sudan ====
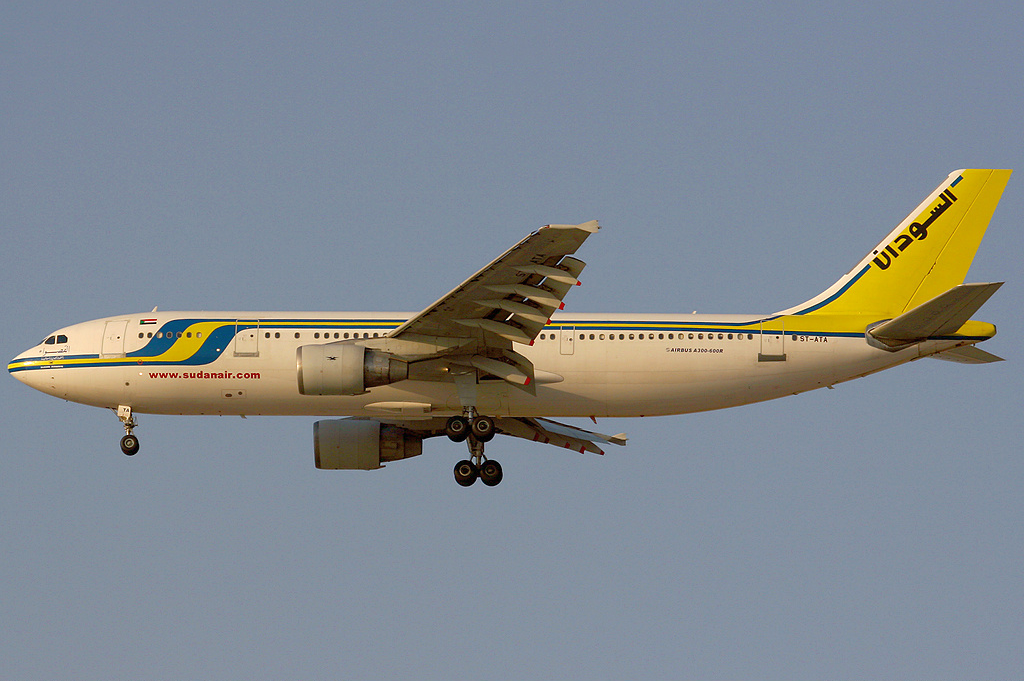
Sudan Airways Airbus A300B4-600R at Dubai International Airport (2006)

- Badr Airlines
- Mid Airlines
- Nova Airways
- Sudan Airways
- Tarco Aviation

==== Tanzania ====
- Air Tanzania
- As Salaam Air
- Auric Air
- Flightlink
- Precision Air
- Regional Air

==== Togo ====
- Asky Airlines

==== Tunisia ====
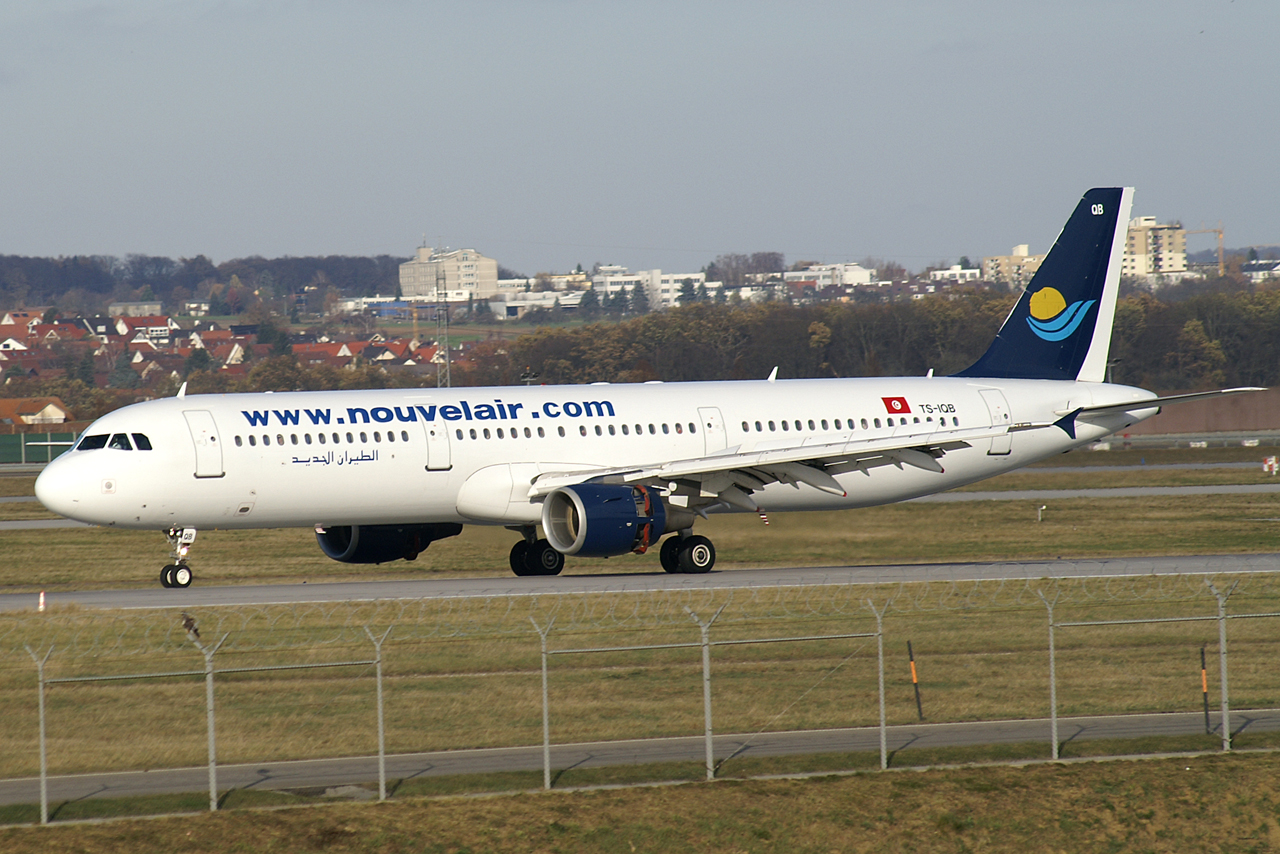
Nouvelair Tunisia Airbus A321

- Nouvelair Tunisia
- Tunisair
- Tunisair Express

==== Uganda ====
- Uganda Airlines

==== Zambia ====
- Proflight Zambia
- Zambia Airways

==== Zimbabwe ====
- Air Zimbabwe
- fastjet Zimbabwe

=== Asia ===
Contents: Top - A B C D E F G H I J K L M N O P Q R S T U V W X Y Z

For countries in the Middle East, refer to the section below.

==== Afghanistan ====
- Ariana Afghan Airlines
- Kam Air

==== Armenia ====
- Air Dilijans
- Armenia Airways
- Armenian Airlines
- Fly Arna
- Shirak Avia

==== Azerbaijan ====
- Azerbaijan Airlines

==== Bangladesh ====
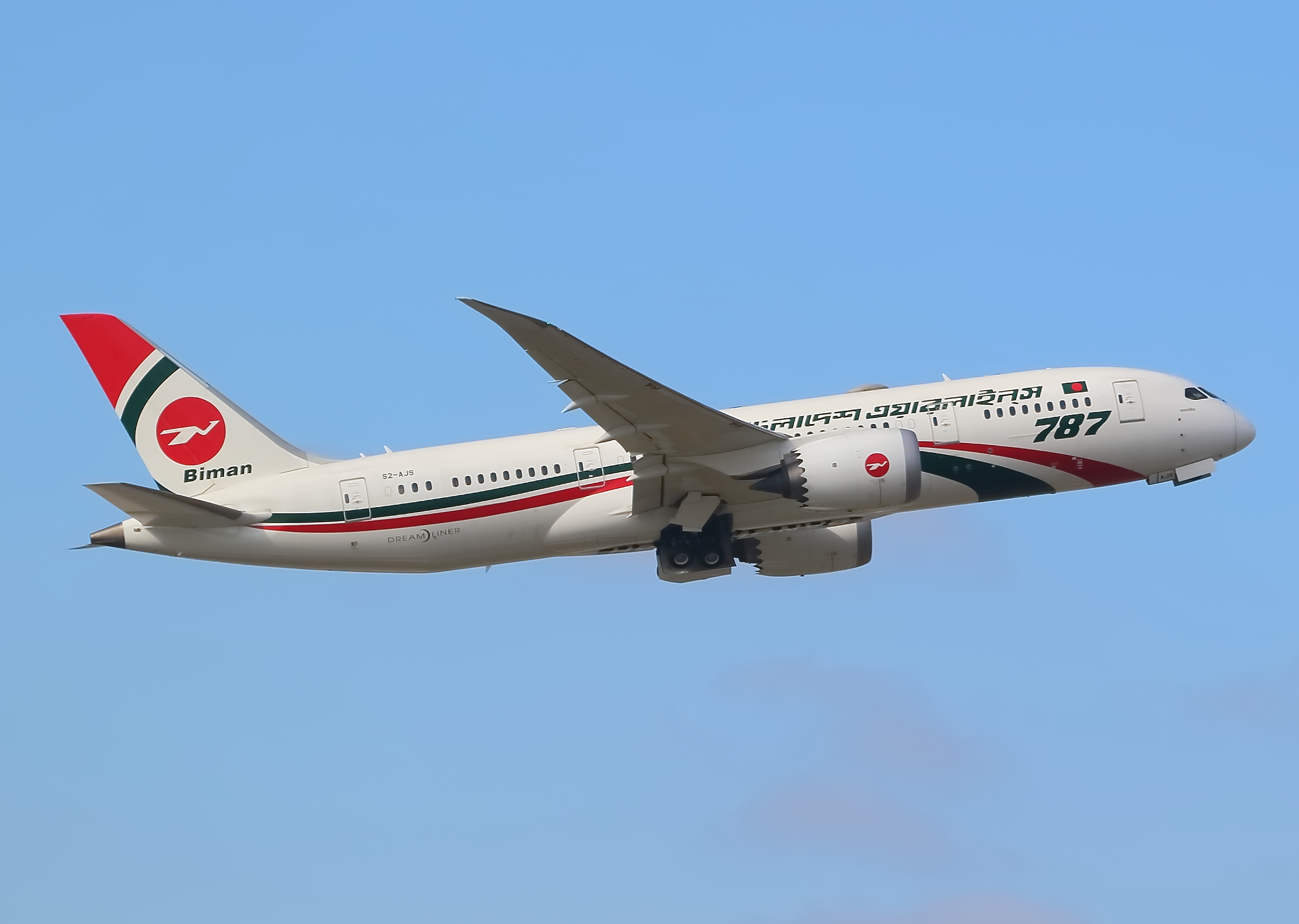
Biman Bangladesh Airlines Boeing 787

- Air Astra
- Biman Bangladesh Airlines
- NovoAir
- US-Bangla Airlines

==== Bhutan ====
- Bhutan Airlines
- Drukair

==== Brunei ====
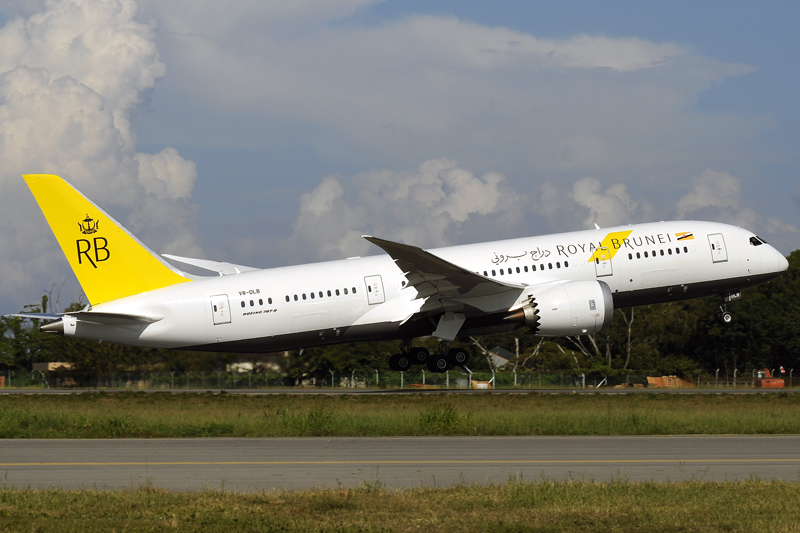
A Royal Brunei Airlines Boeing 787 departing Kota Kinabalu.

- Royal Brunei Airlines

==== Cambodia ====
- Cambodia Airways
- Cambodia Angkor Air
- Lanmei Airlines
- Sky Angkor Airlines

==== China ====
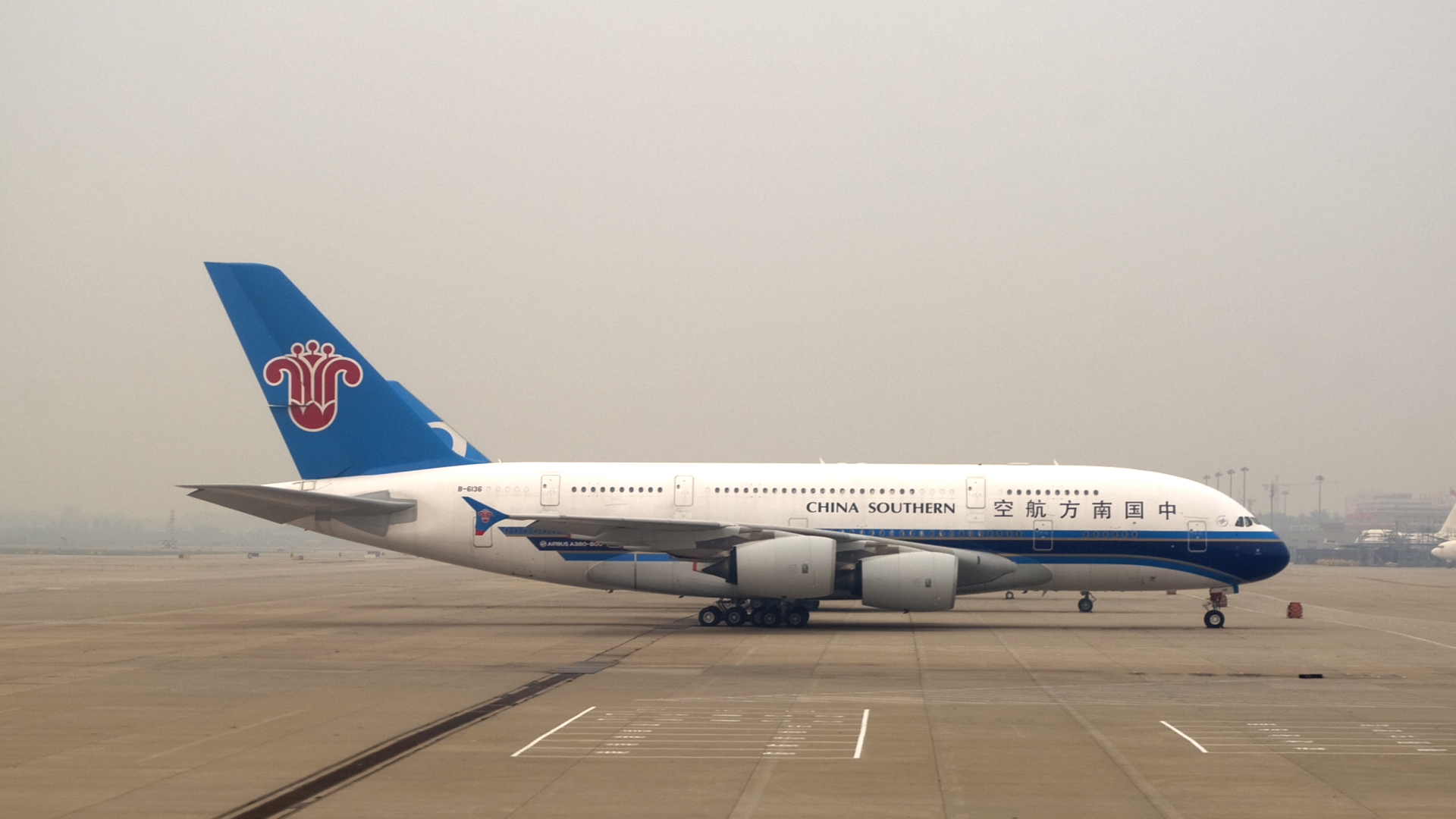
China Southern Airlines Airbus A380

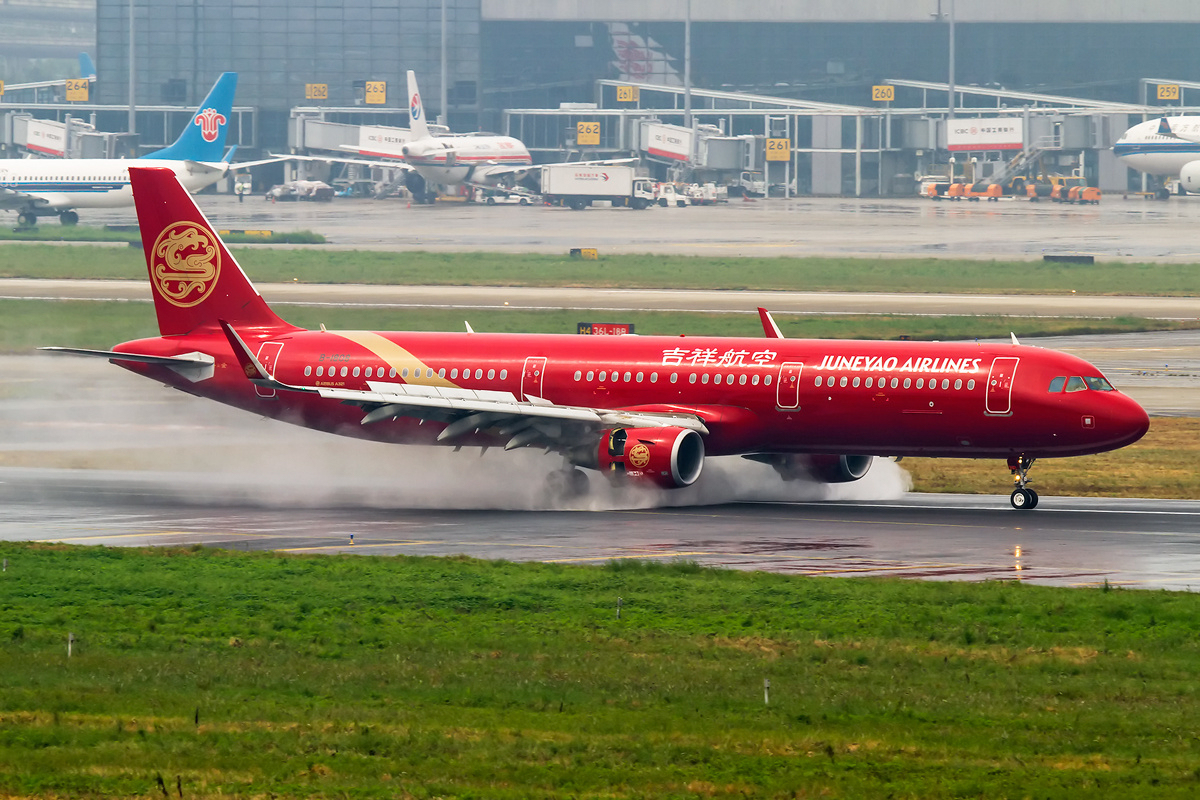
Juneyao Airlines Airbus A321-200

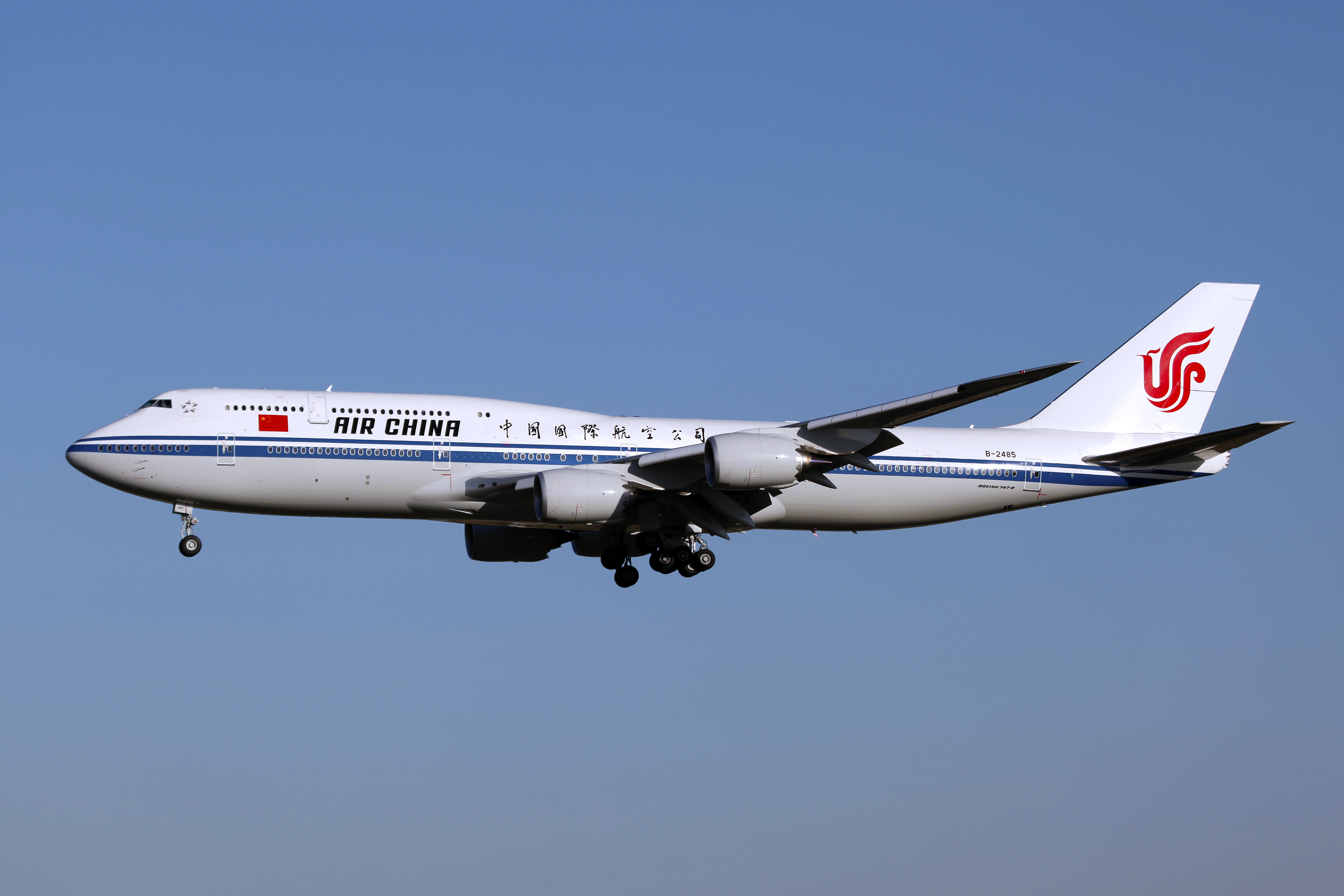
Air China Boeing 747-8

- 9 Air
- Air Changan
- Air China
- Air China Inner Mongolia
- Air Guilin
- Air Travel
- Beijing Airlines
- Capital Airlines
- Chengdu Airlines
- China Eastern Airlines
- China Eastern Yunnan Airlines
- China Express Airlines
- China Southern Airlines
- China United Airlines
- Chongqing Airlines
- Colorful Guizhou Airlines
- Dalian Airlines
- Donghai Airlines
- Fuzhou Airlines
- Genghis Khan Airlines
- Grand China Air
- GX Airlines
- Hainan Airlines
- Hebei Airlines
- Jiangxi Air
- Joy Air
- Juneyao Airlines
- Kunming Airlines
- Longjiang Airlines
- Loong Air
- Lucky Air
- Okay Airways
- OTT Airlines
- Qingdao Airlines
- Ruili Airlines
- Shandong Airlines
- Shanghai Airlines
- Shenzhen Airlines
- Sichuan Airlines
- Spring Airlines
- Suparna Airlines
- Tianjin Airlines
- Tibet Airlines
- Urumqi Air
- West Air
- Xiamen Airlines

===== Hong Kong =====
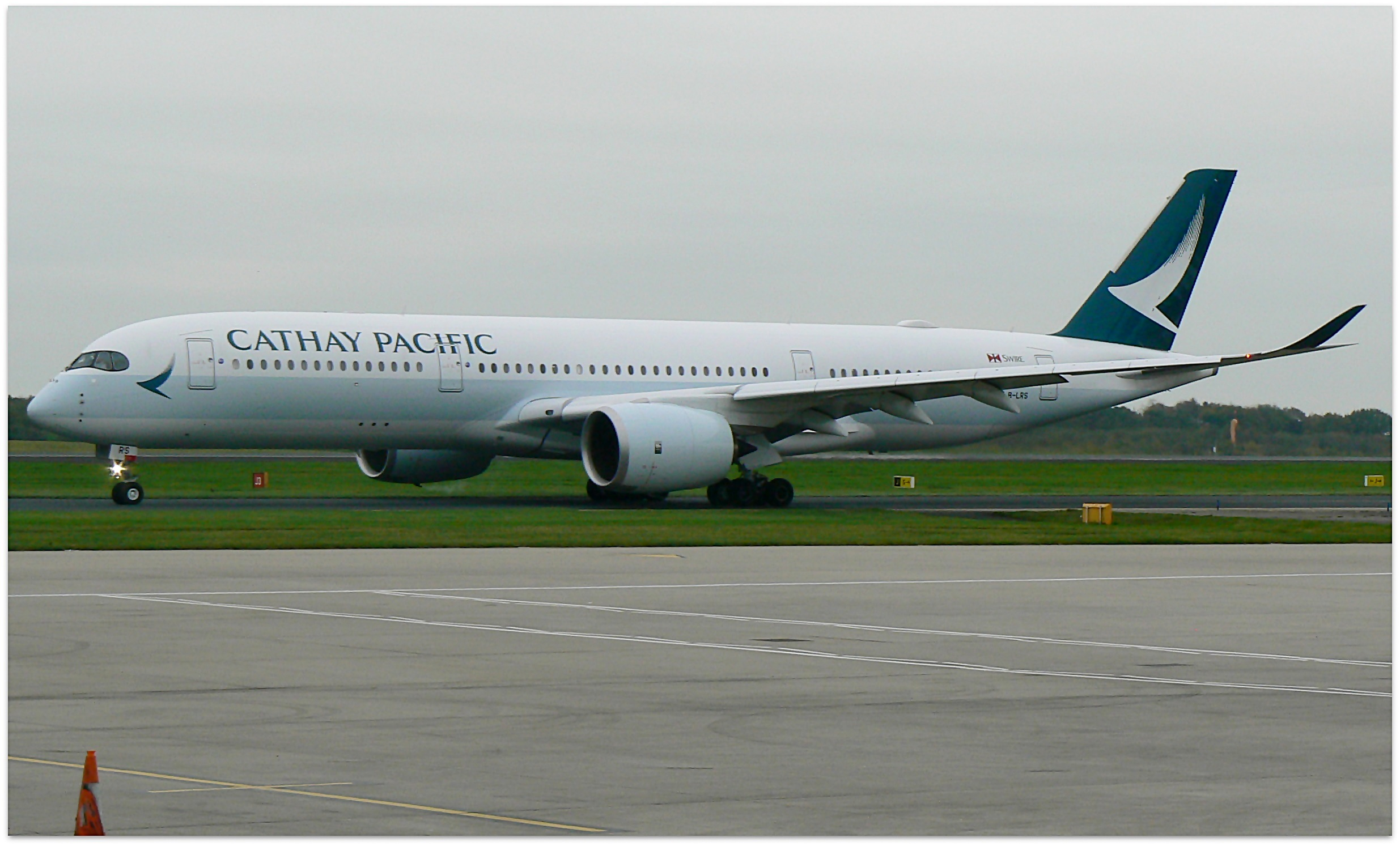
Cathay Pacific Airbus A350-900

- Cathay Pacific
- Greater Bay Airlines
- Hong Kong Airlines
- Hong Kong Express

===== Macau =====
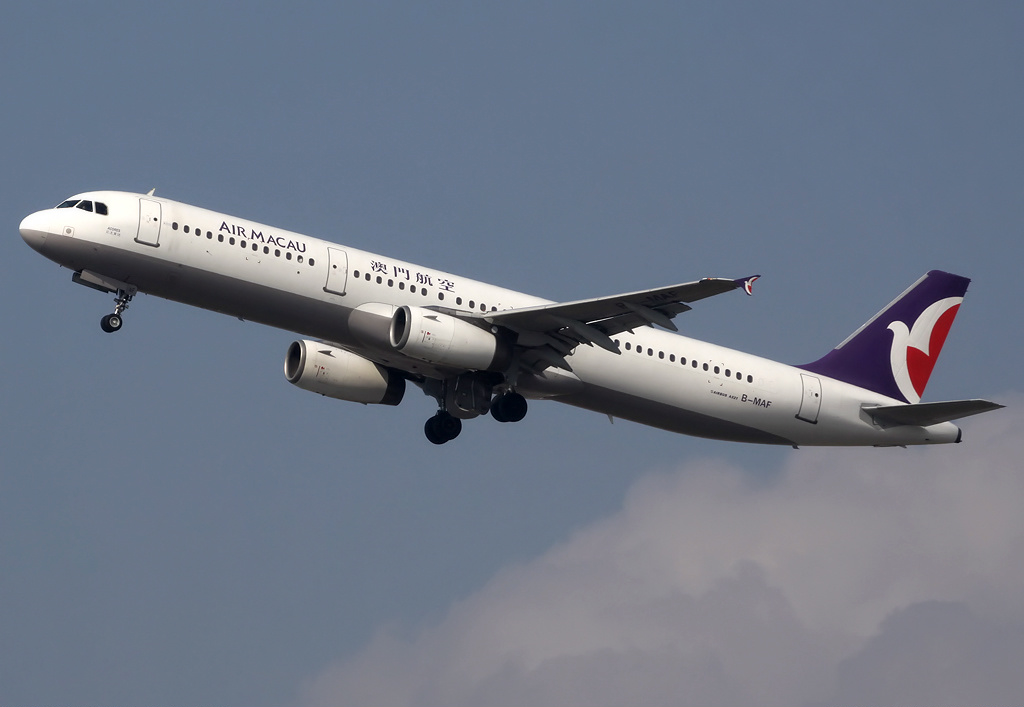
Air Macau Airbus A321-100

- Air Macau

==== East Timor ====
- Aero Dili
- Air Timor

==== Georgia ====
- Georgian Airways
- Georgian National Airlines

==== India ====
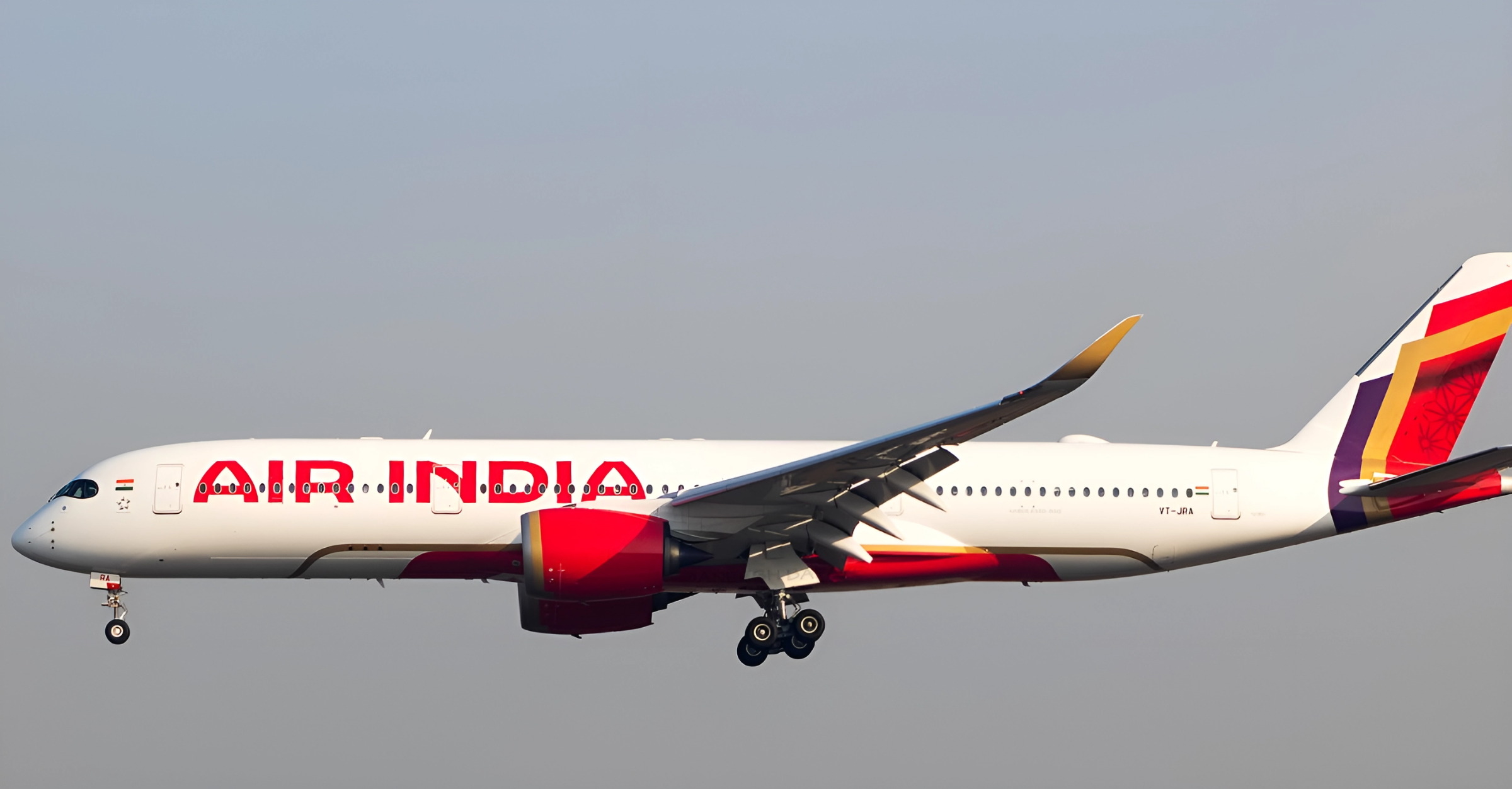
Air India Airbus A350-900

- Air India
- Air India Express
- Akasa Air
- Alliance Air
- Flybig
- IndiGo
- SpiceJet
- Star Air
- Zoom Air

==== Indonesia ====
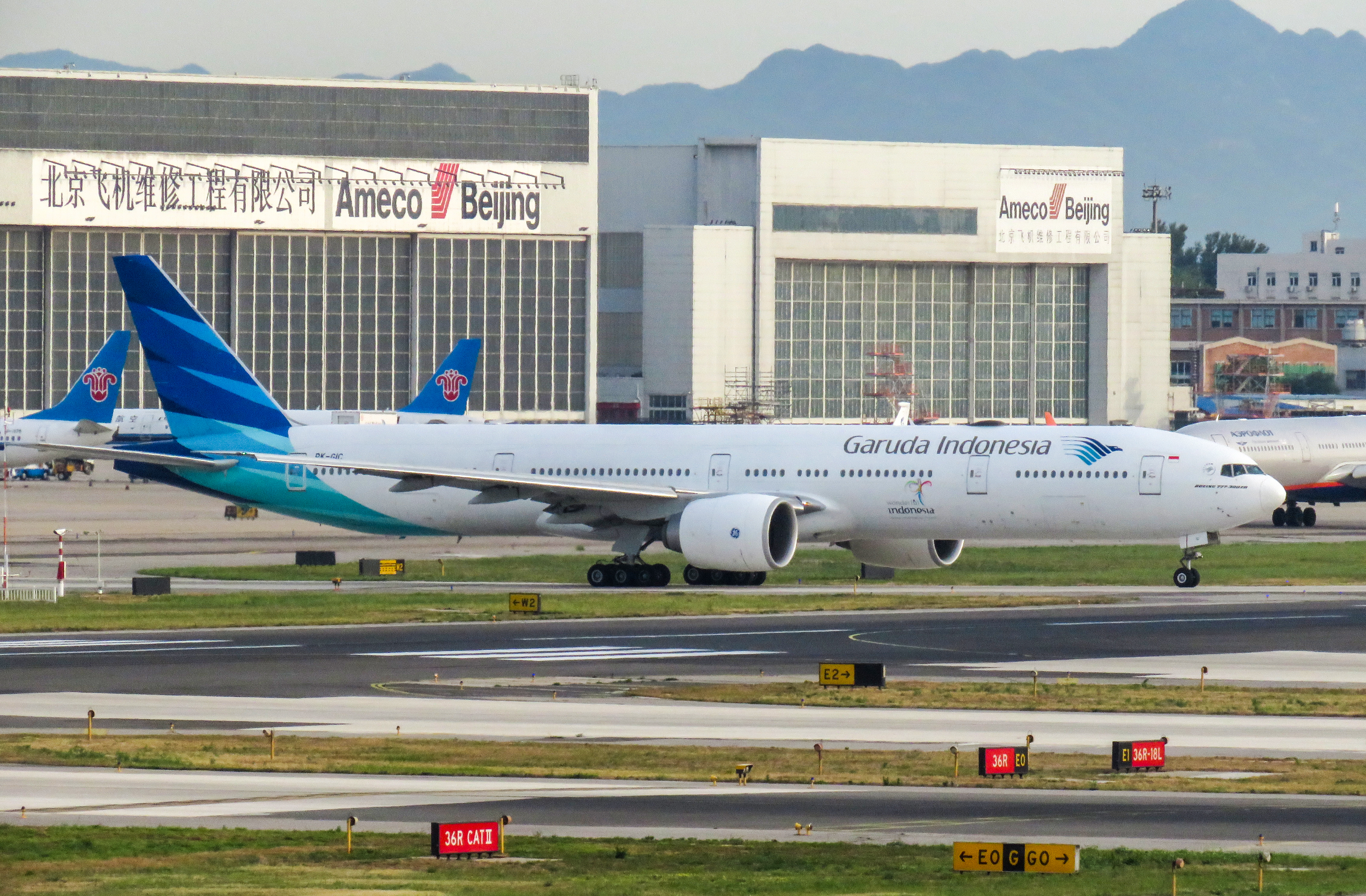
Garuda Indonesia Boeing 777-300ER

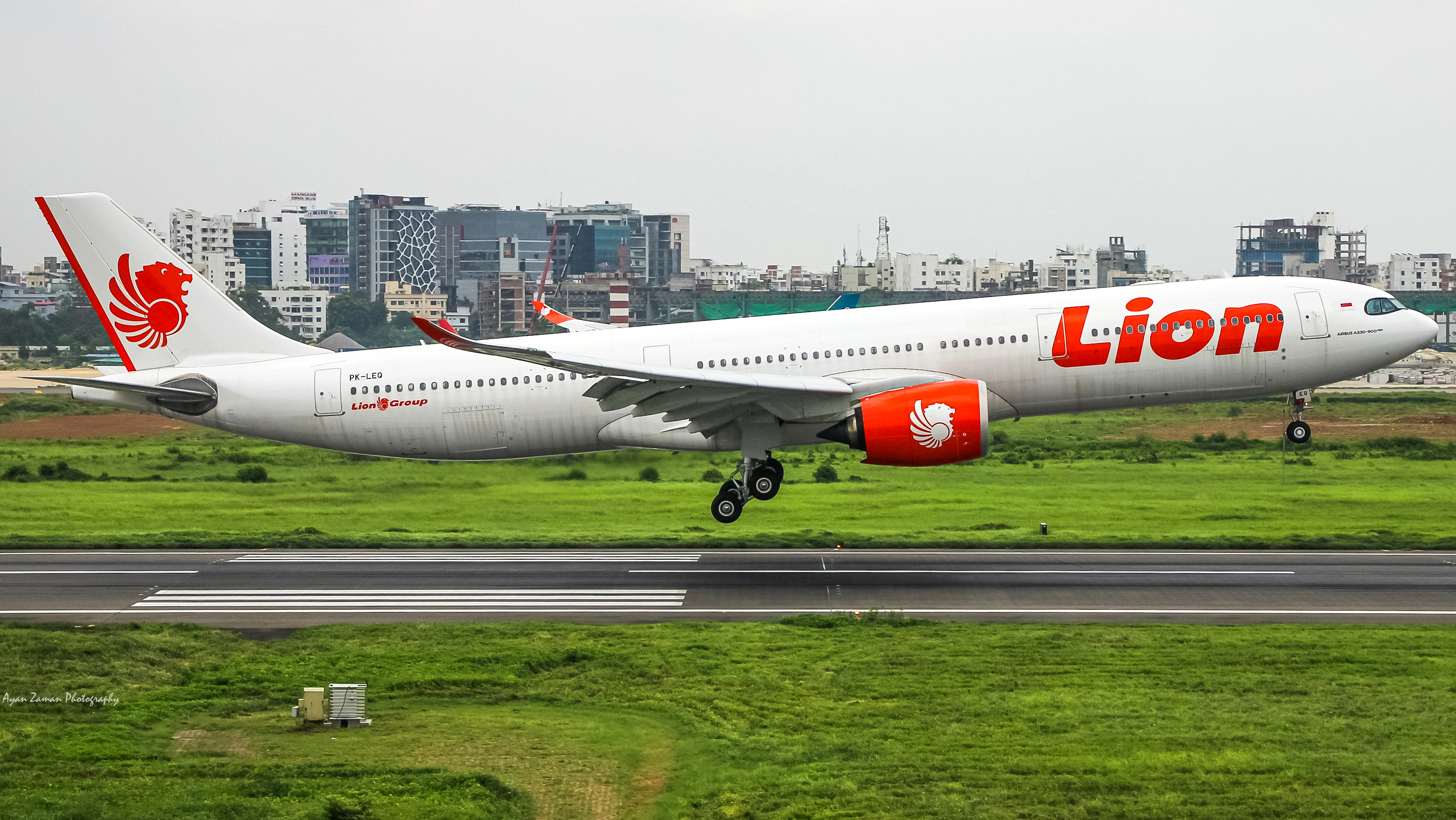
Lion Air Airbus A330-900

- Airfast Indonesia
- Batik Air
- Citilink
- EastIndo
- Garuda Indonesia
- Indonesia AirAsia (AirAsia's HQ is in Kuala Lumpur, Malaysia)
- Indonesia Air Transport
- Lion Air
- NAM Air
- Pelita Air
- Premiair
- Sriwijaya Air
- Super Air Jet
- Susi Air
- TransNusa
- Travira Air
- Trigana Air
- Wings Air

==== Japan ====
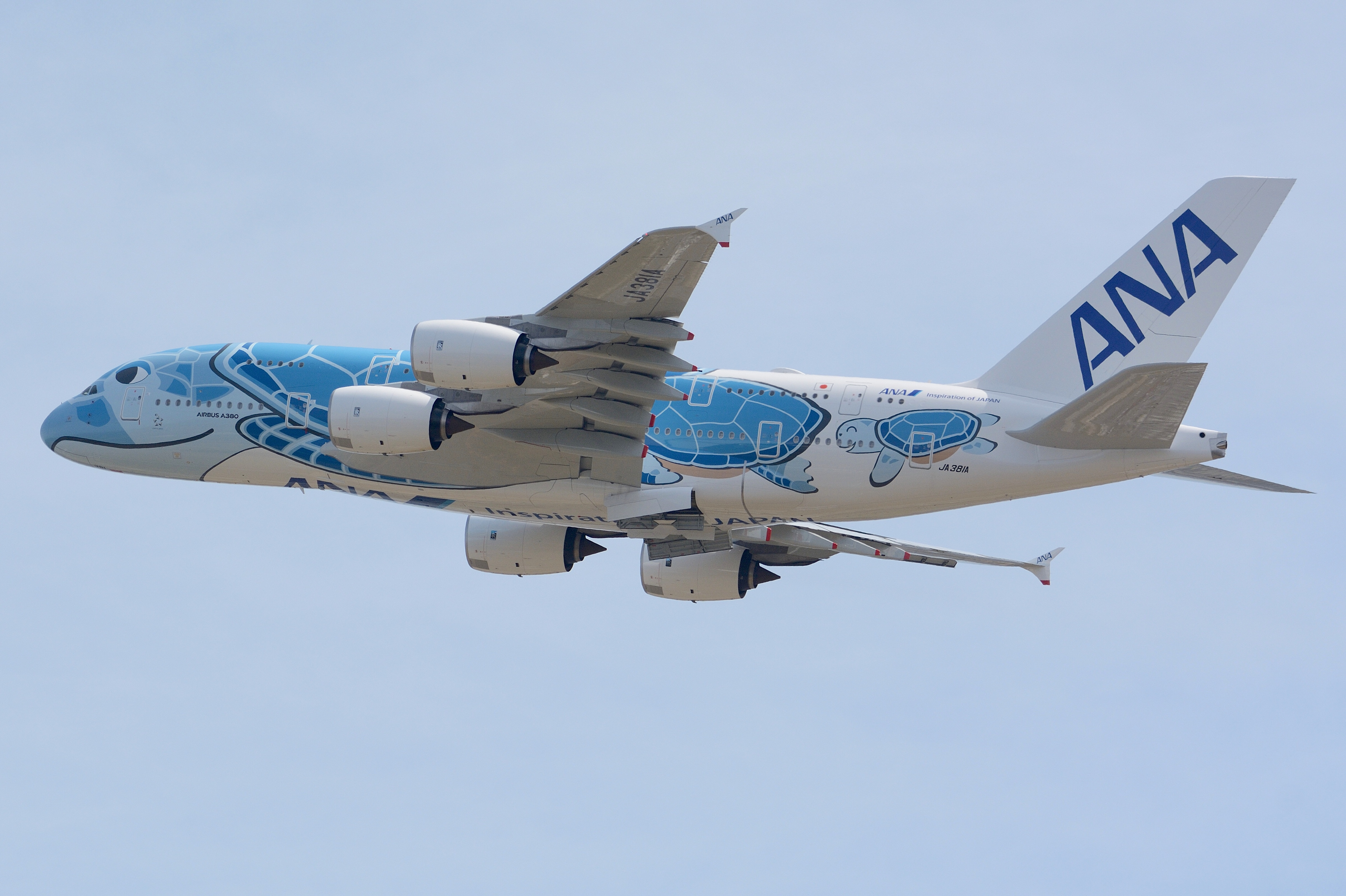
All Nippon Airways Airbus A380

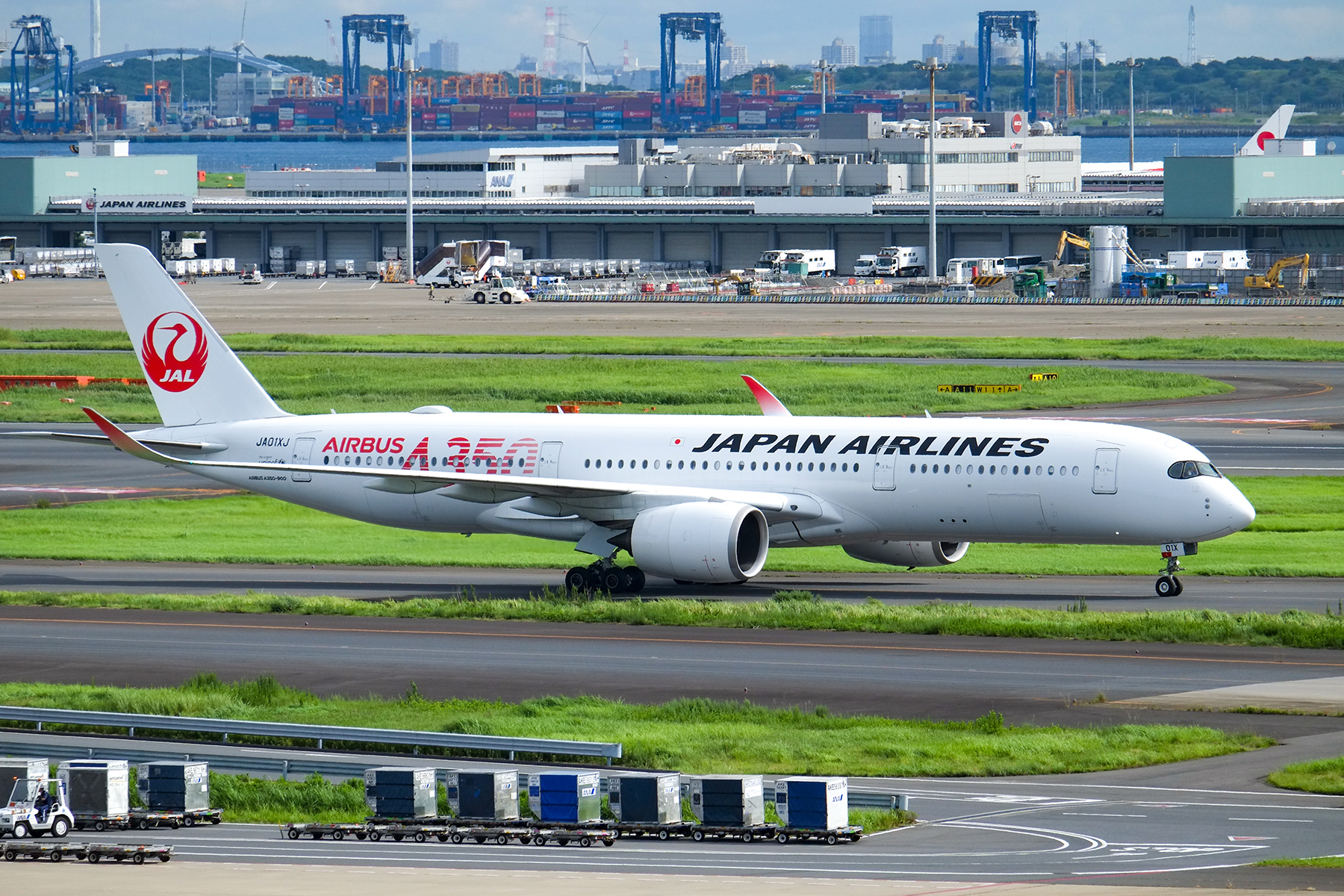
Japan Airlines Airbus A350-900

- Air Do
- Air Japan
- All Nippon Airways (ANA)
- Amakusa Airlines
- ANA Wings
- Fuji Dream Airlines
- Hokkaido Air System
- Ibex Airlines
- J-Air
- Japan Air Commuter
- Japan Airlines (JAL)
- Japan Transocean Air
- New Central Airservice
- Oriental Air Bridge
- Peach
- Ryukyu Air Commuter
- Skymark Airlines
- Solaseed Air
- Spring Airlines Japan
- Starflyer
- Toki Air
- Zipair

==== Kazakhstan ====
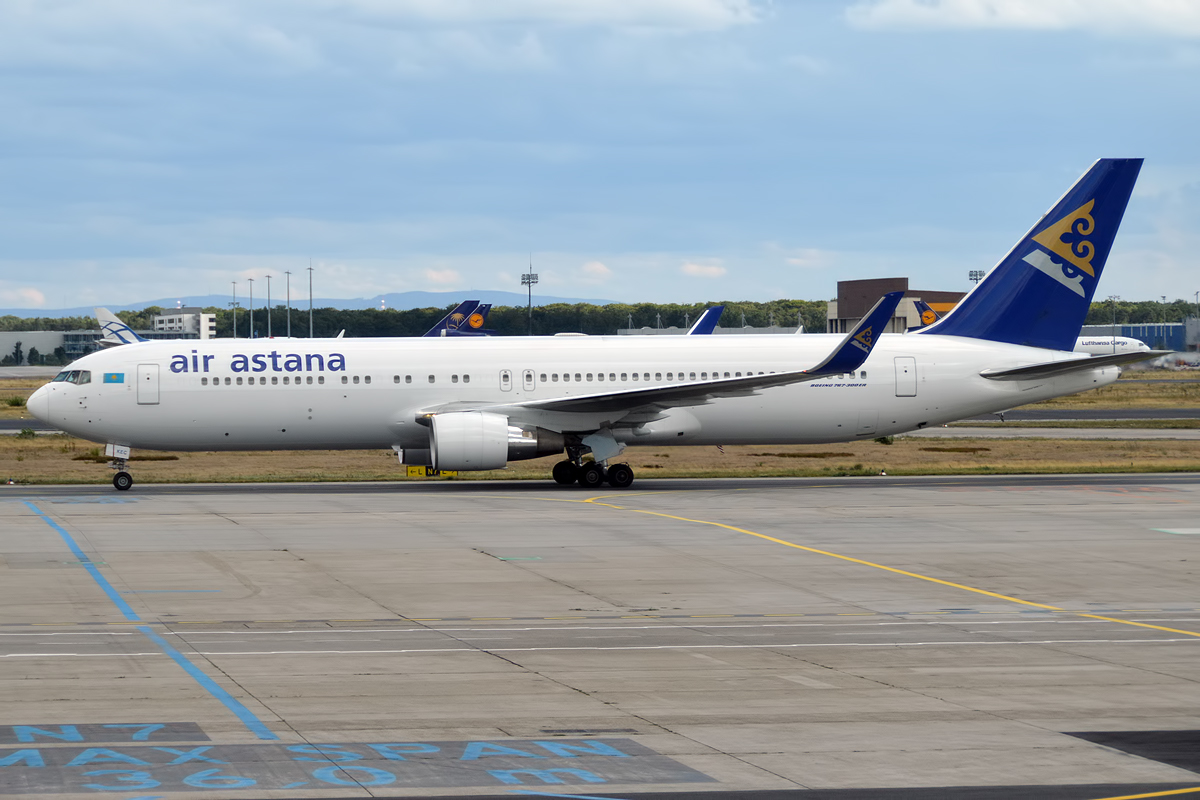
Air Astana Boeing 767-300ER

- Air Astana
- FlyArystan
- Qazaq Air
- SCAT Airlines

==== North Korea ====
- Air Koryo

==== South Korea ====
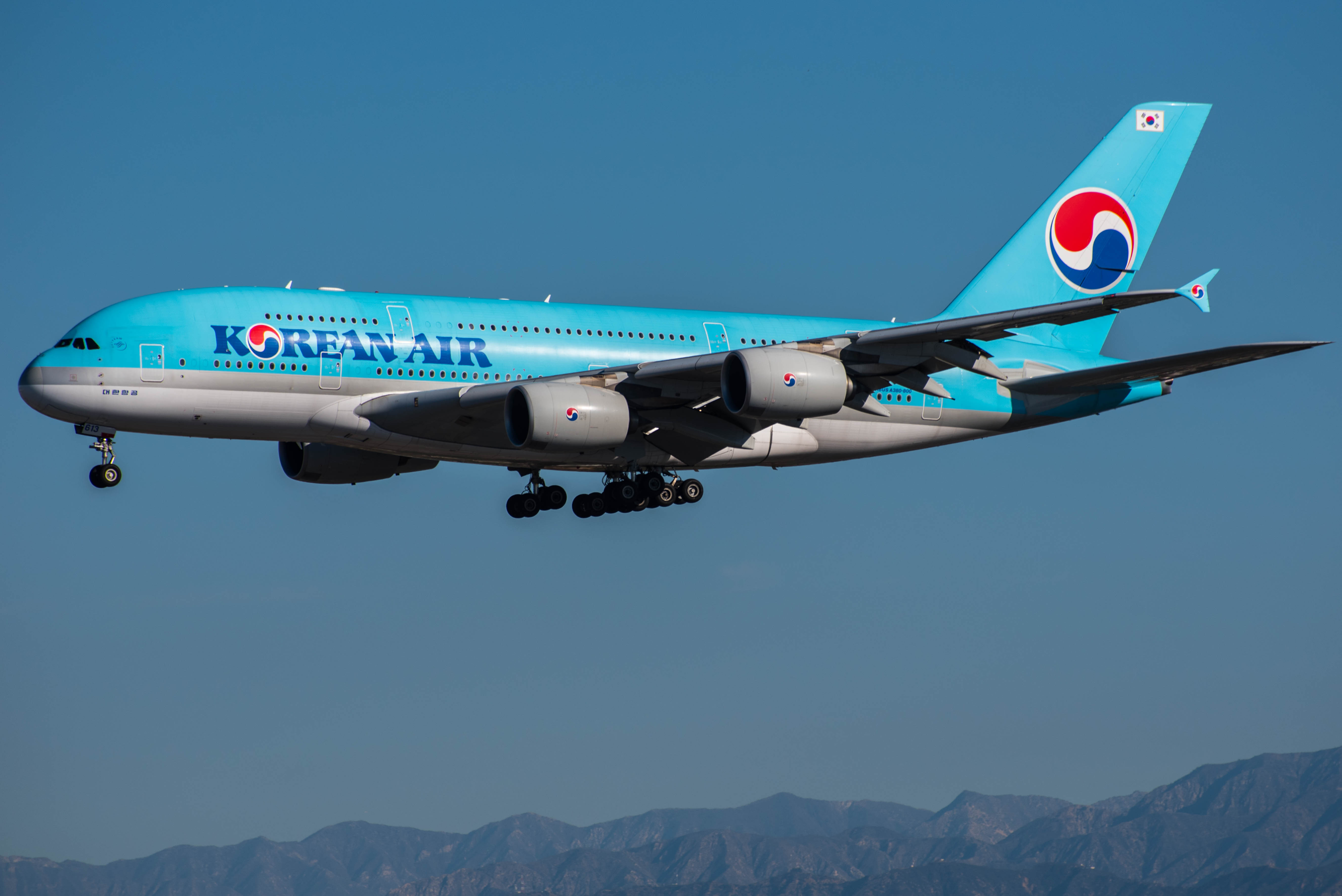
A Korean Air Airbus A380 at Los Angeles International Airport

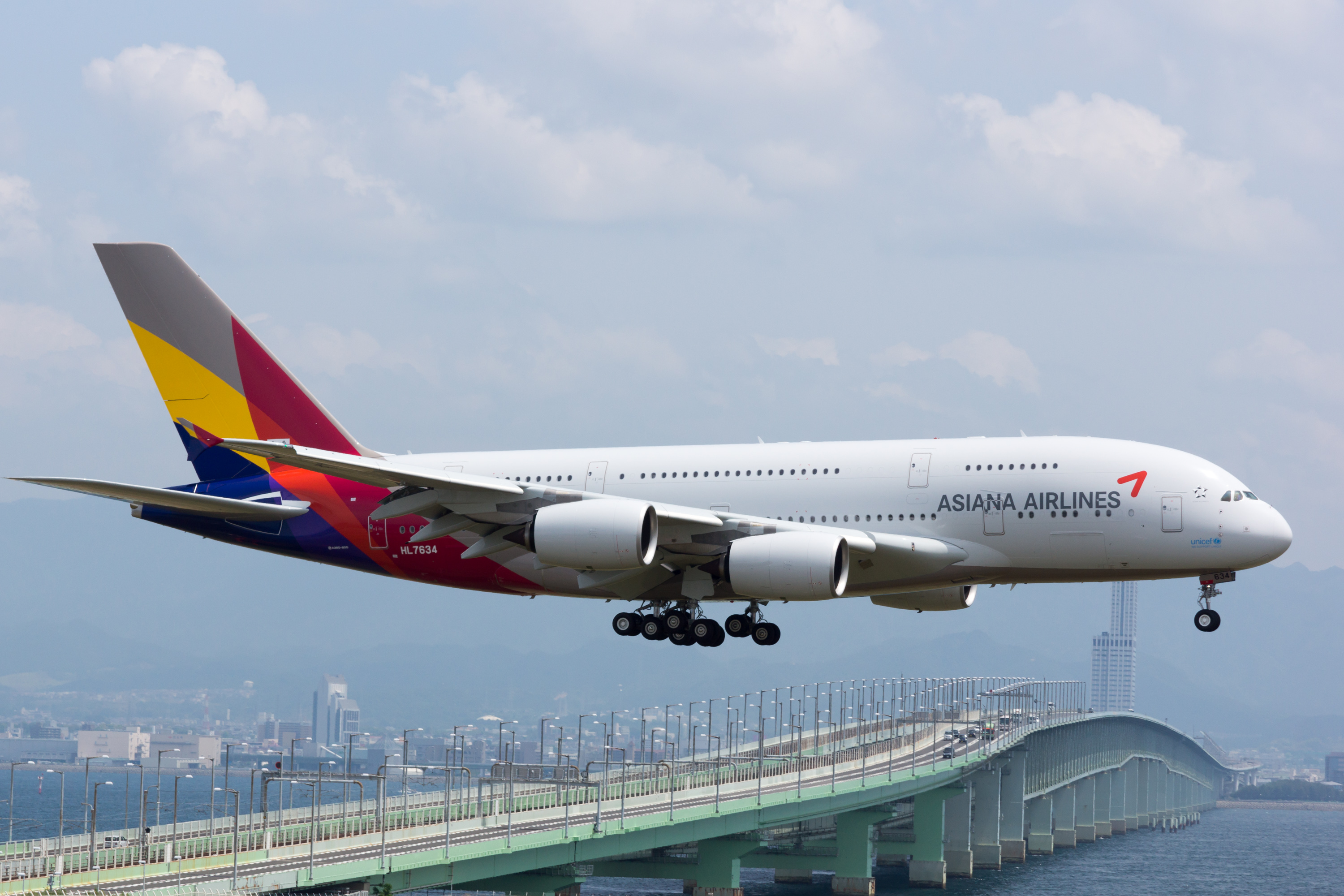
An Asiana Airlines Airbus A380 at Osaka-Kansai International Airport, Japan. (2015)

- Aero K
- Air Busan
- Air Premia
- Air Seoul
- Asiana Airlines
- Eastar Jet
- Hi Air
- Jeju Air
- Jin Air
- Korean Air

==== Kyrgyzstan ====
- Aero Nomad
- Avia Traffic Company
- Air Manas
- TezJet

==== Laos ====
- Lao Airlines
- Lao Skyway

==== Malaysia ====
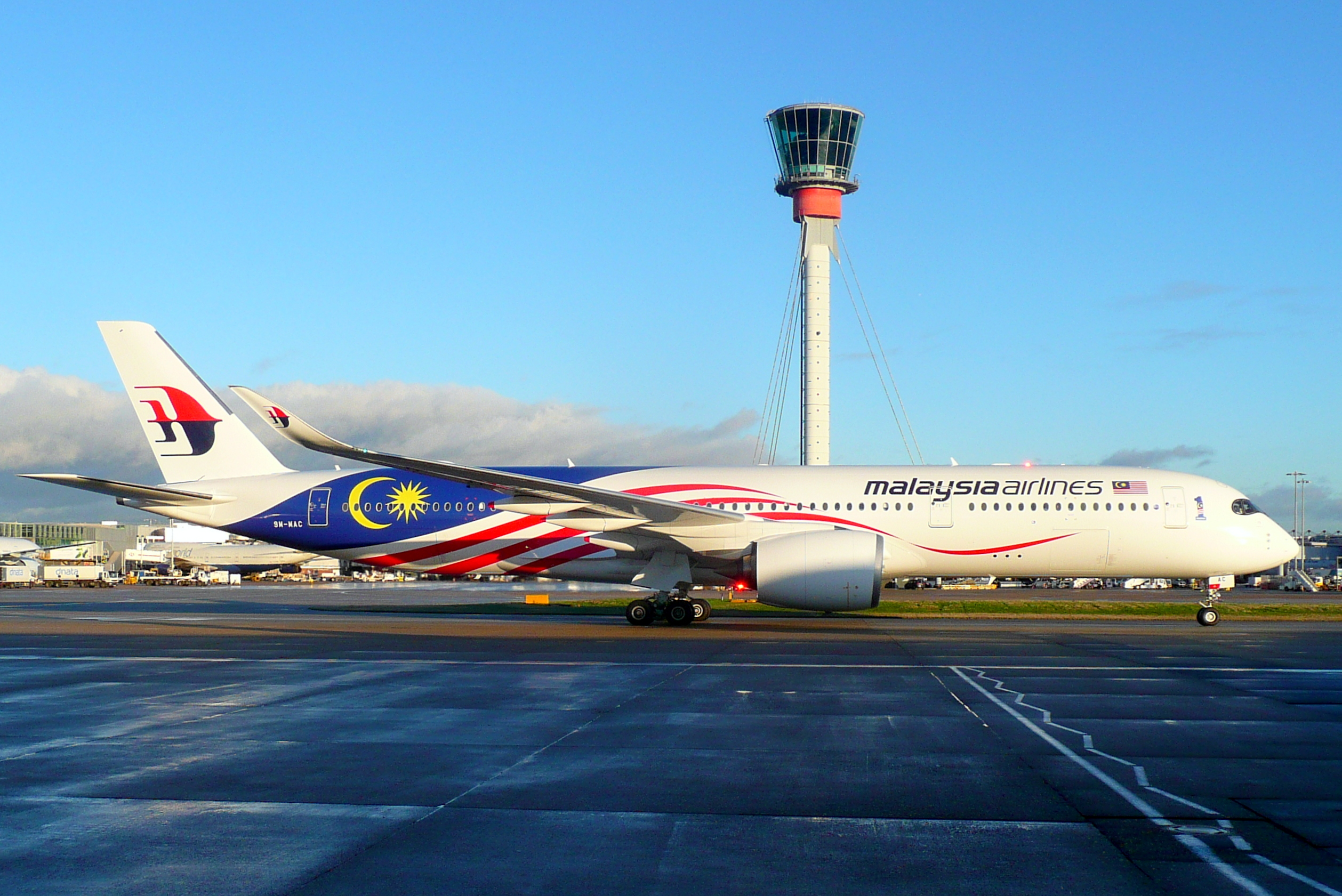
Malaysia Airlines Airbus A350-900

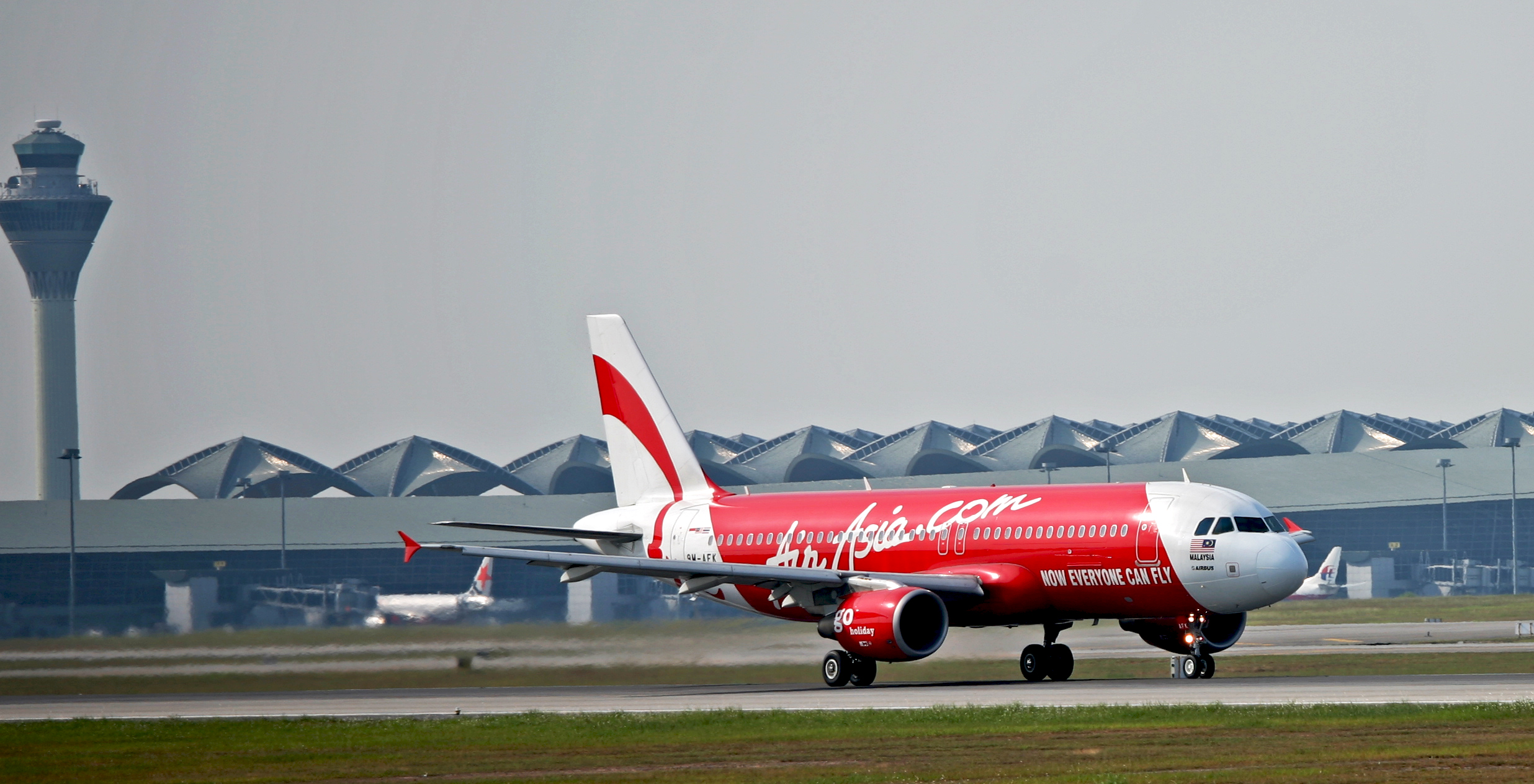
AirAsia Airbus A320 departing Kuala Lumpur International Airport

- AirAsia
- AirAsia X
- Firefly
- Malaysia Airlines
- Air Borneo

==== Maldives ====
- BeOnd
- Flyme
- Maldivian
- Manta Air
- Trans Maldivian Airways

==== Mongolia ====
- Aero Mongolia
- Eznis Airways
- Hunnu Air
- MIAT Mongolian Airlines

==== Myanmar ====
- Air KBZ
- Air Thanlwin
- Golden Myanmar Airlines
- Mann Yadanarpon Airlines
- Myanmar Airways International
- Myanmar National Airlines

==== Nepal ====
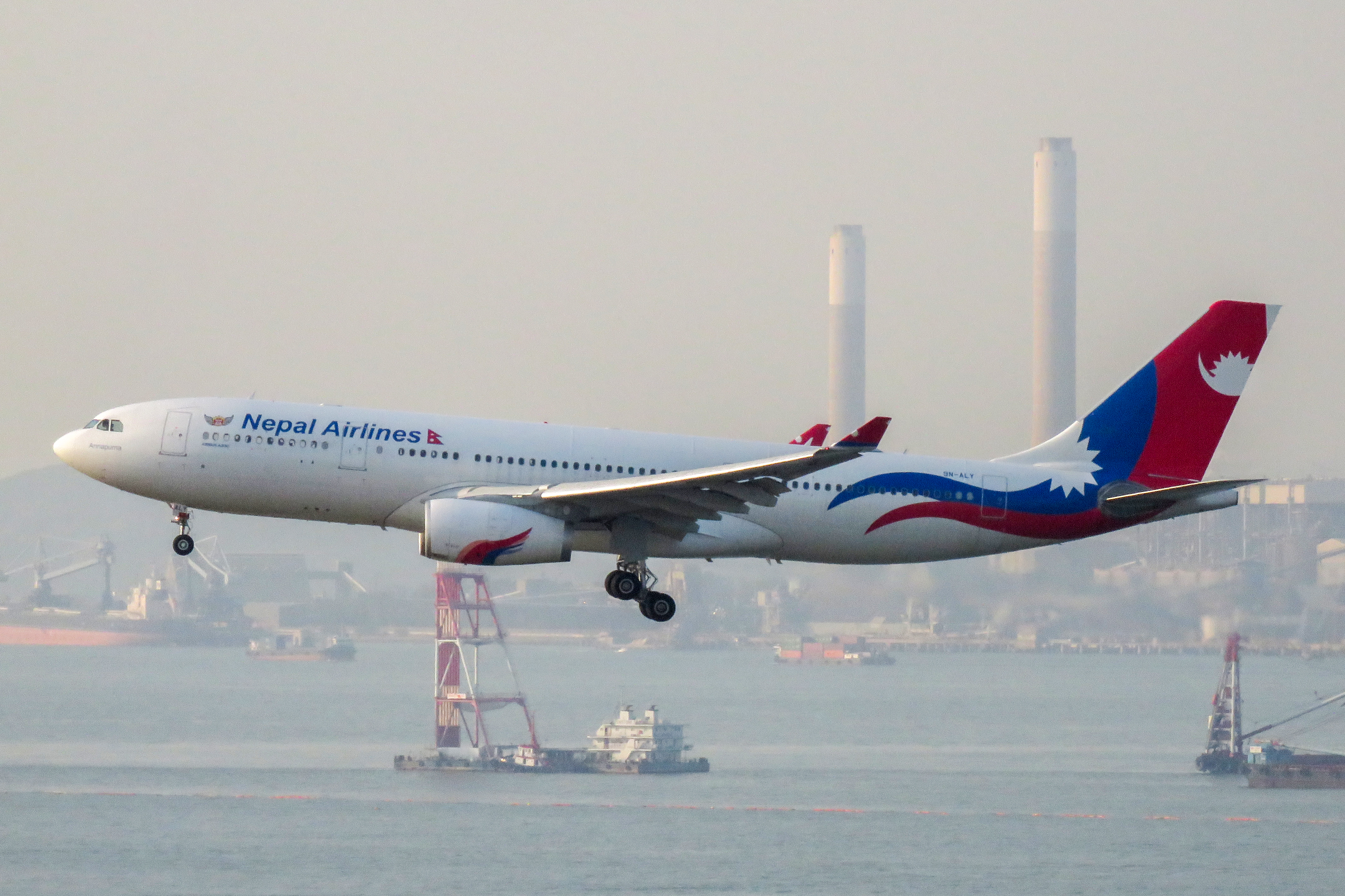
Nepal Airlines Airbus A330-200

- Buddha Air
- Guna Airlines
- Himalaya Airlines
- Nepal Airlines
- Saurya Airlines
- Sita Air
- Shree Airlines
- Tara Air
- Yeti Airlines

==== Pakistan ====
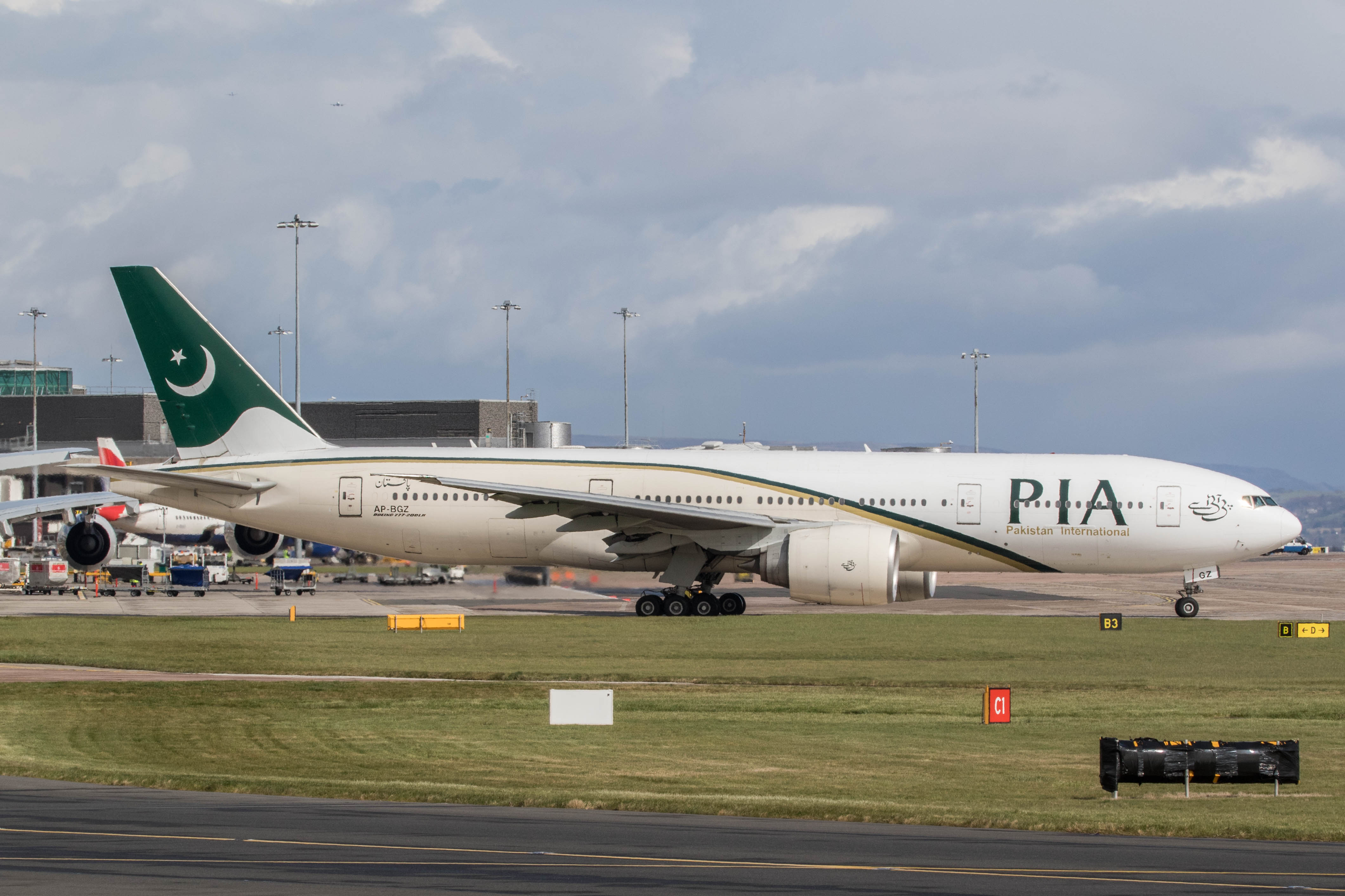
Pakistan International Airlines Boeing 777-200LR

- Airblue
- AirSial
- Fly Jinnah
- Pakistan International Airlines
- SereneAir

==== Philippines ====
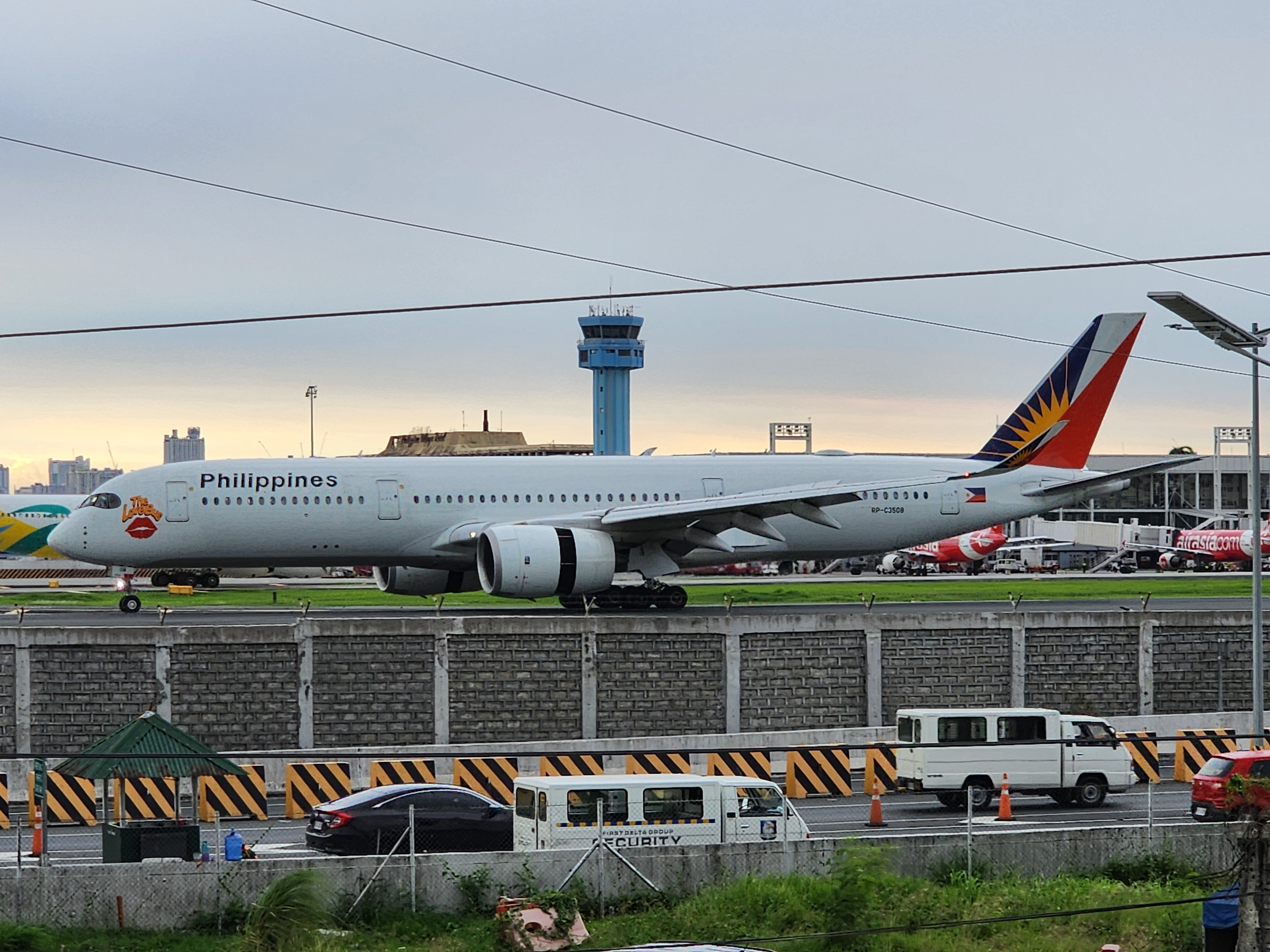
Philippine Airlines Airbus A350-900

- AirSWIFT
- Bangsamoro Airways
- Cebgo
- Cebu Pacific
- Interisland Airlines
- PAL Express
- Philippine Airlines
- Royal Air Philippines
- SkyJet Airlines
- Sunlight Air

==== Singapore ====
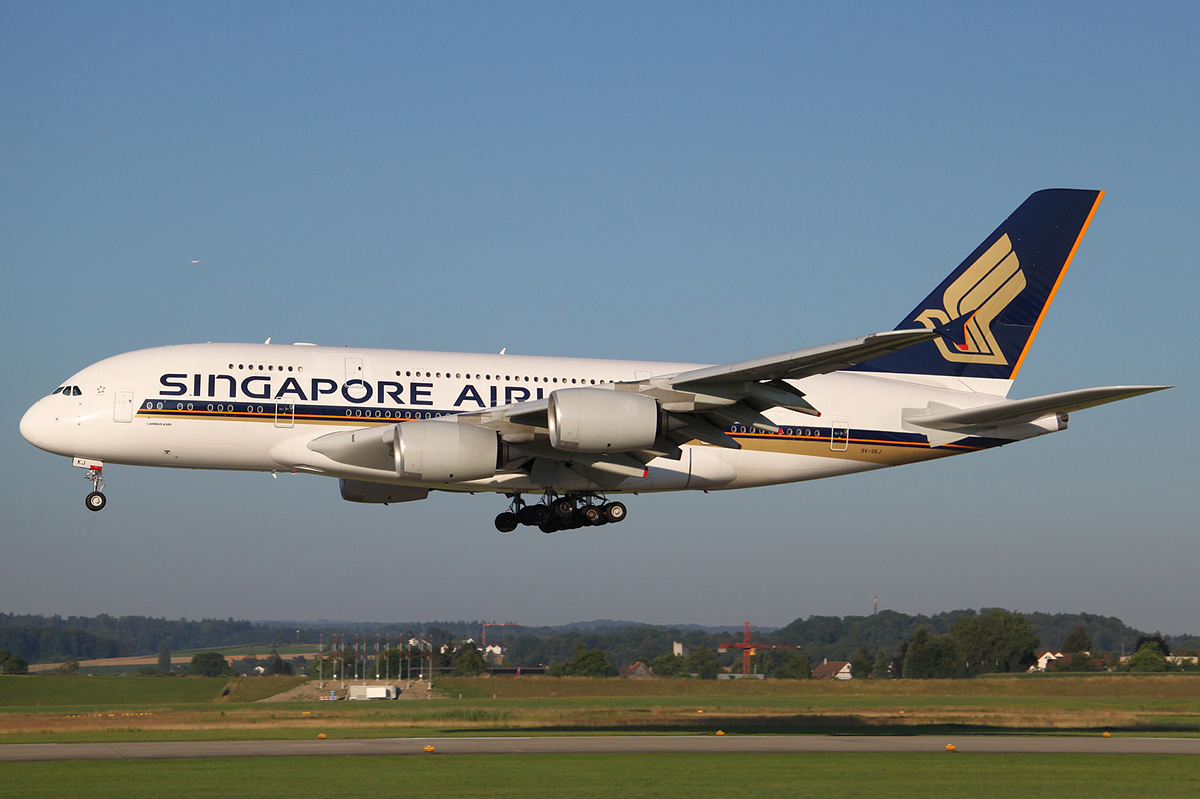
Singapore Airlines Airbus A380-800 at Zurich Airport in 2010

- Scoot
- Singapore Airlines
- Tigerair (Most connections go through Taipei, Taiwan. Nicknamed Tigerair Taiwan.)

==== Sri Lanka ====
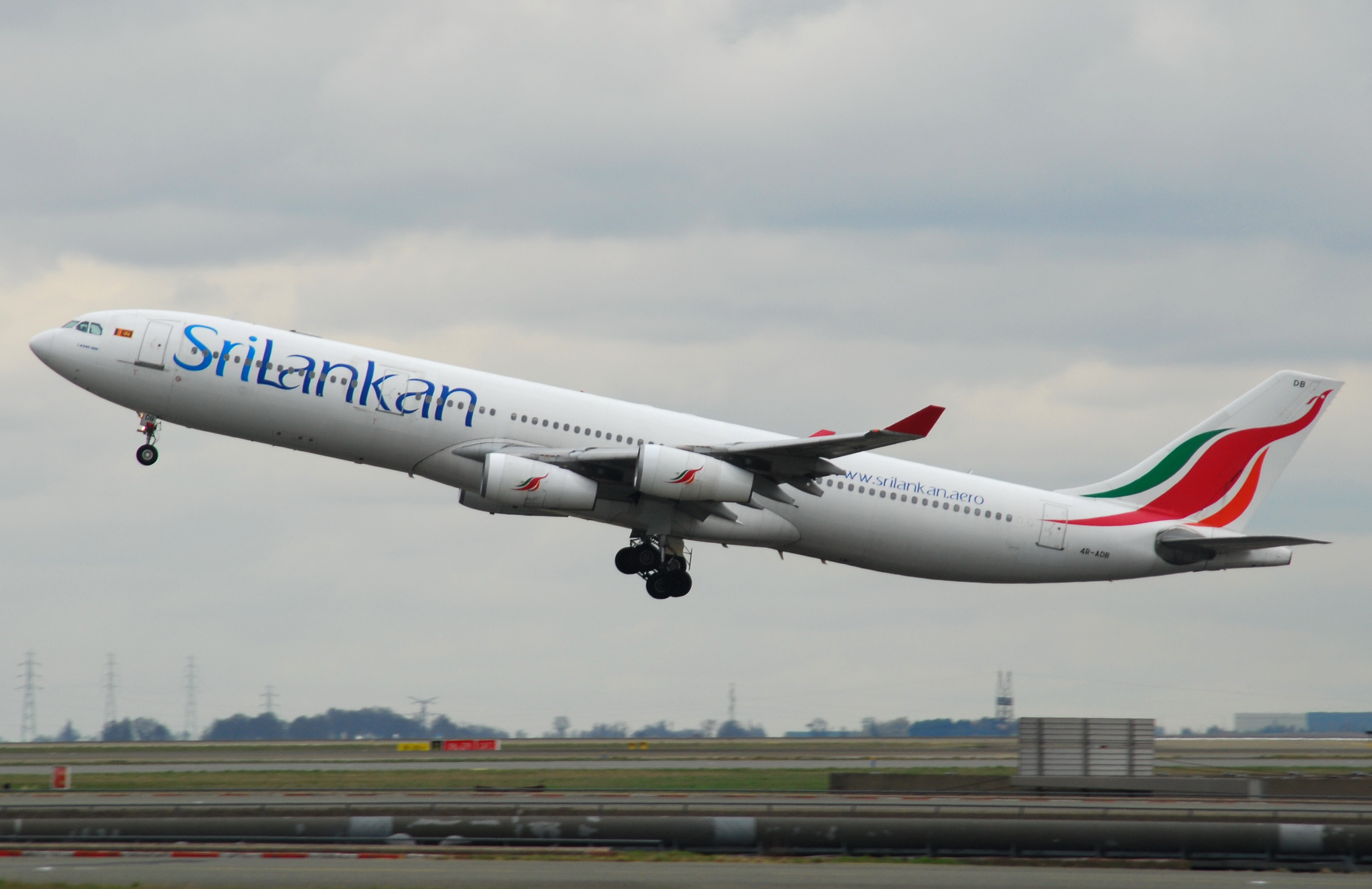
SriLankan Airlines Airbus A340-300

- Cinnamon Air
- FitsAir
- SriLankan Airlines

==== Taiwan ====
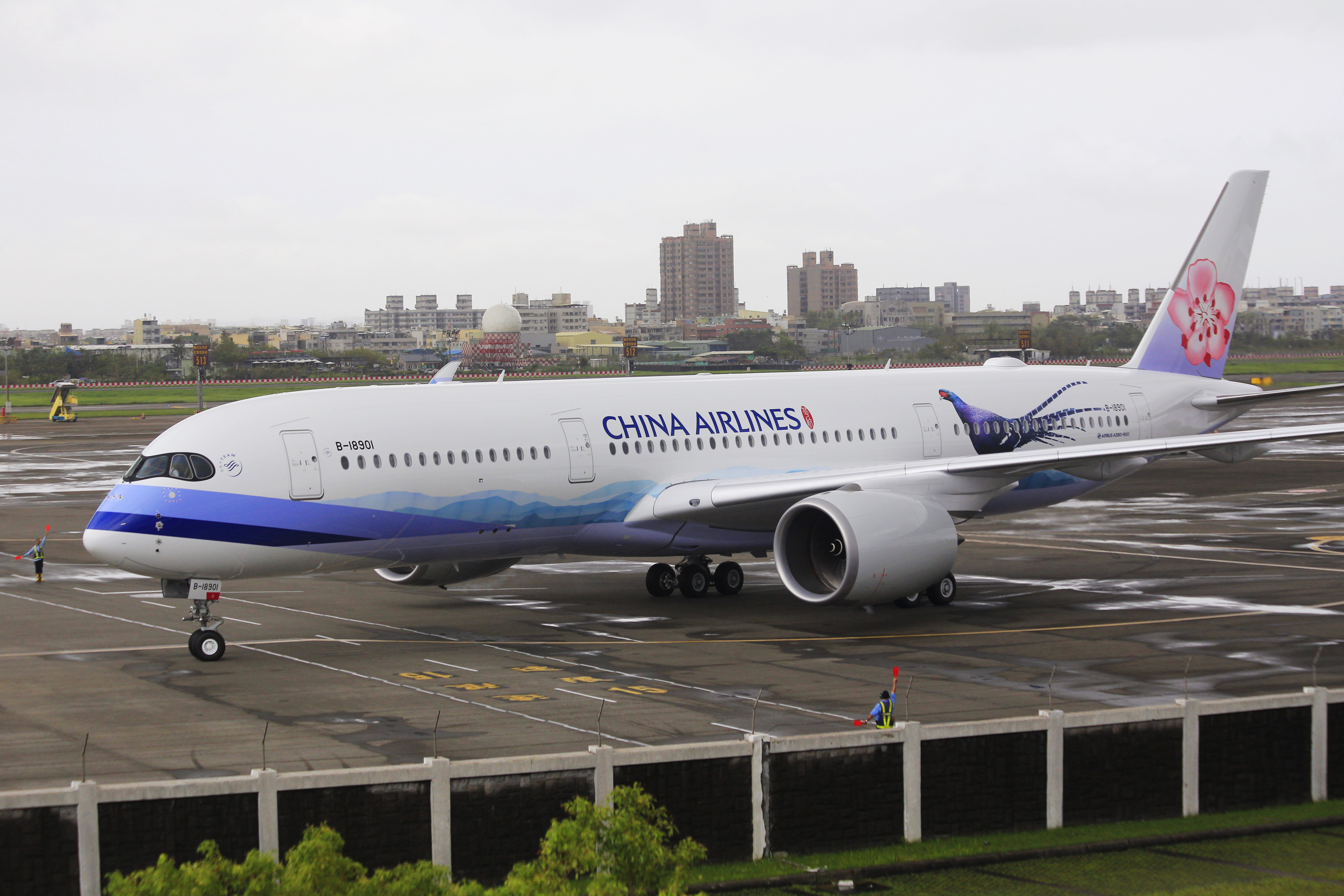
China Airlines Airbus A350 XWB

- China Airlines
- Daily Air
- EVA Air
- Mandarin Airlines
- Starlux Airlines
- Tigerair Taiwan
- Uni Air

==== Tajikistan ====
- Somon Air (Mainly for international flights)
- Tajik Air (formerly for international flights, now for flights within Tajikistan.)

==== Thailand ====
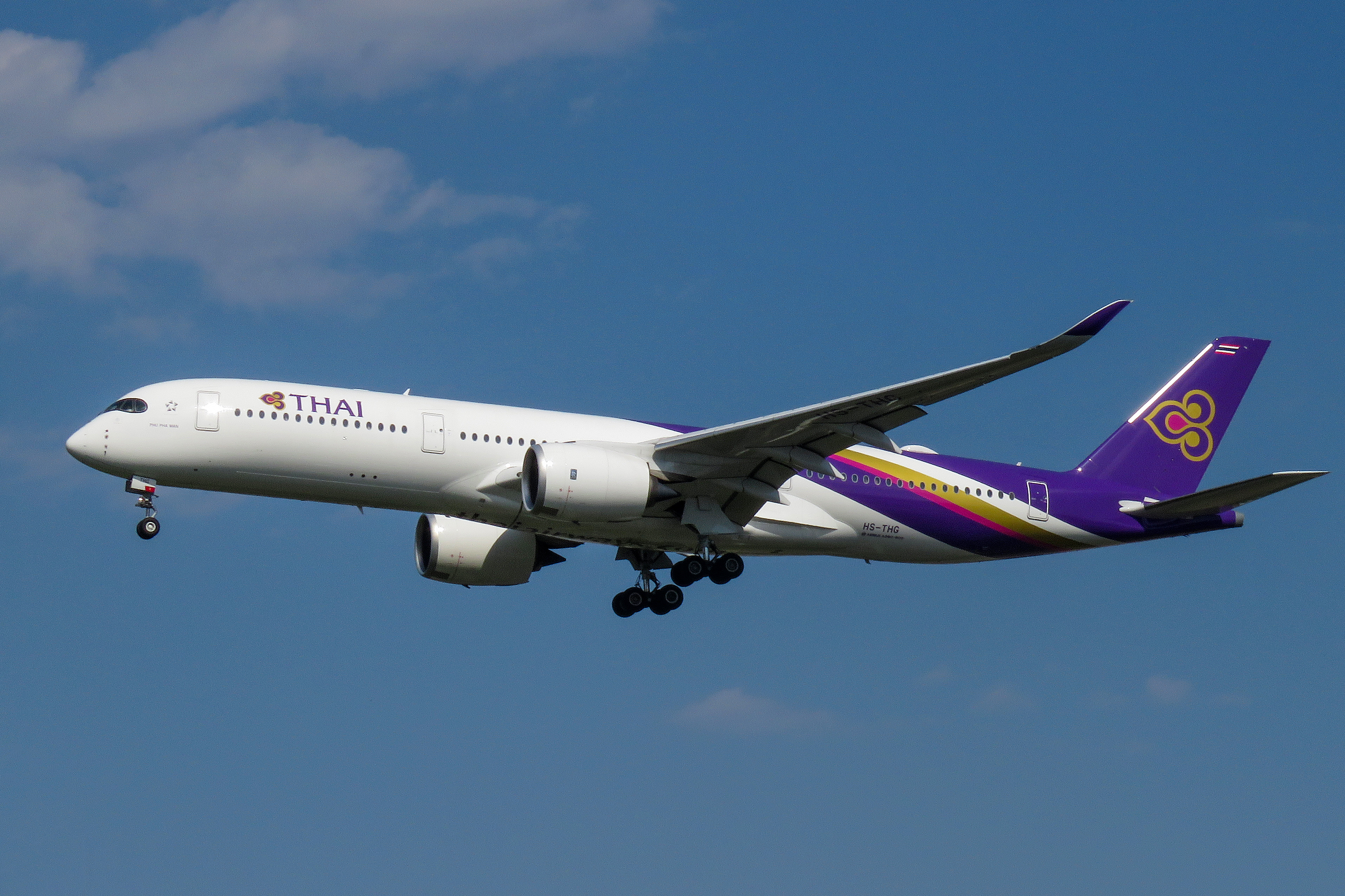
Thai Airways Airbus A350-900

- Bangkok Airways
- Nok Air
- Thai Airways International
- Thai AirAsia
- Thai AirAsia X
- Thai Lion air
- Thai VietJet Air

==== Turkey ====
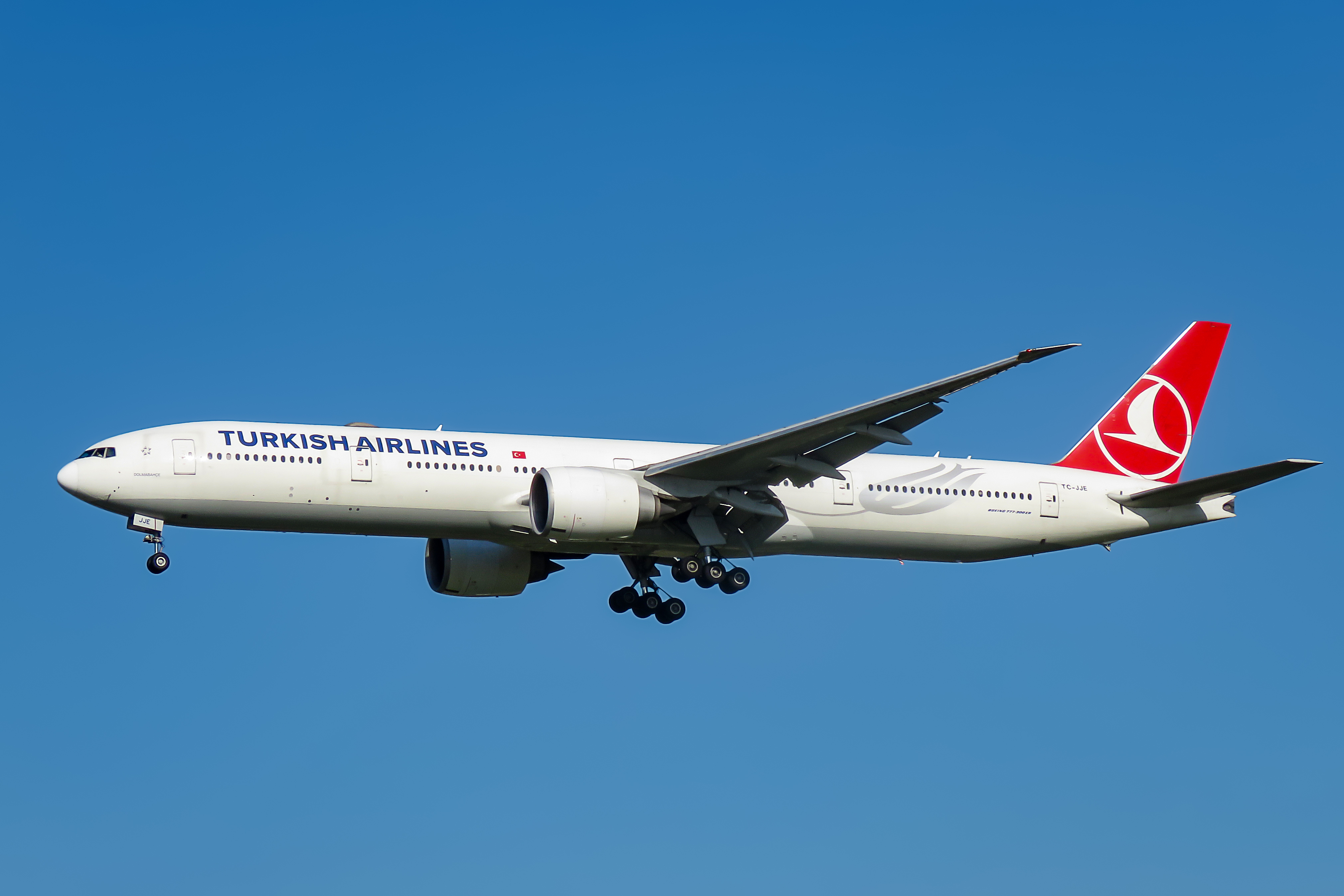
Turkish Airlines Boeing 777-300ER

- AJet
- Corendon Airlines
- Fly Kıbrıs
- Freebird Airlines
- Mavi Gök Airlines
- Pegasus Airlines
- Southwind Airlines
- SunExpress
- Tailwind Airlines
- Turkish Airlines

==== Turkmenistan ====
- Turkmenistan Airlines

==== Uzbekistan ====
- Qanot Sharq Airlines
- Silkavia
- Uzbekistan Airways

==== Vietnam ====
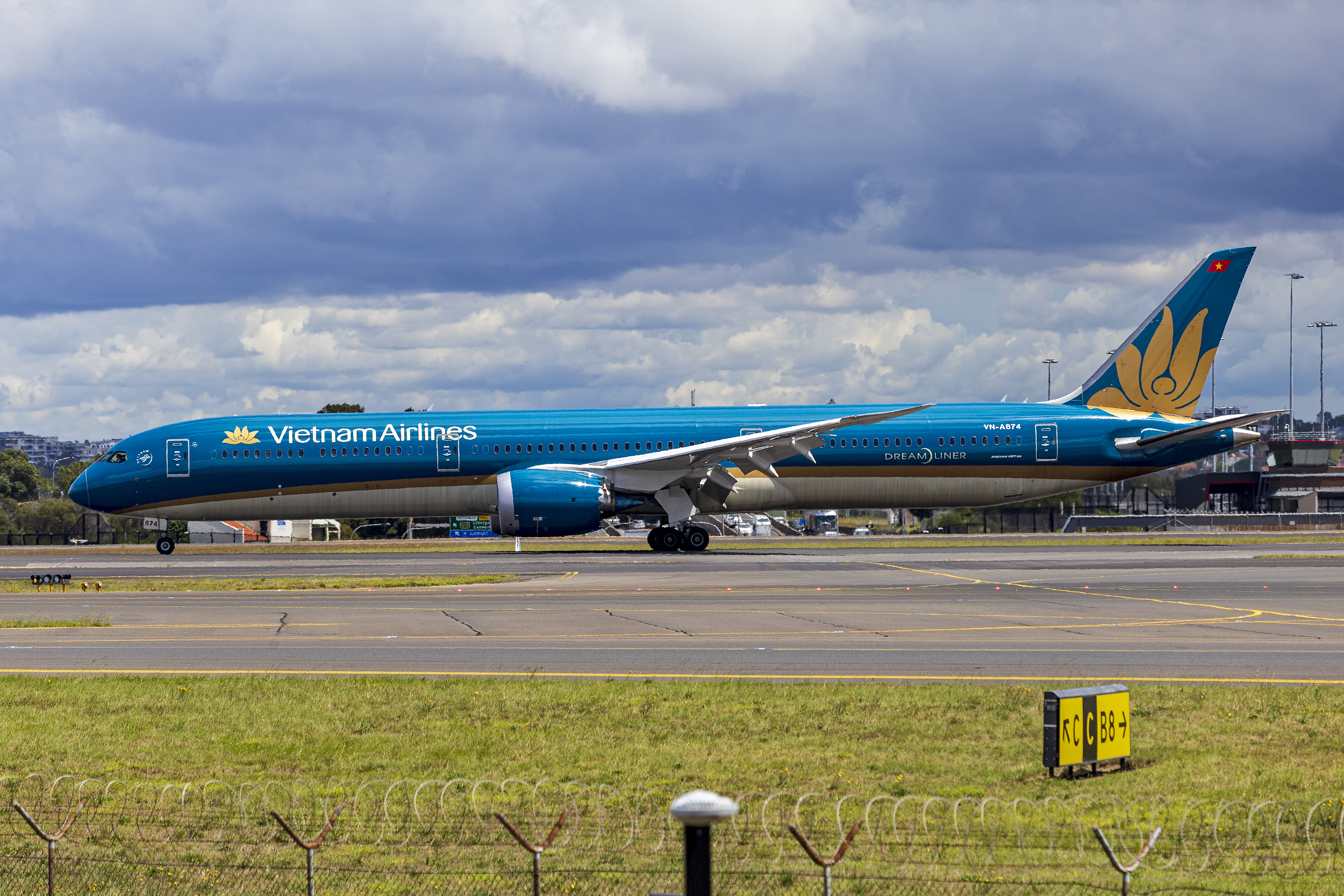
Vietnam Airlines Boeing 787-10

- Bamboo Airways
- Pacific Airlines
- VietJetAir
- Vietnam Air Service Company
- Vietnam Airlines
- Vietravel Airlines

=== Australasia and the Pacific ===
Contents: Top - A B C D E F G H I J K L M N O P Q R S T U V W X Y Z

==== Australia ====
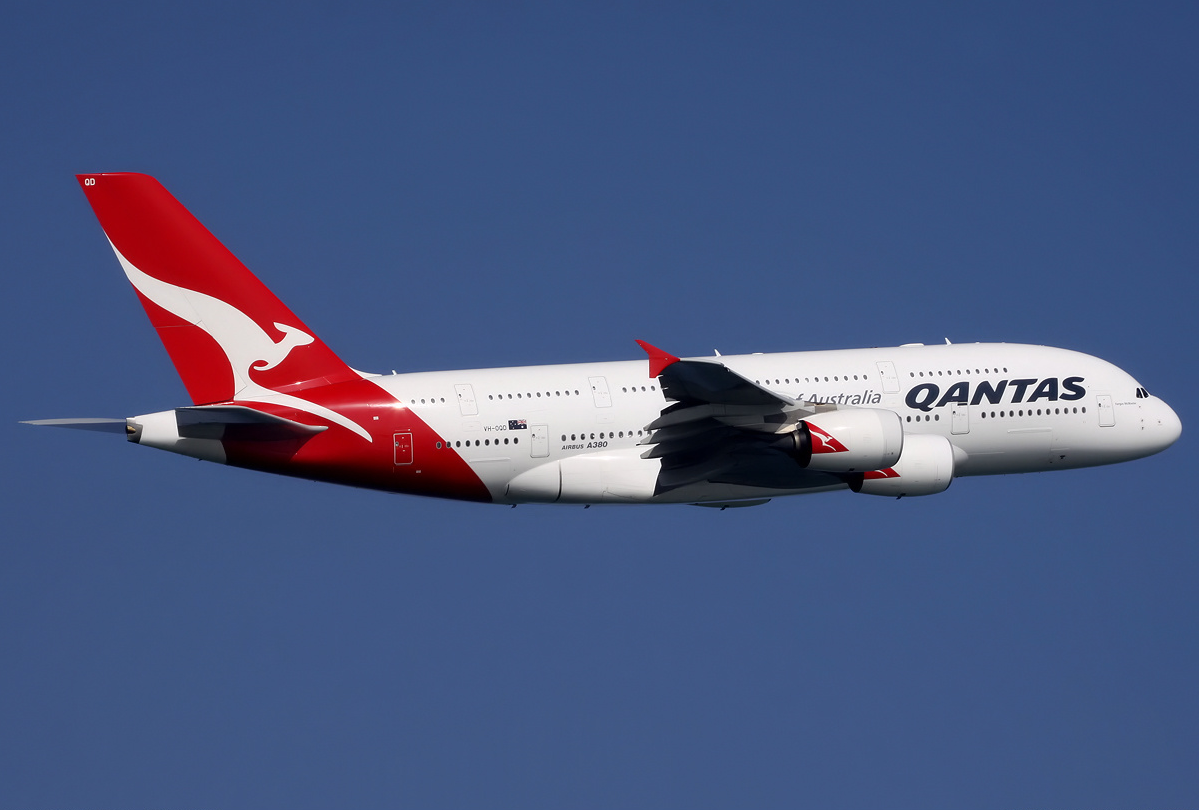
Qantas Airbus A380

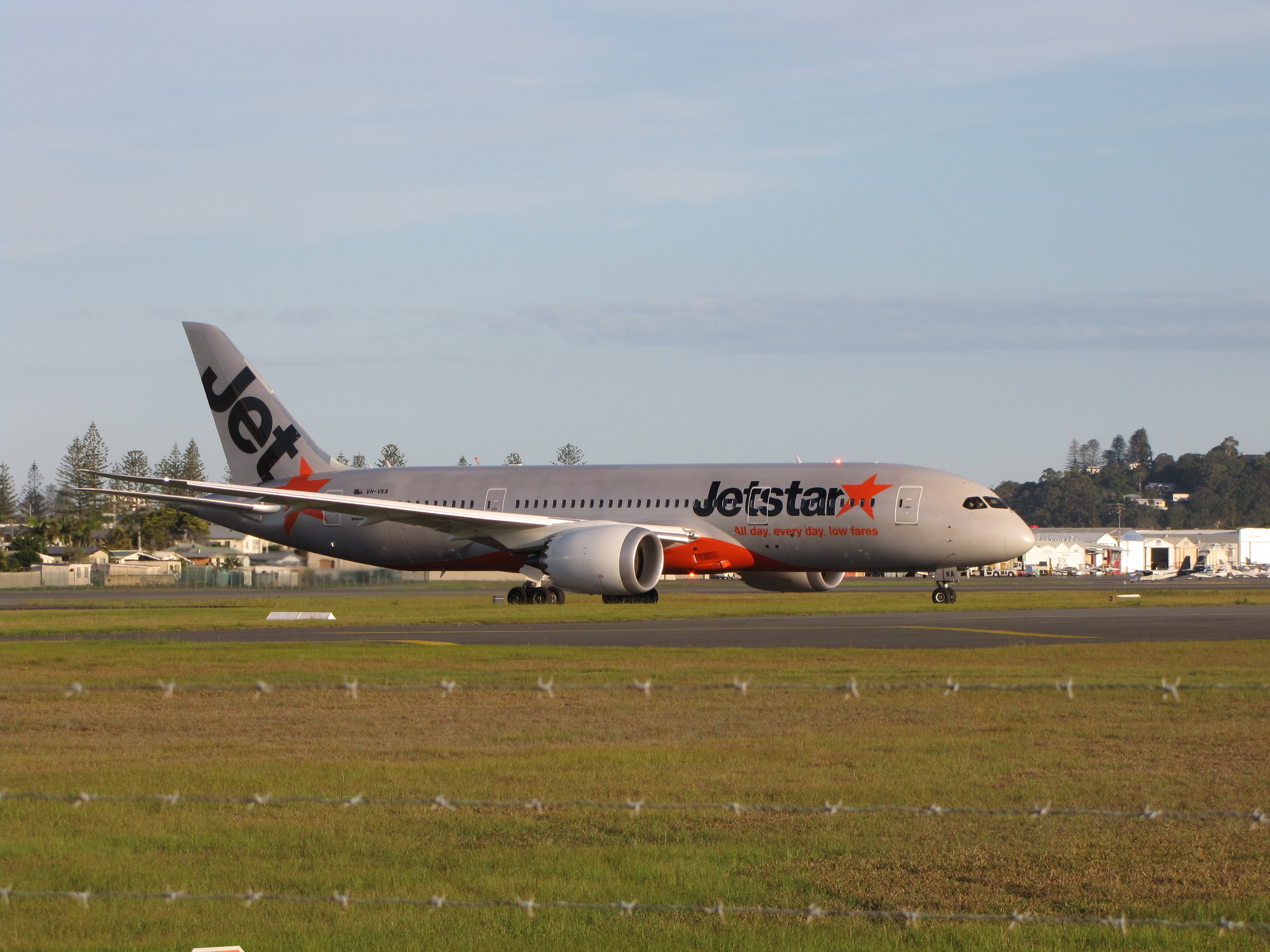
Jetstar's First Boeing 787

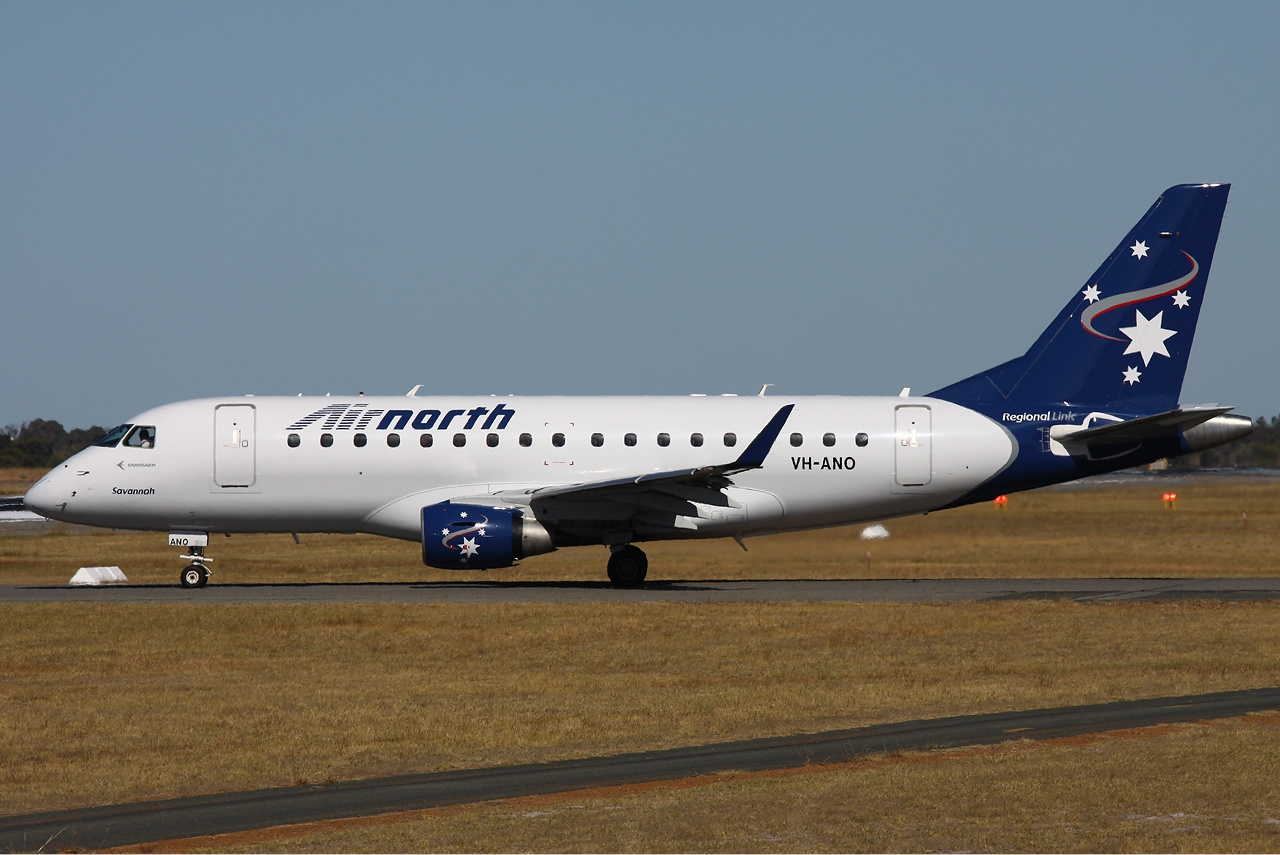
Airnorth Embraer 170 at Perth Airport

- Air Link
- Airnorth
- Alliance Airlines
- Aviair
- Eastern Australia Airlines
- Jetstar
- Link Airways
- Maroomba Airlines
- National Jet Systems
- Network Aviation
- Nexus Airlines
- Qantas
- QantasLink
- Rex Airlines
- Skippers Aviation
- Skytrans Airlines
- Sunstate Airlines
- Virgin Australia
- Virgin Australia Regional Airlines

==== Cook Islands ====
- Air Rarotonga

==== Fiji ====
- Fiji Airways
- Fiji Link

==== French Polynesia ====
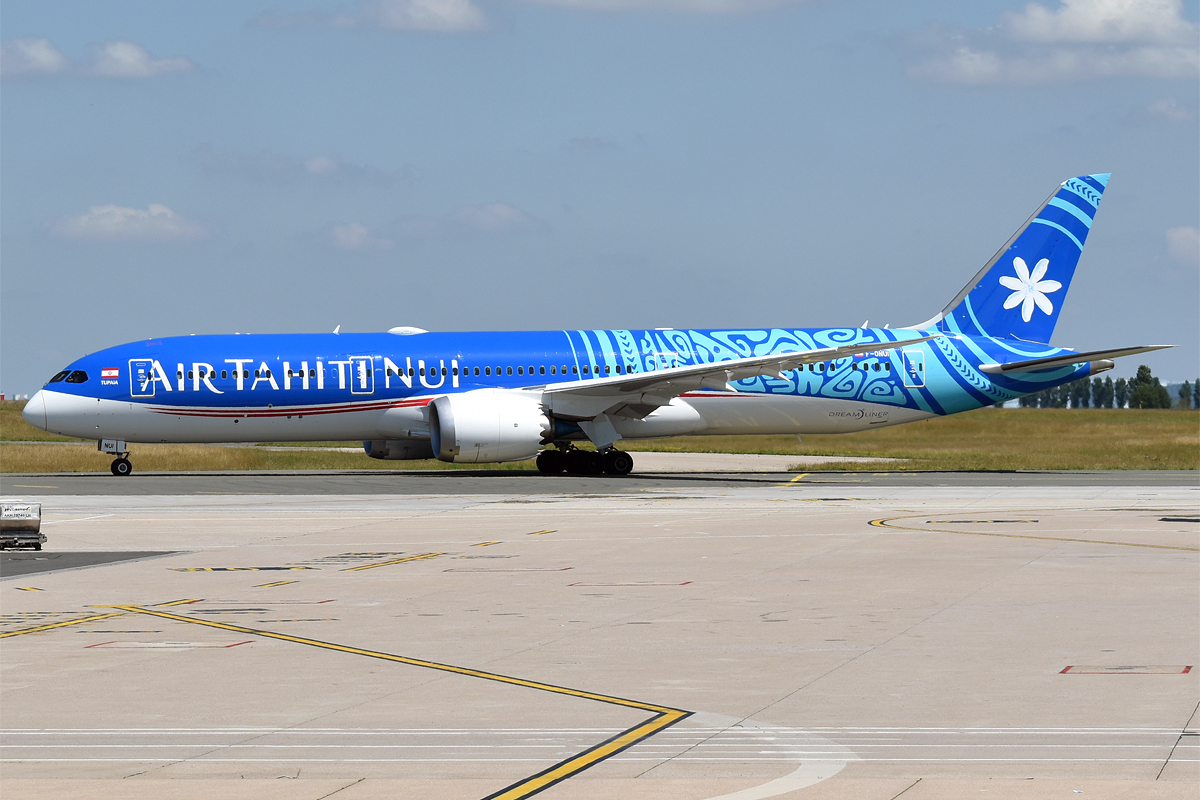
Air Tahiti Nui Boeing 787-9

- Air Moana
- Air Tahiti
- Air Tahiti Nui

==== Kiribati ====
- Air Kiribati

==== Marshall Islands ====
- Air Marshall Islands

==== Nauru ====
- Nauru Airlines

==== New Caledonia ====
- Air Calédonie
- Aircalin
- Air Loyauté

==== New Zealand ====
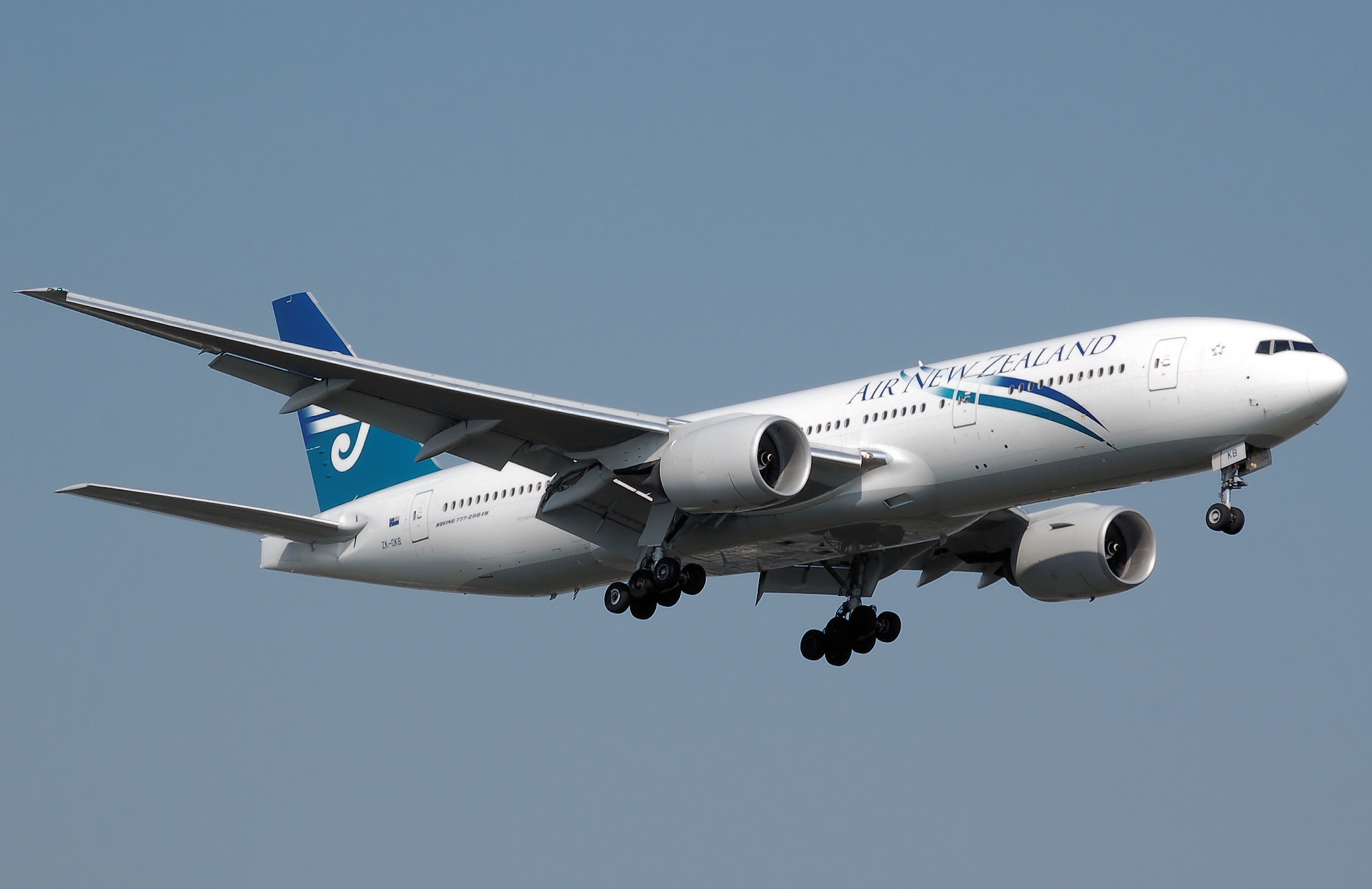
Air New Zealand Boeing 777-200ER

- Air Chathams
- Air New Zealand
- Sounds Air

==== Palau ====
- Belau Air

==== Papua New Guinea ====
- Air Niugini
- Asia Pacific Airlines
- Link PNG
- PNG Air

==== Samoa ====
- Samoa Airways

==== Solomon Islands ====
- Solomon Airlines

==== Tonga ====
- Lulutai Airlines

==== Tuvalu ====
- Air Tuvalu (launching October 2023)

==== Vanuatu ====
- Air Vanuatu

=== The Caribbean and Central America ===
Contents: Top - A B C D E F G H I J K L M N O P Q R S T U V W X Y Z

==== Anguilla ====
- Anguilla Air Services
- Trans Anguilla Airways

==== Antigua and Barbuda ====
- LIAT

==== Aruba ====
- Aruba Airlines

==== Bahamas ====
- Bahamasair
- Titanair
- Western Air

==== Belize ====
- Maya Island Air
- Tropic Air

==== Bermuda ====
- BermudAir

==== Cayman Islands ====
- Cayman Airways

==== Costa Rica ====
- Sansa Airlines

==== Cuba ====
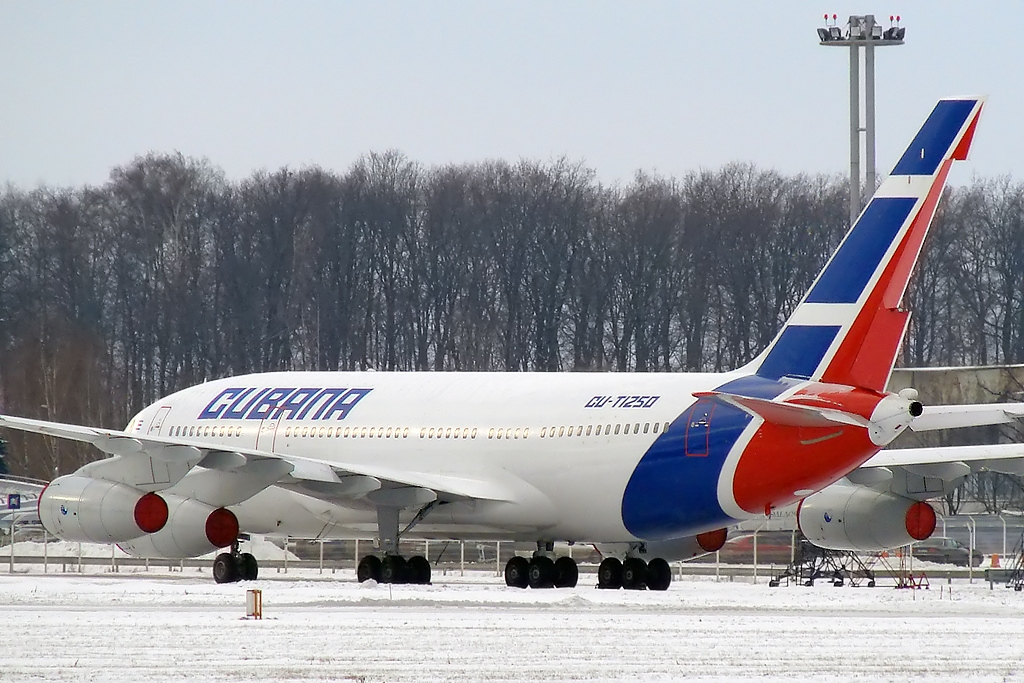
Cubana Ilyushin 96

- Aerogaviota
- Cubana

==== Curaçao ====
- E-Liner Airways

==== Dominican Republic ====
- Air Century
- Arajet
- RED Air
- SKYhigh Dominicana

==== Guadeloupe ====
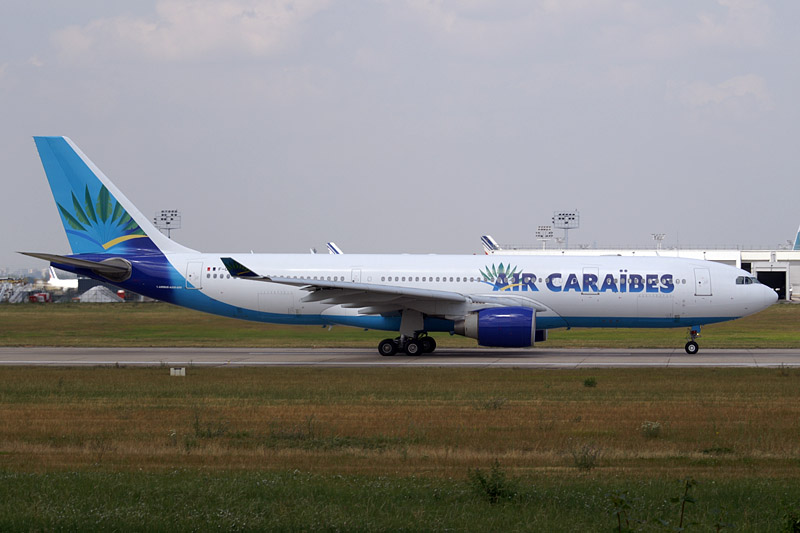
Air Caraibes Airbus A330-200

- Air Antilles
- Air Caraïbes

==== Guatemala ====
- TAG Airlines

==== Haiti ====
- Sunrise Airways

==== Honduras ====
- Aerolíneas Sosa
- AVIATSA
- Lanhsa Airlines

==== Montserrat ====
- FlyMontserrat

==== Nicaragua ====
- La Costeña

==== Panama ====
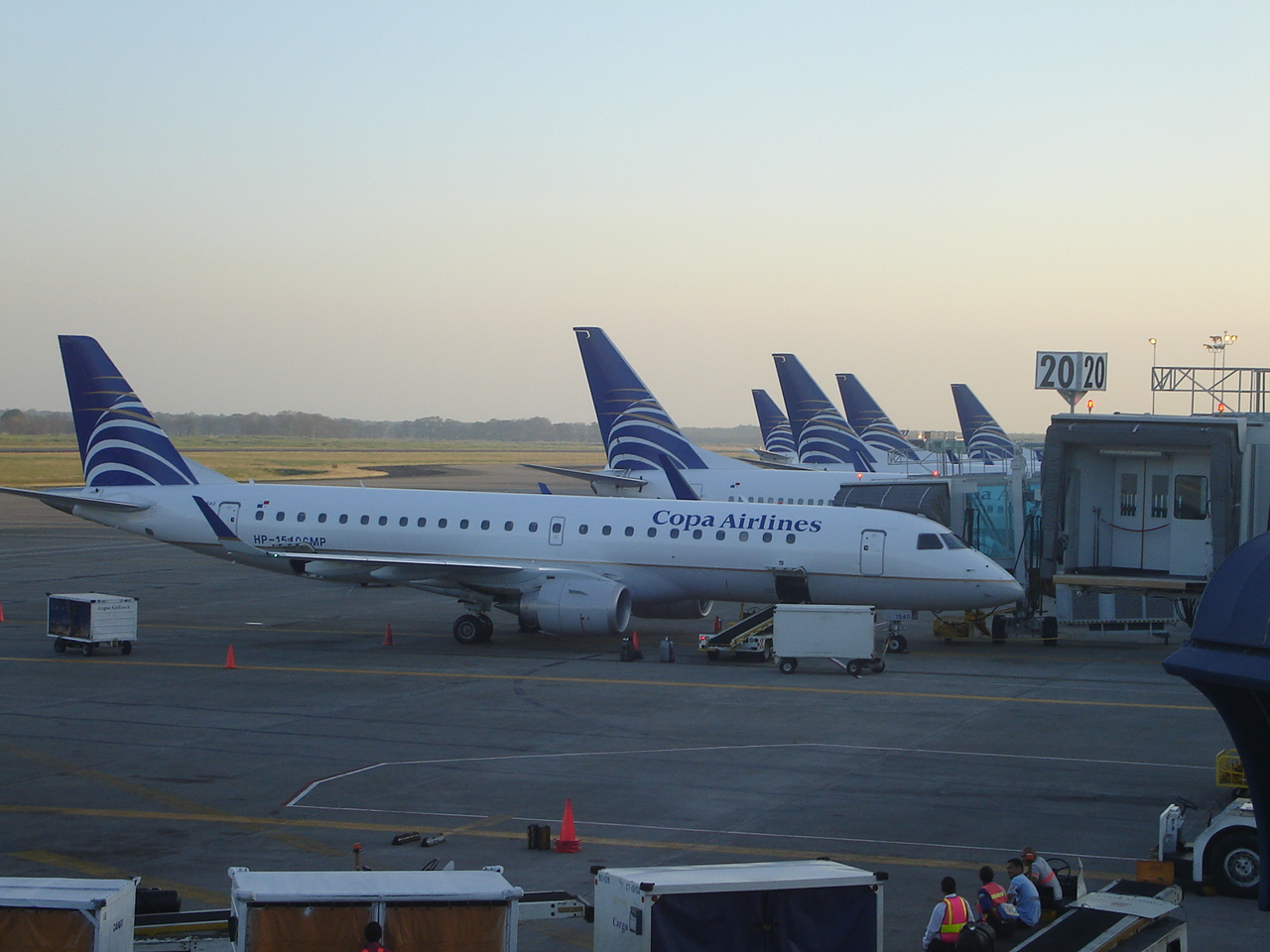
Copa Airlines Embraer E-195

- Air Panama
- Copa Airlines

==== Puerto Rico ====
- Air Flamenco
- Seaborne Airlines
- Vieques Air Link

==== Saint Barthélemy ====
- St Barth Commuter

==== Saint Martin ====
- Winair

==== Saint Vincent and the Grenadines ====
- SVG Air
- Air Adelphi

==== Sint Maarten ====
- Winair

==== Trinidad and Tobago ====
- Caribbean Airlines

==== Turks and Caicos Islands ====
- InterCaribbean Airways

=== Europe ===
Contents: Top - A B C D E F G H I J K L M N O P Q R S T U V W X Y Z

==== Albania ====
- Air Albania

==== Austria ====
- Austrian Airlines
- People's

==== Belarus ====
- Belavia

==== Belgium ====
- Brussels Airlines
- TUI fly Belgium

==== Bulgaria ====
- Bulgaria Air

==== Croatia ====
- Croatia Airlines
- Trade Air

==== Cyprus ====
- Cyprus Airways
- Tus Airways

==== Czech Republic ====
- Czech Airlines
- SmartWings

==== Denmark ====
For Danish territories with home rule, see Faroe Islands and Greenland.

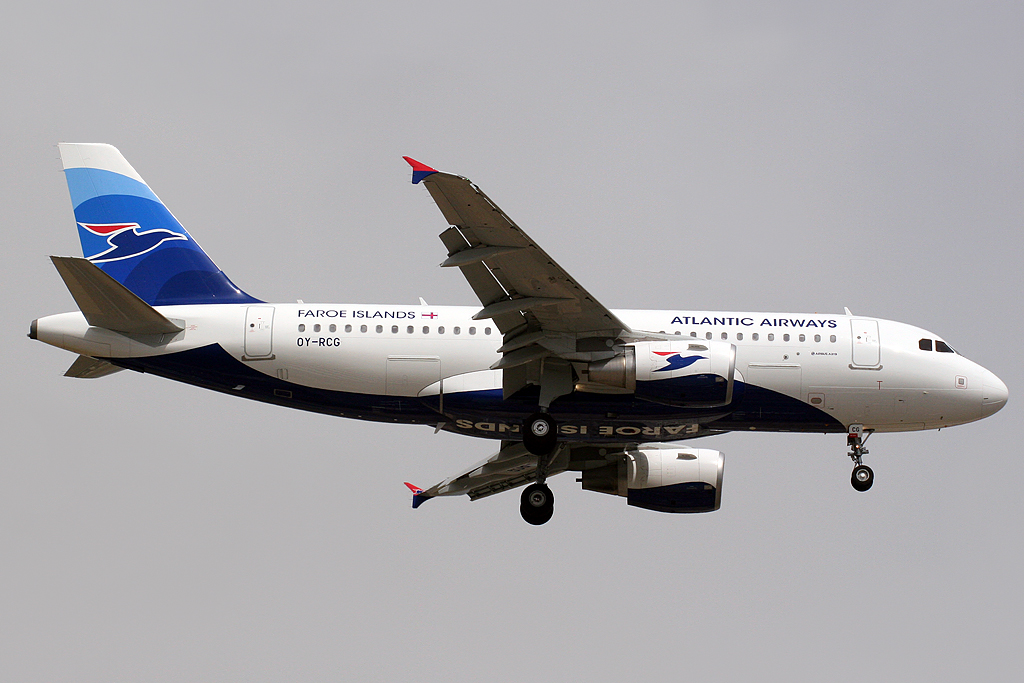
Atlantic Airways Airbus A319 landing at Barcelona–El Prat Airport, Spain

- Alsie Express
- Copenhagen Air Taxi
- Danish Air Transport
- SUN-AIR of Scandinavia (British Airways)

==== Estonia ====
- Marabu Airlines
- Nordica
- NyxAir

==== Faroe Islands ====
- Atlantic Airways

==== Finland ====
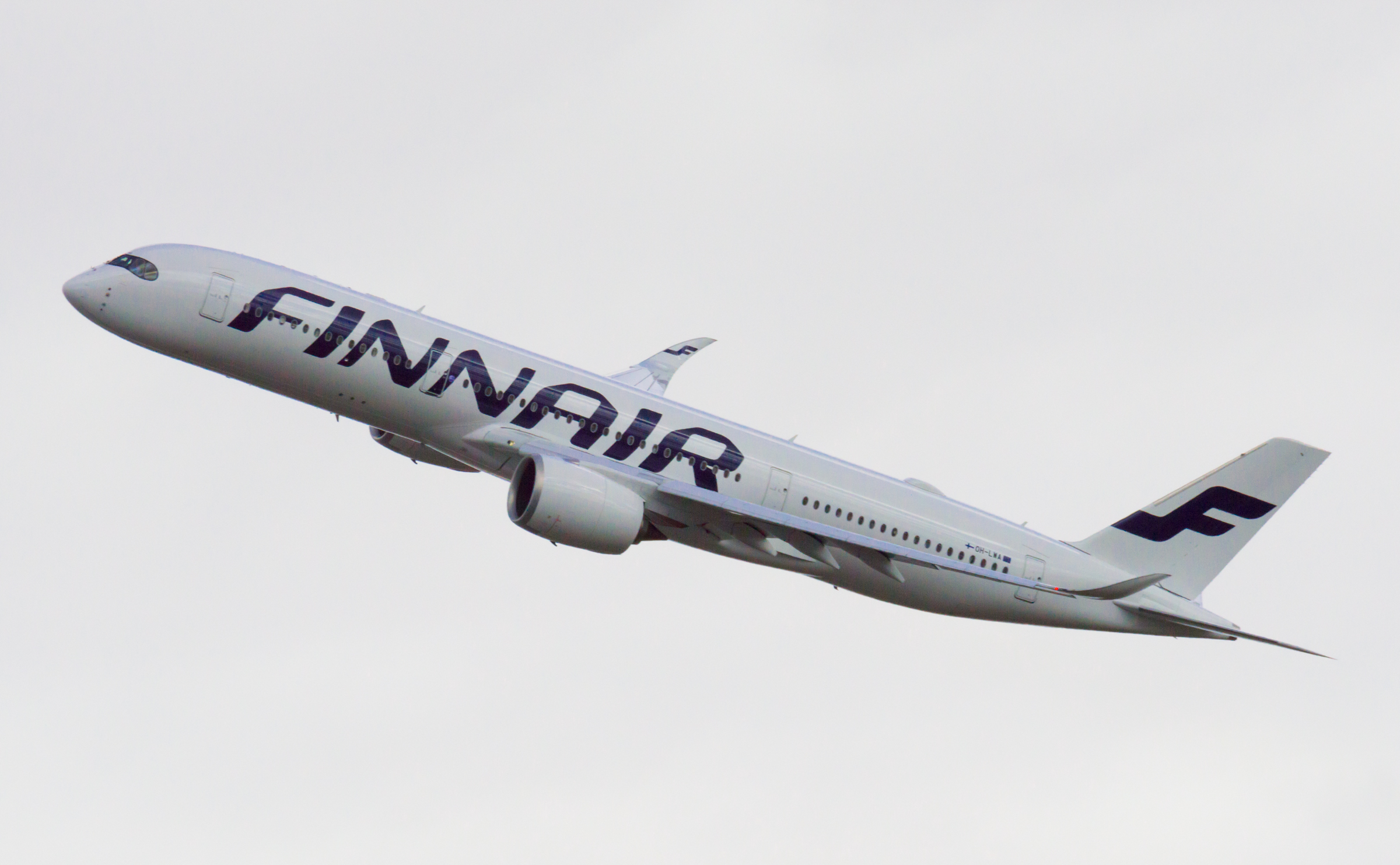
A Finnair Airbus A350-900

- Finnair
- Nordic Regional Airlines (Finnair)

==== France ====
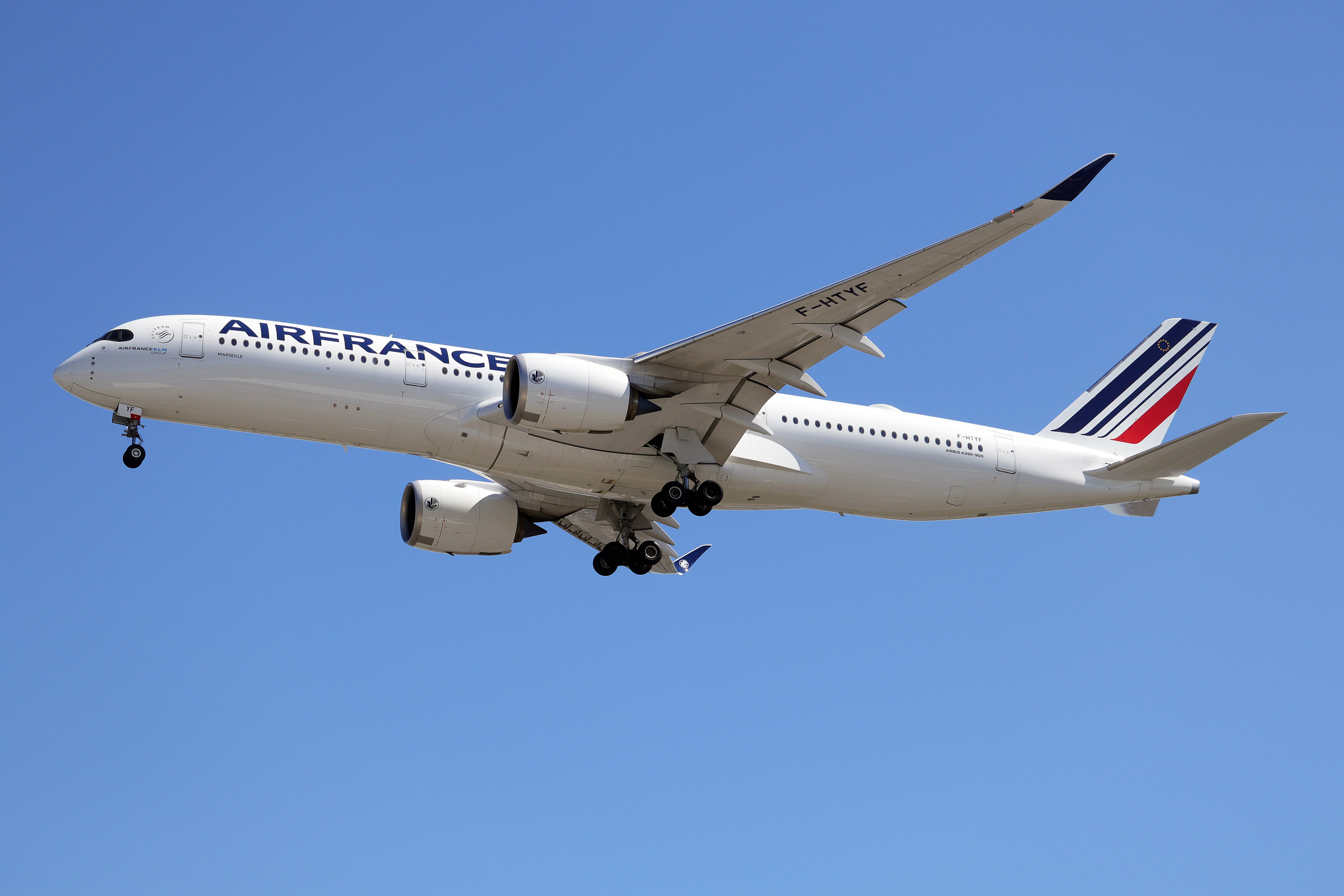
An Air France Airbus A350-900 at Toronto Pearson International Airport

For DOMs/TOMs, see the sections for French Guiana, French Polynesia, Guadeloupe, New Caledonia, Réunion, Saint-Pierre and Miquelon.

- Air Corsica
- Air France
- Air France Hop
- Amelia International
- ASL Airlines France
- Chalair Aviation
- Corsair
- Finist'air
- French Bee
- La Compagnie
- Lorizon Aircraft
- Twin Jet
- Air Austral

==== Germany ====
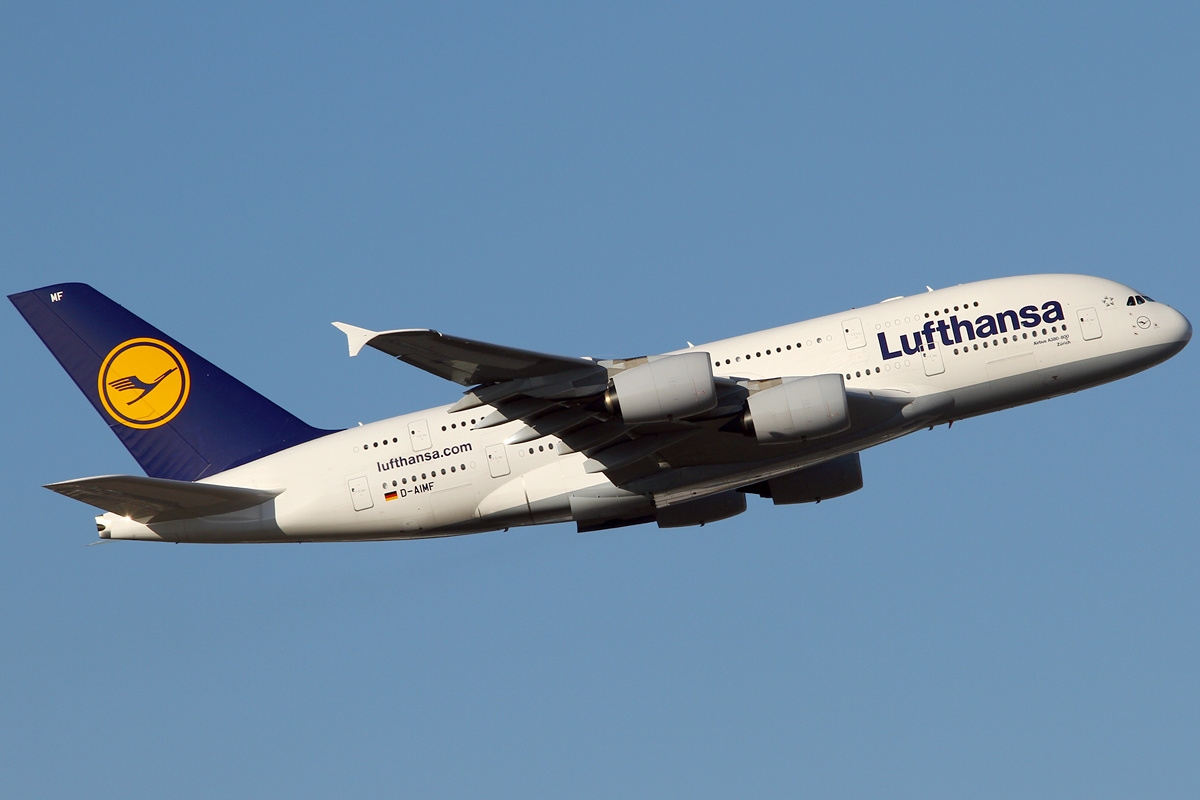
An Airbus A380 operated by Lufthansa

- Aero Dienst
- Avanti Air
- Condor
- Eurowings
- FLN Frisia Luftverkehr
- Lufthansa
- Lufthansa CityLine
- OFD Ostfriesischer-Flug-Dienst
- Private Wings Flugcharter
- Sundair
- Sylt Air
- TUI fly Deutschland
- Lufthansa Cargo

==== Greece ====
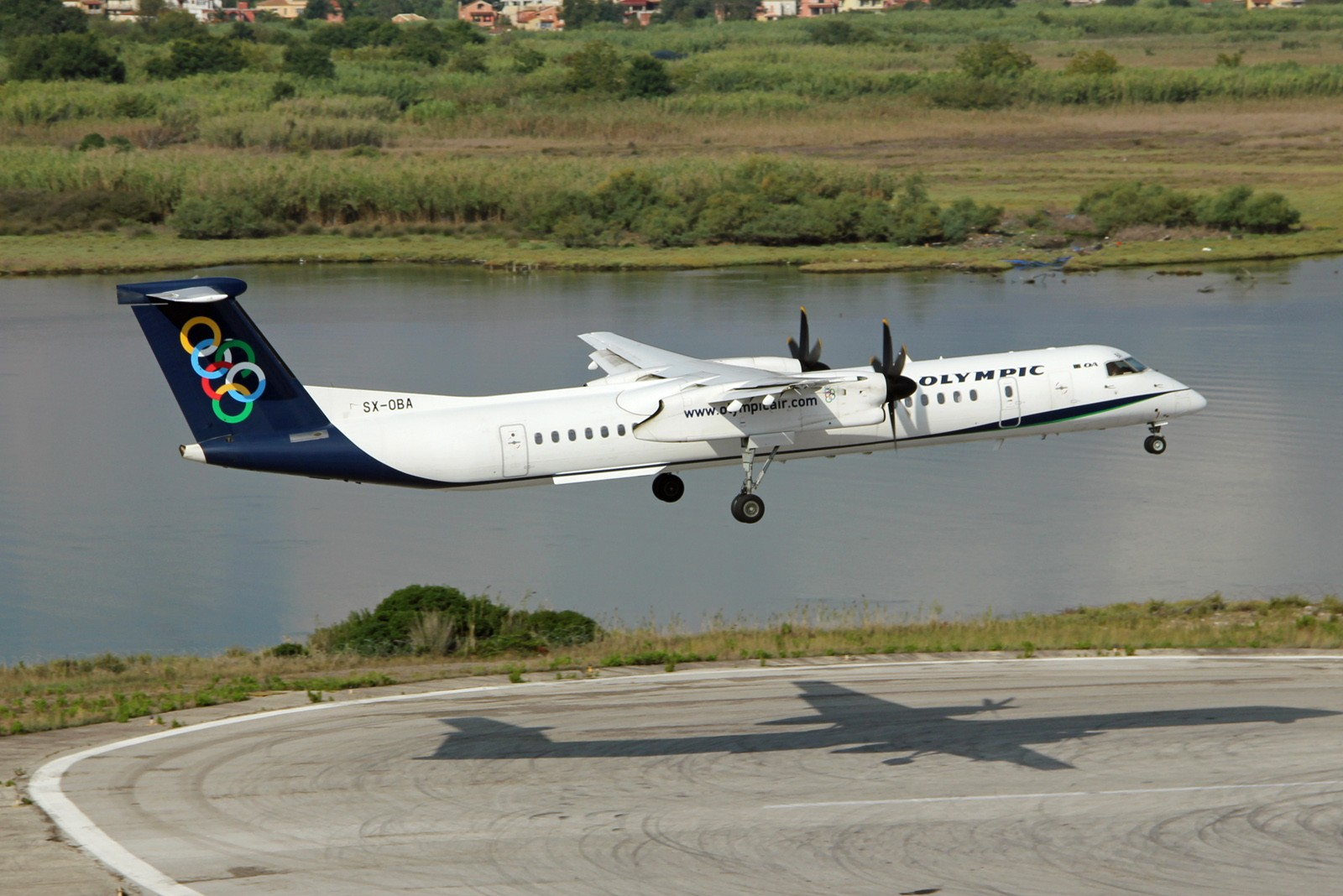
Olympic Air Bombardier Dash 8-Q400

- Aegean Airlines
- Air Mediterranean
- Bluebird Airways
- Olympic Air
- Sky Express

==== Greenland ====
- Air Greenland

==== Guernsey ====
- Air Alderney

==== Hungary ====
- Smartwings Hungary
- Wizz Air

==== Iceland ====
- Air Atlanta Icelandic
- Icelandair

==== Ireland, Republic of ====
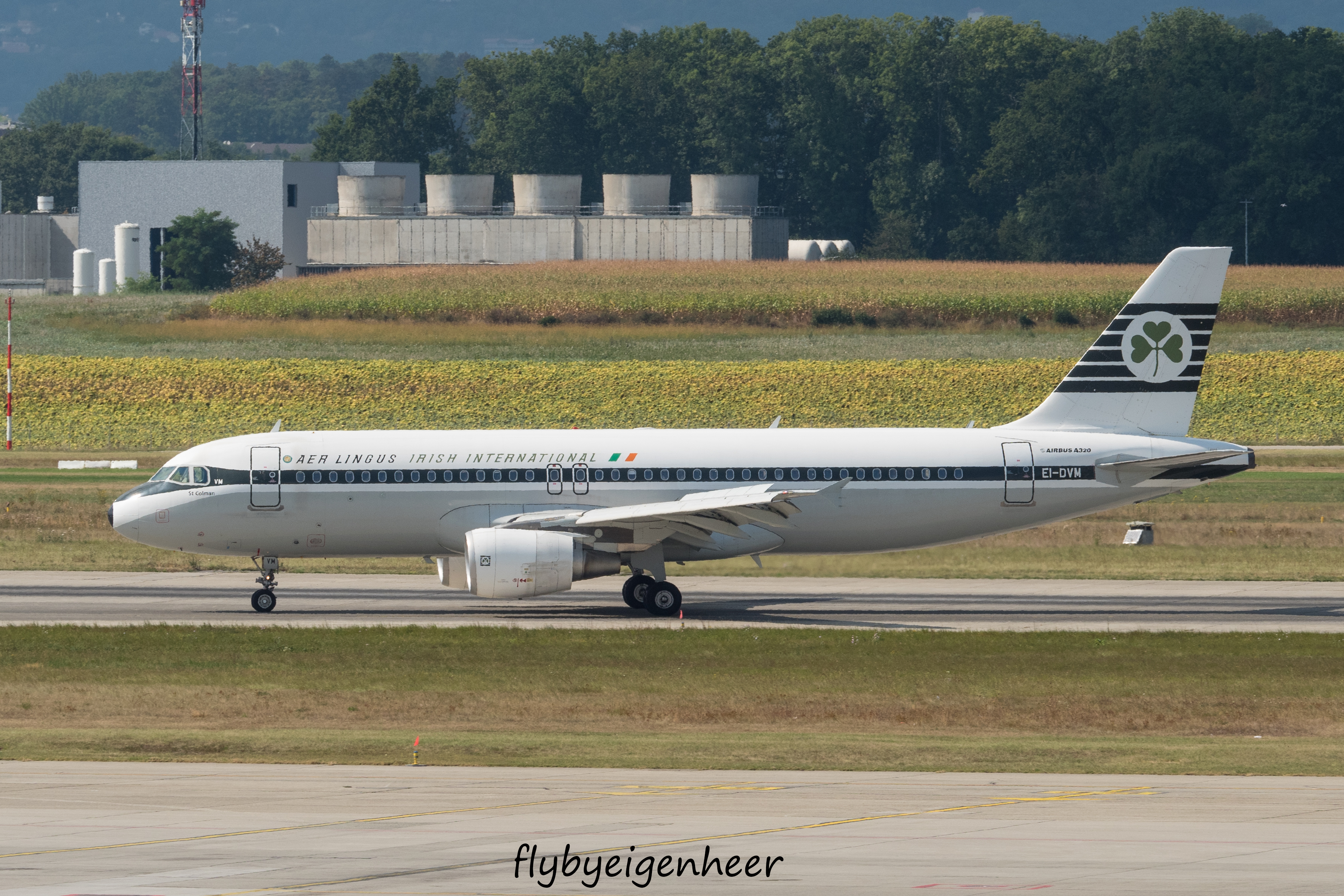
Aer Lingus Airbus A320-200

- Aer Lingus
- ASL Airlines Ireland
- CityJet
- Ryanair
- Stobart Air

==== Italy ====
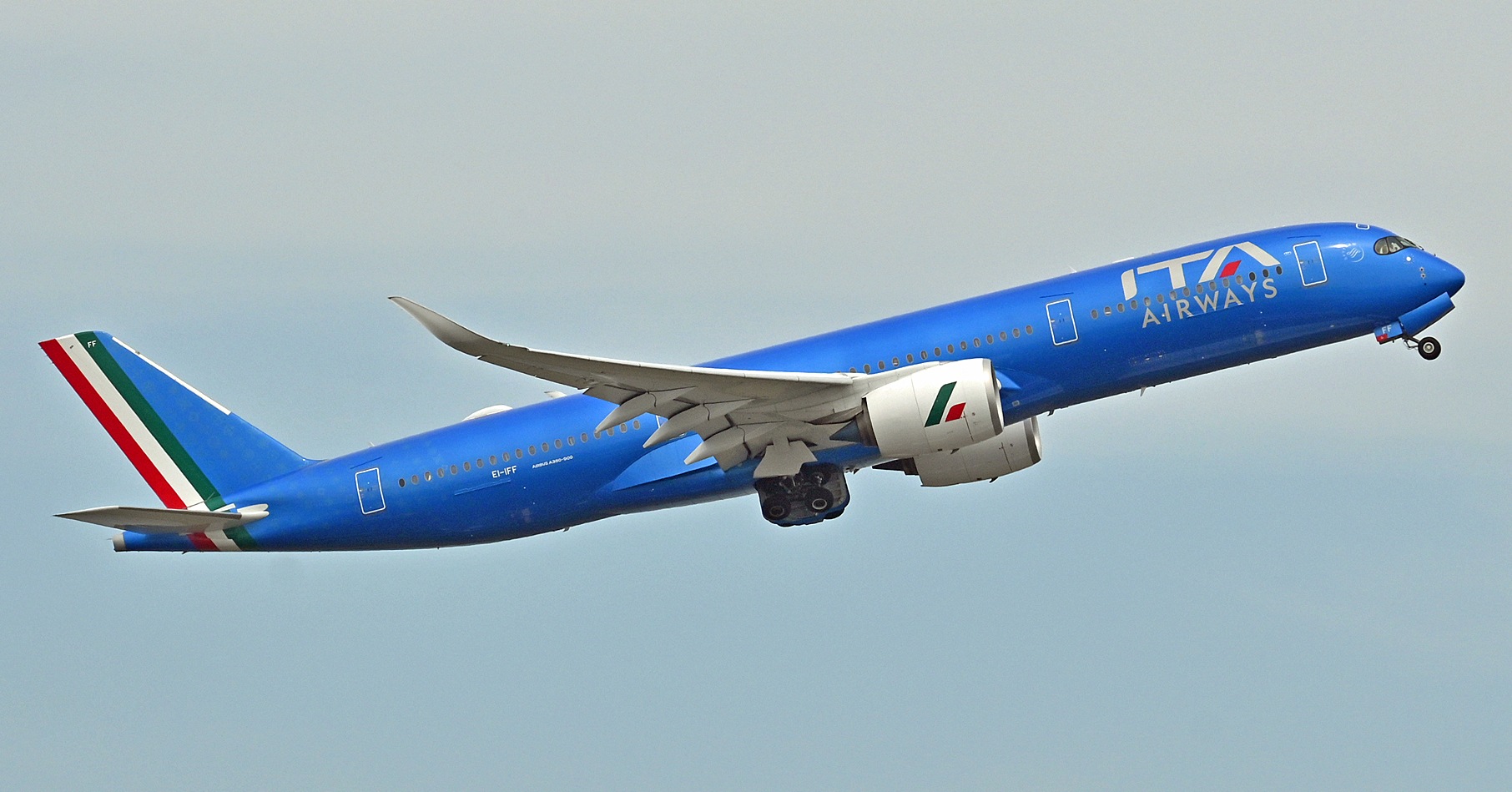
ITA Airways Airbus A350-900

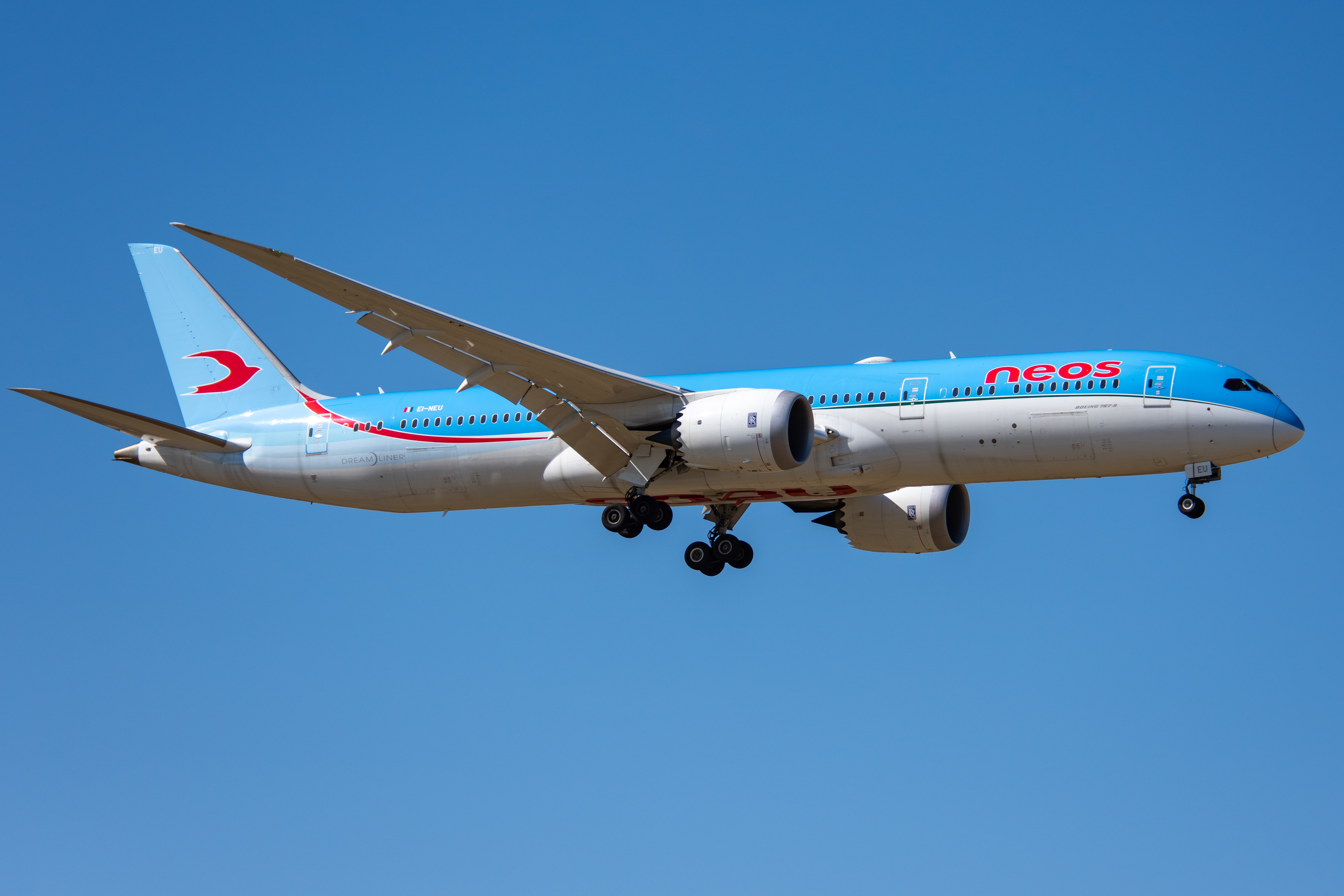
Neos Boeing 787-9 Dreamliner

- Aeroitalia
- Air Dolomiti
- Alidaunia
- ITA Airways
- Neos
- Sky Alps

==== Kosovo ====
- Kosova Airlines

==== Latvia ====
- airBaltic
- SmartLynx Airlines

==== Luxembourg ====
- Global Jet Luxembourg
- Luxair
- Luxaviation

==== Malta ====
- Freebird Airlines Europe
- KM Malta Airlines
- Medavia
- Malta Air

==== Moldova ====
- Air Moldova

==== Monaco ====
- Heli Air Monaco

==== Montenegro ====
- Air Montenegro

==== Netherlands ====
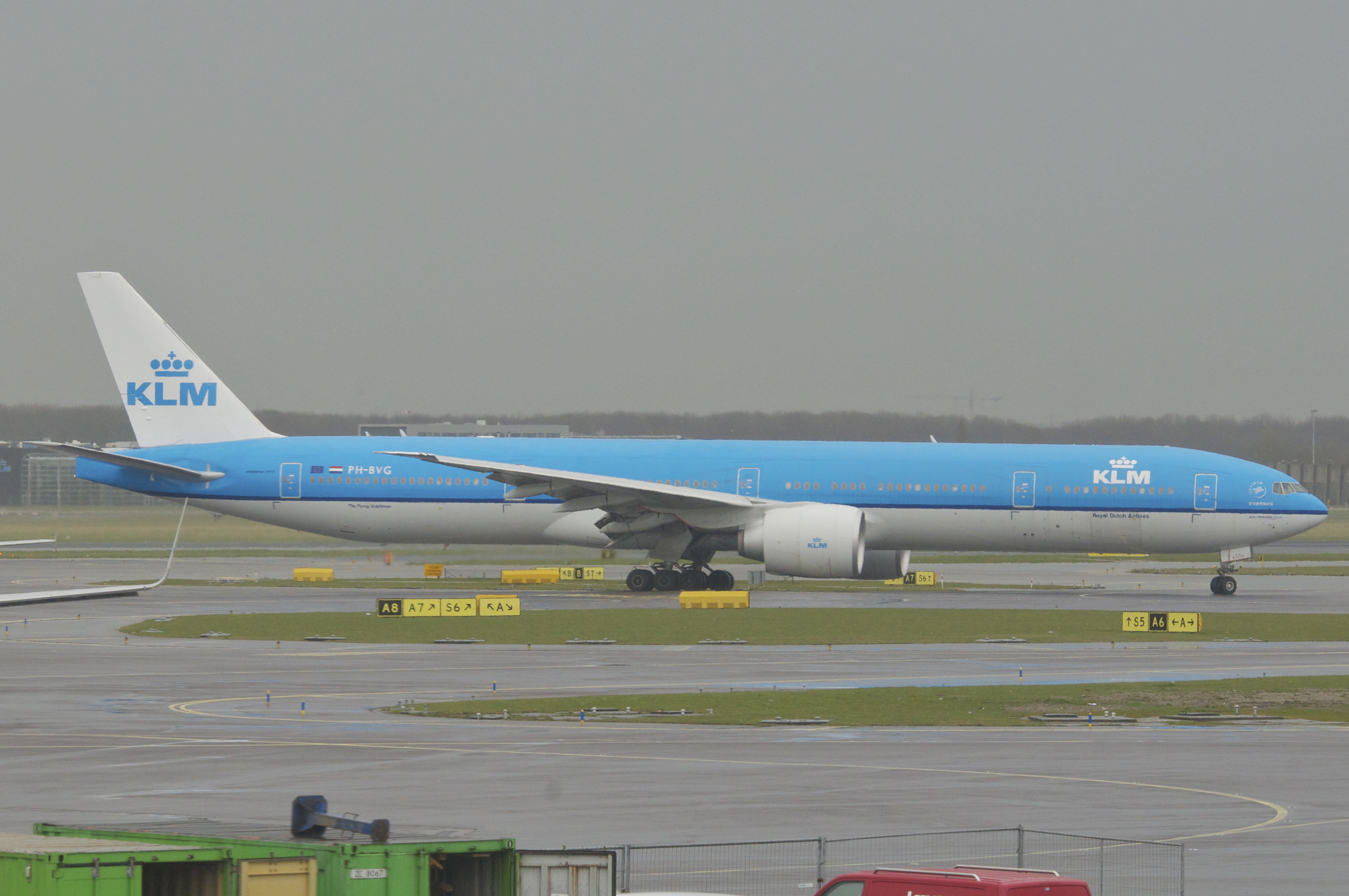
KLM Boeing 777-300ER

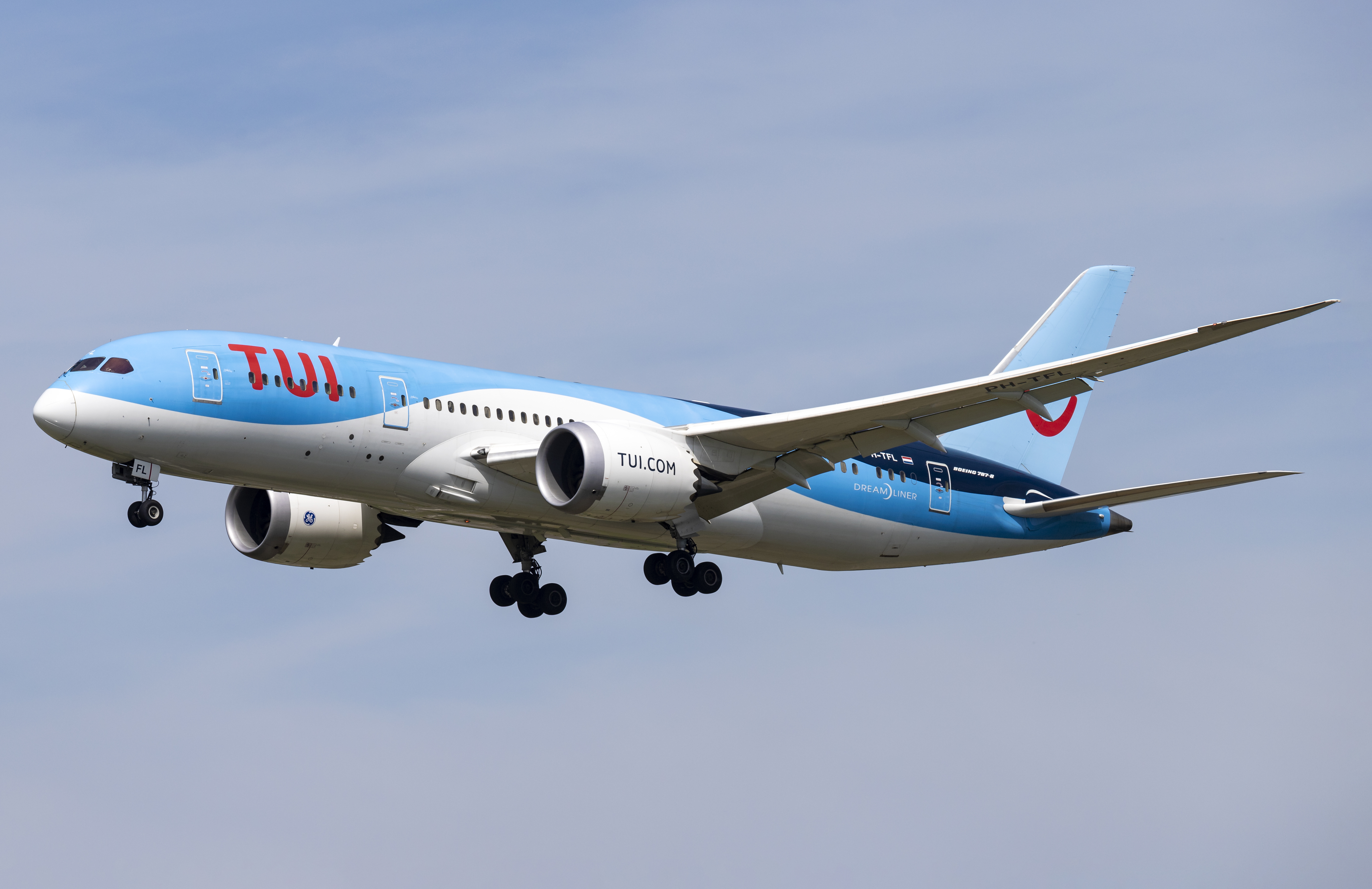
TUI fly Netherlands Boeing 787-8 Dreamliner

- Corendon Dutch Airlines
- KLM
  - KLM Cityhopper
- Transavia
- TUI fly Netherlands
- KLM Exel

==== North Macedonia ====
- Star Airlines

==== Norway ====
- Fonnafly
- Flyr
- Norse Atlantic Airways
- Norwegian Air Norway
- Norwegian Air Shuttle
- Scandinavian Airlines
- Sundt Air
- Widerøe

==== Poland ====
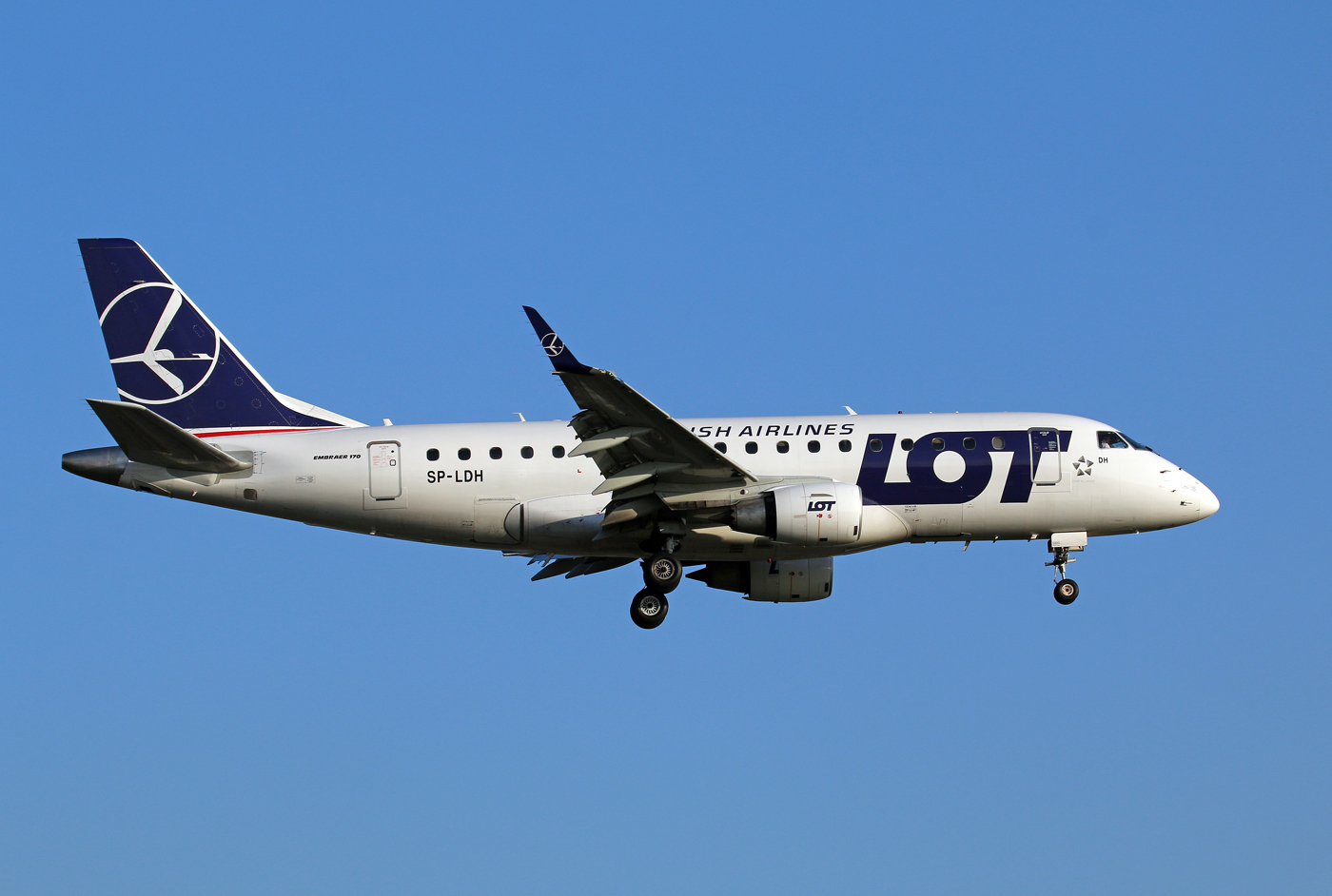
A LOT Polish Airlines Embraer 170 in LOT's 2010s livery

- Buzz
- Enter Air
- FlyJet
- IBEX
- LOT Charters
- LOT Polish Airlines
- SkyTaxi
- Smartwings Poland
- Sprint Air (formerly Air Polonia Cargo, Sky Express, Direct Fly)

==== Portugal ====
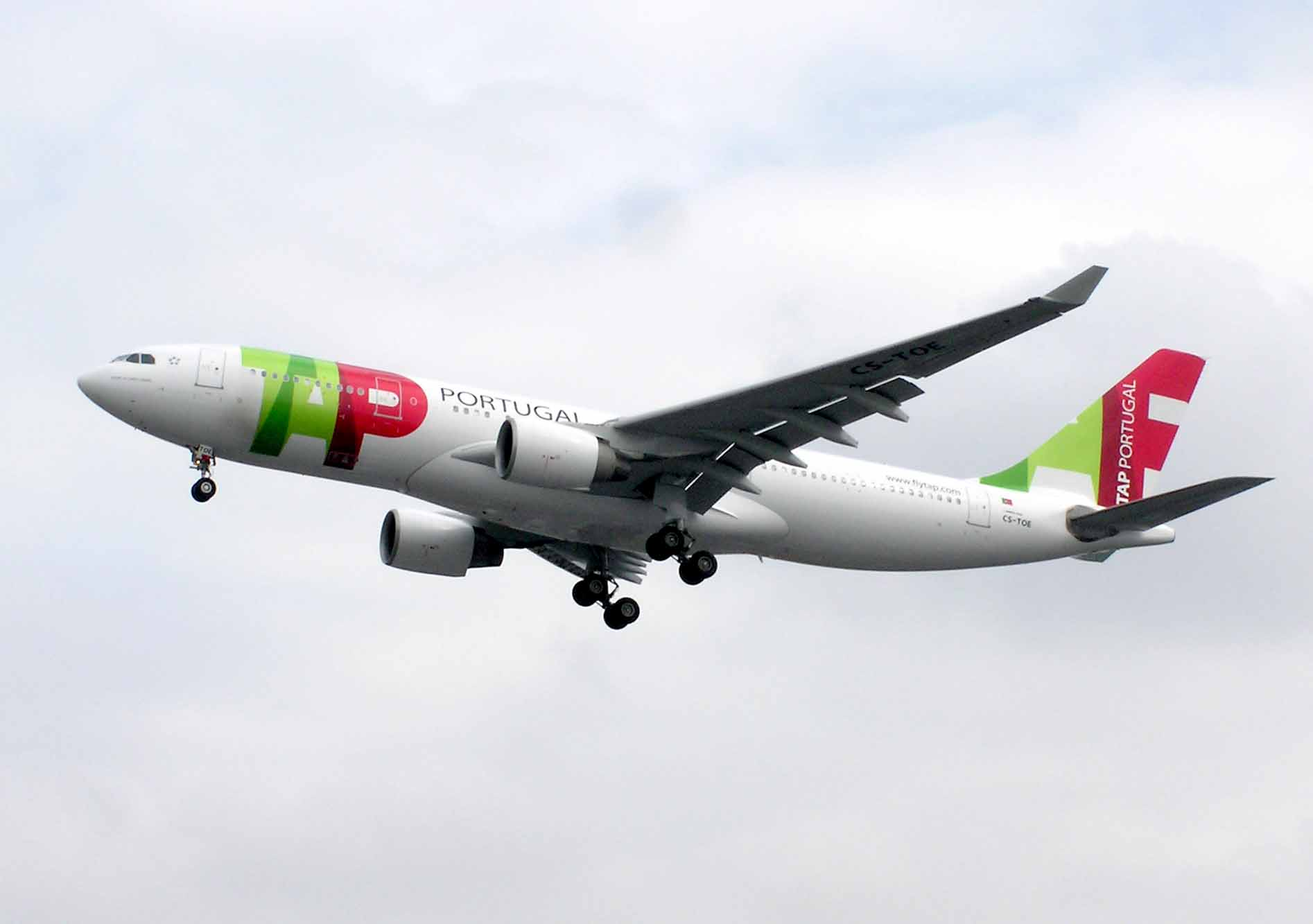
TAP Portugal Airbus A330-200

- Orbest
- Portugália
- SATA Air Acores
- SATA International
- TAP Portugal
- White

Air Portugal

==== Romania ====
- Blue Air
- Carpatair
- Jet Tran Air
- TAROM

==== Russia ====
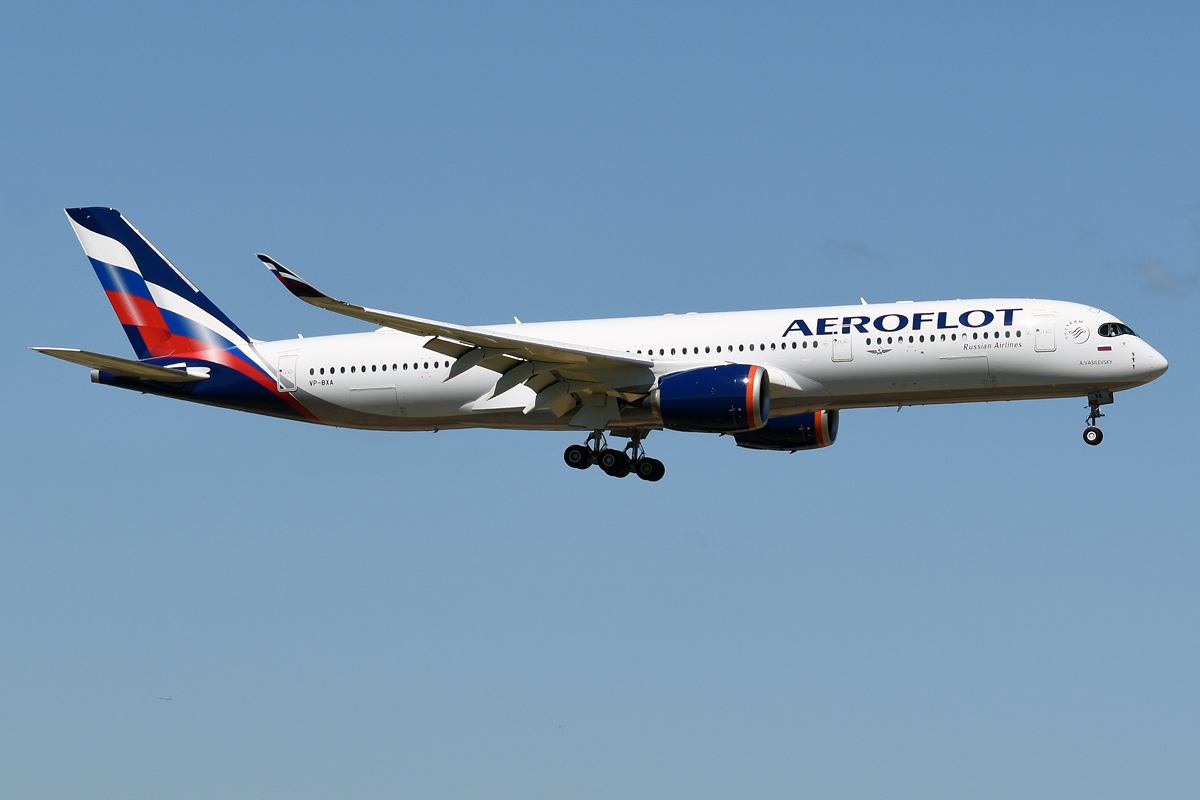
Aeroflot Airbus A350-900

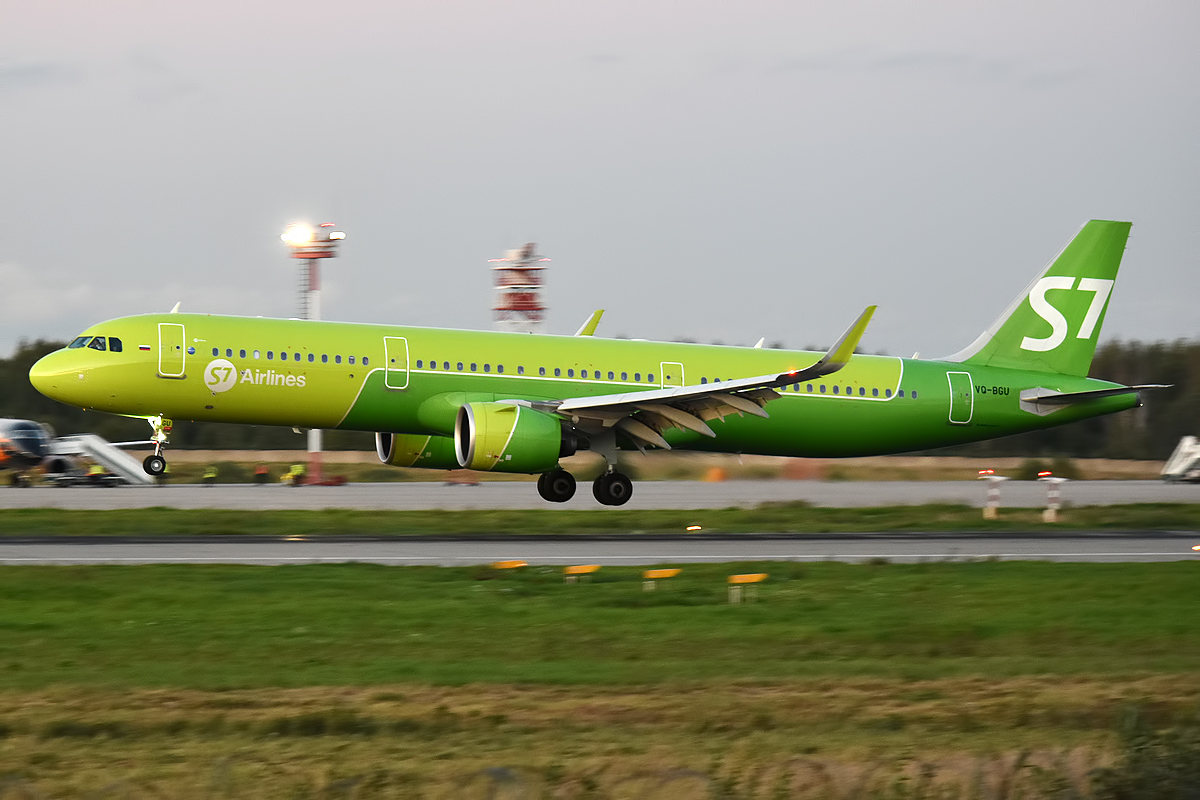
S7 Airlines Airbus A321neo

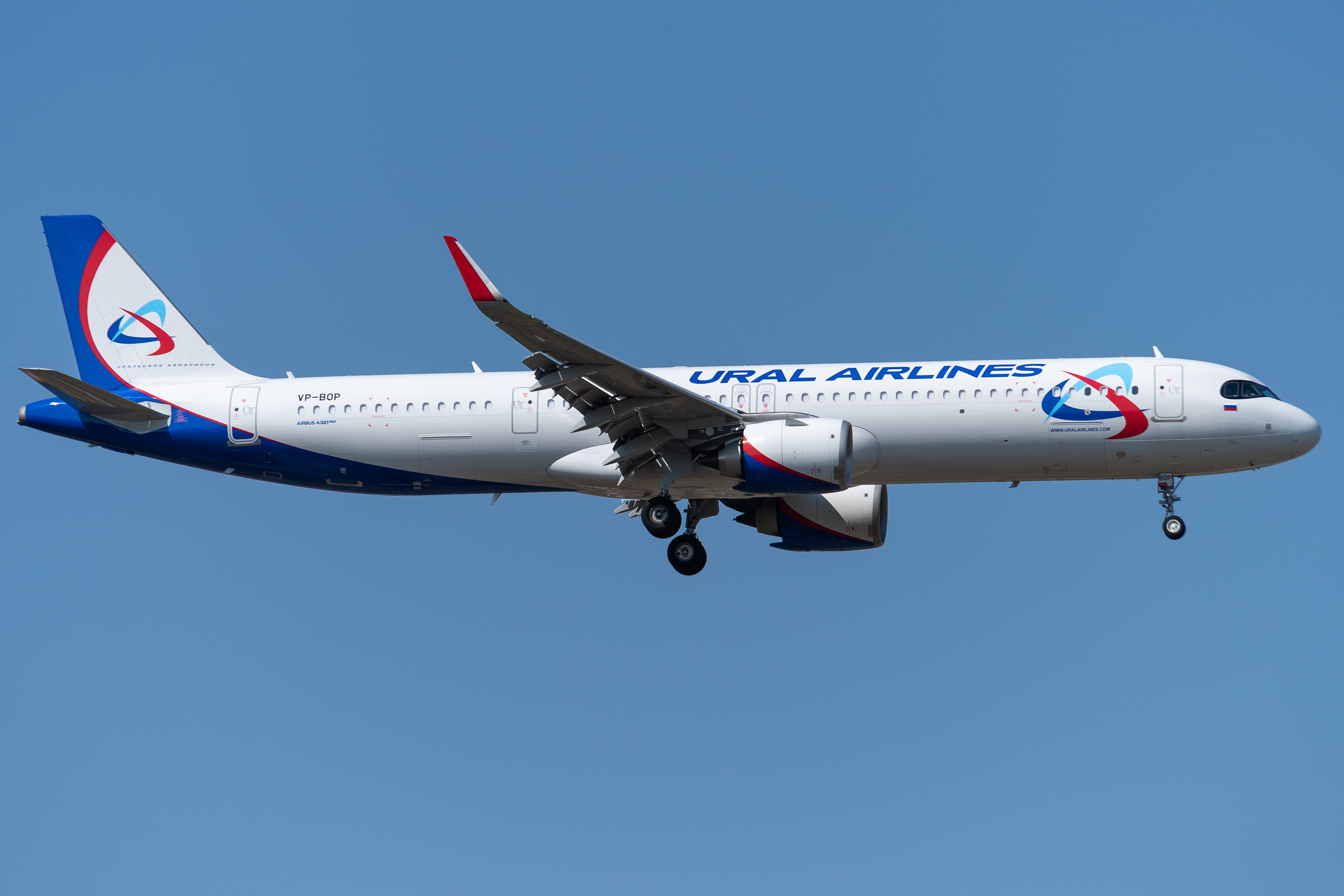
Ural Airlines Airbus A321neo

- 2nd Arkhangelsk Aviation Enterprise
- AeroBratsk
- Aeroflot
- Alrosa-Avia
- Angara Airlines
- Avcom
- Aviastar-TU
- Chukotavia
- Gazpromavia
- Izhavia
- Kazan Air Enterprise
- Komiaviatrans
- NordStar
- Petropavlovsk-Kamchatsky Air Enterprise
- Red Wings Airlines
- Rossiya
- S7 Airlines
- Smartavia
- Ural Airlines
- UTair Aviation
- Volga-Dnepr
- Vologda Aviation Enterprise
- Vostok Aviation Company
- Yakutia Airlines
- Yamal Airlines

==== Serbia ====
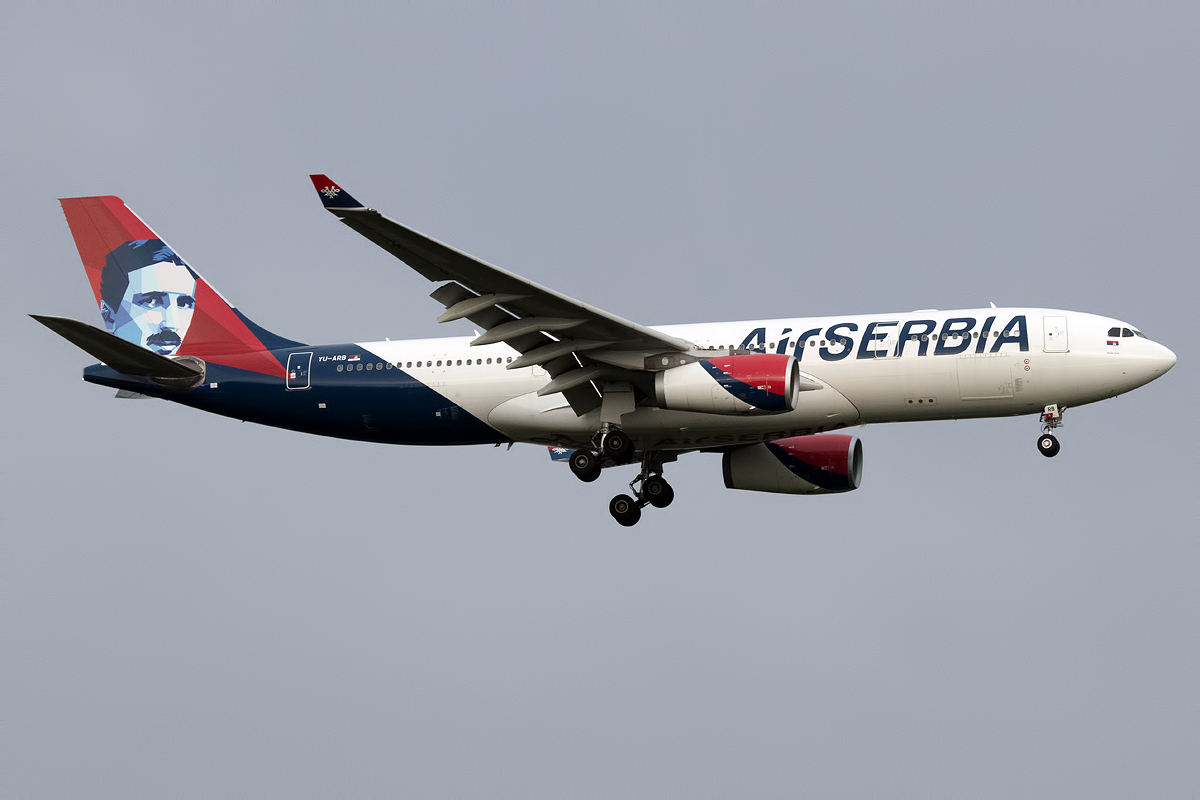
Air Serbia Airbus A330-200

- Air Serbia
- Airpink

==== Slovakia ====
- Aero Slovakia
- AirExplore
- SAM Air
- SmartWings Slovakia

==== Slovenia ====
- Solinair

==== Spain ====
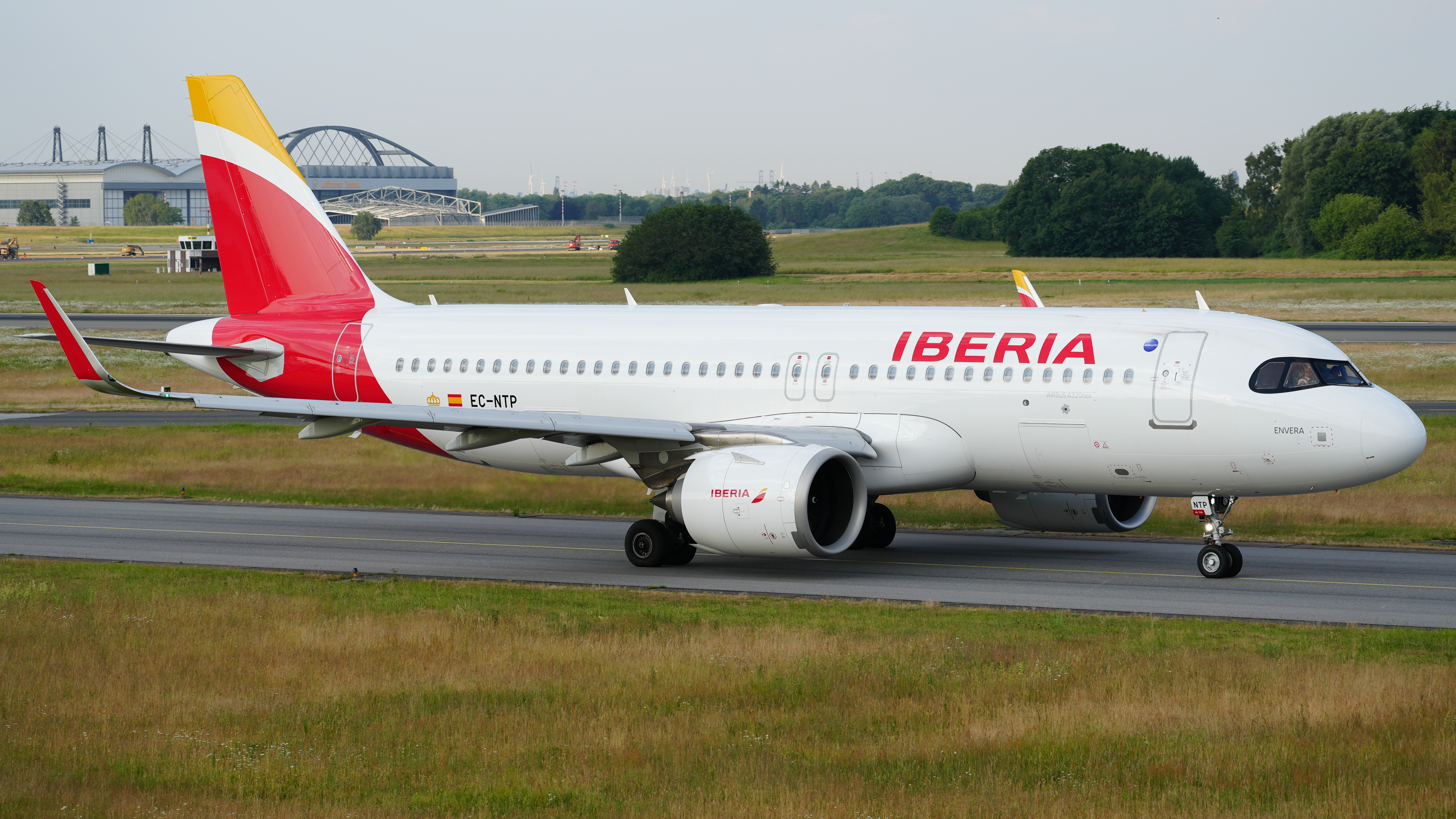
Iberia Airbus A320neo

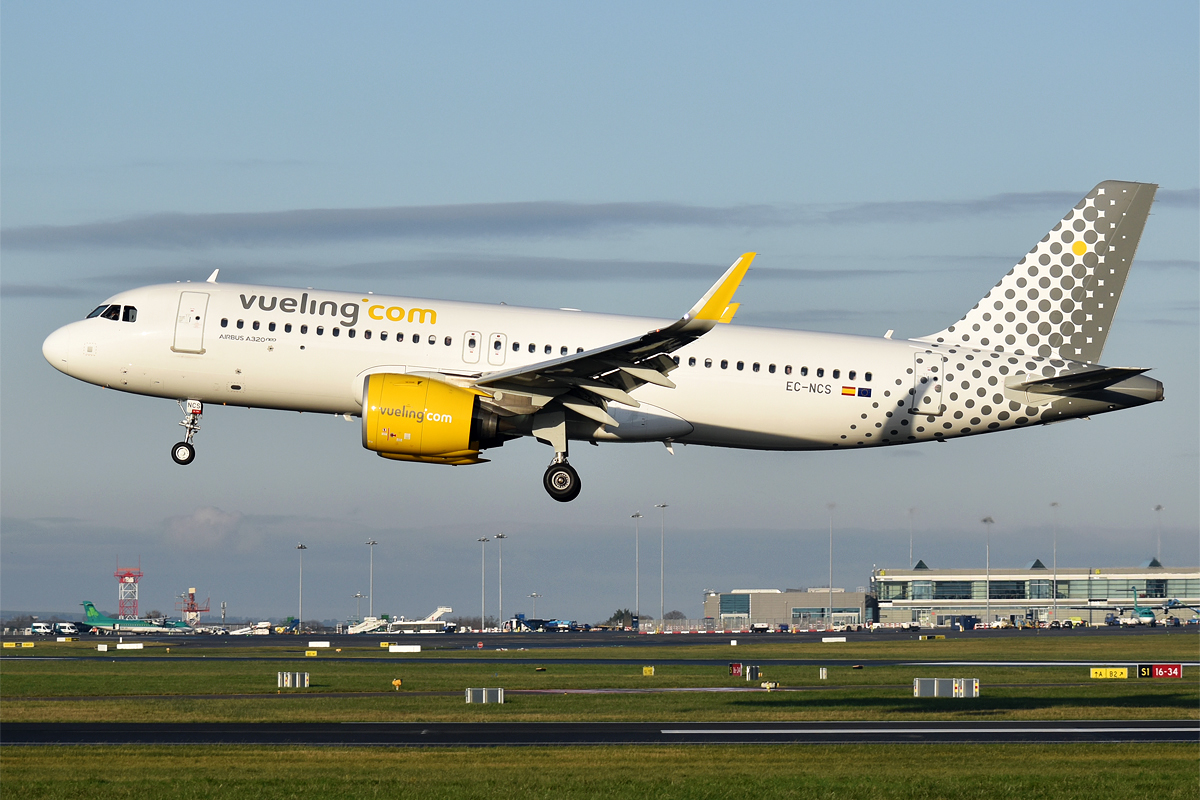
Vueling Airbus A320neo

- Air Este
- Air Europa
- Air Europa Express
- Air Granada
- Air Horizont
- Air Nostrum
- Air Pack Express
- Alaire
- Audeli Air
- Binter Canarias
- BKS Air
- CanaryFly
- Cygnus Air
- Evelop Airlines
- Euro Continental Air
- Fly LPI
- FlyAnt
- Iberia
- Iberia Express
- Iberojet
- Ibertrans Aérea
- Naysa Aerotaxis
- OrionAir
- Serair
- Swiftair
- Volotea
- Vueling
- Vuelos Mediterraneo
- Wamos Air
- Zorex Air Transport

==== Sweden ====
- Braathens Airways (BRA)
- Aerosynchro Aviation
- Kullaflyg
- Norwegian Air Sweden
- Novair
- Snålskjuten
- Stockholmsplanet
- Sundsvallsflyg
- TUIfly Nordic (previously Britannia Nordic)
- Scandinavian Airlines (SAS)
- Sparrow Aviation (Bankrupt)

==== Switzerland ====
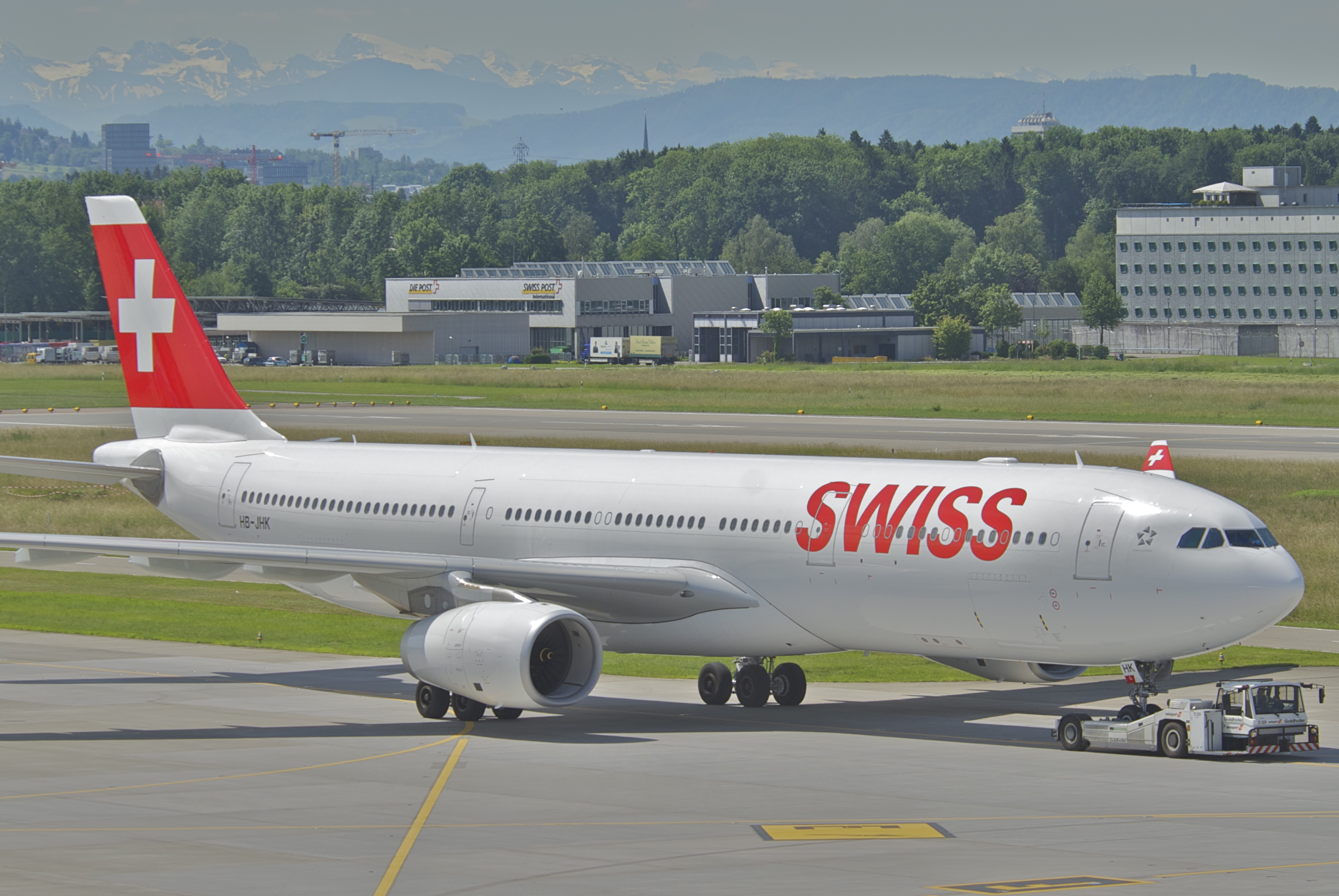
Swiss International Air Lines Airbus A330-300

- Air Glaciers
- Air Prishtina
- Club Airways International
- Connect Air
- easyJet Switzerland
- Edelweiss Air
- Helvetic Airways
- Jet Aviation
- Ju-Air
- Swiss International Air Lines

==== Ukraine ====
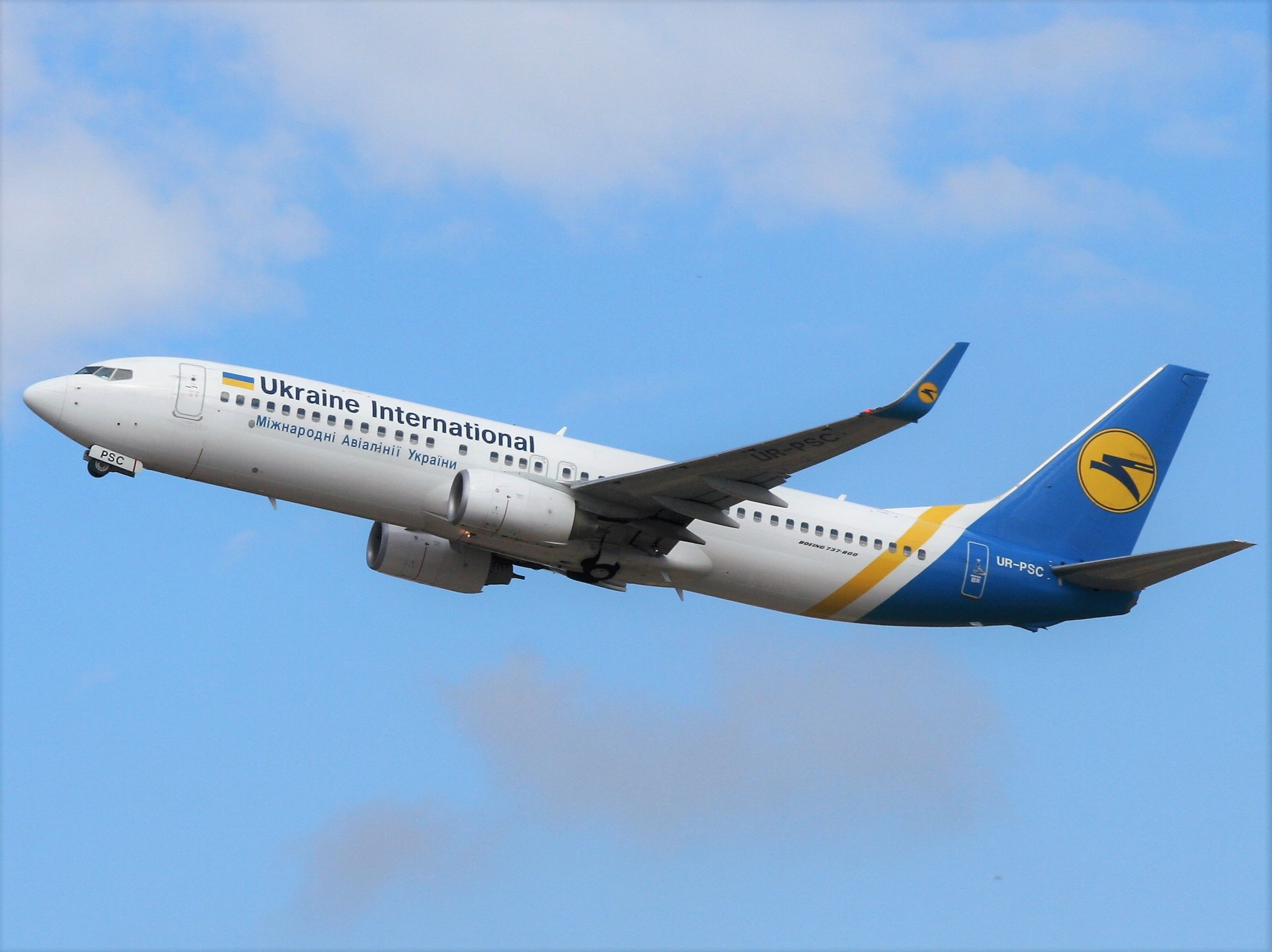
Ukraine International Airlines Boeing 737-800

- Air Kharkov
- Air Urga
- Constanta Airline
- Motor Sich Airlines
- Podilia-Avia
- Ukraine International Airlines
- Yuzhmashavia

==== United Kingdom ====
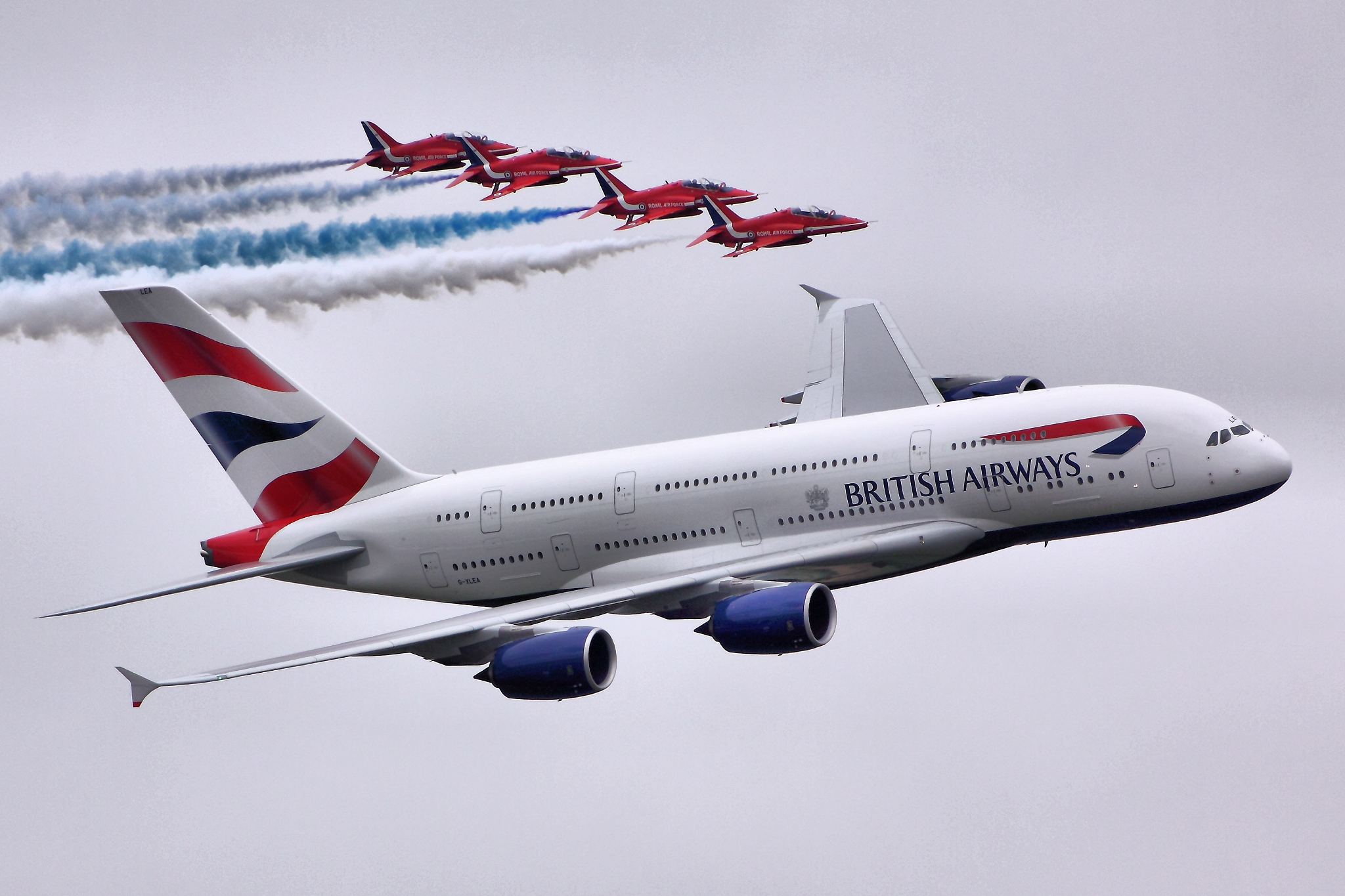
British Airways' first Airbus A380, accompanied by the Red Arrows at 2013 Royal International Air Tattoo

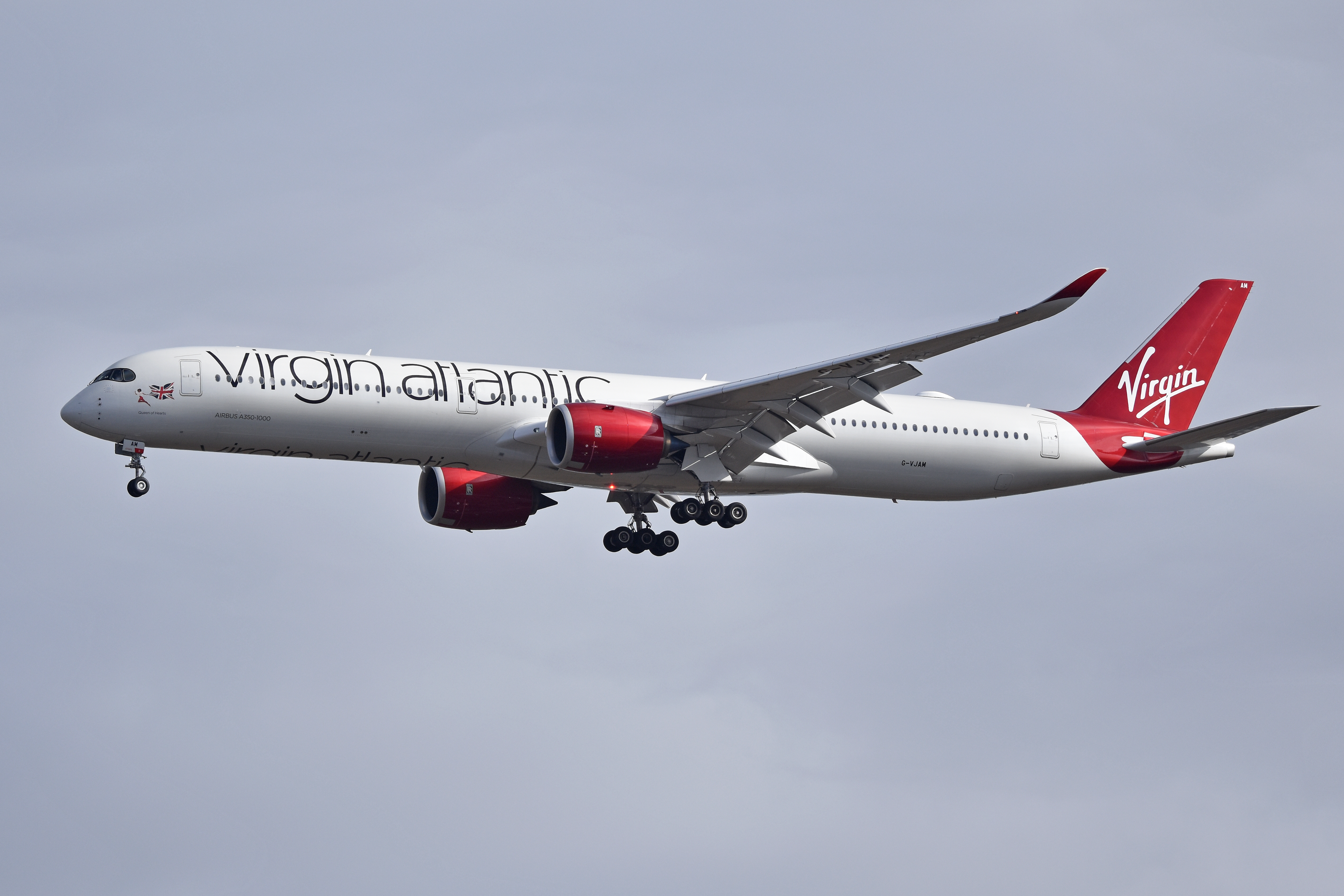
Virgin Atlantic Airbus A350-1000

- Air Atlantique
- Aurigny
- Blue Islands
- British Airways
- Eastern Airways
- easyJet
- Isles of Scilly Skybus
- Jet2.com
- Loganair
- Lydd Air
- Titan Airways
- TUI Airways
- Virgin Atlantic
- Wizz Air UK
- McIntyre Airways

=== Middle East ===
Contents: Top - A B C D E F G H I J K L M N O P Q R S T U V W X Y Z

==== Bahrain ====
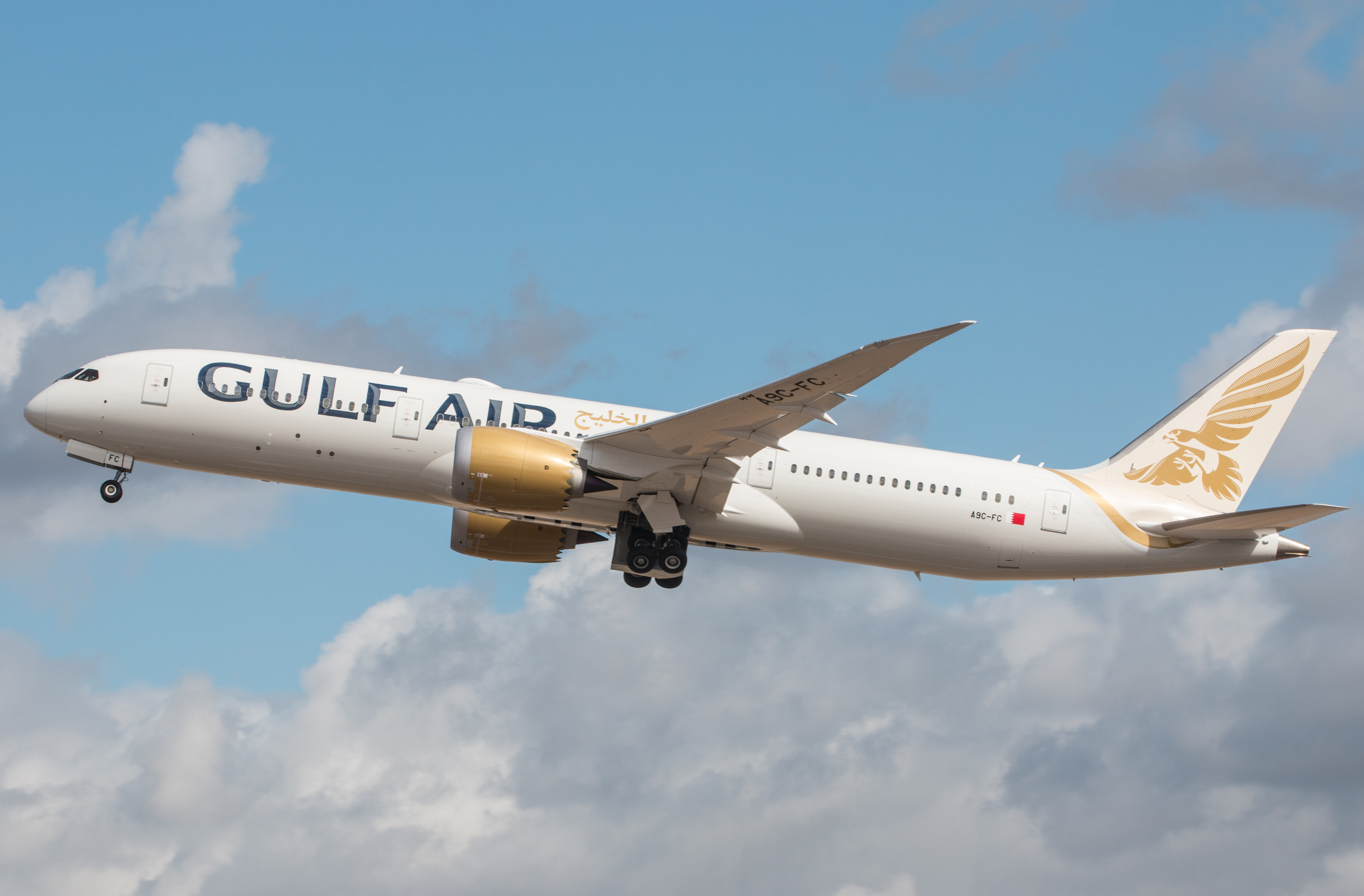
Gulf Air Boeing 787-9 Dreamliner

- Gulf Air

==== Iran ====
- Aria Tour
- Ata Airlines
- Atrak Airlines
- Caspian Airlines
- Iran Air
- Iran Aseman Airlines
- Iran Airtours
- Kish Air
- Mahan Air
- Meraj Airlines
- Pouya Air
- Qeshm Air
- Safat Airlines
- Saha Airlines
- Sahand Airlines
- Sepehran Airlines
- Simorgh Airlines
- Taban Airlines
- Tehran Air
- Varesh Airlines
- Zagros Airlines

==== Iraq ====
- FlyErbil
- Iraqi Airways

==== Israel ====
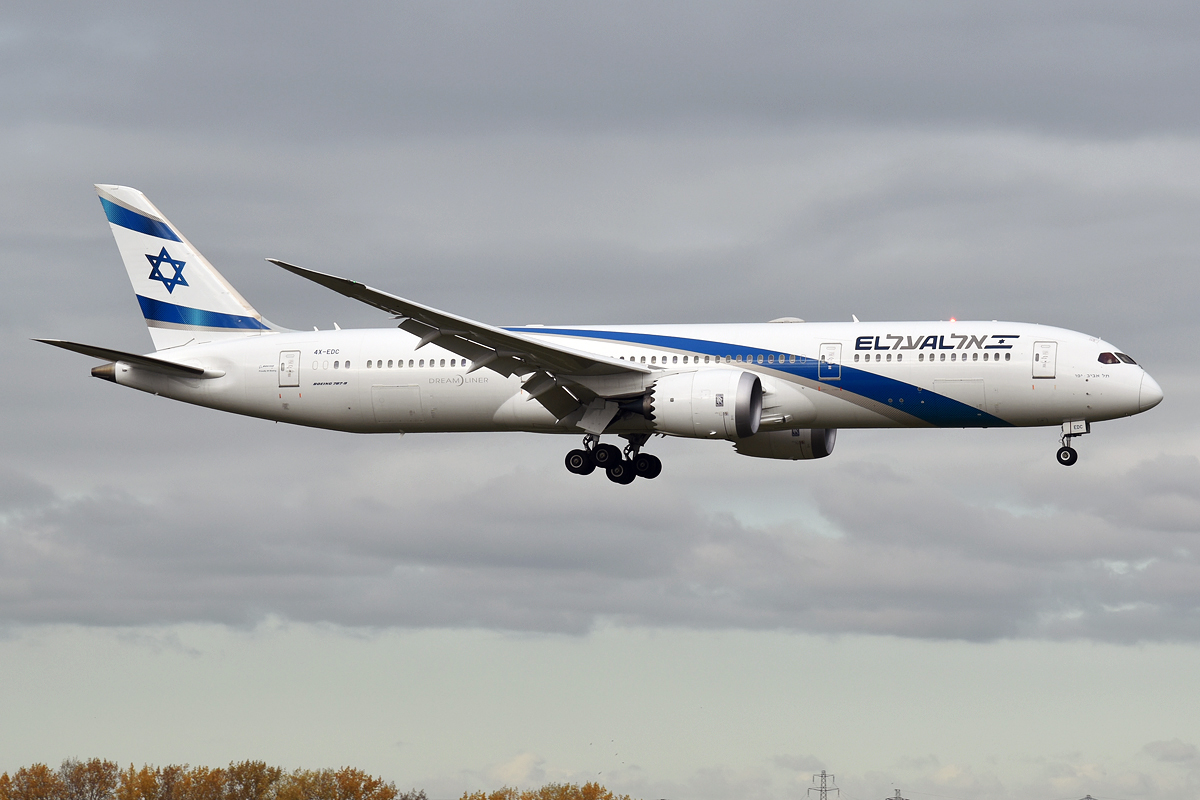
El Al Boeing 787-9 Dreamliner

- Arkia Airlines
- Chim-Nir Aviation
- El Al
- Israir
- Orange Aviation
- Sun D'Or

==== Jordan ====
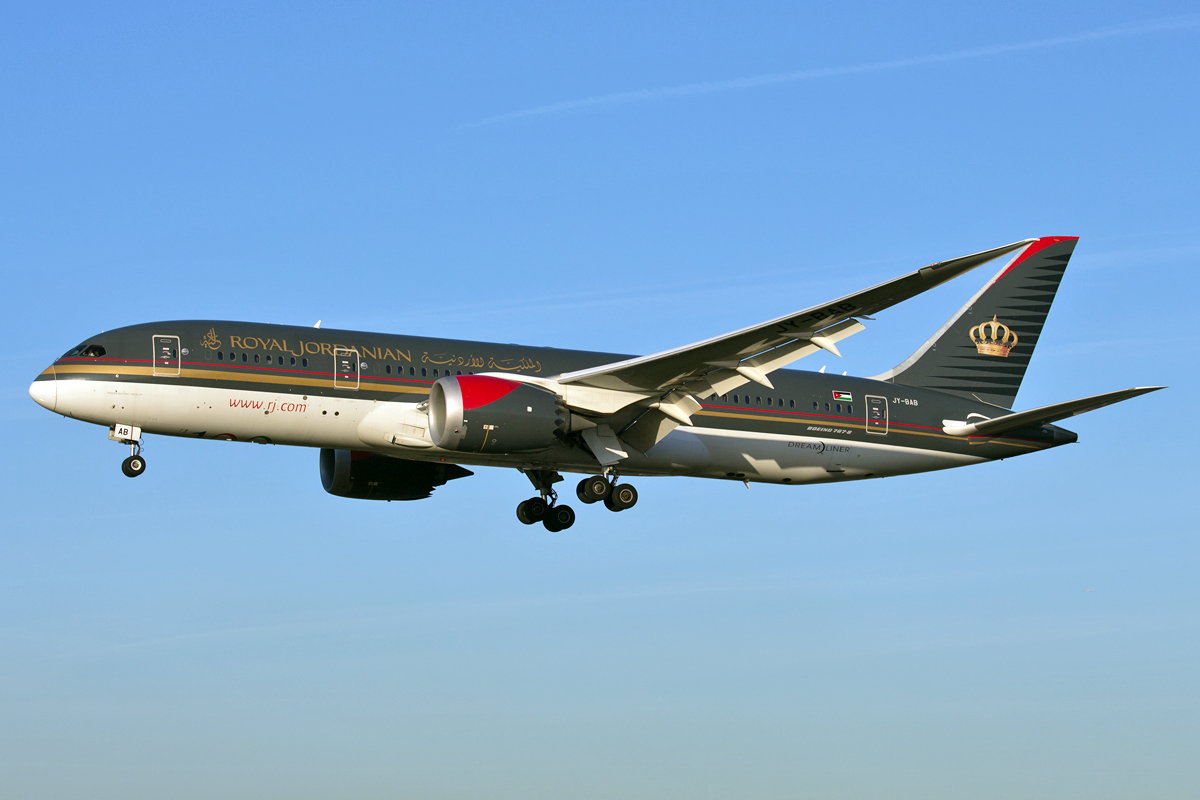
Royal Jordanian Boeing 787-8 Dreamliner

- Jordan Aviation
- Raya Jet
- Royal Jordanian

==== Kuwait ====
- Jazeera Airways
- Kuwait Airways

==== Lebanon ====
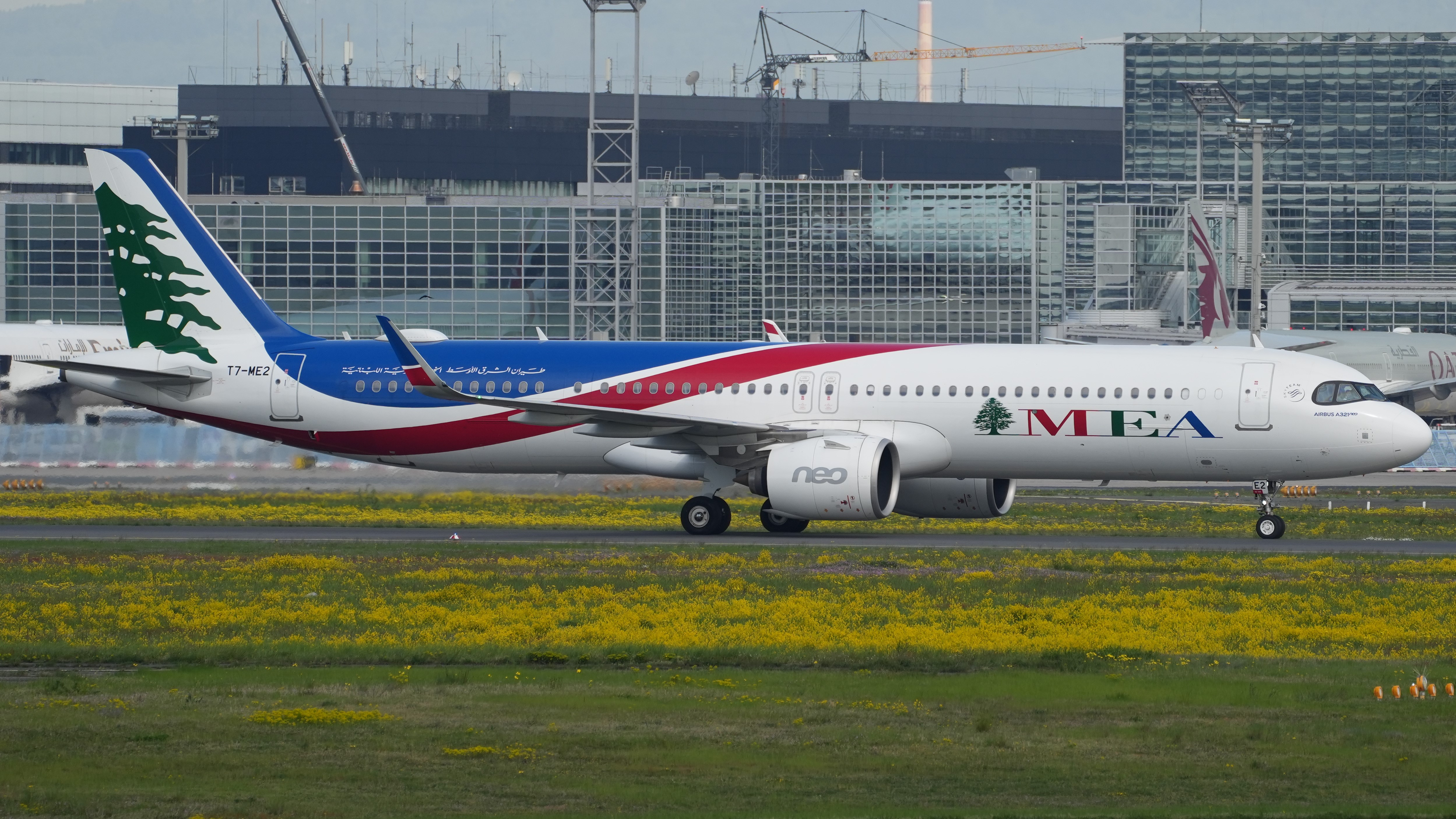
Middle East Airlines Airbus A321neo

- Lebanese Air Transport
- Middle East Airlines

==== Oman ====
- Oman Air
- SalamAir

==== Qatar ====
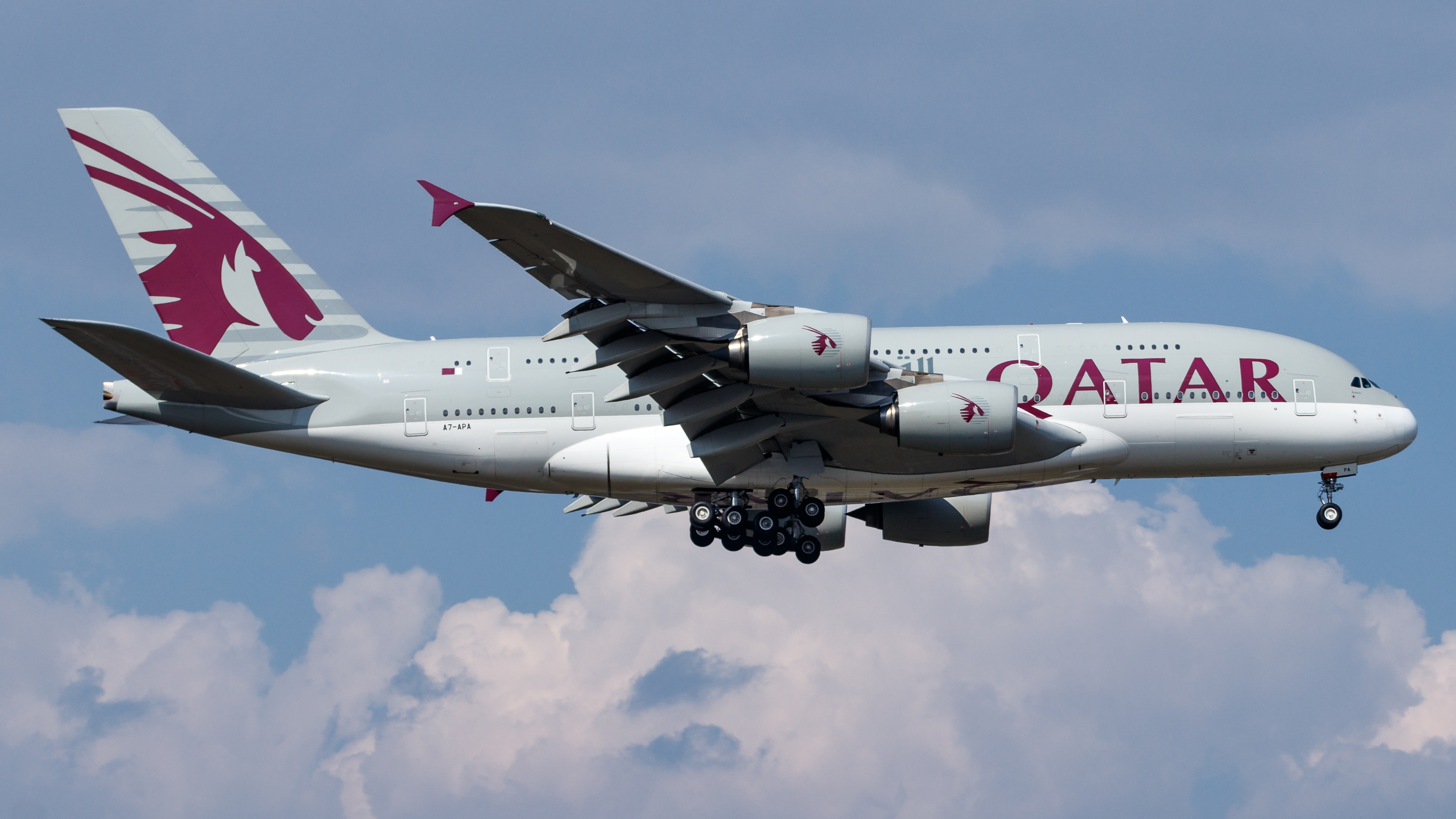
Qatar Airways Airbus A380-800

- Qatar Airways

==== Saudi Arabia ====
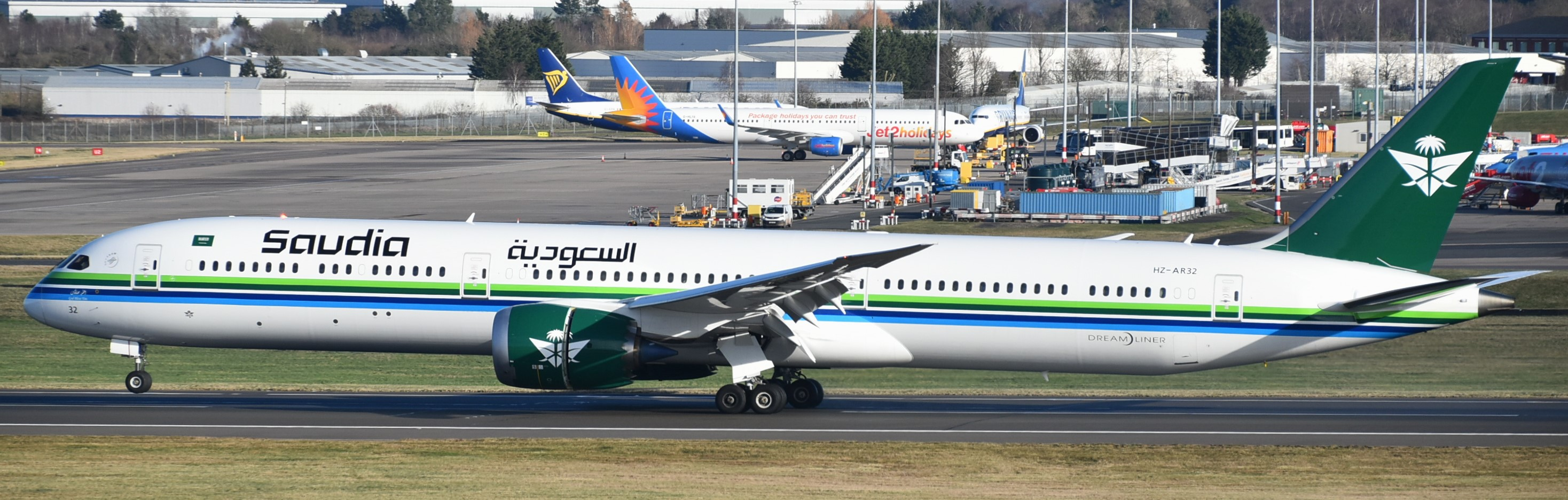
Saudia Boeing 787-10 Dreamliner

- Flyadeal
- Nesma Airlines
- Saudia
- SaudiGulf Airlines
- flynas

==== Syria ====
- Cham Wings Airlines
- FlyDamas
- Kinda Airlines
- Syrian Air

==== United Arab Emirates ====
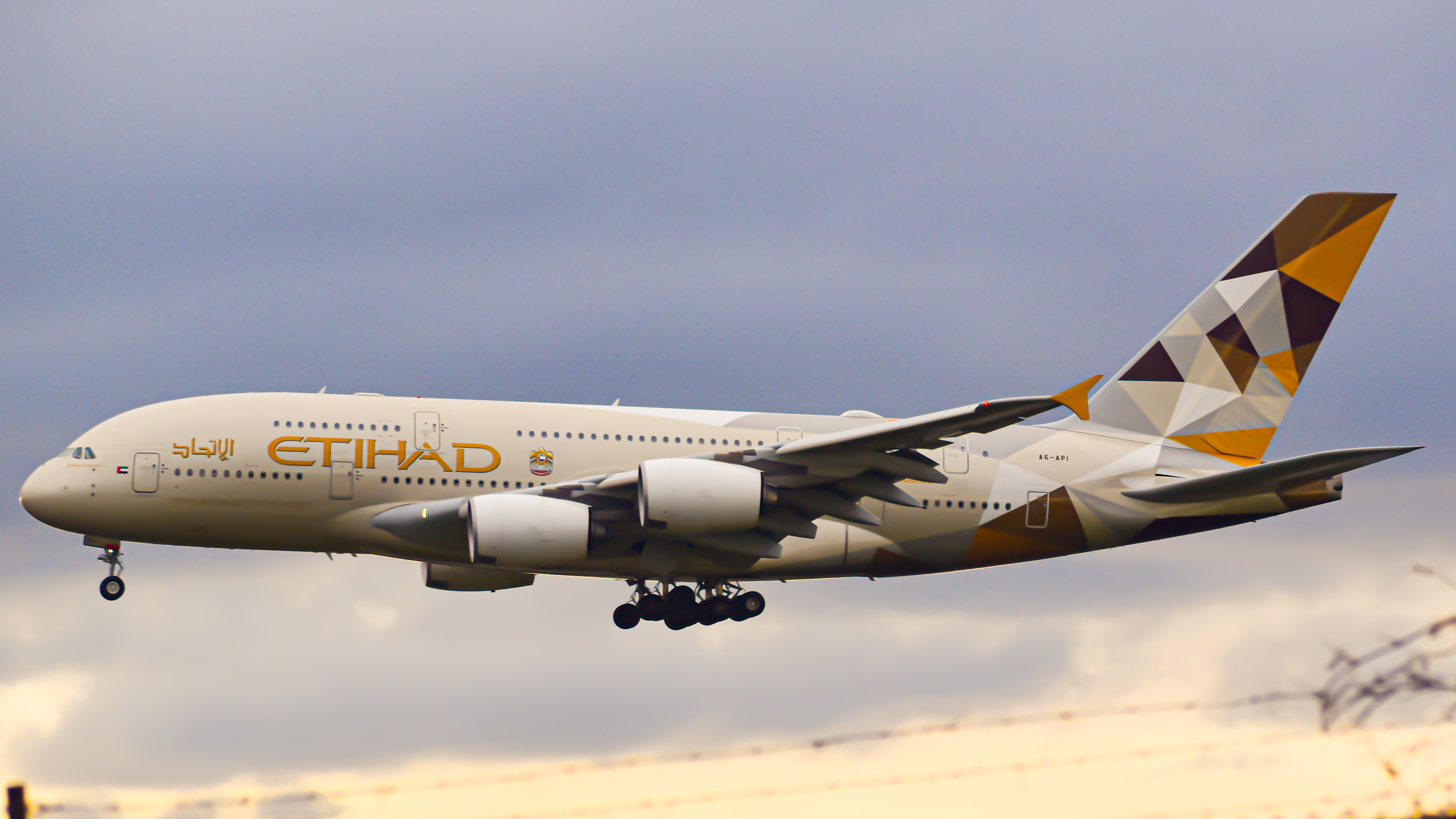
Etihad Airways Airbus A380

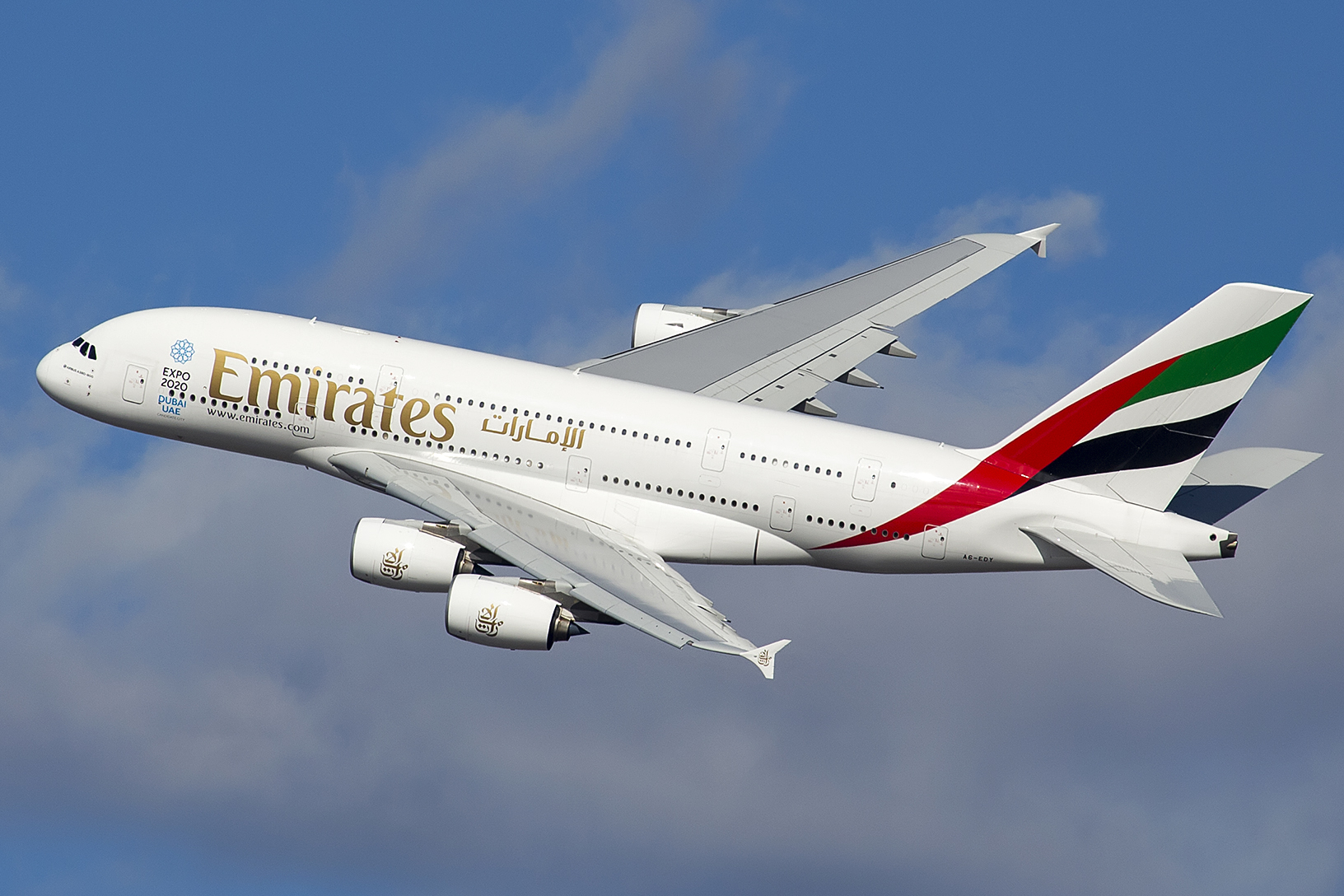
Emirates Airbus A380

- Abu Dhabi Aviation
- Aerovista Airlines
- Air Arabia
- Aria Air
- Emirates
- Etihad Airways
- flydubai
- Pluto Airlines
- Reem Air
- Royal Jet
- StarJet
- Wizz Air Abu Dhabi

==== Yemen ====
- Felix Airways
- Yemenia

=== North America ===
Contents: Top - A B C D E F G H I J K L M N O P Q R S T U V W X Y Z

==== Canada ====
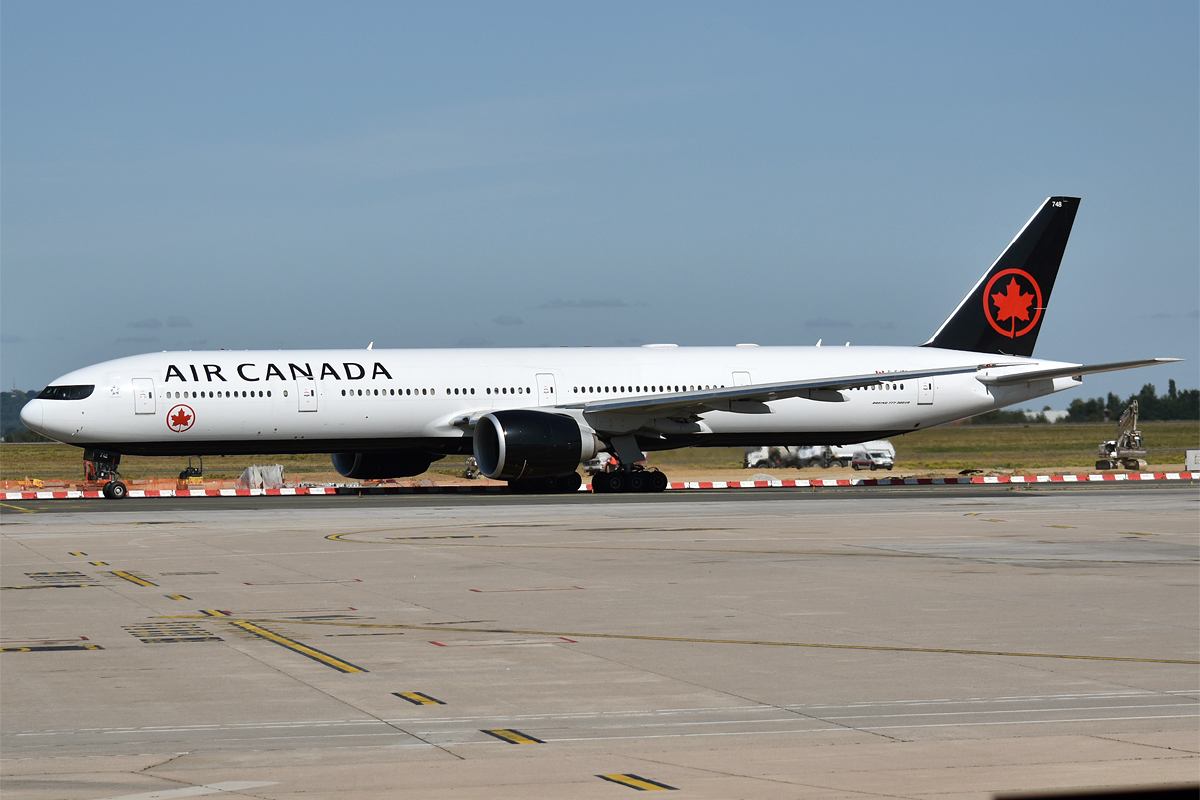
Air Canada Boeing 777-300ER

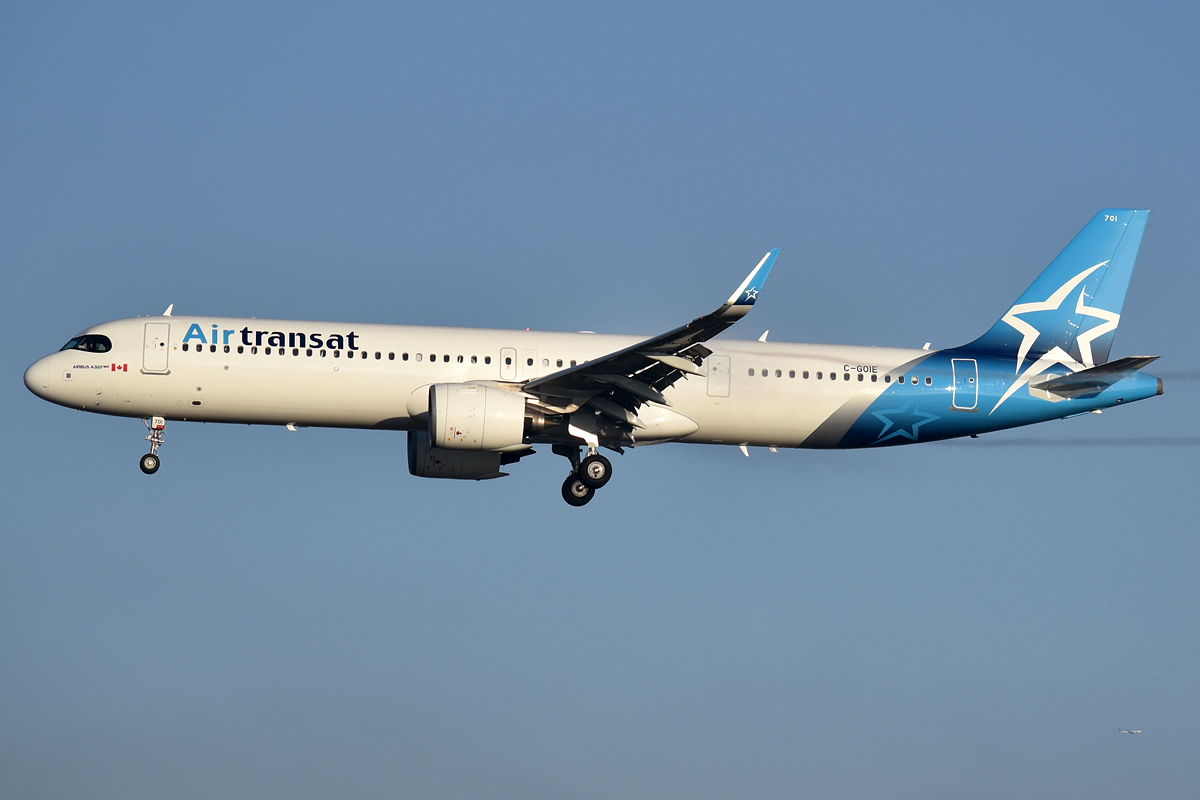
Air Transat Airbus A321neo

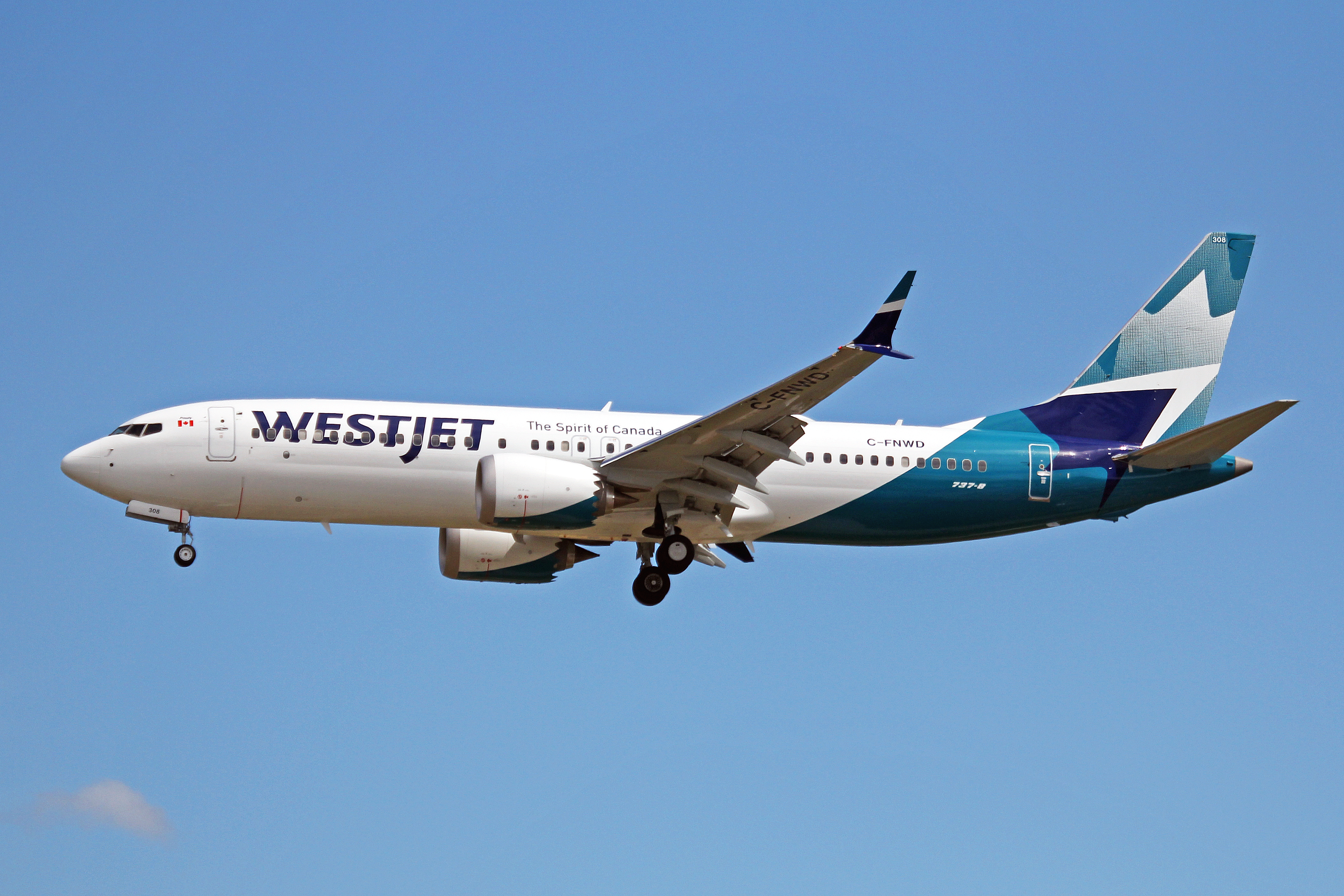
WestJet Boeing 737 MAX 8

- Air Canada
- Air Canada Express
- Air Canada Jazz
- Air Canada Jetz
- Air Canada Rouge
- Air Creebec
- Air Inuit
- Air Liaison
- Air North
- Air Nunavut
- Air Tindi
- Air Transat
- Aklak Air
- Alkan Air
- Bearskin Airlines
- Buffalo Airways
- Calm Air
- Canada Jetlines
- Canadian Metro Airlines
- Canadian North
- Central Mountain Air
- Canadian Helicopters
- Chorno Aviation
- Cloud Air
- Cougar Helicopters
- Exact Air
- Exploits Valley Air Services
- Flair Airlines
- FlyGTA Airlines
- Harbour Air
- HeliJet
- KF Cargo
- Keewatin Air
- Kenn Borek Air
- Kivalliq Air
- Lakeland Aviation
- Nolinor Aviation
- Northwestern Air
- Pacific Coastal Airlines
- PAL Airlines
- Perimeter Aviation
- Porter Airlines
- SkyLink Aviation
- Summit Air
- Sunwest Aviation
- Sunwing Airlines
- Thunder Airlines
- Tofino Air
- Transwest Air
- Vancouver Island Air
- Voyageur Airways
- Wasaya Airways
- WestJet
- White River Air

==== Greenland ====
- Air Greenland

==== Mexico ====
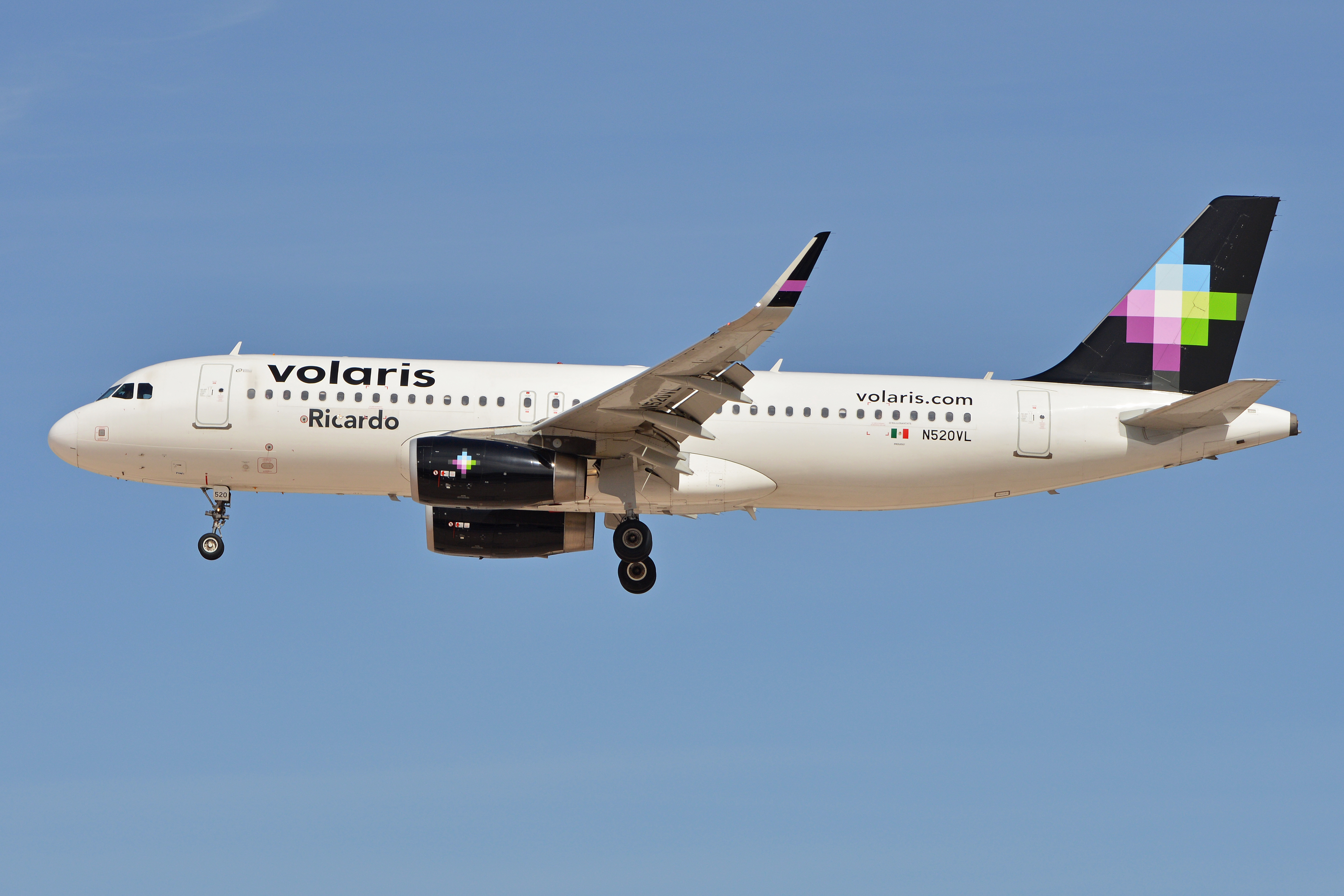
Volaris Airbus A320-232

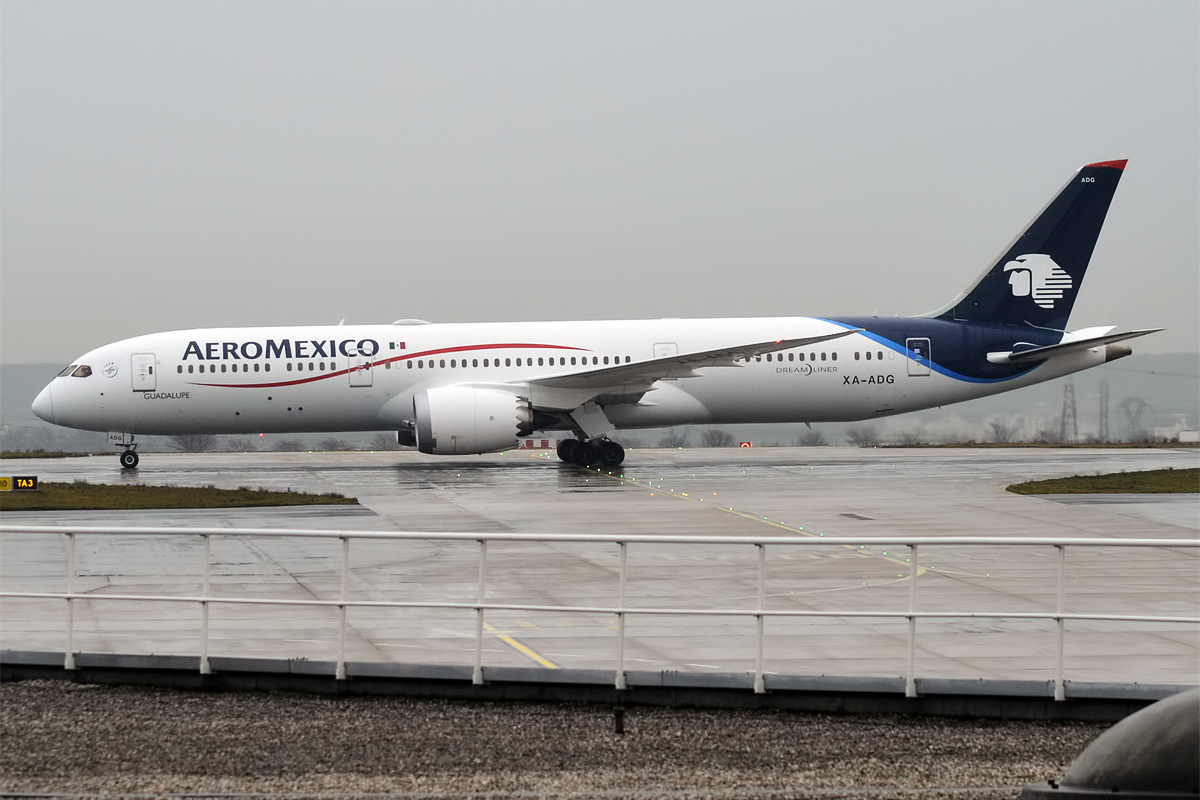
Aeroméxico Boeing 787-9 Dreamliner

- Aero California
- Aero Cuahonte
- Aerolitoral
- Aeromar
- Aeroméxico
- Aeroméxico Connect
- Calafia Airlines
- Global Air
- Interjet
- Mexicana
- Nova Air
- Republicair
- Servicios Aeronáuticos de Oriente (SARO)
- TAR Aerolíneas
- VivaAerobus
- Volaris

==== Saint-Pierre and Miquelon ====
- Air Saint-Pierre

==== United States ====
Contents: Top - A B C D E F G H I J K L M N O P Q R S T U V W X Y Z

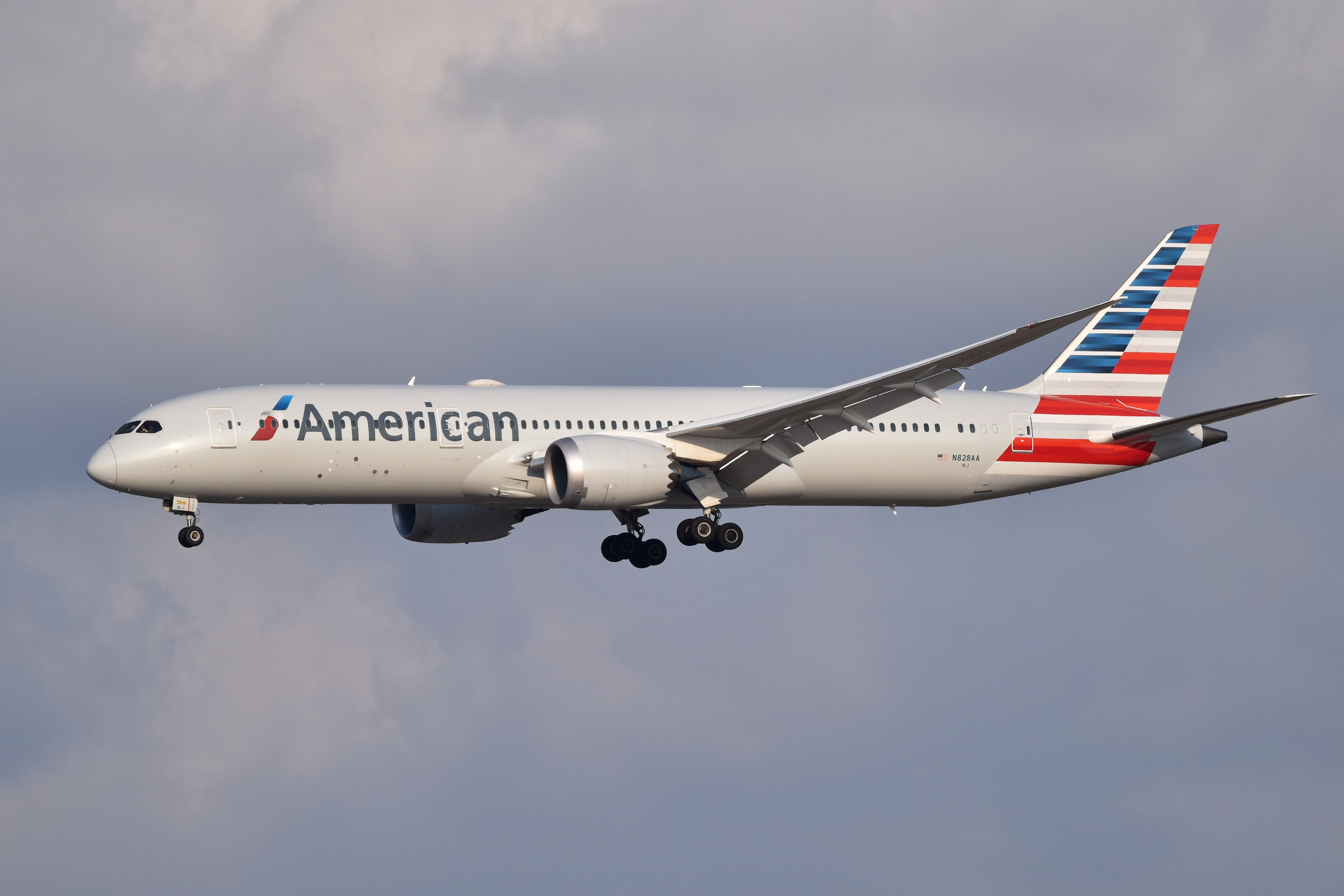
American Airlines Boeing 787-9 Dreamlier

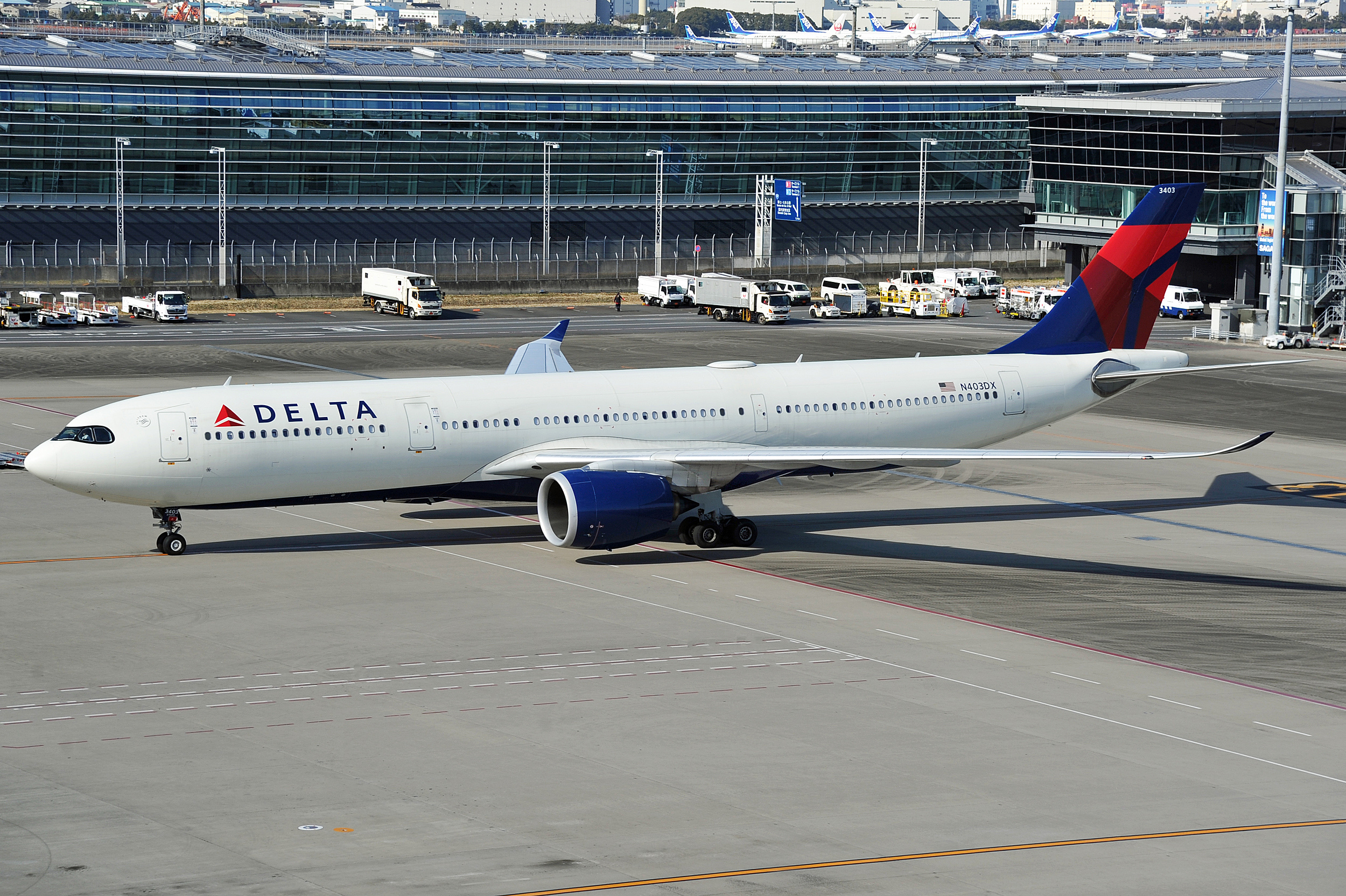
Delta Air Lines Airbus A330-900

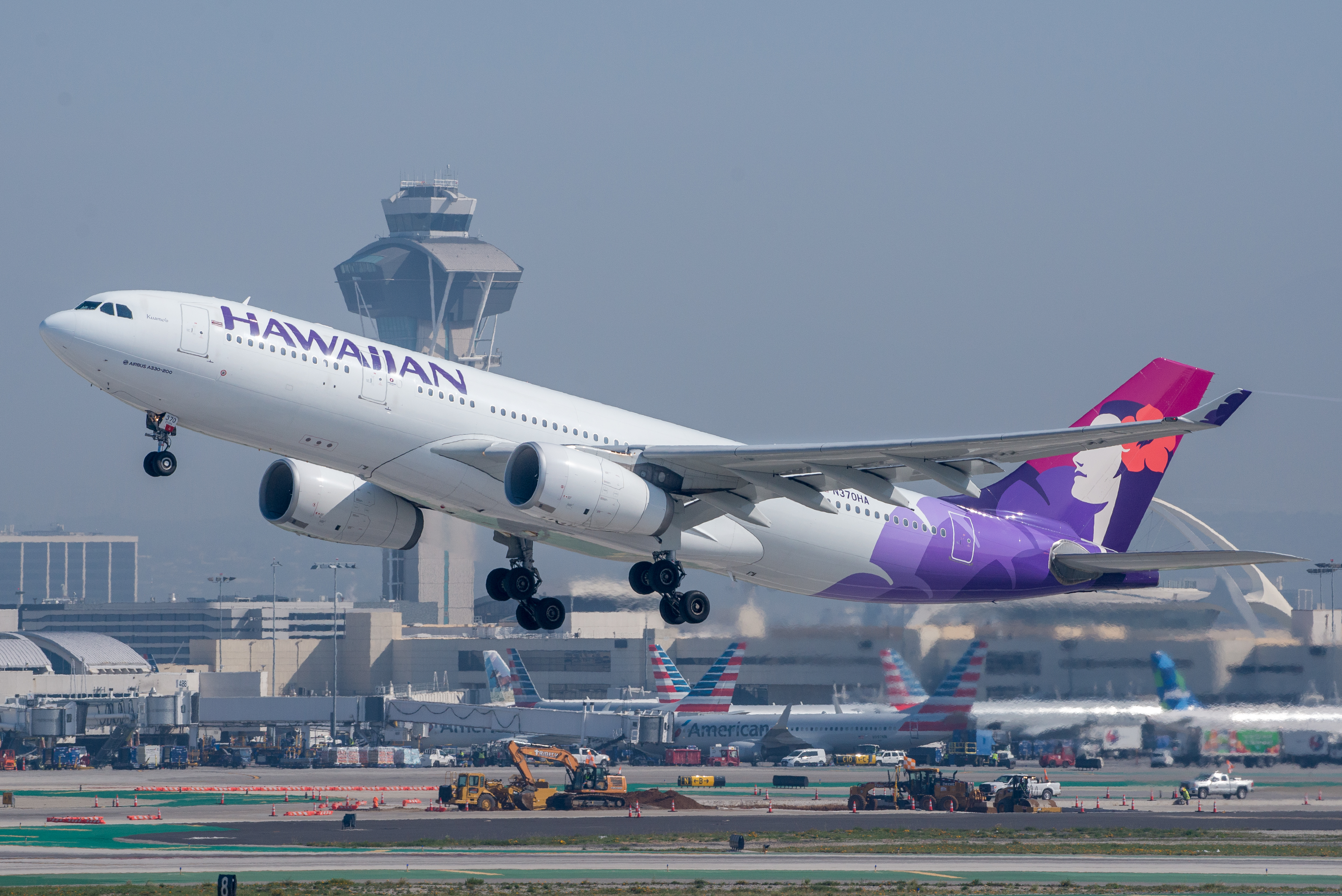
Hawaiian Airlines Airbus A330-200

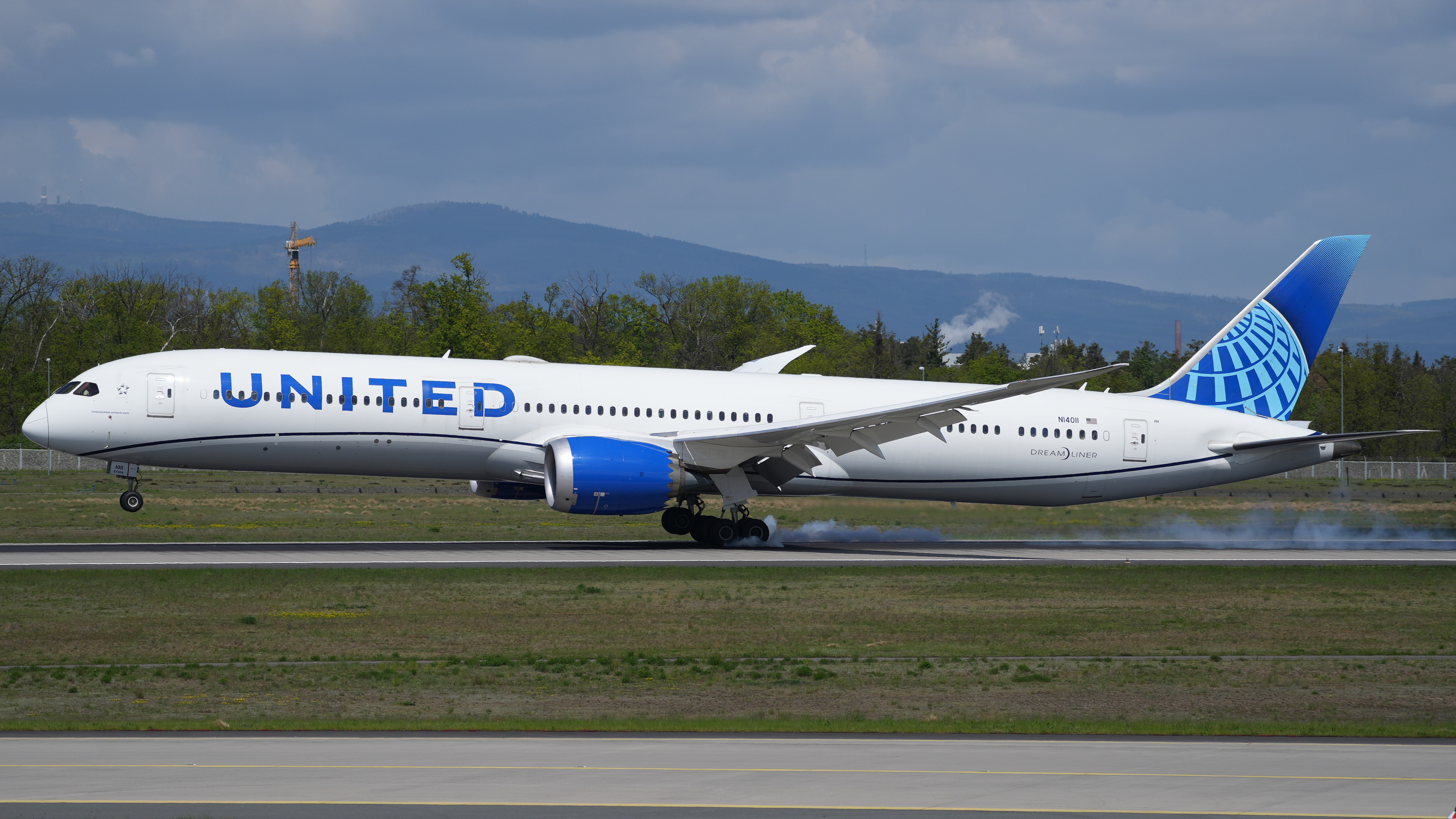
United Airlines Boeing 787-10 Dreamiler

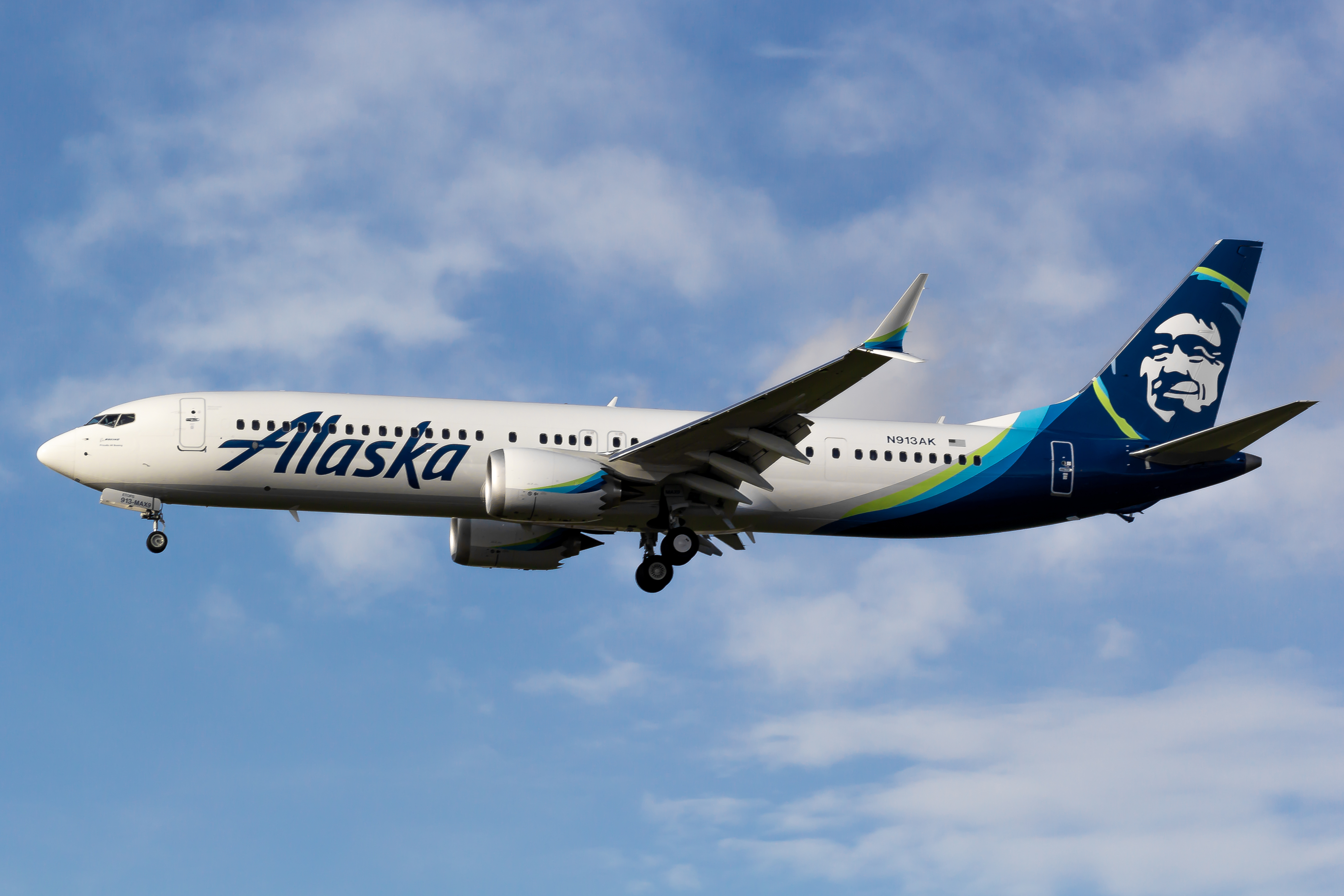
Alaska Airlines Boeing 737 MAX 9

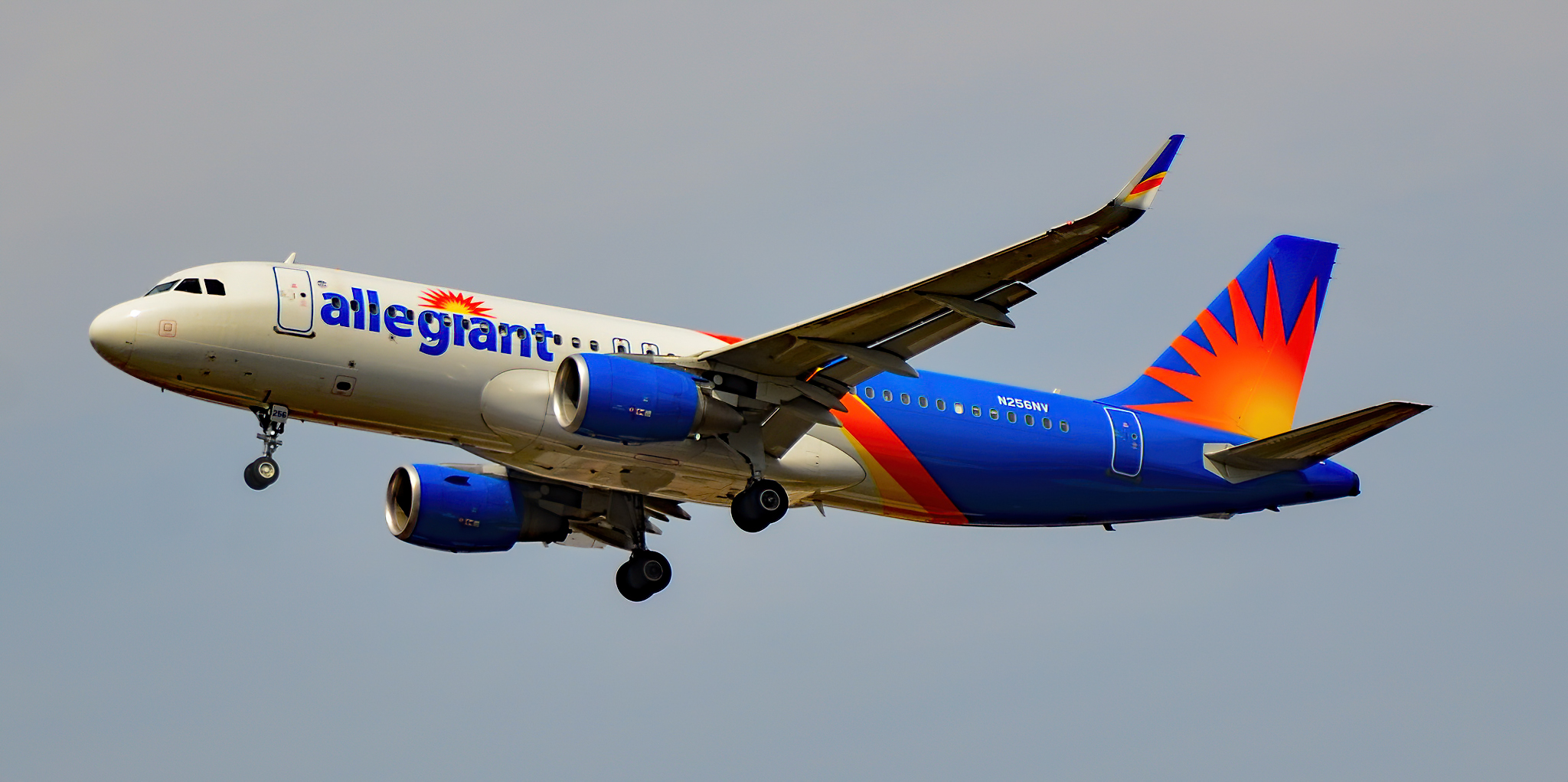
Allegiant Air Airbus A320-200

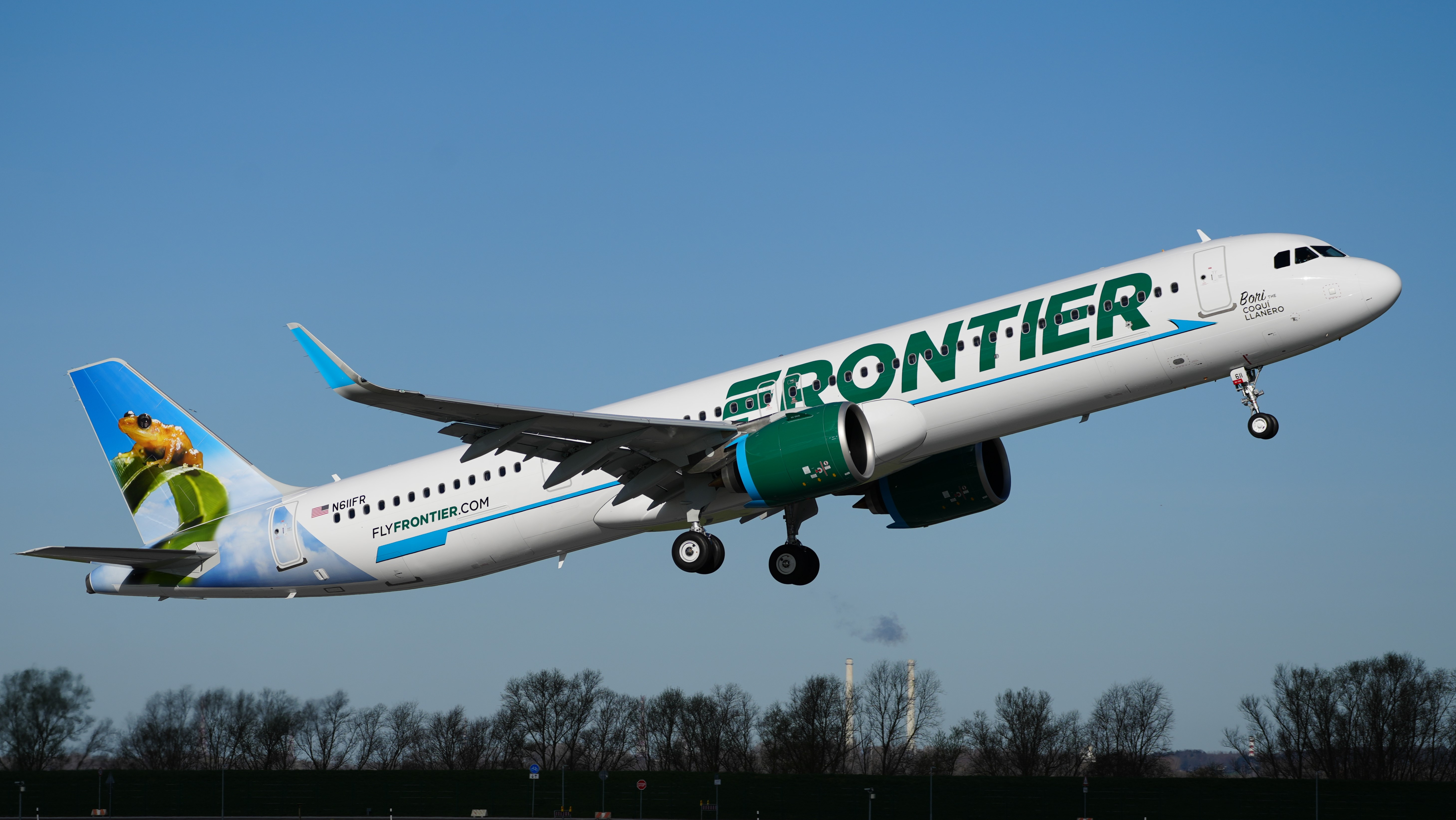
Frontier Airlines Airbus A321neo

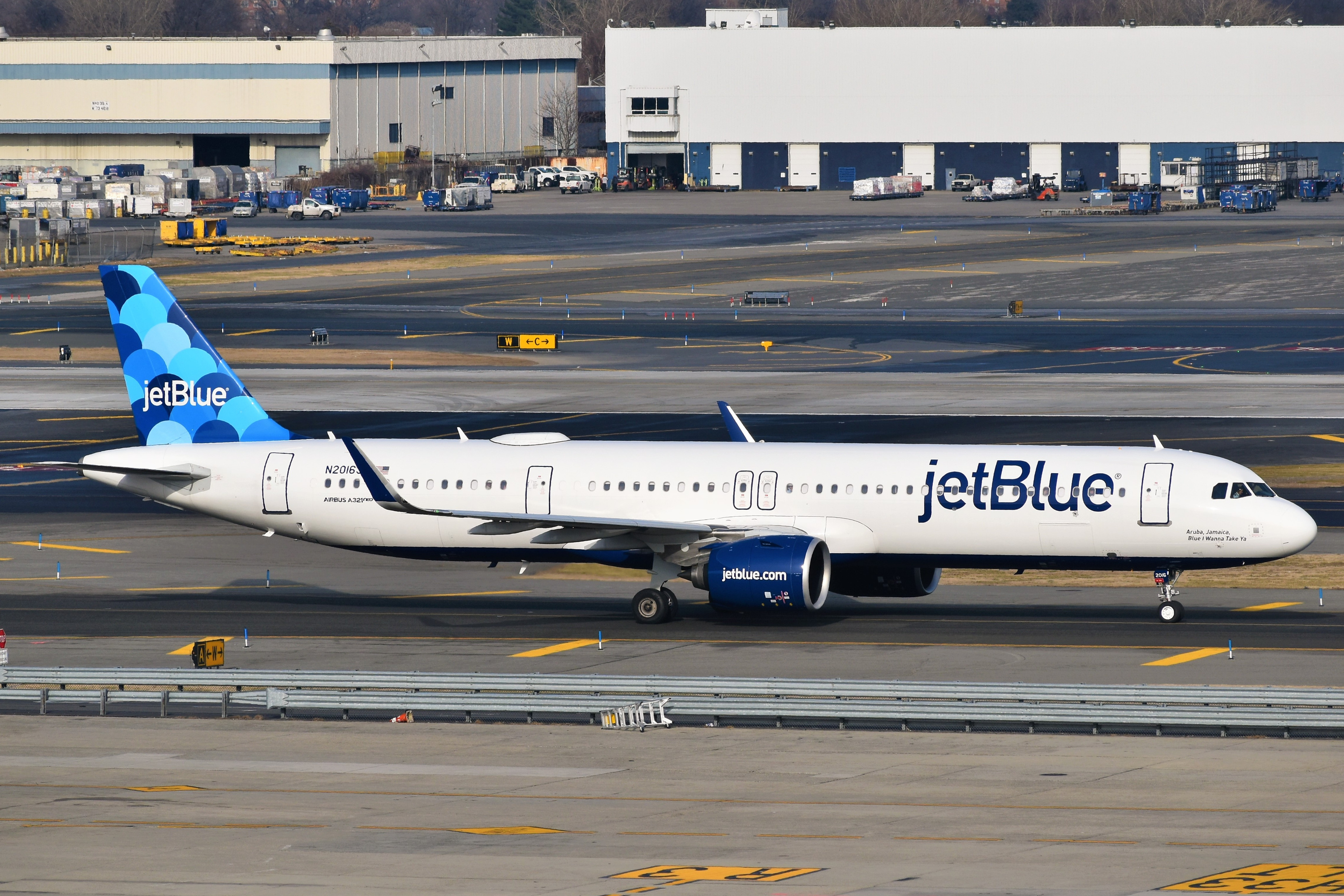
Jetblue Airbus A321neo

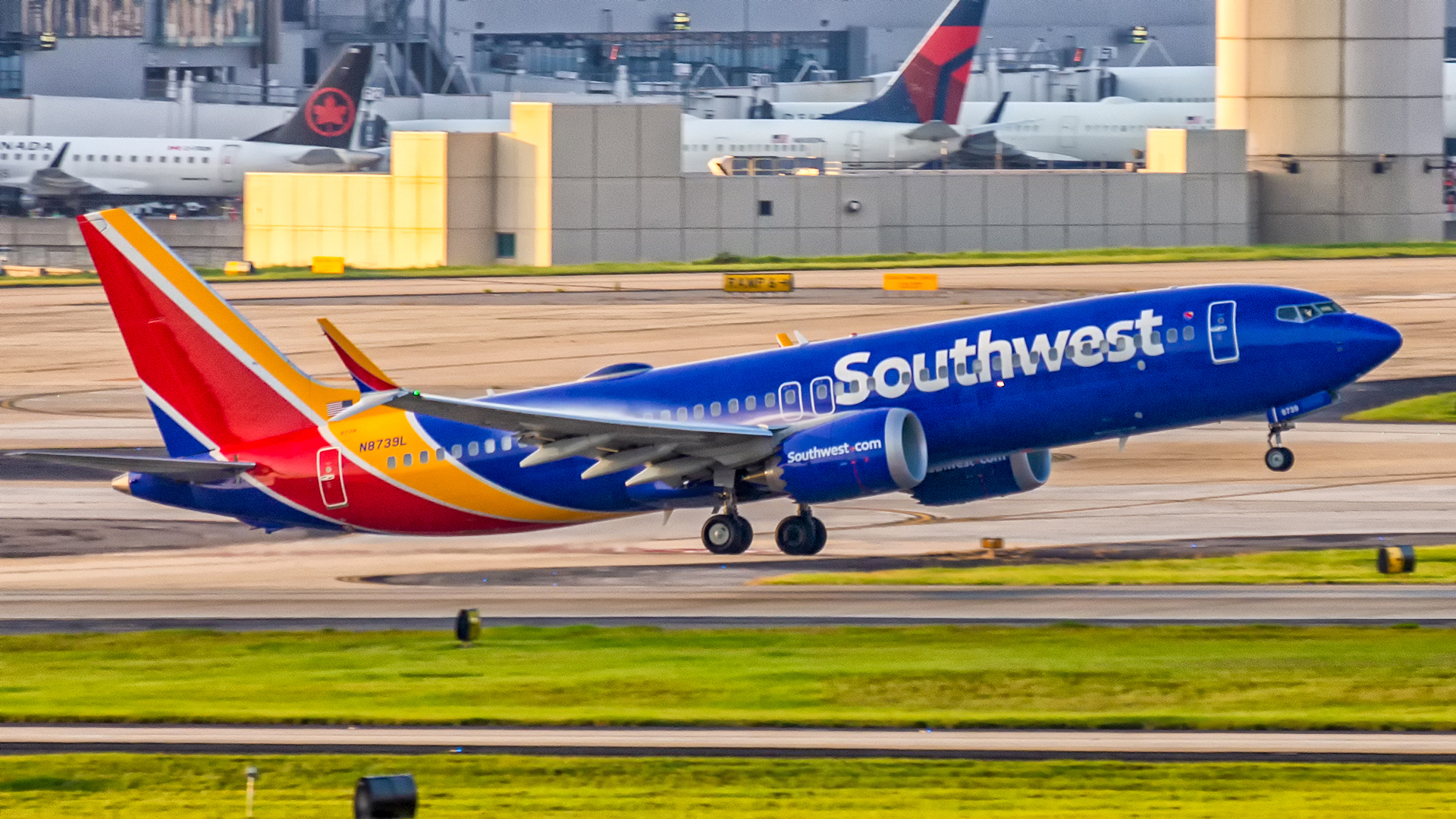
Southwest Airlines Boeing 737 MAX 8

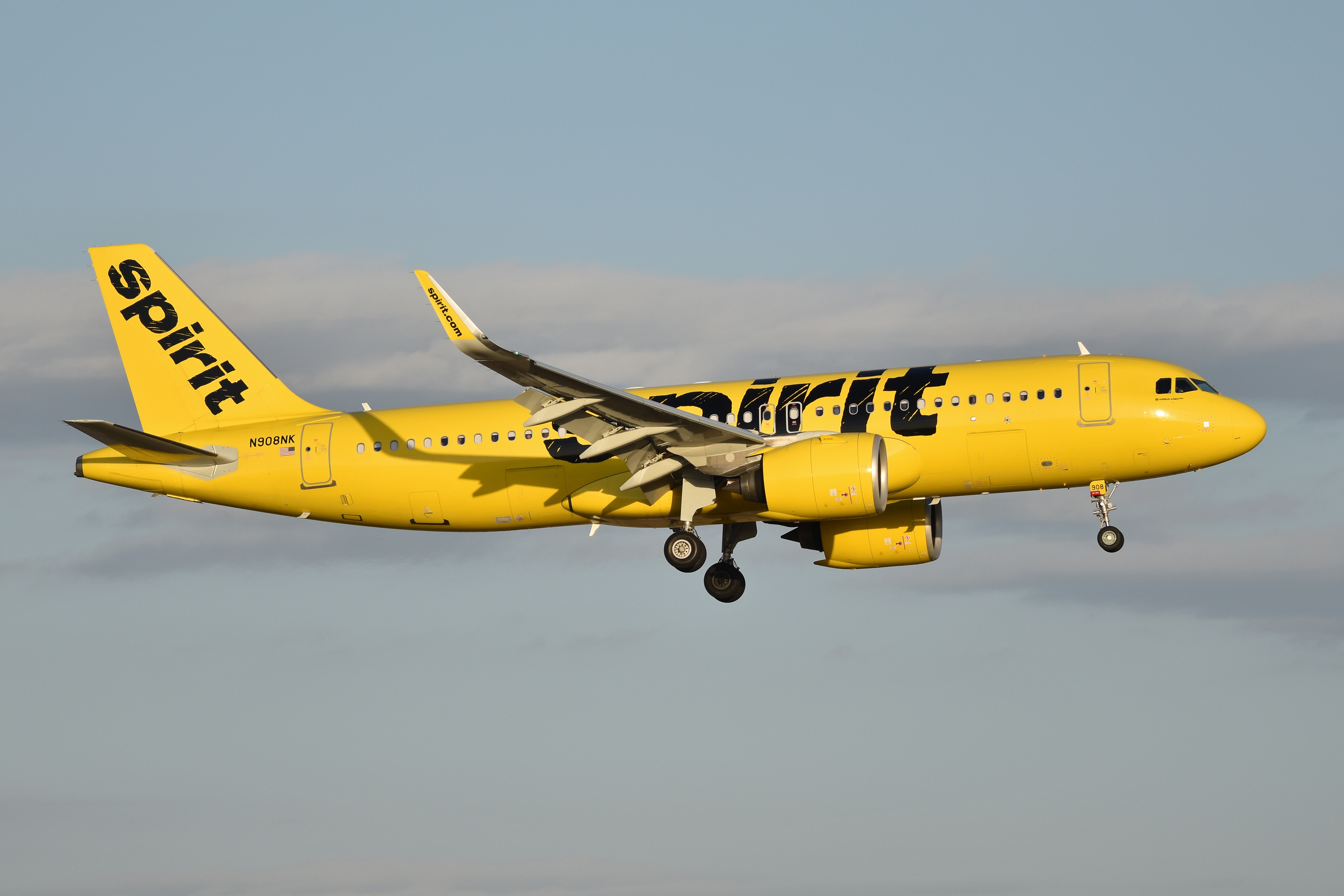
Spirit Airlines Airbus A320neo

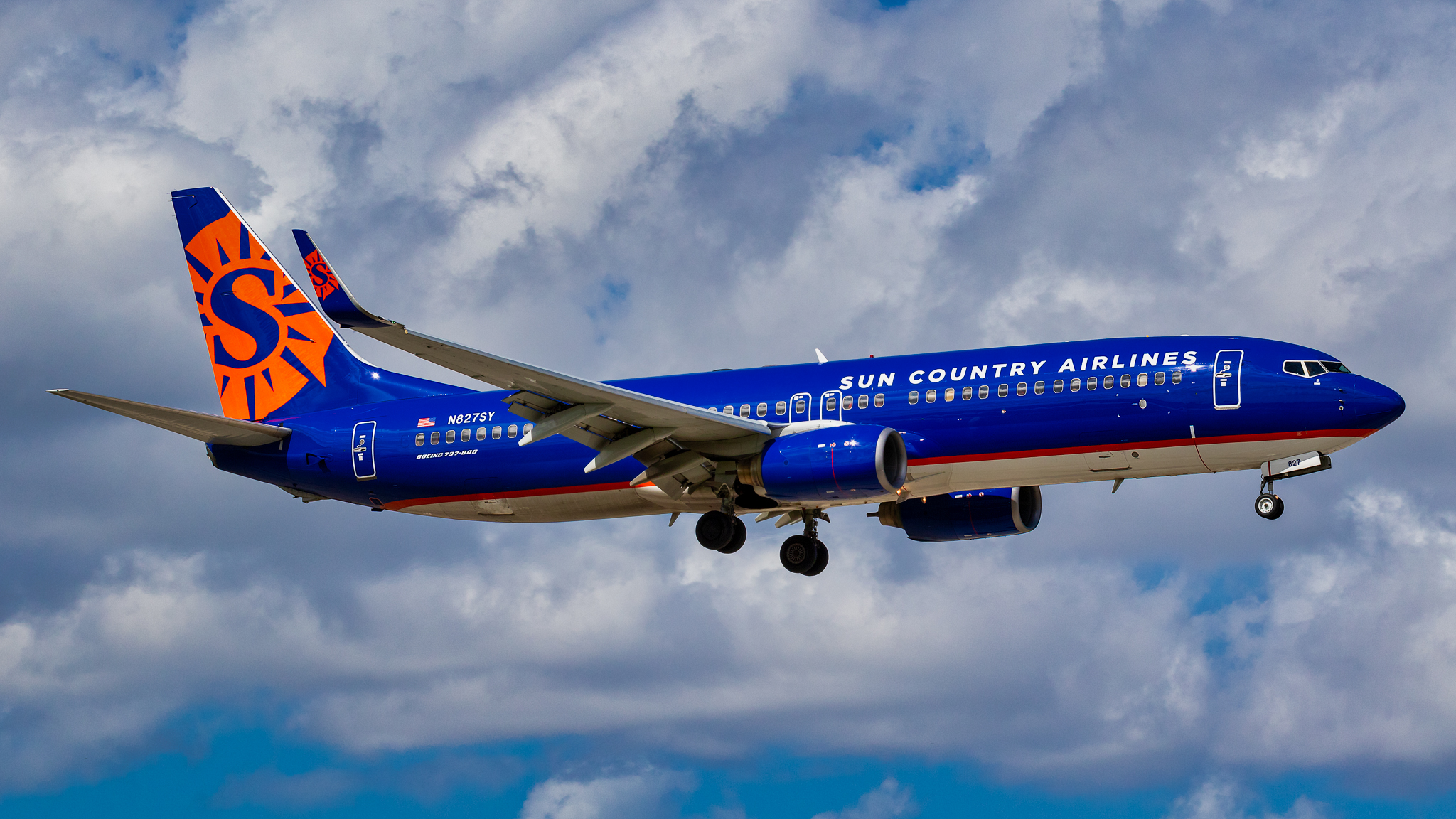
Sun Country Airlines Boeing 737-800

- Advanced Air
- Air Sunshine
- Air Wisconsin
- Alaska Airlines
- Alaska Central Express
- Allegiant Air
- American Airlines
- American Eagle
- Ameristar Jet Charter
- Avelo Airlines
- Bemidji Airlines
- Bering Air
- Berry Aviation
- Bighorn Airways
- Big Island Air
- Boutique Air
- Breeze Airways
- Cape Air
- Colorado Airways
- CommutAir
- Contour Airlines
- Crystal Airways
- Delta Air Lines
- Delta Private Charters
- Denver Air Connection
- Diamond International Airlines
- Eastern Airlines
- Endeavor Air
- Envoy Air
- Everts Air
- Flight Express
- Flight International
- Freight Runners Express
- Frontier Airlines
- FS Air Service
- Gem Air
- Global Crossing Airlines (GlobalX Airlines)
- GoJet Airlines
- Grand Canyon Airlines
- Grand Canyon Scenic Airlines
- Grant Aviation
- Griffling Flying Service
- Hawaiian Airlines
- Hornet Airlines
- Horizon Air
- I-Jet Caribbean
- Inland Aviation Services
- Island Airways
- jetBlue Airways
- JSX
- Justice Prisoner Air Transportation System
- Kalitta Charters
- Kenmore Air
- Key Lime Air
- Key West Airlines
- Louisiana Airways
- Merlin Airways
- Mesa Airlines
- Mexus Airlines
- Mokulele Airlines
- Nantucket Airlines
- National Airlines
- New England Airlines
- Northern Pacific Airways
- Omni Air International
- Penobscot Air
- Piedmont Airlines
- Pinnacle Airlines
- PSA Airlines
- Reliant Air
- Republic Airways
- Salmon Air
- San Juan Airlines
- Servant Air
- Sierra Pacific Airlines
- Silver Airways
- Skagway Air Service
- Sky King Airlines
- Skyway Enterprises
- SkyWest Airlines
- Southern Airways Express
- Southwest Airlines
- Spirit Airlines (Bankrupt)
- Sportsflight Airways
- Surf Air
- Sun Country Airlines
- Sundance Air
- Sunship1 Airlines
- Superior Aviation
- Taquan Air
- Tradewind Aviation
- Ultimate Jet
- United Airlines
- United Express
- Utah Airways
- USA Jet Airlines
- Victory Air Transport
- Wagner Airways
- Warbelow's Air Ventures
- West Air
- Wright Air Service

=== South America ===
Contents: Top - A B C D E F G H I J K L M N O P Q R S T U V W X Y Z

==== Argentina ====
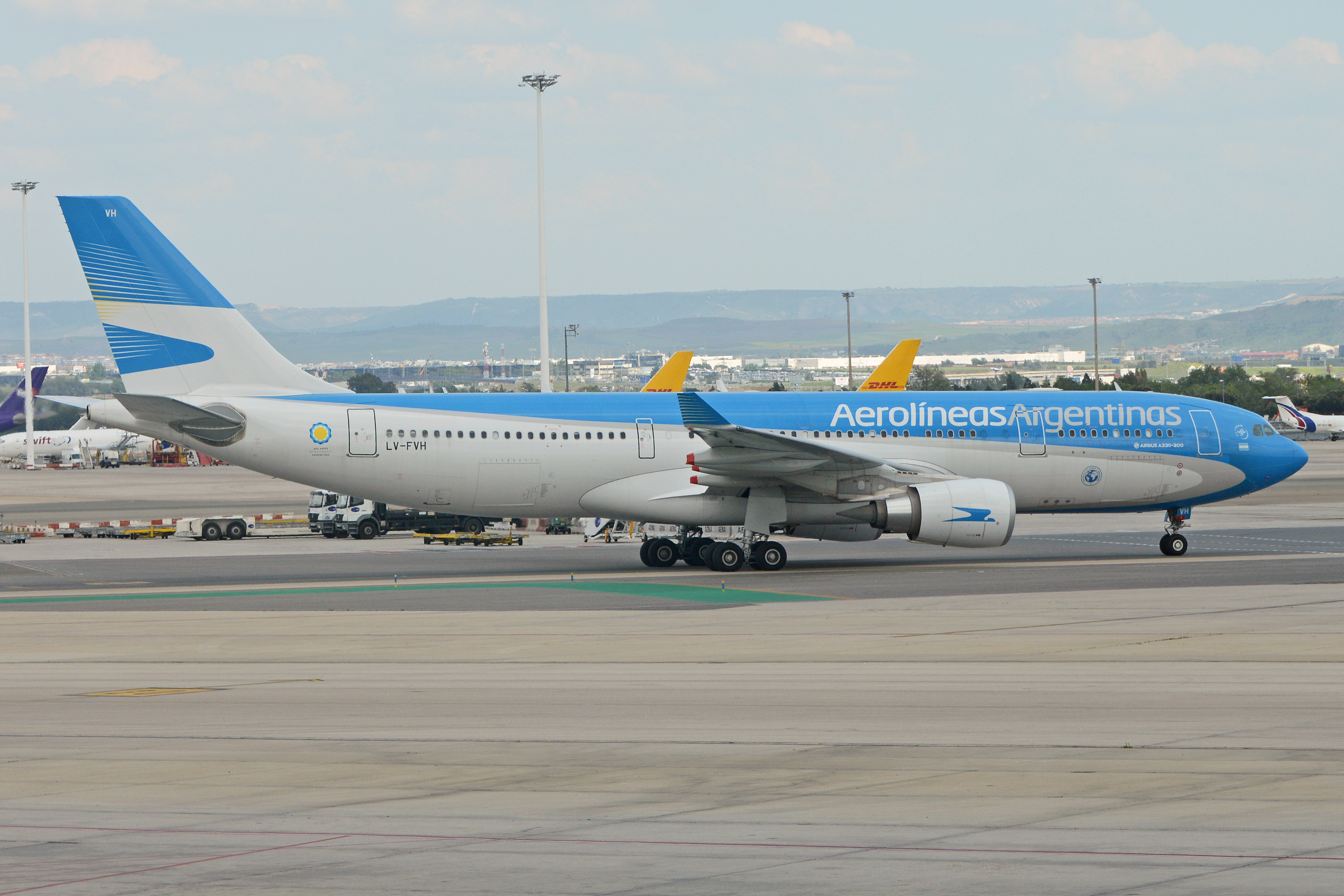
Aerolíneas Argentinas Airbus A330-200

- Aerolíneas Argentinas
- Andes Líneas Aéreas
- Baires Fly
- Flybondi
- JetSmart Argentina
- LADE

==== Bolivia ====
- Boliviana de Aviación
- EcoJet (airline)
- Línea Aérea Amaszonas

==== Brazil ====
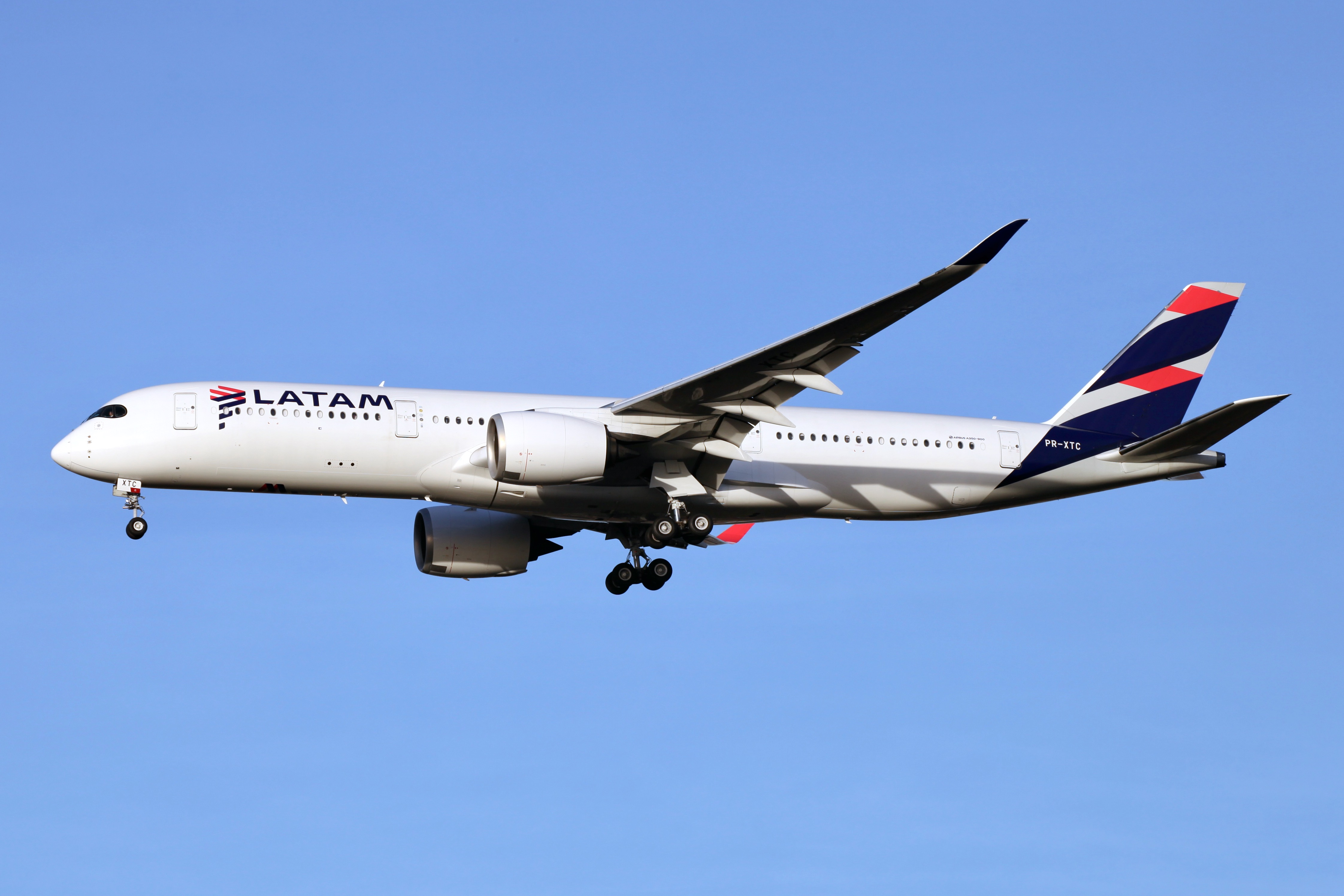
LATAM Brasil Airbus A350-900

- Azul Brazilian Airlines (Azul Linhas Aéreas Brasileiras)
- Azul Conecta
- Gol Transportes Aéreos (English: Gol Intelligent Airline) (Gol Linhas Aéreas Inteligentes)
- LATAM Brasil
- MAP Airlines (MAP Linhas Aéreas)
- Passaredo Airlines (Passaredo Linhas Aéreas)
- Sideral Linhas Aéreas
- Total Linhas Aéreas
- Voepass Linhas Aéreas

==== Chile ====
- Aerocardal
- Aerovías DAP
- JetSmart
- LATAM Chile
- LATAM Express
- Sky Airline

==== Colombia ====
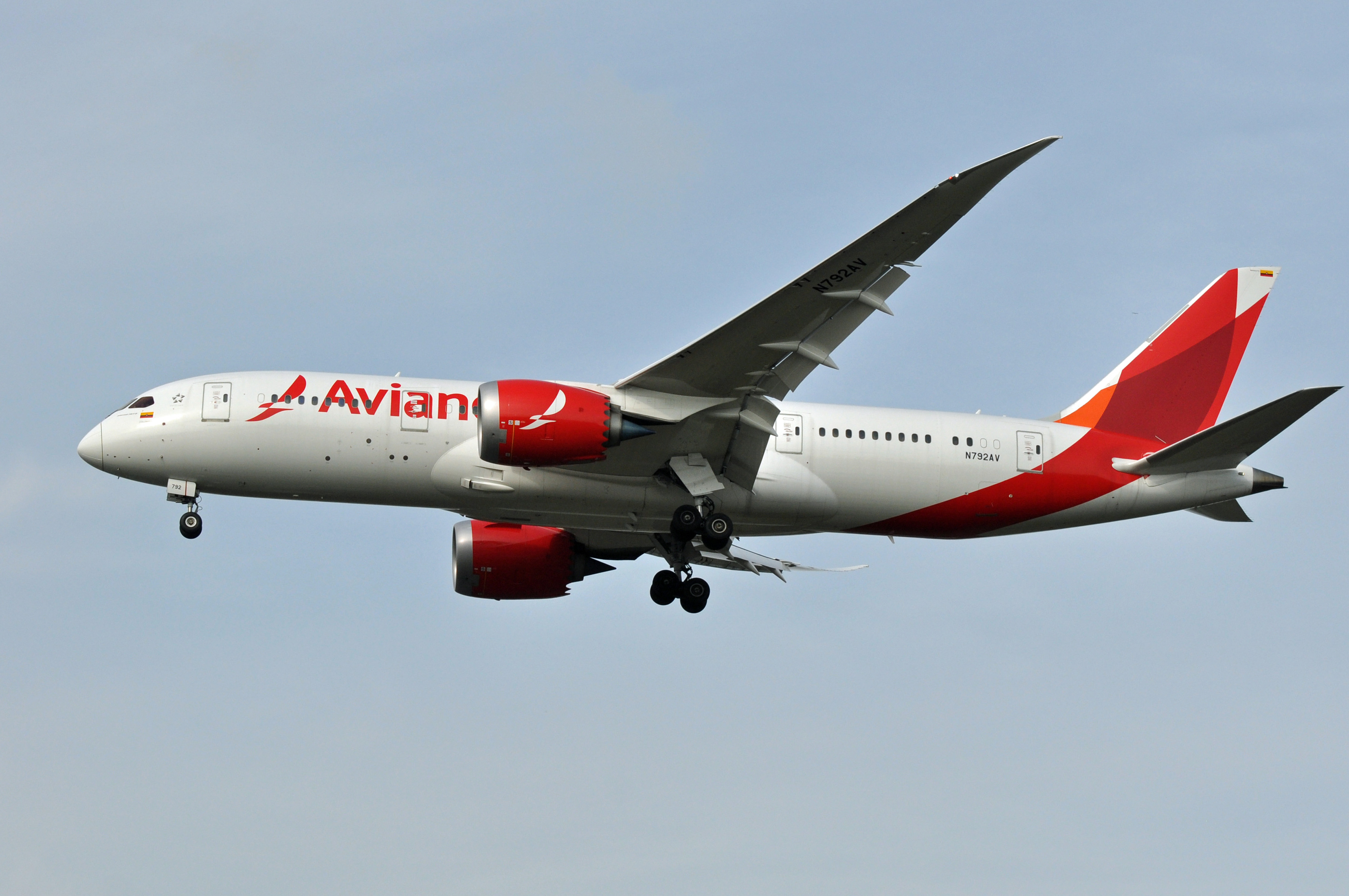
Avianca Boeing 787-8 Dreamliner

- Avianca
- Avianca Express
- EasyFly
- Heliandes
- LATAM Colombia
- SATENA
- Wingo

==== Ecuador ====
- Avianca Ecuador
- LATAM Ecuador
- SAEREO

==== French Guiana ====
- Air Guyane

==== Falkland Islands ====
- Falkland Islands Government Air Service (FIGAS)

==== Guyana ====
- Air Services Limited
- Domestic Airways
- Fenix Aviation
- Golden Arrow Airways
- Hinterland Aviation Inc (company of identical name in Australia, not sure if related)
- Jags Aviation
- Oxford Aviation
- Roraima Airways
- Trans Guyana Airways

==== Paraguay ====
- LATAM Paraguay
- Paranair
- Sol del Paraguay

==== Peru ====
- LATAM Perú
- Movil Air
- SAETA Peru
- Star Peru

==== Suriname ====
- Blue Wing Airlines
- Surinam Airways

==== Uruguay ====
- Aeromas
- Air Class Líneas Aéreas

==== Venezuela ====
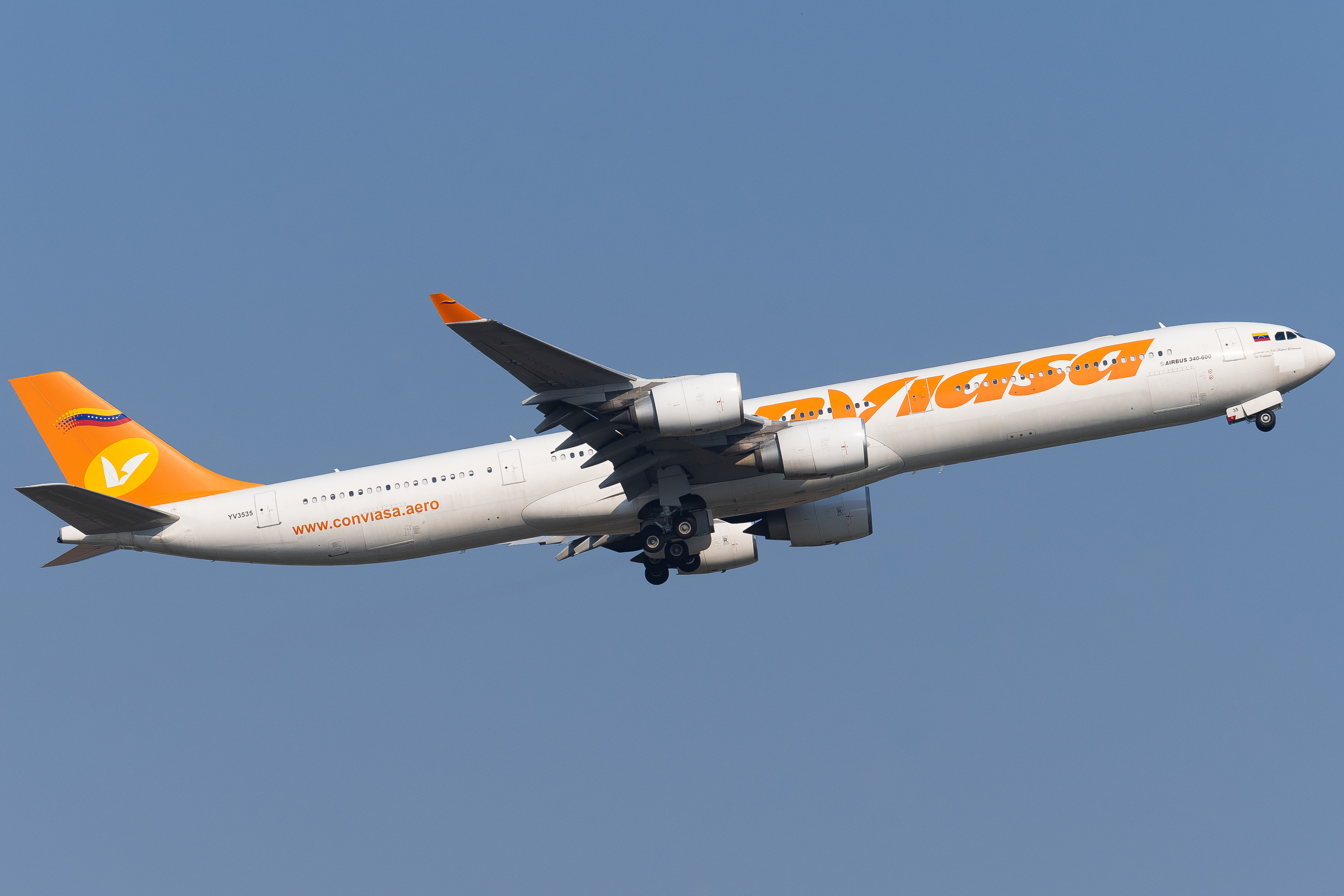
Conviasa Airbus A340-600

- Aero Ejecutivos
- Aeropostal Alas de Venezuela
- Avior Airlines
- Conviasa
- LAI - Línea Aérea IAACA
- Laser Airlines
- Rutaca
- Sol America
- Venezolana

== See also ==
- Airline call sign
- Cargo airline
- IATA airline designator
- ICAO airline designator
- List of accidents and incidents involving commercial aircraft
- Lists of airlines
- List of defunct airlines
- List of largest airlines
- List of low-cost airlines
- List of national airlines
