= Presidente Nicolau Lobato International Airport =

International airport in Dili, Timor-Leste

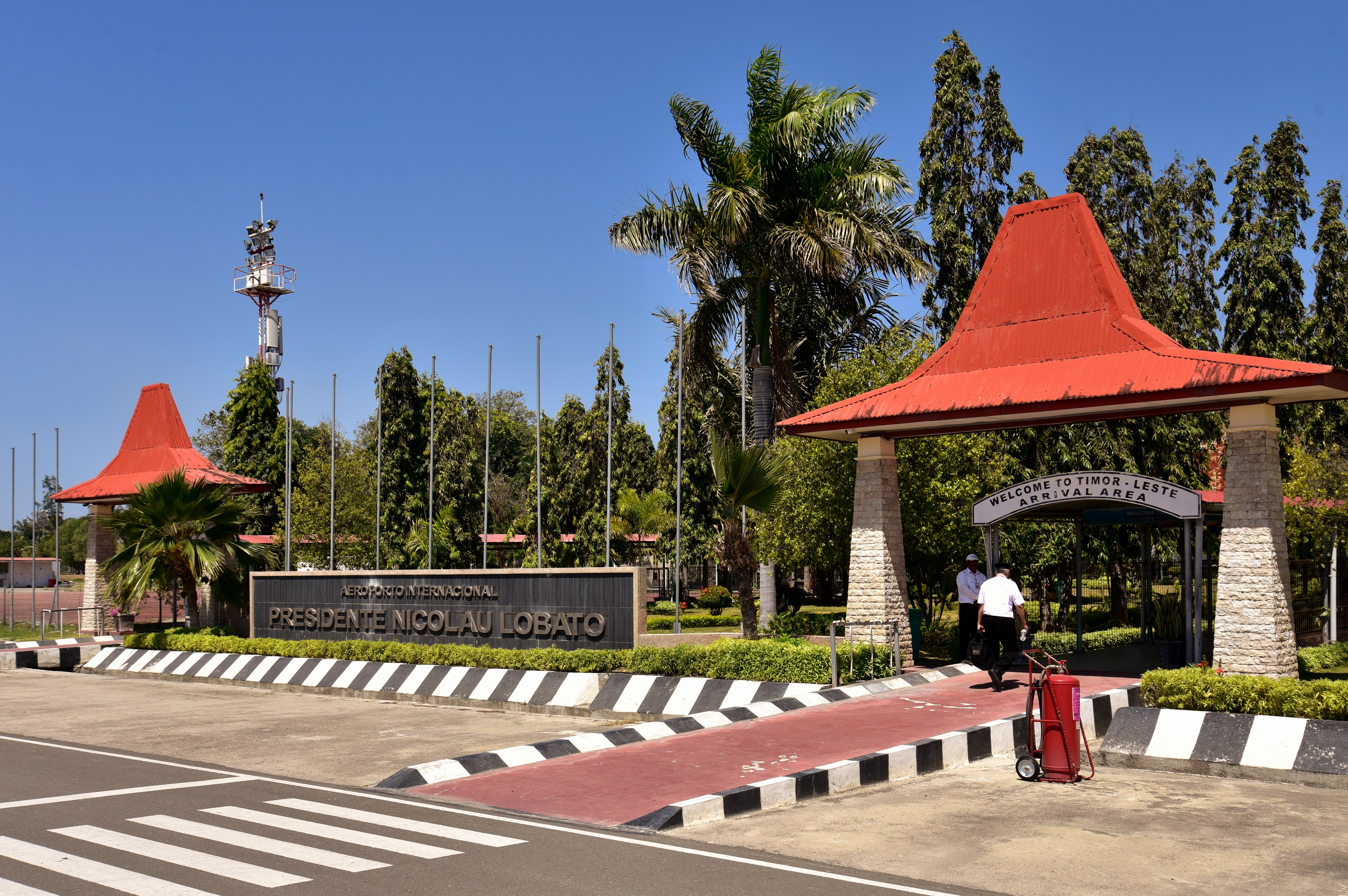
- IATA: DIL; ICAO: WPDL; WMO: 97390

Summary
- Airport type: Public
- Owner: Ministry of Transport and Communications
- Operator: Air Navigation Administration Timor Leste (ANATL)
- Serves: Dili, Timor-Leste
- Location: Madohi, Dom Aleixo, Dili
- Hub for: Aero Dili
- Time zone: TLT (+09:00)
- Elevation AMSL: 25 ft (7.6 m)
- Coordinates: 08°32′47″S 125°31′29″E

Map
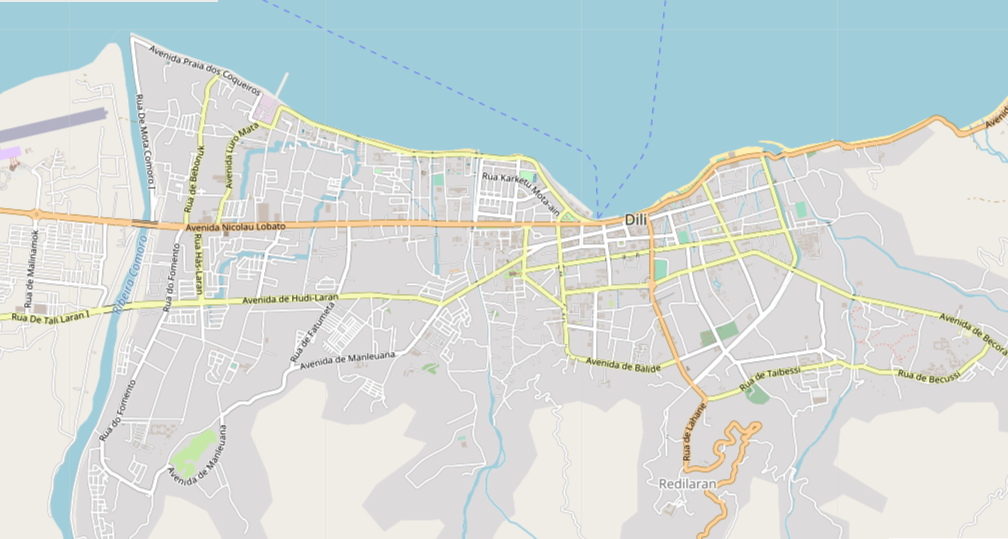
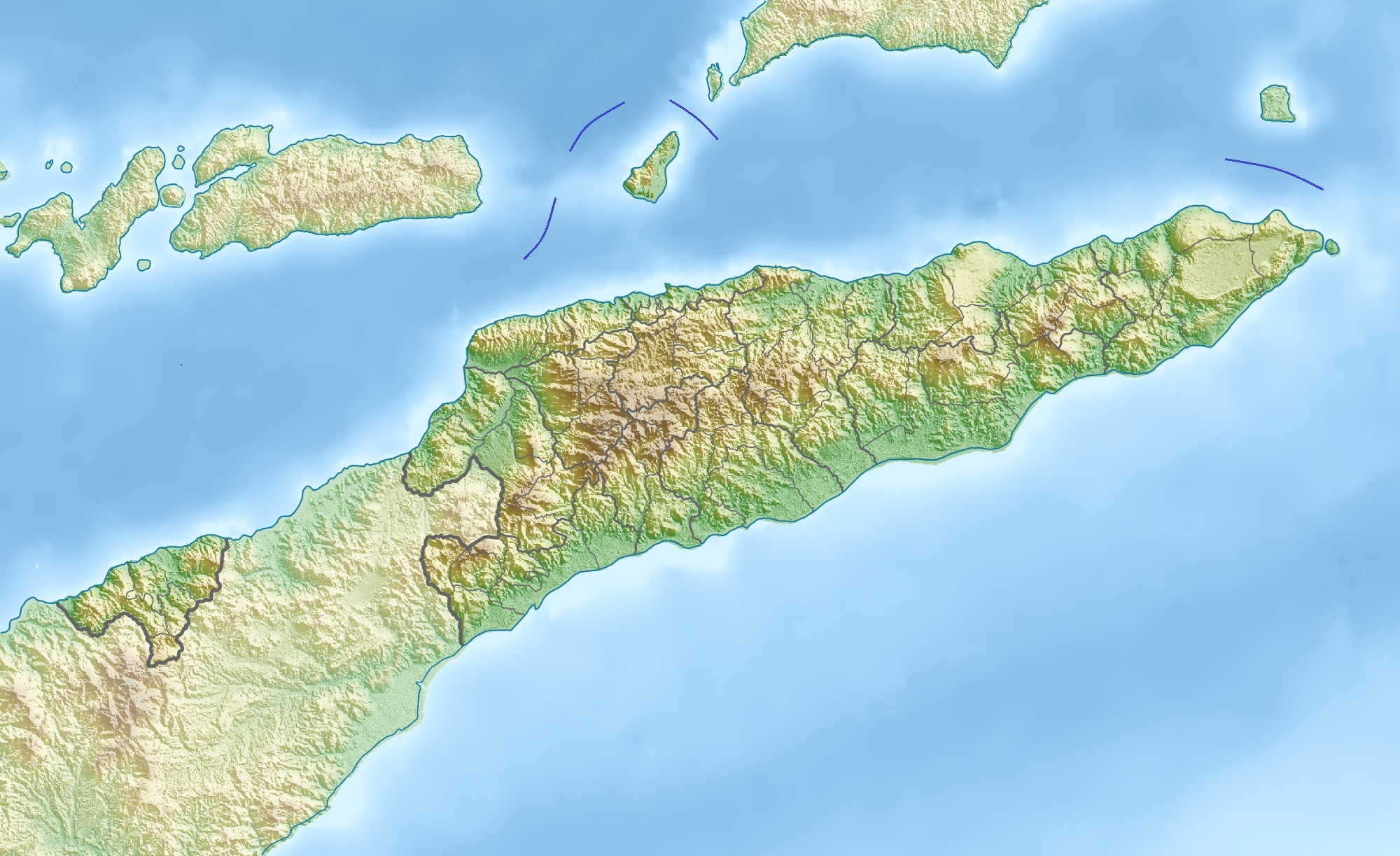
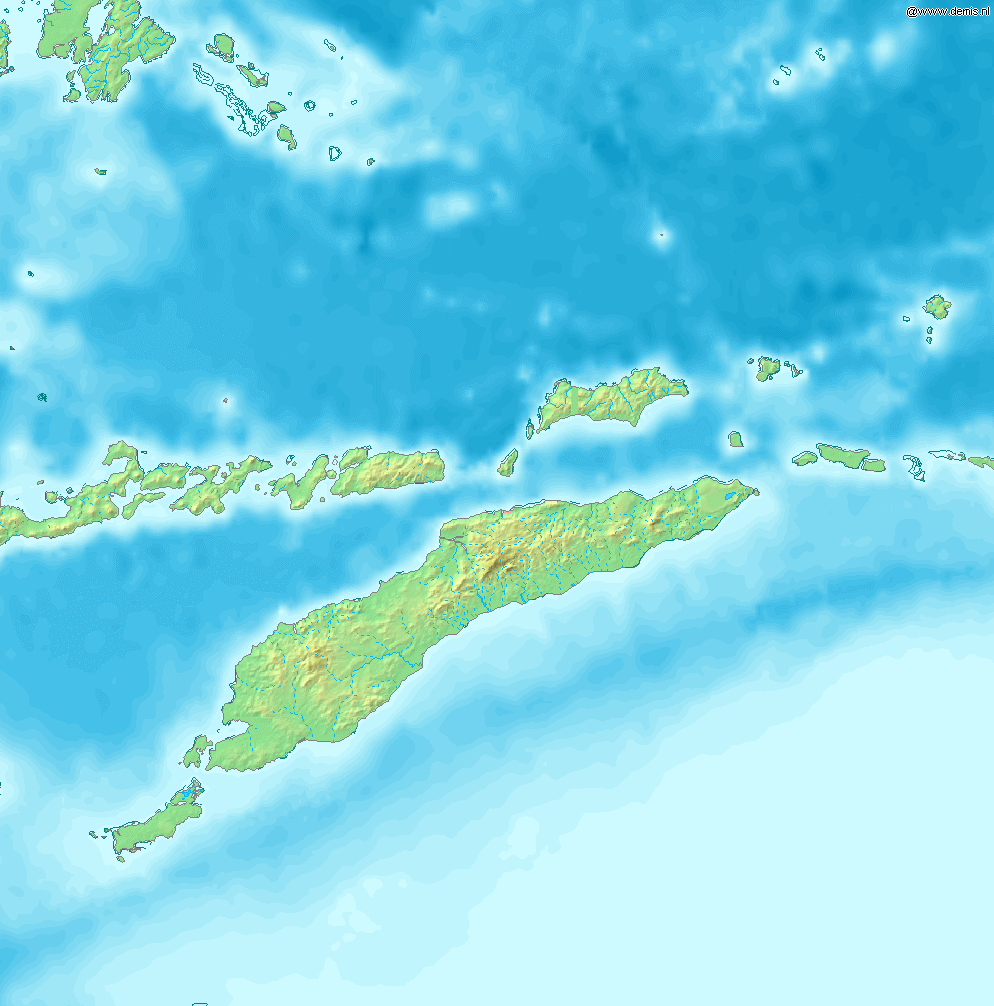
- Location in Dili Location in Timor-Leste Location in Timor Location in Southeast Asia DIL/WPDL (Asia)

Runways
| Direction | Length | | Surface |
| Direction | m | ft | Surface |
|---|---|---|---|
| 08/26 | 1,850 | 6,070 | Asphalt |
- Sources: AIP Timor-Leste, JICA, WFP

Dili Airport (IATA: DIL, ICAO: WPDL), officially Presidente Nicolau Lobato International Airport (Portuguese: Aeroporto Internacional Presidente Nicolau Lobato, Tetun: Aeroportu Internasional Presidente Nicolau Lobato), and formerly Comoro Airport (Indonesian: Bandar Udara Komoro), is an international airport serving Dili, the capital city of Timor-Leste. Since 2002, the airport has been named after Nicolau dos Reis Lobato (1946–1978), an East Timorese politician and national hero.

== Location ==
The airport is located in the suco of Madohi, which is part of the Dom Aleixo administrative post, in the western suburbs of Dili. It faces the Ombai Strait to its north and west, and the Comoro River to its east. Its runway (08/26) runs broadly east–west.

North of the airport, between the runway and Ombai Strait, is a residential zone that includes houses, a small area of agricultural land, a school, a church, and a cemetery. At the zone's northern edge is Beto Tasi Beach, a hidden stretch of shoreline known to the local community and also used for fishing.

== History ==
=== 1939–1975 ===
The airport was built prior to World War II by the colonial administration of the then Portuguese Timor. Initially, it had an 800 m-long (2,600 ft) runway. It also soon became an operating base for Transportes Aéreos de Timor (TAT), which was founded in July 1939 as the colony's national airline.

In May 1939, the Portuguese government gave permission to Qantas to operate a Darwin to Dili flight. However, due to objections from the Japanese government, the Qantas services were postponed for more than a year. Eventually, in December 1940, the fortnightly Qantas Darwin to Batavia service was authorised to stop in Dili. The following month, Dili replaced Kupang as the stopover for Qantas's fortnightly Darwin to Singapore service. As compensation, Dai Nippon Airways of Japan was permitted to operate six trial flights from Palau to Dili between December 1940 and June 1941. In October 1941, the Japanese government announced plans to introduce regular air services between Tokyo and Dili, beginning the next month.

All of these flights were operated by flying boats, not by land-based aircraft needing to use a landing strip. At that time, Dili did not have the facilities required to handle Qantas's de Havilland D.H.86 land-based aircraft. The flying boat services have also been described as "pseudo-commercial", as they were of "negligible commercial importance", and used for "political penetration" in the lead-up to the Pacific War of 1941–1945. A radio room was set up in the Dili post office to communicate with the flying boats, using equipment supplied by the Australian Department of Civil Aviation.

Meanwhile, during 1940, TAT began flying a weekly land-based aircraft service between Dili and Kupang, using a de Havilland Dragon Rapide wet-leased from Koninklijke Nederlandsch-Indische Luchtvaart Maatschappij (KNILM), the airline of the then Dutch East Indies. Those services continued, again for political reasons, even after April 1941, by which time TAT was six months behind in paying the lease fees and salaries of the pilot and mechanic.

On 17 December 1941, soon after the beginning of the Pacific War, Dutch and Australian forces landed in Dili, with the objective of occupying the neutral territory of Portuguese Timor "... to defend against Japanese aggression ..." The 2nd Australian Independent Company took control of the airport. By 17 February 1942, the Allies had changed their stance, and arrangements had been made for their forces in Dili to hand over to a reinforced Portuguese garrison. On 20 February 1942, however, an Imperial Japanese Navy (IJN) invasion force landed to the west of the airport and captured it by 11:00 am. The radio equipment at the Dili post office was later smuggled out, to the 2nd Australian Independent Company, which by then had retreated to Timor's central mountains. Subsequently, the Imperial Japanese Army Air Service (IJAAF) used the airport as a military airfield, and between June 1942 and August 1944, it was bombed by Allied aircraft.

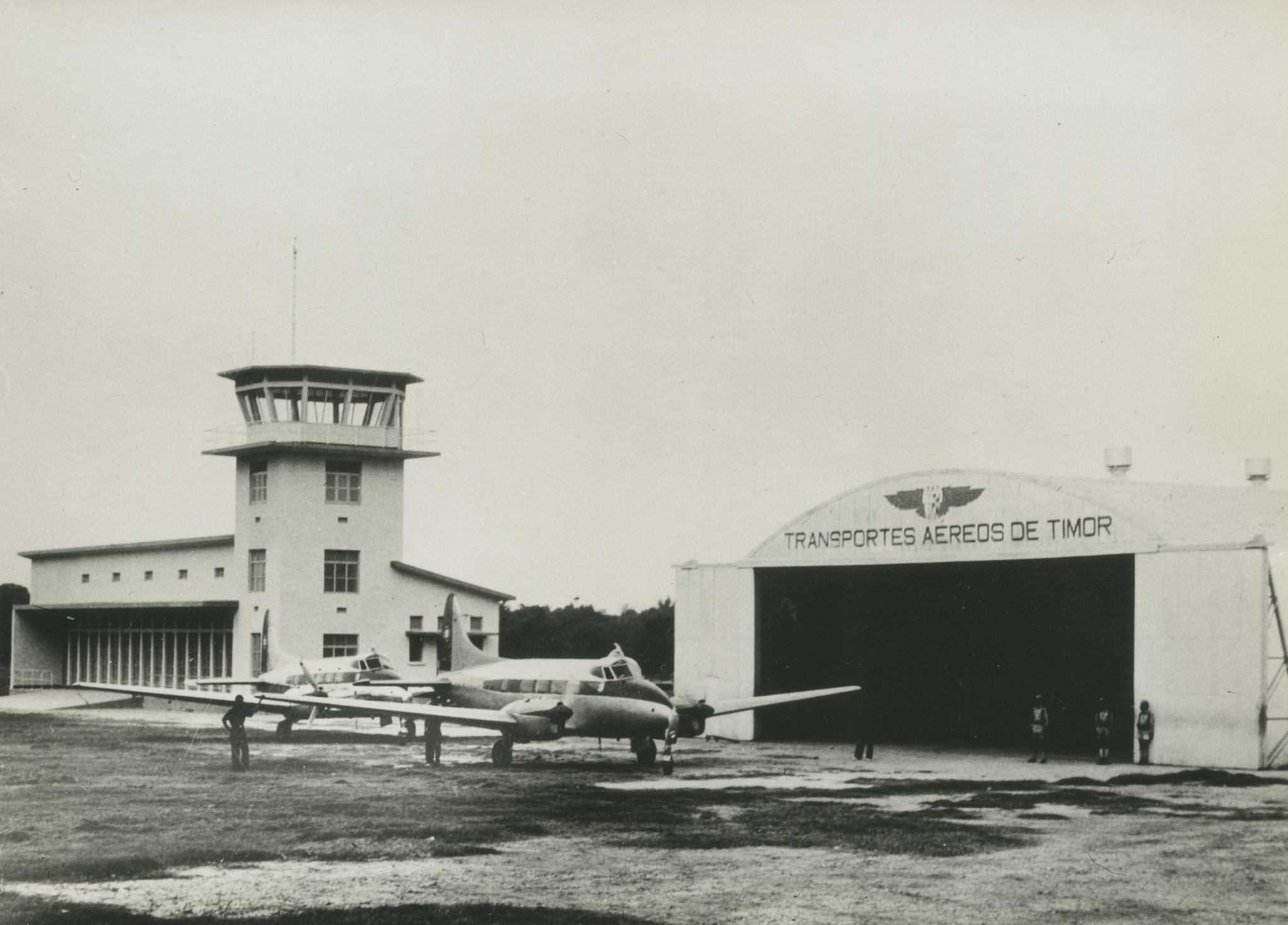
The TAT hangar at the airport

By the end of the Pacific War, the airport was disused and overgrown. Japanese forces continued to occupy it until 11 September 1945, when the garrison at Dili officially surrendered.

In post-war Portuguese Timor, Baucau Airport, which was opened in 1947, and was and still is equipped with a much longer runway, became the colony's main airport, including for international flights. Dili airport was used for domestic services.

As of 1969, TAT was flying from Dili to six other places in the colony.

In 1974 and 1975, TAT operated scheduled domestic services from Dili to Atauro, Baucau, Maliana, Oecusse and Suai. The company was also flying between Dili and Kupang in West Timor, Indonesia, once a week, using a Douglas DC-3 chartered from Merpati Nusantara Airlines.

=== 1975–1999 ===
During the Indonesian occupation after 1975, the airport at Baucau was placed under the control of the Indonesian National Armed Forces, and was closed to civilian traffic, although at least nominally it remained accessible to large civilian airliners. Dili airport became the territory's principal civilian airport.

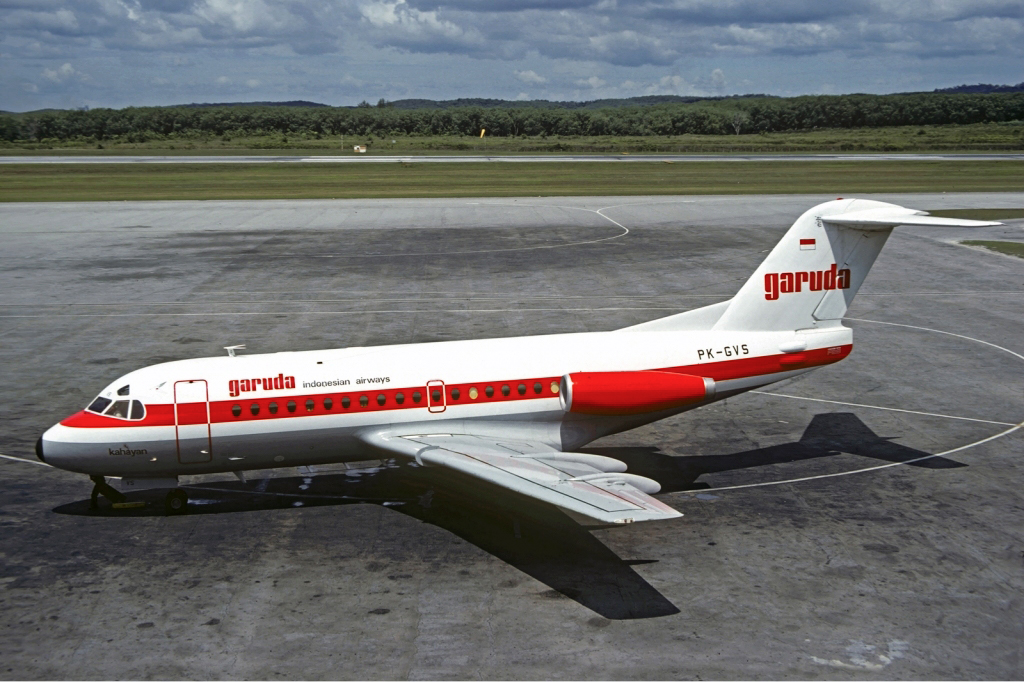
A Garuda Indonesia Fokker F28

In 1978, the Indonesian administration started work on rebuilding Dili airport, which it renamed as Comoro Airport (Indonesian: Bandar Udara Komoro). The work included the construction of a new passenger terminal building (without any custom, immigration and quarantine (CIQ) facilities), and the lengthening of the runway to accommodate Fokker F28s. In October 1978, Indonesia's State-owned flag carrier, Garuda Indonesia, inaugurated a Jakarta–Dili–Jakarta service. The full itinerary, which, initially, was flown three times a week, was Jakarta–Yogyakarta–Denpasar/Bali–Dili–Kupang–Denpasar/Bali. Tickets could be sold only to passengers who had a 'letter of transit' approved by a 'proper authority'. The leg from Jakarta to Denpasar/Bali was operated by a McDonnell Douglas DC-9, and that from Denpasar/Bali to Kupang by a Fokker F28. A connecting flight from Denpasar/Bali back to Jakarta was flown by a Douglas DC-8.

The rebuilding work at the airport was completed in 1981. As of 1983, Garuda Indonesia was operating flights between Dili and both Jakarta and Surabaya, using Fokker F28s. For each of those flights, the route flown was via Kupang and Denpasar/Bali. In April 1983, another Indonesian State-owned airline, Merpati, started operating a Kupang–Dili–Maliana–Covalima/Suai flight. As of 1985, that service was being flown twice a week, but it was later downgraded to one flight a week on a Dili–Covalima/Suai–Kupang routing, using an Indonesian-built CASA turboprop aircraft.

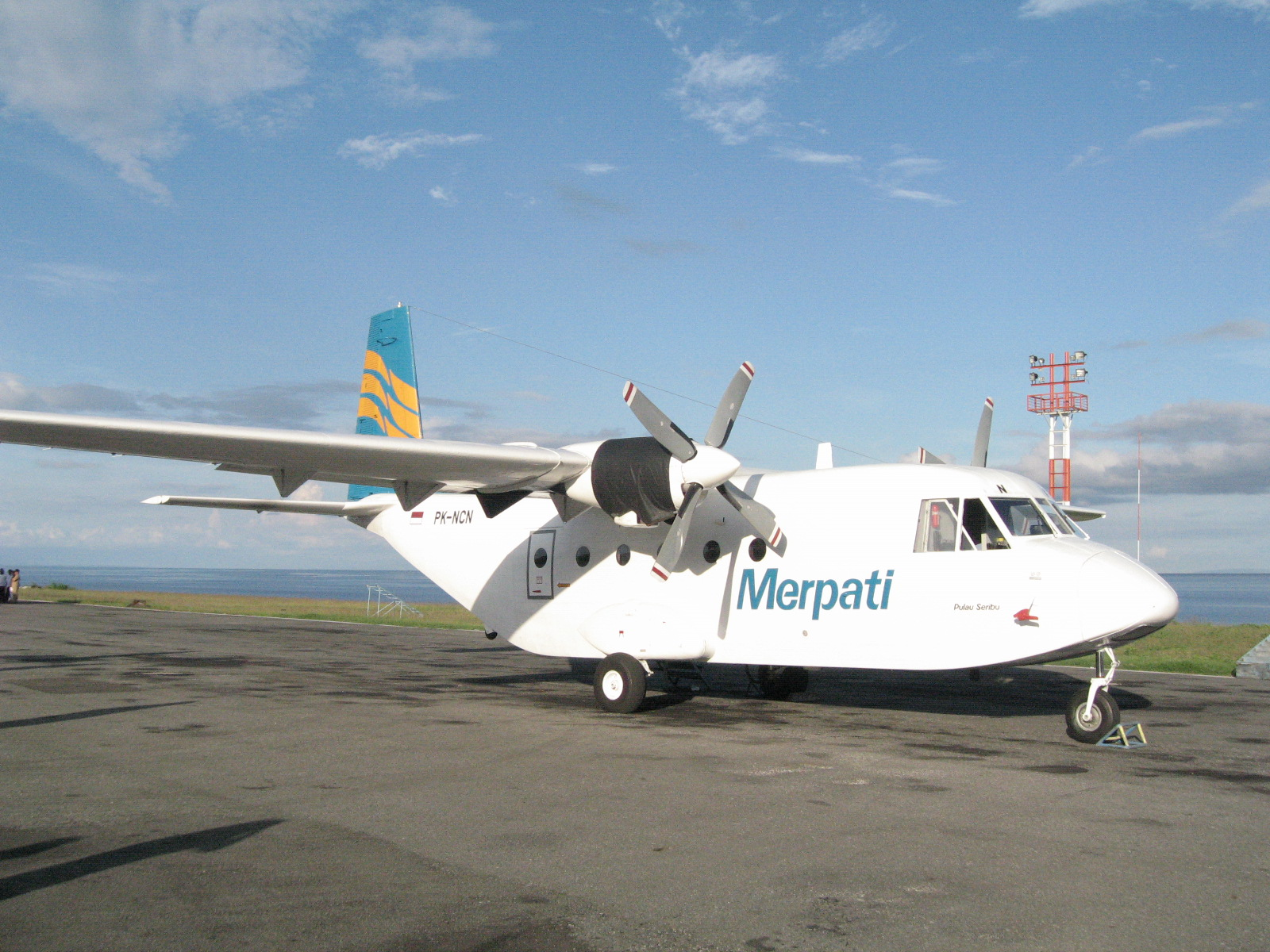
A Merpati CASA C-212

In 1992, the airport's runway was extended to 1,850 m (6,070 ft), to facilitate operations by Boeing 737-200s. As of the mid-1990s, an average of 12 flights per week were being operated into the airport, by Merpati with McDonnell Douglas DC-9s and Boeing 737s, and also by Sempati Air, a private sector Indonesian airline, with Fokker 100s and Boeing 737s. At about that time, another Indonesian airline, Bouraq, also flew into Dili. As of May 1999, however, the only airline serving Dili and Timor-Leste was Merpati, with just three Boeing 737 flights each week, linking Dili with Jakarta via Denpasar/Bali, and with Kupang. The airport was capable of handling passenger and Lockheed C-130 Hercules aircraft, and helicopters, but its apron was rated unsuitable for high-pressure type airframes.

In the aftermath of the referendum on East Timorese independence held on 30 August 1999, systematic violence by paramilitary groups broke out in Dili and elsewhere in East Timor. Early the following month, all flights into Dili were suspended. Under international pressure, the President of Indonesia, B. J. Habibie, announced on 12 September 1999 that Indonesia would withdraw its soldiers from the territory, and allow an Australian-led international peacekeeping force, INTERFET, to enter.

Shortly after dawn on 20 September 1999, the INTERFET Response Force, consisting of members of the Australian Special Air Service Regiment, New Zealand Special Air Service and the British Special Boat Service, began arriving at Dili airport from Darwin in five RAAF and RNZAF C-130Hs, to a "benign" reception by the handful of remaining Indonesian soldiers. Although by then the airport terminal departure lounge had been wrecked, the VIP lounge was one of the few buildings in Dili still intact. The airport was quickly made safe enough to allow C-130Hs from Townsville, Queensland, to land with the 2nd Battalion, Royal Australian Regiment (2 RAR) and two M113 armoured personnel carriers from the 3rd/4th Cavalry Regiment. That day, C-130s flew 33 sorties and transported 1,500 troops to East Timor. A company of Gurkhas from the 2nd Battalion, Royal Gurkha Rifles, arrived in the early hours of 21 September 1999.

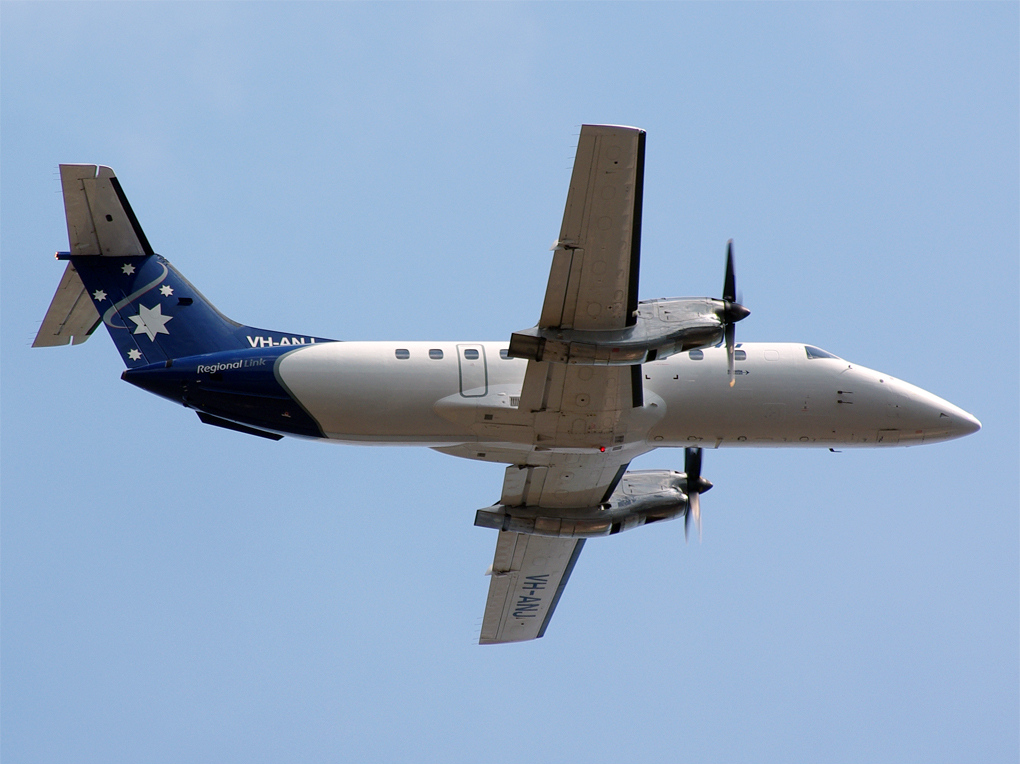
An Airnorth Embraer EMB 120

The following day, 22 September 1999, INTERFET secured the airport. Responsibility for its operation passed to No. 381 Expeditionary Combat Support Squadron RAAF, and No. 2 Airfield Defence Squadron RAAF provided security. In late 1999, Airnorth started operating thrice weekly charter flights between Darwin and Dili.

During the INTERFET operation, the United States Pacific Command (PACOM) and the US Army's Logistics Civil Augmentation Program (LOGCAP) arranged for two Mi-8 and two Mi-26 helicopters to be provided to East Timor together with air and maintenance crews. Operating those helicopters ashore in the upcoming monsoon season required the construction of concrete helipads at Dili airport, and East Timor lacked the facilities to produce the concrete. All the construction equipment required, along with trained operators, was therefore brought in. Between December 1999 and February 2000, the four helicopters flew 475 hours without mishap, carrying 6,400 passengers and 850 tonnes (840 long tons) of cargo.

=== 2000–present ===
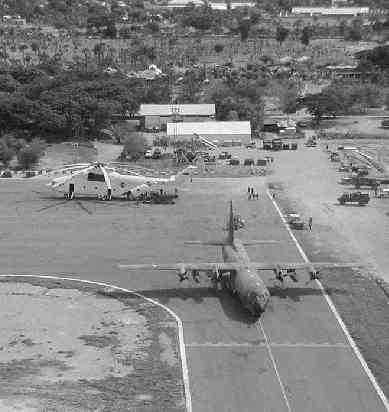
Mil Mi-26 heavy-lift helicopter and Lockheed C-130H Hercules transport at the airport in February 2000

By 2000, the airport had suffered serious damage in general, due to inadequate maintenance followed by the destruction of equipment in 1999 and excessively heavy use in 1999/2000. On 28 February 2000, INTERFET handed over command of military operations to United Nations Transitional Administration in East Timor (UNTAET), which also assumed responsibility for the administration of the territory. UNTAET then began a wide-ranging rehabilitation programme for Timor-Leste's ports and airports, and subsequently a longer-term sustainable development programme.

On 25 January 2000, Airnorth switched to regular commercial services between Darwin and Dili, with eleven return flights a week. Later that year, Merpati resumed flights to Dili from Kupang and Denpasar/Bali, and Qantas subsidiary Airlink began regular flights. By the end of 2000, the airport was again fully operational.

When Timor-Leste became independent in 2002, control of the airport was handed over to the new government of Timor-Leste, and the airport was also renamed, after Nicolau dos Reis Lobato, an East Timorese politician and national hero. In March 2005, Timor-Leste's first post-independence commercial airline, Kakoak, launched its inaugural flight, a twice weekly service from Dili to Kupang. It was operated using a CASA C-212 Aviocar chartered from Merpati.

In May 2006, the airport was temporarily placed under the control of the Australian Defence Force for the purposes of Operation Astute.

Between 2006 and 2018, annual aircraft movements and passenger volume at Dili steadily increased, from about 3,000 and 50,000, respectively, in 2006 to about 8,000 and 275,000, respectively, in 2018. More than 90% of the passenger volume was international movements.

Cargo tonnage at the airport increased from around 280 tons in 2006 to around 400 tons in 2012. From the latter year, however, following the cessation of the UN Integrated Mission in East Timor (UNMIT), and the closure of Merpati's Dili operations, the tonnage dropped to around 250 tons annually through to 2018.

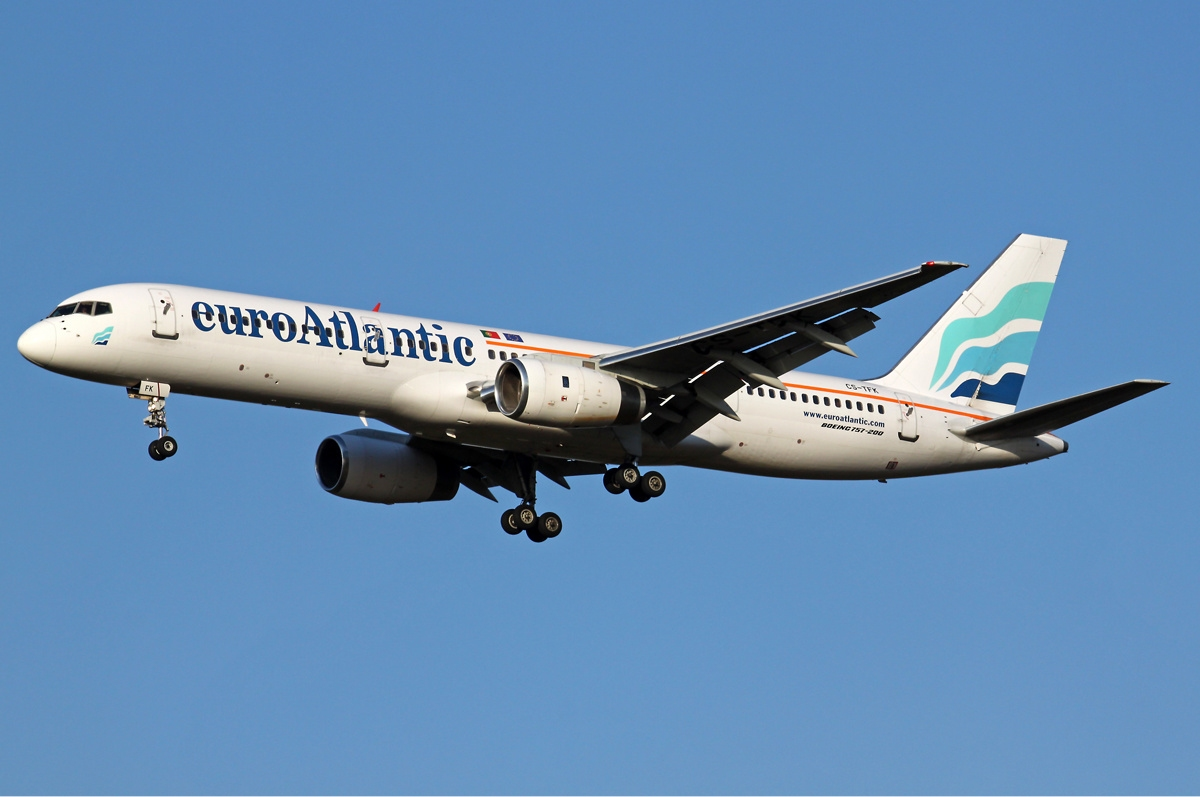
A EuroAtlantic Airways Boeing 757

Dili's airport runway has generally been unable to accommodate aircraft larger than the Airbus A319, Boeing 737-400, Boeing 737-900ER or C-130 Hercules. In January 2008, however, the Portuguese charter airline EuroAtlantic Airways operated a direct flight from Lisbon using a Boeing 757-200, carrying 140 members of the Guarda Nacional Republicana. As of mid 2011, commercial traffic at the airport included a daily and a twice-weekly flight to Denpasar/Bali, a flight to Darwin 5 days per week, and a thrice-weekly flight to Singapore. The airport was also being used by the United Nations, the military, and helicopters servicing the petroleum industry.

During the 2010s, the number of aircraft movements to and from Darwin and Singapore were generally steady, but movements between Dili and Denpasar/Bali greatly increased after 2013.

In 2011, the runway underwent rehabilitation, including by the application of an overlay to upgrade its Pavement Classification Number (PCN), and increase its Landing Distance Available (LDA) from 1,790 m (5,870 ft) to 1,850 m (6,070 ft). However, a 2013 analysis indicated that the restricted length and width of the runway prevented narrow-body aircraft from operating at maximum takeoff weight, and that it had no safe area as required by international standards. Further airside problems were that damage to the perimeter fencing caused a potential risk to aircraft from wildlife strike during takeoff and landing, the main apron had limited capacity and was in poor condition, and an absence of lighting prevented night operation. Additionally, the airport had an inadequate terminal and no separate facility for cargo handling.

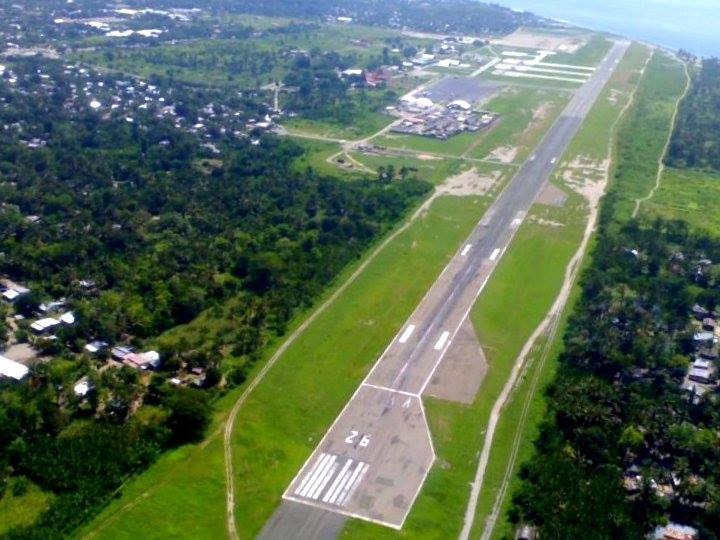
The airport runway in 2015

On 13 December 2016, the airport was flooded for several hours because the drainage system was unable to drain water from Kampung Baru, in Suco Comoro. The following day, the Prime Minister, Rui Maria de Araújo, visited the site and expressed the government's regret for the flooding and consequent disruption to passengers and staff. He also said that the drainage system had been ineffective "due to accumulated waste".

As of late 2019, there were twice daily scheduled small jetliner flights between Dili and Denpasar/Bali, and on weekdays from and to Darwin, with daily Darwin flights on weekends. Scheduled flights between Dili and Singapore had been suspended since March 2019, following the collapse of a codeshare arrangement between Air Timor and SilkAir of Singapore; they resumed on 31 October 2019 under a partnership between Air Timor and Drukair of Bhutan. Smaller aircraft, such as a DHC-6, were operating domestic services to Same, Atauro, Baucau, Fuiloro, Oecusse, and Suai. Helicopters were flying to Bau Undane, where there was an oil field, and a chartered service was being flown between Dili and Denpasar/Bali.

In April 2020, EuroAtlantic Airways operated a COVID-19 repatriation flight between Lisbon and Dili using a Boeing 767-300ER. Similar charter flights were operated in September and December 2020, and in March, July, September and December 2021. During 2022, the company flew and scheduled further charter services, and was said to want to continue to operate, and even reinforce, its Lisbon–Dili connection.

In 2025, it is announced that the Indonesian commuter airline Wings Air will serve international flight to Kupang and was scheduled to operate in March 2026.

== Facilities ==
As of 2016, the airport's facilities included a passenger terminal building divided into three sections (arrival, departure and VIP), one 1,850 m (6,070 ft) runway, and four exit taxiways.

== Future developments ==
The Timor-Leste Strategic Development Plan 2011-2013 proposed an expansion and improvement of the airport. A particular goal was the lengthening of the runway to accept large-size ICAO Code E aircraft such as the Airbus A330. The 2013 analysis of the airport proposed an airport development plan, including:

- the extension and expansion of the runway from 1,850 m × 30 m (6,070 ft × 98 ft) to 2,050 m × 45 m (6,726 ft × 148 ft);
- the preparation of a runway end safety area (RESA) and expansion of the runway strip to 150 m (490 ft) each side;
- an overlay of the apron;
- an upgrade of the lighting system to allow night operations; and
- the construction of a new passenger terminal.

Also in 2013, the International Finance Corporation (IFC) issued a project brief on behalf of the government of Timor-Leste presenting a proposal for the development and operation of the airport under a public–private partnership as a business opportunity. Two years later, in 2015, the IFC revised the proposal, after studying the traffic forecast, possible runway developments, and the landside area, including the terminal building. In particular, the IFC formulated two options for development of the runway.

By contrast, a report on aviation in Timor-Leste published in 2017 by The Asia Foundation noted that the then-current airport facilities at Dili satisfied minimum standards for operating international flights. According to that report, the limited width of the runway was more important than its limited length, because Timor-Leste is very windy, and sidewinds hit aircraft when they are landing. The then-current capacity of the airport's facilities was definitely sufficient for passenger load and demand for at least the next two decades. The airport could already support A320 and B737-500 aircraft which had a capacity of over 100 passengers each, and were within range of all major Asian hub airports. In the event of increased demand, there were cost-effective alterations available to increase passenger capacity.

In 2018, similar comments were made in another report, focusing on the national tourism industry and also published by The Asia Foundation.

The same year, however, the governments of Timor-Leste and Japan began discussions over a planned redevelopment of the airport, including improvements to the passenger terminal, control tower and roadworks. By late 2019, the Japan International Cooperation Agency (JICA), was supporting the plan, and the government of Japan had approved it. In October 2019, the government of Timor-Leste approved a Dili Airport Master Plan presented by IFC, and in October 2021 the two governments signed an exchange of notes confirming a grant of approximately US$44 million from Japan for the construction of a two-storey passenger terminal building of 11,653 m^{2} (125,430 sq ft) based on the projected number of airport passengers as of 2030, and an accompanying power station. The total amount of Japanese assistance for the project, including for additional preparation works, would be more than US$46 million.

Meanwhile, in November 2019 a report commissioned by the Asian Development Bank (ADB) on the upgrading of the runway considered a number of options, and recommended two 2,500 m (8,200 ft) alternatives, involving either an extension to the east, or extensions in both directions. However, the report also noted that the government had already chosen one of the other two options, namely a 2,500 m-long runway involving an extension only to the west, and including reclamation from Ombai Strait.

In September 2021, Timor-Leste took out a US$135 million loan from the ADB to expand the airport. The project funded by the loan was planned to include the extension of the runway from 1,850 m (6,070 ft) to 2,100 m (6,900 ft), and the construction of a new ATC tower, taxiways, aprons, and an aeronautical ground lighting system. In December 2022, the East Timorese and Australian governments signed an agreement under which the latter would provide an A$97.7 million (US$67 million) concessional financing package (in the form of an A$57.1m (US$39.1m) loan and a A$32.7m (US$22.4m) grant) for the redevelopment of the airport. The works to be funded by the package included improved road access to the airport terminal, additional lighting, a new rescue firefighting facility and a new healthcare facility.

As of August 2023, the first stage of the redevelopment project was underway, and expected to be completed in 2024.

On 20 May 2025, a groundbreaking ceremory was held for the airport expansion project which include the new passenger terminal and runway extension and target to be completed in 2028.

On 6 October 2025, the construction of the runway expansion began in three phases:

- The first phase extended the original 1,850-meter runway to 2,100 meters.
- The second phase is a 400-meter extension west toward the sea, reaching 2,500 meters.
- The third phase will add another 500 meters to extend the runway to 3,000 meters.

== Airlines and destinations ==
=== Passenger ===
| Airlines | Destinations |
|---|---|
| Aero Dili | Darwin, Denpasar, Fuzhou, Kuala Lumpur–International, Oecusse, Singapore, Xiamen |
| Airnorth | Darwin |
| Batik Air Malaysia | Kuala Lumpur–International |
| Citilink | Denpasar |
| Mission Aviation Fellowship | Atauro, Baucau, Lospalos, Maliana, Same, Suai, Viqueque |
| QantasLink | Darwin |
| ZEESM | Oecusse |

== Statistics ==
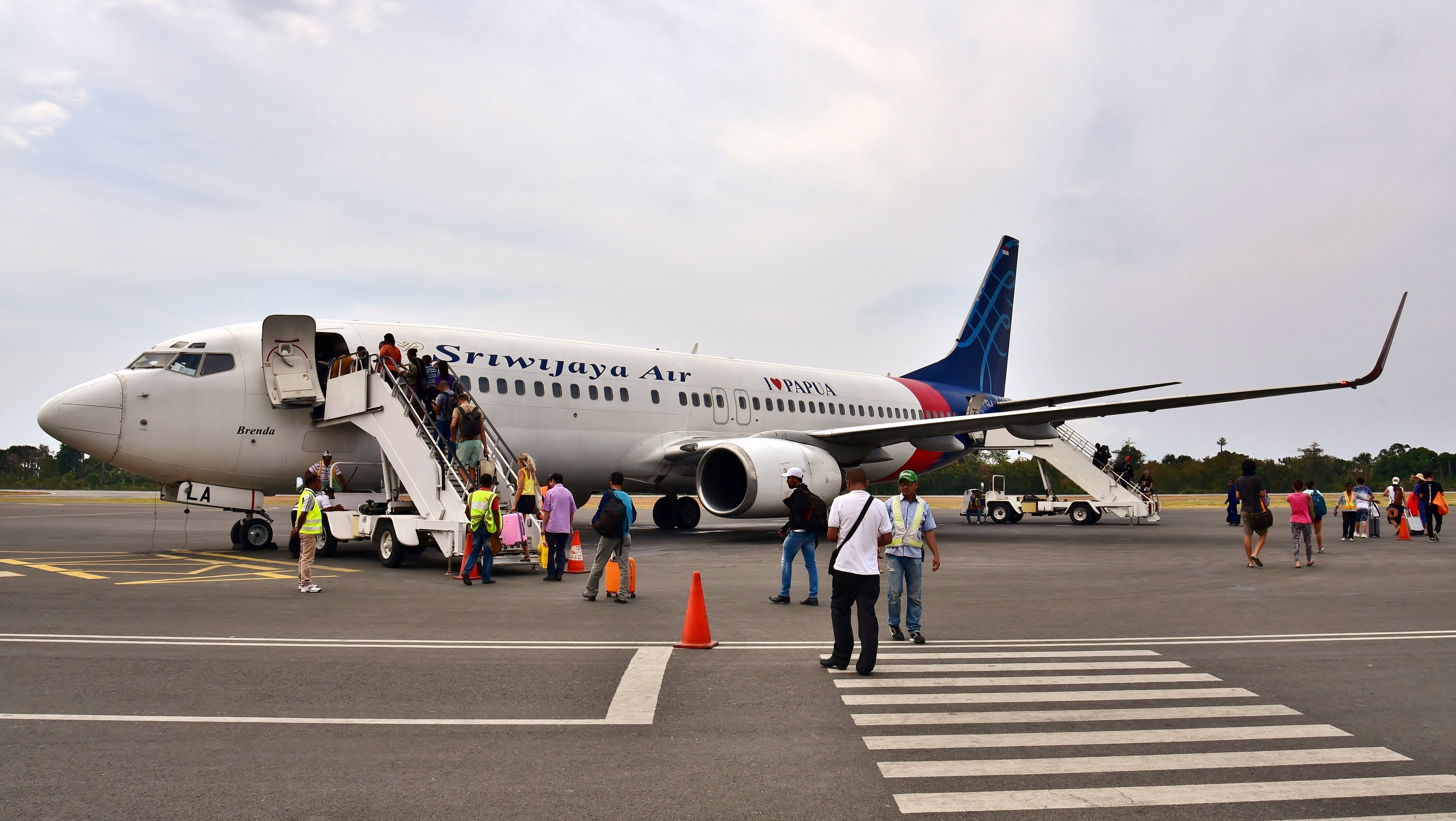
A Sriwijaya Air Boeing 737-800 embarking passengers in 2018

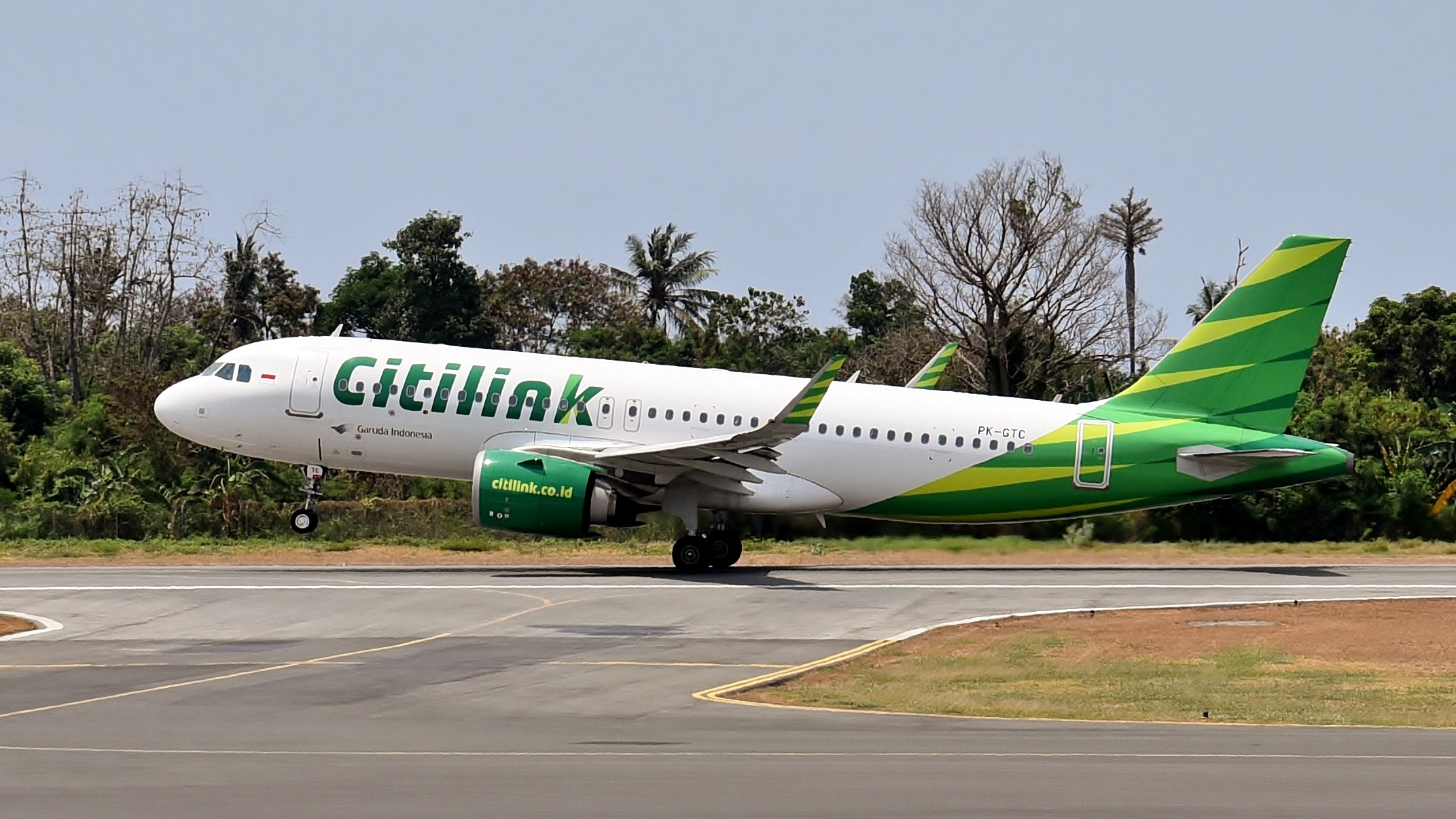
A Citilink Airbus A320neo taking off for Denpasar/Bali in 2018

== Accidents and incidents ==
- On 16 August 1983, Fretilin guerrillas attacked the military section of the airport, killing 18 Indonesian soldiers. In response, and as part of a larger military offensive, Indonesian forces carried out several large massacres: of 200-300 civilians near the town of Viqueque, and at least 500 civilians in villages near Mount Bibileu.

== See also ==
- Civil Aviation Division of Timor-Leste
- List of airports in Timor-Leste
- Transport in Timor-Leste
