= List of airports in Timor =

List of airports in Timor may refer to:

- List of airports in Timor-Leste (formerly East Timor)
- List of airports in Indonesia, which includes West Timor
