= Civil Aviation Division of Timor-Leste =

Civil Aviation Timor-Leste is a government organization, part of the Department of Transport & Communications in the Ministry of Transport and Communications (MTC) to promote the safety, efficiency and regularity of aviation services in Timor Leste. The civil aviation division also has the responsibility for overall planning, implementation and operation of the aviation services in Timor-Leste.

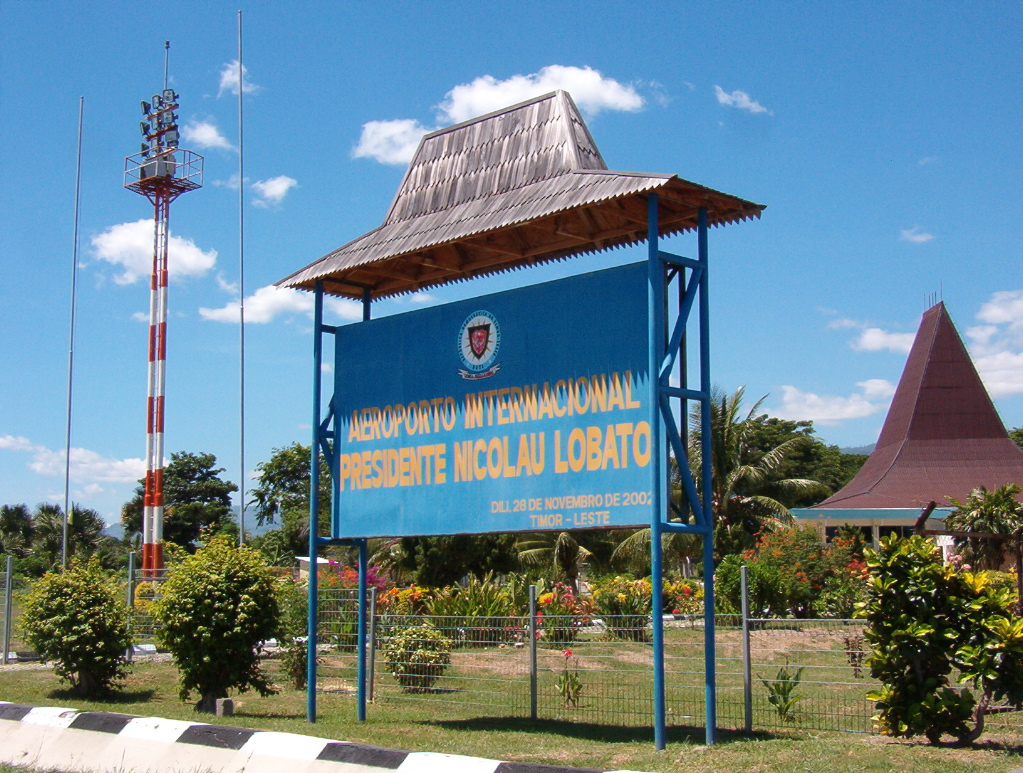
Entrance to Lobato International Airport in Dili, Timor-Leste

The regulation applied by the civil aviation division in Timor-Leste is in accordance with the International Civil Aviation Organization (ICAO) Standard and Recommendation Practices. The head of Civil Aviation Division is a Director who will advise the Minister of Transport, Communication and Public works on all aviation policy matters concerning the international civil aviation including those pertaining of air navigation services in Timor-Leste.

== Domestic operation ==
The Civil Aviation Division provides airport services and air navigation services for Presidente Nicolau Lobato International Airport, complying with international standard service. Some other airports, such as Baucau and Suai, remain as unattended airports. Most of the flights operating into Lobato International Airport on charter flight basis only.

== Foreign operations ==
There is current fortnightly passenger service from Dili to Darwin on Qantas and once a month service from Dili to Kuala Lumpur operated by Air Asia (chartered by Air Timor). Passenger services from Dili to Denpasar have been suspended since early in the pandemic.

Air North is operating regular cargo service from Darwin to Dili.

Prior to the pandemic Drukair operated a regular twice-weekly scheduled service between Singapore and Dili with onward connection to Paro, Bhutan.

There are now three foreign airlines operating into Dili on commercial flight purposes. Citilink and Sriwijaya Air from Indonesia provides daily passenger services between Jakarta, Denpasar and Dili, and Qantas provides passenger services daily to Darwin while Airnorth travels 3 times each week.

== See also ==
- Government of Timor-Leste
- Civil aviation authority
