= List of airlines of Timor-Leste =

This is a list of airlines currently operating in Timor-Leste.

Airline	IATA	ICAO	Callsign	Commenced operations	Image
Aero Dili	8G	DTL	AERODILI	2018	
Air Timor	6C			2008	
ZEESM				2019	

== See also ==
- List of airlines
- List of airports in Timor-Leste
- List of defunct airlines of Timor-Leste
