= Aero Dili =

Flag carrier airline of Timor-Leste

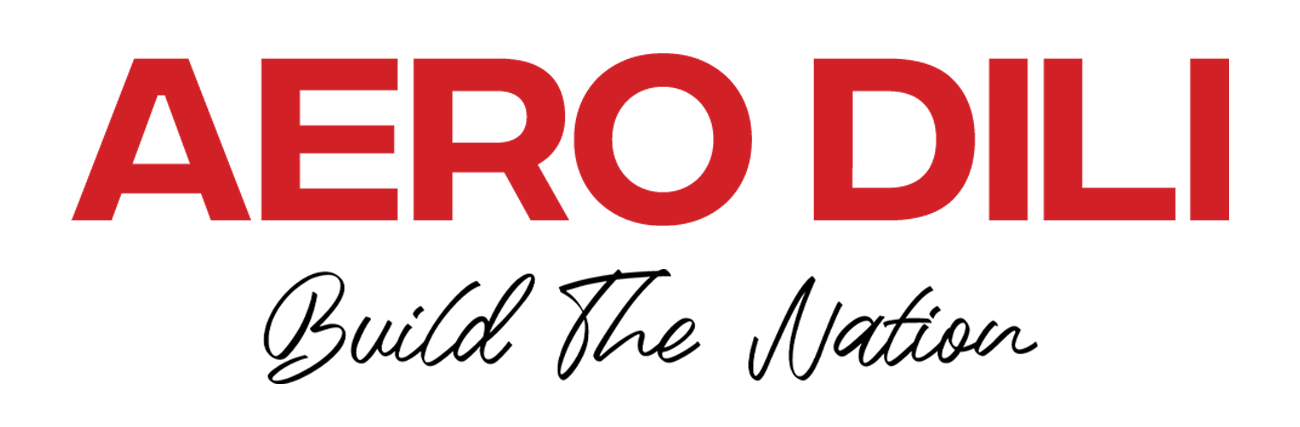

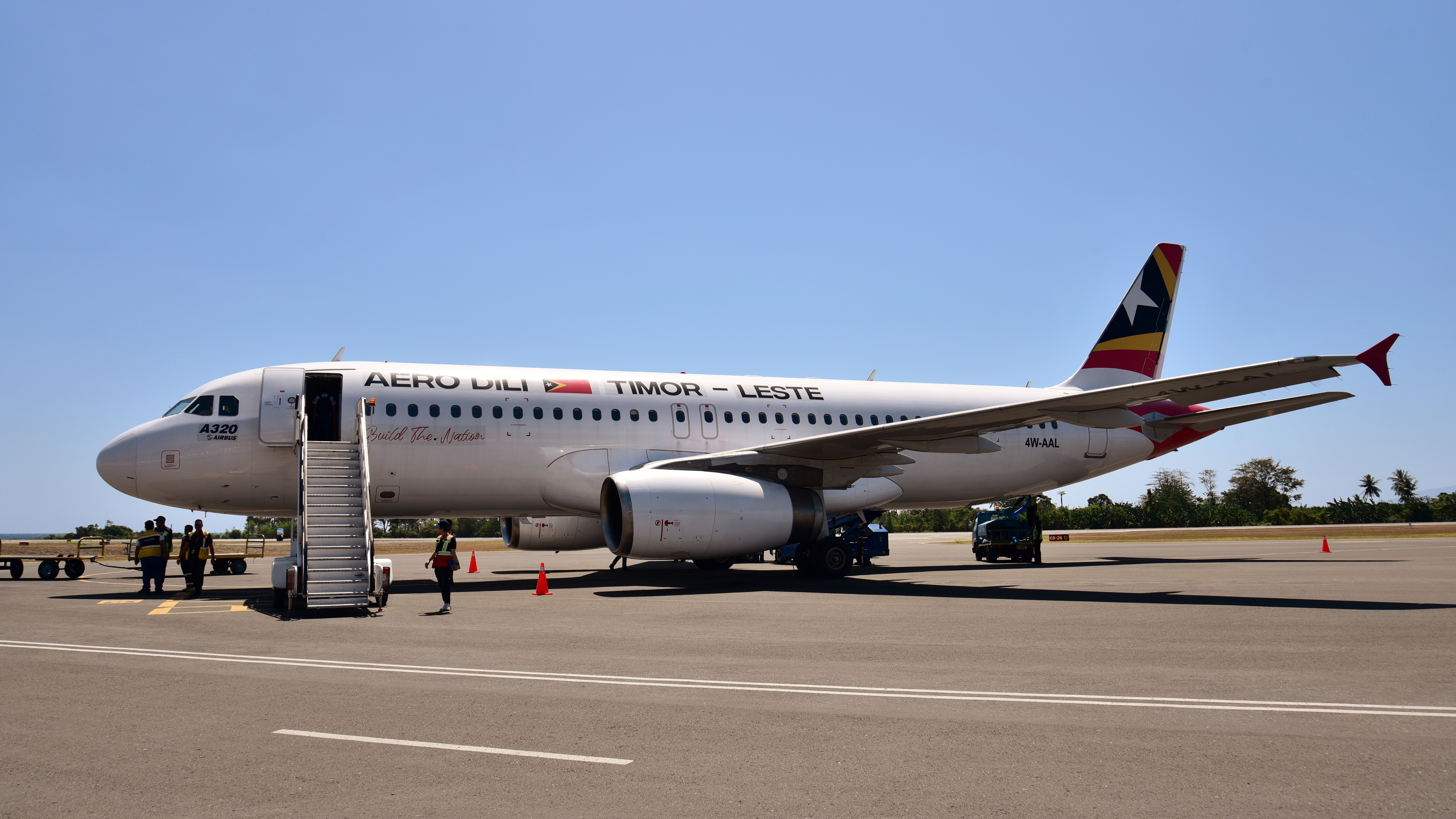
IATA	ICAO	Call sign
8G	DTL	AERO DILI
- Founded: 21 June 2018 (8 years ago)
- Commenced operations: 30 August 2018 (8 years ago)
- Hubs: Presidente Nicolau Lobato International Airport
- Fleet size: 3
- Destinations: 7
- Traded as: Aero Dili Service Transport, Unipessoal, LDA
- Headquarters: Timor Plaza, CBD2, Dili, Timor-Leste
- Key people: Lourenço de Oliveira; Dexter Leopard; Hilman Zaidan
- Employees: <100
- Website: www.aerodili.com

Aero Dili is the national flag carrier airline of Timor-Leste. It has its hub at the Presidente Nicolau Lobato International Airport in Dili, and uses a fleet of three aircraft to operate both domestic and international services.

== History ==
Aero Dili was founded on 21 June 2018 by Lourenço de Oliveira, a native of Atauro. De Oliveira has a background in maritime transport; he has since been the owner of Dili's two casinos, and has made investments in other industries, including aquaculture and agriculture.

Before deciding to invest in Timor-Leste's aviation industry, an initiative he later described as "... a dream come true," the founder had also studied aviation processes in other countries for twenty years.

The airline's first income-earning activity, under a memorandum of understanding with the government made in January 2018, was to acquire and make available to the Timor-Leste Defence Force (F-FDTL) a Cessna 172P aircraft, together with pilots to fly it. The aircraft arrived in Timor-Leste in February 2018, and was put to work patrolling the Timor Sea.

Later that year, Aero Dili was the first airline in Timor-Leste to be granted an air operator's certificate (AOC) to conduct civil domestic services. It commenced civil operations on 30 August 2018.

Initially, the airline operated its civil aviation services using a small fleet of Cessna light aircraft flown by two fully qualified pilots, one of them the country's first-ever female pilot. By January 2019, it was offering six domestic flights daily between Dili and seven other ports.

Later, Aero Dili also provided air services as a virtual international carrier, by chartering aircraft wet leased from Indonesia AirAsia and Sriwijaya Air.

On 11 August 2022, the airline carried out a successful experimental international technical landing, using its Cessna 207 aircraft, at El Tari Airport in Kupang, Indonesia. It was the first ever international flight by a Timor-Leste registered aircraft.

Aero Dili announced, at a press conference held on 9 December 2022, that it intended to start international operations of its own in 2023, using an aircraft leased from Dubai Aerospace Enterprise. A second leased aircraft was to join the fleet after six months, and a third one in two and a half years. These plans represented an investment of US$20 million.

The airline also procured the necessary certificate of registration (COR) and certificate of airworthiness (COA) from the Civil Aviation Authority of Timor-Leste (AACTL) in mid-March 2023.

Aero Dili had negotiated with several leasing companies over the leasing of aircraft. The first two negotiations had not been able to go ahead, because the prospective lessors had been concerned about the weaknesses of Timor-Leste's aviation system and its legislative framework.

The first of Aero Dili's leased aircraft, an Airbus A320 that had previously been operated by another airline, and reconfigured to carry only 162 passengers, arrived in Dili on 20 March 2023. Upon arrival, it became the first commercial jet aircraft to be based in Timor-Leste. It was also the main attraction at an official launch of the airline's international services, featuring speeches by the President of Timor-Leste, José Ramos-Horta, and the country's Minister of Transport and Communications, José Agustinho da Silva, who had been one of the 17 passengers on board the flight.

On 12 May 2023, the A320 operated Aero Dili's first scheduled international flights, between Dili and Denpasar/Bali, Indonesia, and in February 2024 it was used to inaugurate a scheduled service between Dili and Singapore. On 14 February 2025, the same A320 operated a new route to Xiamen, China. The route was scheduled to operate twice per month, and then upgrade to once a week service with effect from May 2025.

In January 2025, Aero Dili took delivery of its first Airbus A319, also second-hand. The A319 arrived in Dili on 21 March 2025. Three days later, on 24 March 2025, it operated its maiden Aero Dili revenue flight, a domestic service from Dili to Oecusse, and then flew a round trip to Denpasar. By late April 2025, it was operating all four of Aero Dili's jet routes, to Oecusse, Denpasar, Singapore, and Xiamen, while the company's A320 was undergoing scheduled maintenance.

As of mid-2025, the airline was also planning to introduce flights to Melbourne and Darwin in Australia. In the first half of 2026 the airline greatly expanded its operations, starting with services to Changle International Airport in Fuzhou, China on 26 January. The airline then inaugurated services to Kuala Lumpur International Airport, the primary international airport of Malaysia’s capital city Kuala Lumpur, on 28 March; and to Darwin International Airport in Darwin on 21 June. However the airline was also forced to curtail its operations due to the ongoing fuel crisis, announcing on 10 April 2026 that it was temporarily suspending the flights to Fuzhou and its more established Singapore services, as well as reducing the frequency of its flights to Xiamen and Kuala Lumpur.

== Corporate affairs ==
The airline's full name is Aero Dili Transport Services S.A. Its Executive Director is Lourenço de Oliveira.

== Destinations ==
Country	City	Airport	Note	Ref
Australia	Darwin	Darwin International Airport		
China	Xiamen	Xiamen Gaoqi International Airport		
China	Fuzhou	Fuzhou Changle International Airport		
Indonesia	Denpasar	Ngurah Rai International Airport		
Malaysia	Kuala Lumpur	Kuala Lumpur International Airport		
Singapore		Changi Airport		
Timor Leste	Dili	Presidente Nicolau Lobato International Airport	Hub	
Timor Leste	Oecusse	Oecusse Airport		

=== Interline agreements ===
- Hahn Air

== Fleet ==
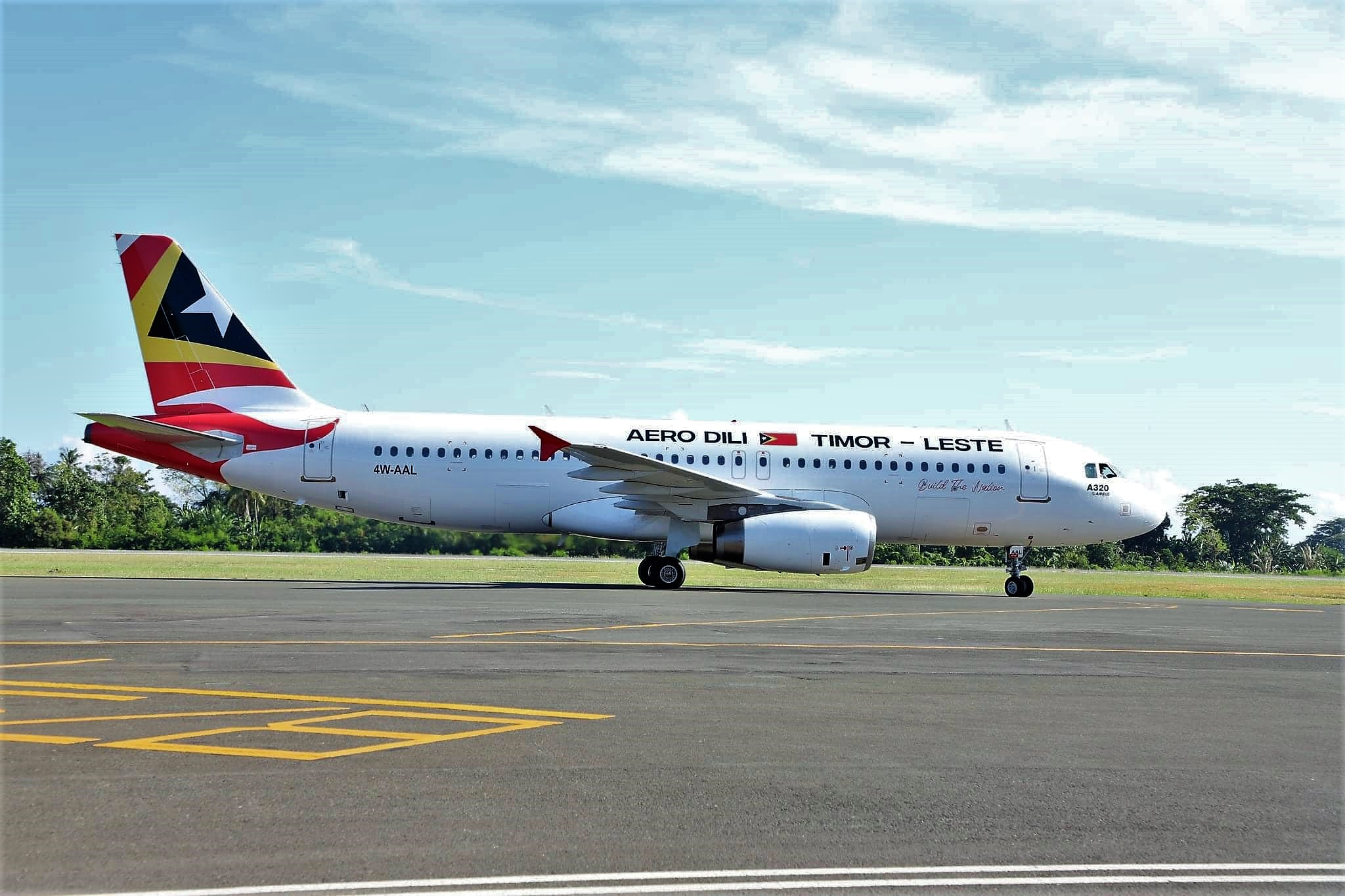
Aero Dili's first Airbus A320 arriving in Dili on 20 March 2023

As of August 2025, Aero Dili operates the following aircraft:

Aero Dili fleet
Aircraft	In service	Orders	Passengers			Notes
Aircraft	In service	Orders	J	Y	Total	Notes
Airbus A319-100	1	—	8	114	122	
Airbus A320-200	1	—	8	150	158	
Cessna 207	1	—	—		7	Charter and domestic routes

== Accidents and incidents ==
On 20 February 2019, an Aero Dili Cessna 172 crashed at Pilila in Liquiçá Municipality while operating a domestic service. The aircraft was damaged beyond repair, but its occupants were not injured.

== See also ==
- List of airlines of Timor-Leste
