= Transportes Aéreos de Timor =

Airline based in Portuguese Timor

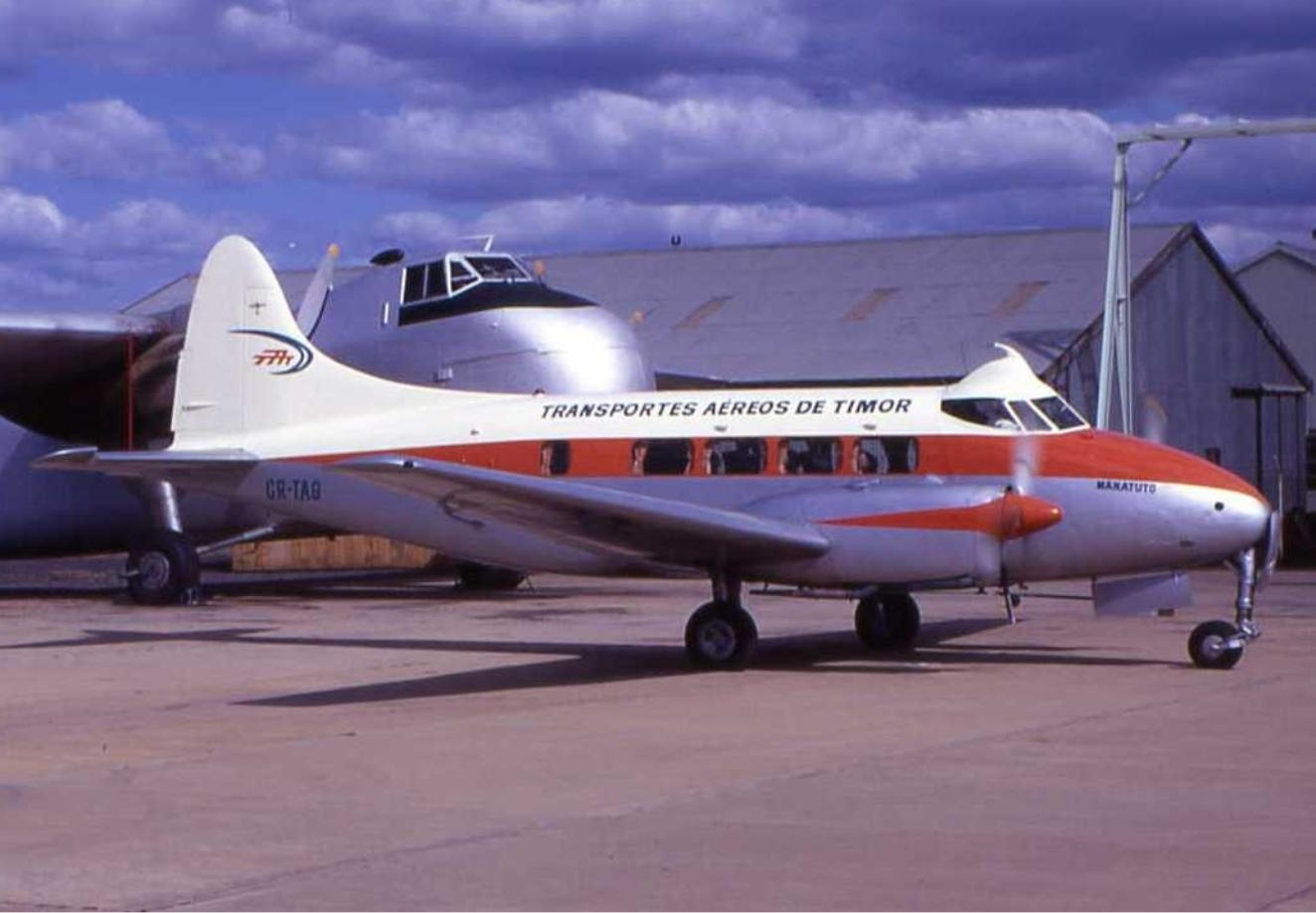
- TAT's de Havilland Dove CR-TAG "Manatuto" at Bankstown Airport, Sydney, early 1970s
- Founded: 1939
- Ceased operations: 1975
- Operating bases: Baucau; Dili
- Destinations: Darwin; Kupang; Domestic destinations
- Headquarters: Dili, Portuguese Timor

Transportes Aéreos de Timor (transl. Air Transportation of Timor) or TAT was an airline of the then colony of Portuguese Timor, headquartered in Dili. It operated between 1939 and 1975.

== History ==
TAT was founded as the colony's national airline in July 1939, several years before Transportes Aéreos Portugueses (transl. Portuguese Air Transportation), the national airline of the motherland. It was headquartered in Dili, and its operating bases were at Dili Airport and Baucau Airport.

TAT served destinations within the colony and the neighbouring countries of Australia and the Dutch East Indies / Indonesia. It carried 15,000 passengers in 1964 and 20,000 in 1974.

== Destinations ==
During 1940, TAT began flying a weekly service between Dili and Kupang, in the then Dutch Timor, using a de Havilland Dragon Rapide wet-leased from Koninklijke Nederlandsch-Indische Luchtvaart Maatschappij (KNILM), the airline of the then Dutch East Indies.

Those services continued, for political reasons, even after April 1941, by which time TAT was six months behind in paying the lease fees and salaries of the pilot and mechanic.

In February 1942, civil aviation operations from Dili Airport were suspended after Japanese forces captured Dili.

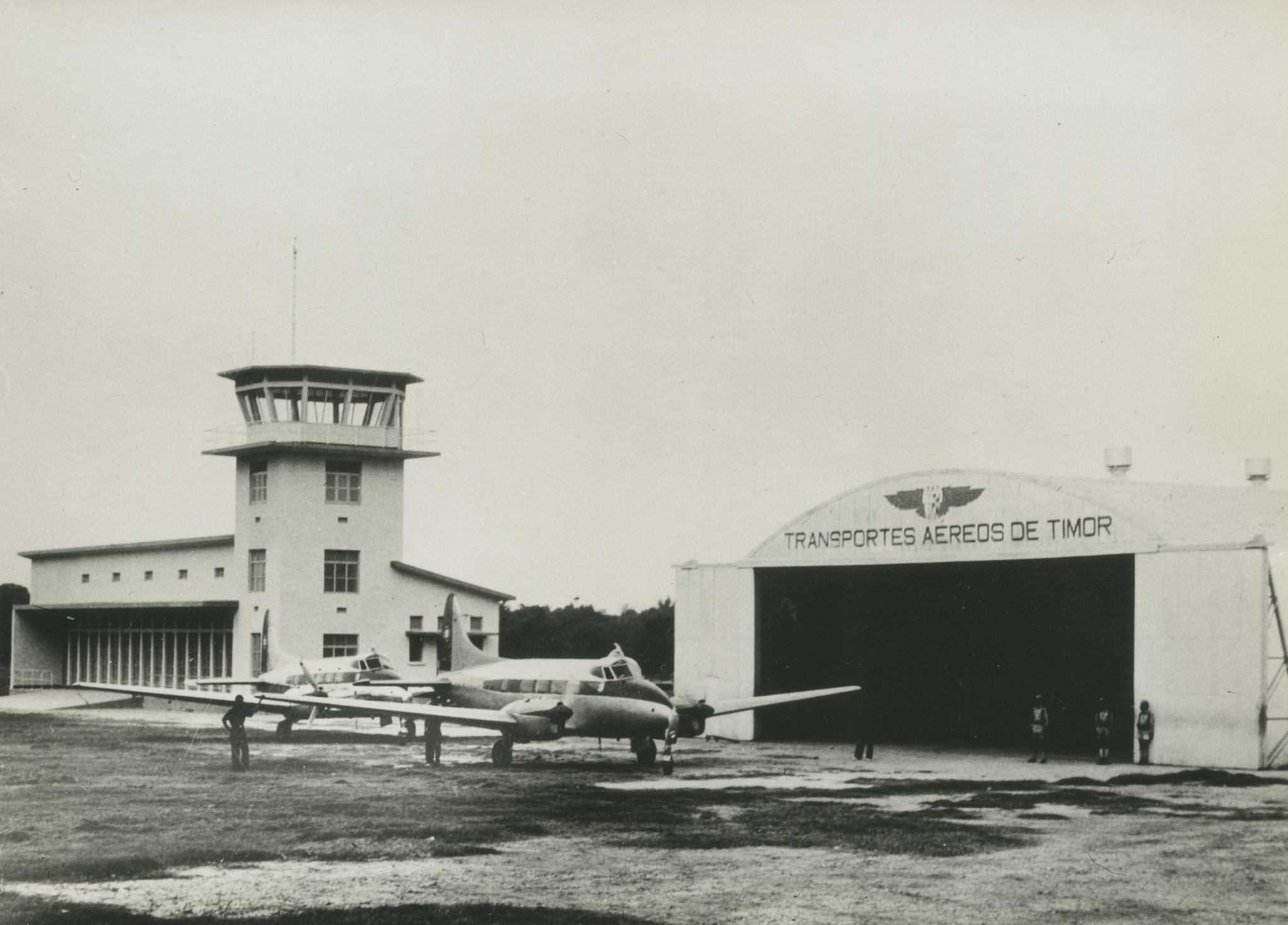
The TAT hangar at Dili Airport during the colonial period

As of 1967, TAT was flying between Baucau and Oecusse, and between Baucau and Darwin, Australia, with two de Havilland Doves. In 1969, TAT was operating flights to six destinations in Portuguese Timor, and once a week a chartered Fokker F27 Friendship of Trans Australia Airlines (TAA) flew the Baucau to Darwin route.

In June 1973, the Indonesian government authorised TAT to start flying biweekly between Dili and Kupang, which by then was in West Timor in independent Indonesia. Later that year, TAT was to have begun operating regular services between Dili and Lisbon, but those flights never materialised.

In 1974 and 1975, TAT was operating scheduled domestic services from Dili to Atauro, Baucau, Maliana, Oecusse and Suai. The Baucau to Darwin services operated by TAA for TAT had become thrice-weekly, and TAT was also serving Kupang from Dili once a week, using a Douglas DC-3 chartered from Merpati Nusantara Airlines.

After Cyclone Tracy devastated Darwin at the end of 1974, the flights between Baucau and Darwin were suspended for a time. They finally came to an end on 7 August 1975, due to the fighting that had broken out in Portuguese Timor.

== Fleet ==
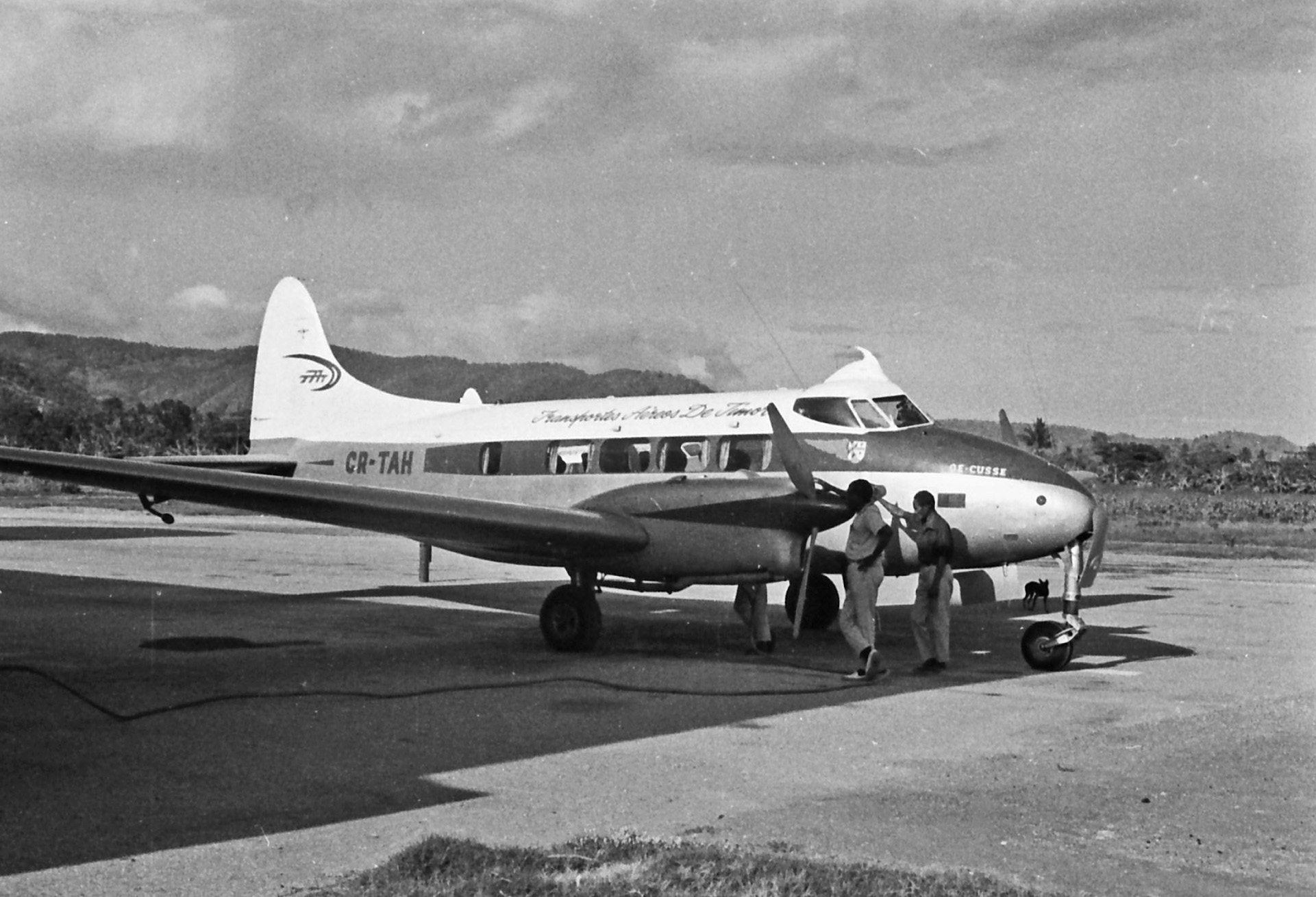
TAT's de Havilland Dove CR-TAH "Oe-Cusse" at Dili airport in 1971

From the mid-1950s to 1975, the backbone of TAT's fleet was a pair of de Havilland Doves, which were small airliners powered by twin piston engines. They regularly visited Australia for scheduled maintenance, initially at Bankstown Airport in Sydney, and in the 1970s at Jandakot Airport in Perth.

The first Dove, Series 1B CR-AGT "Manatuto", was built and registered to TAT in 1952. The second one, Series 2A CR-AHT "OeCusse", also built in 1952, was added to the TAT fleet in 1955. Both were re-registered in 1959: CR-AGT as CR-TAG, and CR-AHT as CR-TAH.

Also in 1959, TAT acquired a de Havilland Heron, which was a development of the Dove with a longer fuselage and four piston engines. A model 2D, it was registered as CR-TAI. In January 1960, it crashed in the Timor Sea; only small items of wreckage were recovered.

As of 1967, TAT's fleet comprised the two Doves. By 1969, three Austers had joined the fleet, but they had gone by 1971. At the time the airline was shut down following the Indonesian invasion of East Timor at the end of 1975, the fleet consisted of the two Doves and a Britten-Norman BN-2 Islander, which had been acquired in late 1974.

One of the Doves, CR-TAG, escaped to Australia in late 1975. According to the Darwin Aviation Museum, which later became owner of the aircraft, CR-TAG was flown by Captain A. Ferreira from Atauro to Darwin on 19 October 1975. Other sources state that CR-TAG's escape was accomplished under the guise of a medevac flight, with Timorese refugees on board. TAT's second Dove, CR-TAH, is presumed to have been destroyed during the Indonesian invasion. The airline's Islander was captured by the Indonesians and later placed into military service.

== Incidents and accidents ==
- On January 26, 1960, TAT's de Havilland Heron, registration CR-TAI, crashed north west of Bathurst Island in the Timor Sea, approximately one hour after taking off from Darwin on a flight to Baucau. Two crew members and seven passengers were killed. The passengers included Dr. Klaus Thorak, a prominent Northern Territory government veterinarian, his wife and their 15-year-old son. It is believed that the pilot had difficulty with poor visibility, for which he had not been trained. In the aftermath of that crash, a number of passengers stranded in Timor by the crash persuaded the pilots, including Harry Purvis, of a new de Havilland Dove on a delivery flight to Australia via Dili to carry them to Darwin, with approval from the Dove's owner, de Havilland Australia.
- According to some sources, at least one of the two Doves in TAT's fleet was reportedly flown in late 1975 as a "bomber" for Timorese militants, who are said to have rolled home-made bombs out the cabin door against either other East Timorese militants, or Indonesian forces engaged in the invasion of East Timor. The reported bombs were allegedly improvised devices made from grenades inserted into beer glasses and taped into place. According to Roger Rudduck, a TAT pilot who was asked to fly the improvised "bombers", a 'half-mad police chief' had previously attempted to install a mortar in the rear of a TAT aircraft, but had abandoned that attempt for safety reasons.

== Aircraft on display ==
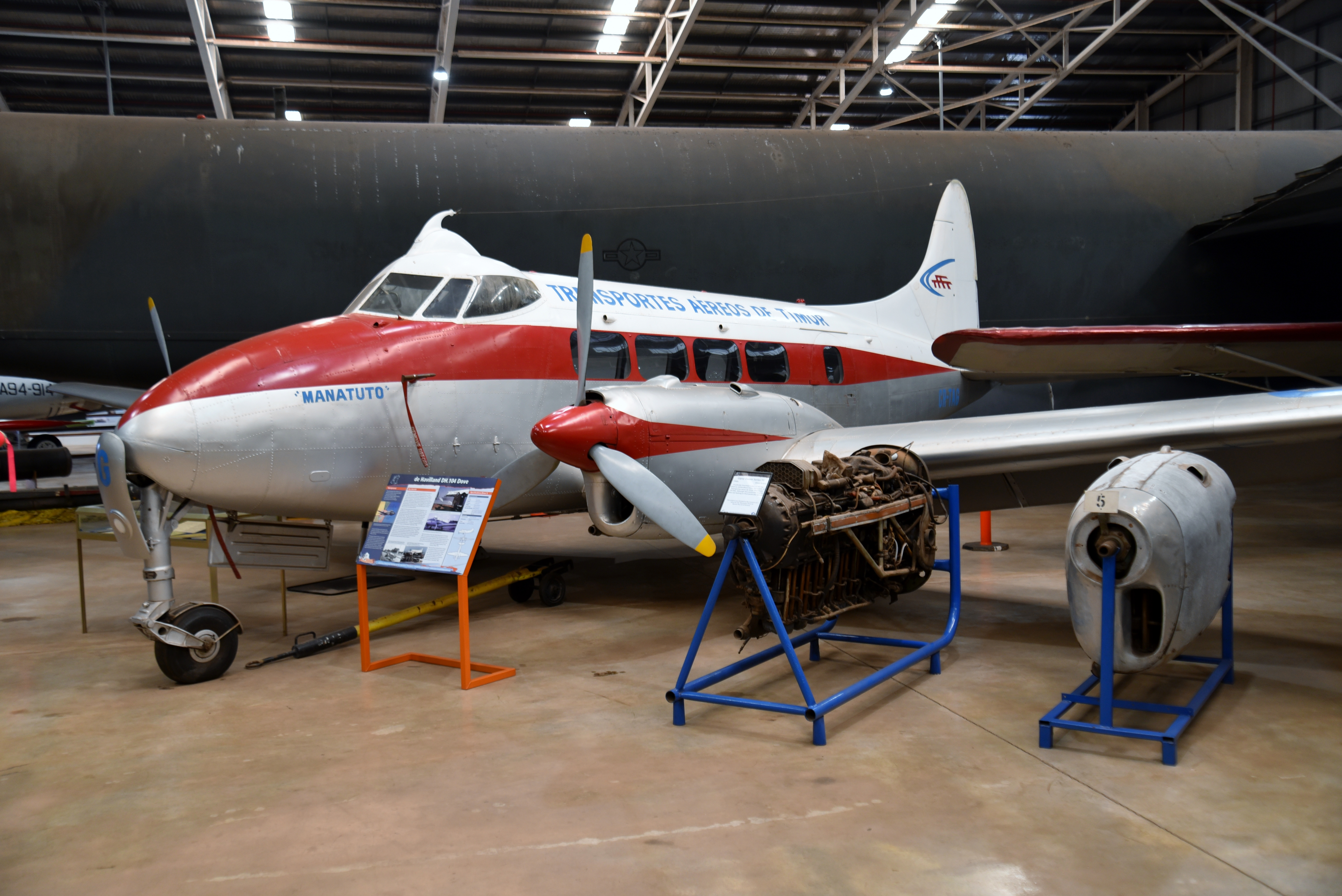
CR-TAG on display at Darwin Aviation Museum in 2023

The former TAT de Havilland Dove CR-TAG "Manatuto", which escaped the Indonesian invasion of East Timor in late 1975, is now on display at the Darwin Aviation Museum.

After being admitted to Australia as an 'aircraft in transit', CR-TAG remained in Darwin and was ultimately declared to be an illegal import by the Australian government and impounded.

Following extensive diplomatic communications between Australia, Portugal and Indonesia, it was donated by the Portuguese government to the museum in January 1978, and formally approved for import four months later. It then underwent a long conservation process prior to being placed on public display in December 1990.
