= Oecusse Airport =

Airport serving Pante Macassar, Oecusse, Timor-Leste

Oecusse Route of the Sandalwood International Airport Aeroporto Internacional Oé-Cusse Ambeno Rota do Sândalo (Portuguese)
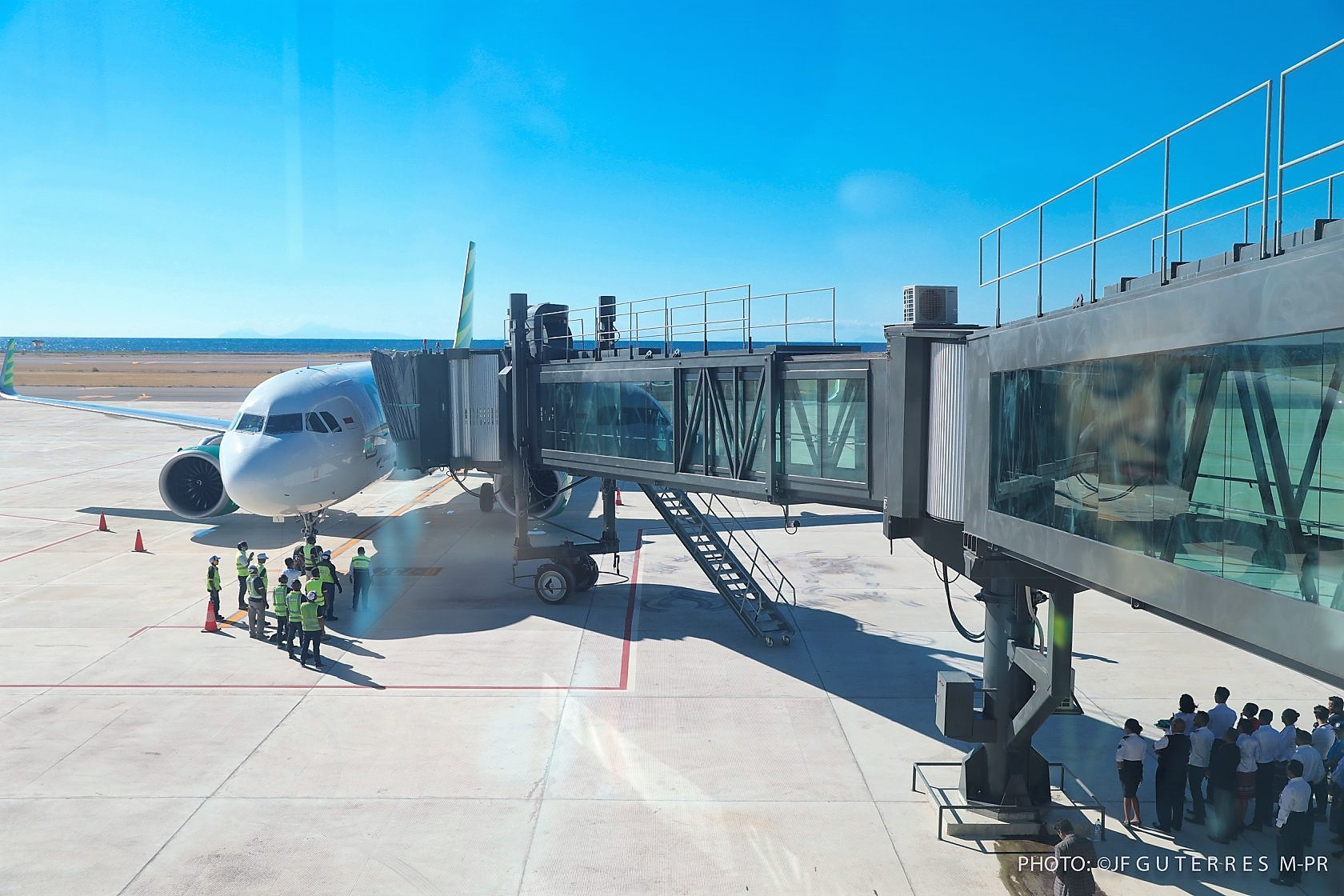
- Jet bridge at the airport
- IATA: OEC; ICAO: WPOC

Summary
- Airport type: Public
- Owner/Operator: Government of Timor-Leste
- Serves: Pante Macassar
- Location: Palaban, Costa, Oecusse, Timor-Leste
- Time zone: TLT (+09:00)
- Elevation AMSL: 0 ft / 0 m
- Coordinates: 09°11′53″S 124°20′41″E

Map
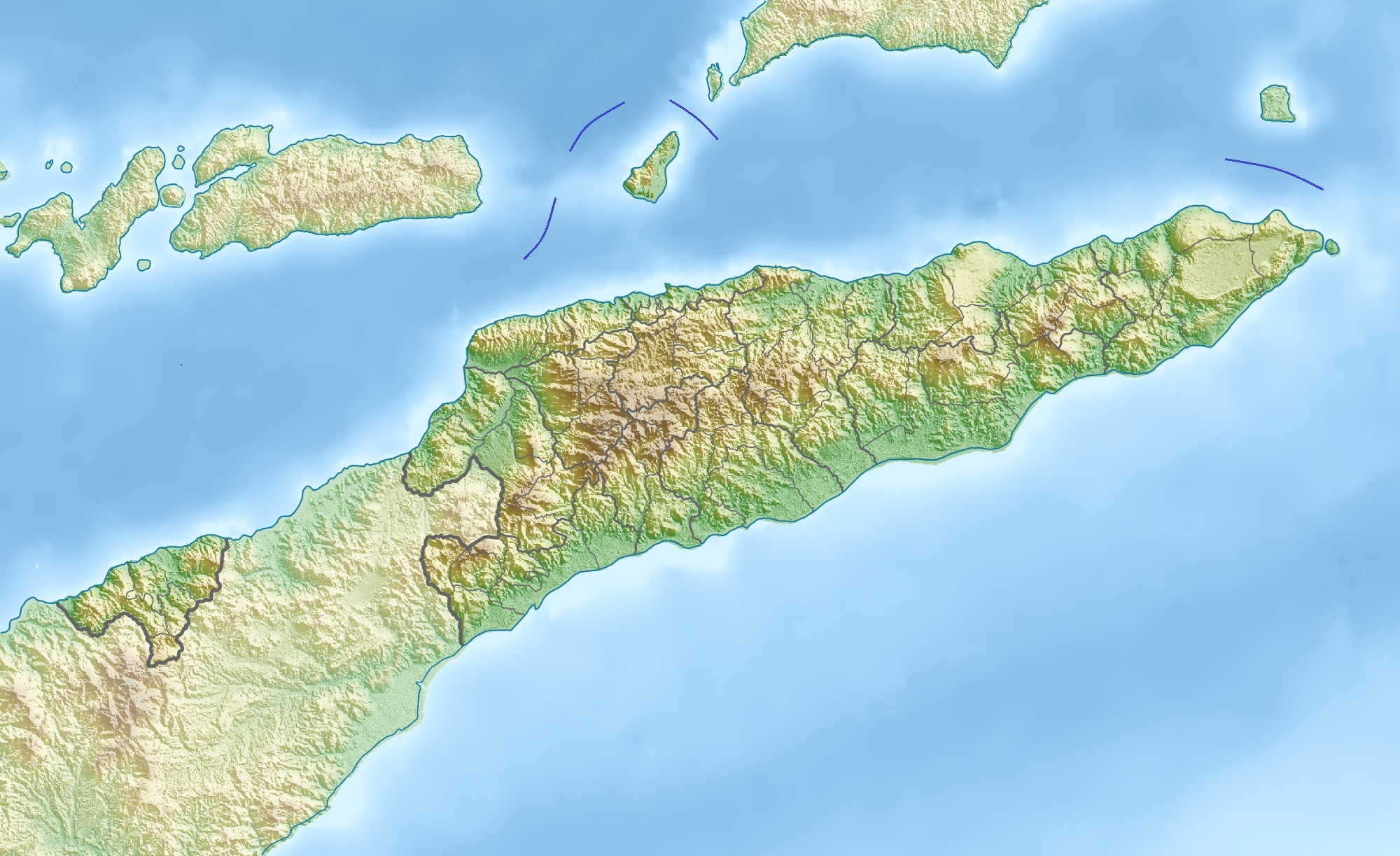
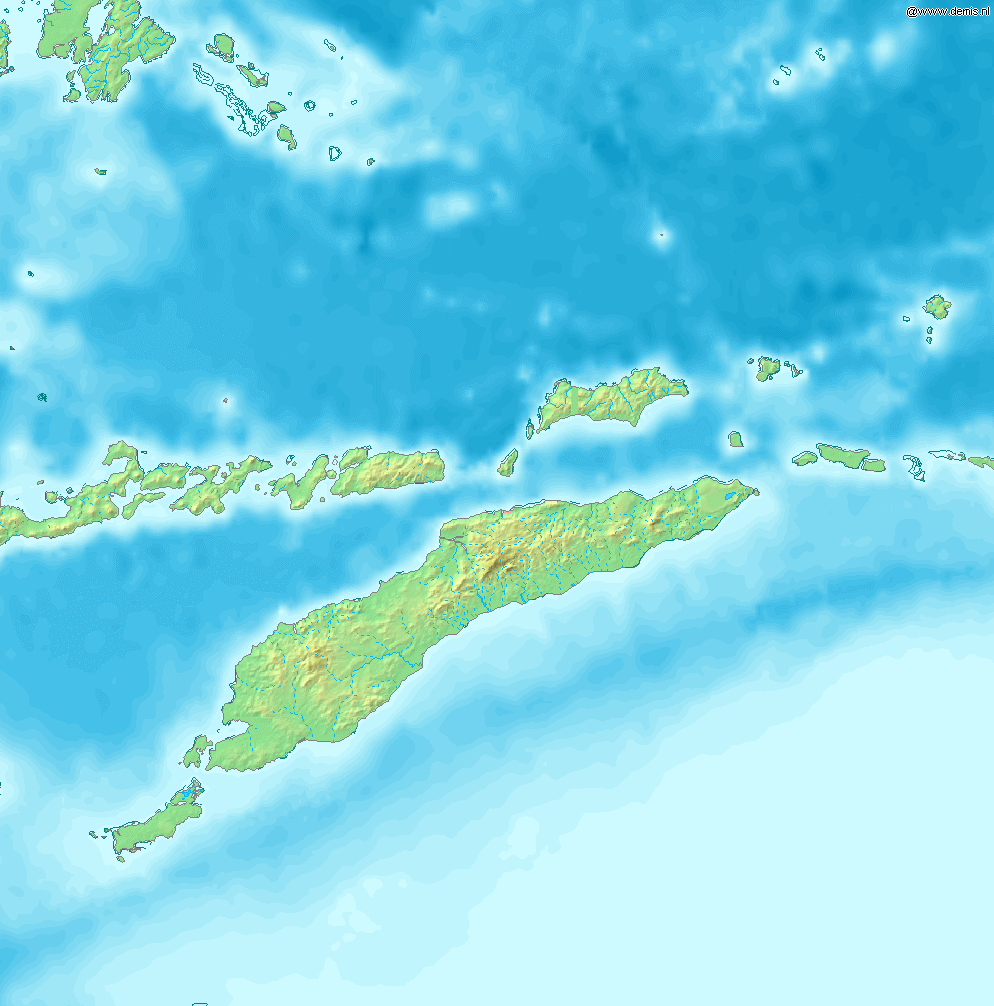
- Location of airport in Timor-Leste Location of airport in Timor#Southeast Asia#Asia

Runways
| Direction | Length | | Surface |
| Direction | ft | m | Surface |
|---|---|---|---|
| 09/27 | 7,218 | 2,200 | Asphalt |
- Sources: WIKA

Oecusse Airport (IATA: OEC, ICAO: WPOC), officially Oecusse Route of the Sandalwood International Airport (Portuguese: Aeroporto Internacional Oé-cusse Ambeno Rota do Sândalo, Tetum: Aeroportu Internasional Oé-Cusse Ambeno Rota do Sândalo), and formerly Palaban Airport, is an international airport serving Pante Macassar, the capital city of the Oecusse Special Administrative Region of Timor-Leste.

== Location ==
The airport is located in the bairo (transl. village) of Palaban, which is on the western edge of Pante Macassar. Palaban lies within the suco of Costa, part of the Pante Macassar administrative post. Immediately to the north of the airport is the Savu Sea; the airport's runway (09/27) is oriented east-west.

== History ==
In 1967, Transportes Aéreos de Timor (TAT), the national airline of the then Portuguese Timor, was operating flights between Baucau and Oecusse, with two de Havilland Doves. In 1974 and 1975, TAT was flying scheduled domestic services from Dili to Oecusse.

As of the mid-1990s, an Indonesian state-owned airline, Merpati Nusantara Airlines, was flying into Oecusse.

Immediately prior to its redevelopment in the 2010s, the airport site was an essentially abandoned and nonfunctional airfield with an unpaved runway. It had no terminal, control tower or any other type of physical structure. As of 2014, its runway was a grass landing strip, 1,100 m (3,600 ft) long and 26 m (85 ft) wide. That year, the government of Timor-Leste planned to carry out a provisional rehabilitation of the airfield site, including the erection of a wire perimeter fence, a clean up and repair of the runway and aviation equipment, and the installation of a provisional control tower and allied facilities.

A report published in 2014 by the authority overseeing the development of a special economic zone in Oecusse recommended the complete overhaul of the airfield. Between 2015 and 2018, a new international airport was built on the airfield site, at a total cost of US$119 million. The contractor for the development project was giant Indonesian state-owned enterprise PT Wijaya Karya (WIKA), and ISQ (Portugal) acted as a project consultant.

The work on the project included the construction or installation of landside and airside facilities such as an air traffic control (ATC) tower, a terminal building, quarantine facilities, a fuel depot, distance measuring equipment (DME), a VHF omnidirectional range (VOR) system, a taxiway and apron, airfield lighting (AFL), and other airport equipment. Additionally, the runway was widened and lengthened, the airport grounds were expanded to facilitate commercial operations, and the radar, navigation and safety systems were upgraded to international airport safety standards. More than 500 Indonesian and East Timorese workers were engaged on the project; most of the construction materials were brought in from Indonesia.

On 18 June 2019, the redeveloped airport was inaugurated by Timor-Leste President Francisco Guterres. Also present at the inauguration ceremony were the president of the Oecusse Special Administrative Region, Mari Alkatiri; the governor of the Indonesian province of East Nusa Tenggara, Viktor Laiskodat; and others.

One of the airport's new jet bridges was used on that occasion, but neither has been used ever since.

The airport is regarded by critics of the Oecusse-Ambeno Special Administrative Region (RAEOA) project as being the most prominent negative symbol of investments in the region, which they consider to be excessive, at least for the time being. In April 2023, the United States Trade and Development Agency (USTDA) announced that it would fund a feasibility study into establishing a scheduled passenger airline to service the Oecusse exclave. The USTDA also stated that it wanted to improve air links within Timor-Leste and boost its international air connectivity.

== Facilities ==
As redeveloped, the airport has a runway of 2,000 m (6,600 ft) in length and 45 m (148 ft) wide, and a parking area with capacity for seven aircraft of various types simultaneously. When in full operation, it is capable of processing more than 500 passengers per hour, and one million passengers per year, between departures and arrivals. It also has automatic emergency power generation systems, modern firefighting equipment and ground support equipment for aircraft support, automatic meteorological information system and a control tower with modern and complete communication systems.

The airport complies with the applicable ICAO and IATA international standards in terms of safety, security and comfort of usage. It was designed to handle unrestricted operation of Airbus A320 or Boeing 737-800 aircraft, day and night. The airport also has facilities for the processing of cargo and live animals, including quarantine services.

== Airline and destination ==
=== Passenger ===
| Airlines | Destinations |
|---|---|
| Aero Dili | Dili |

== Gallery ==
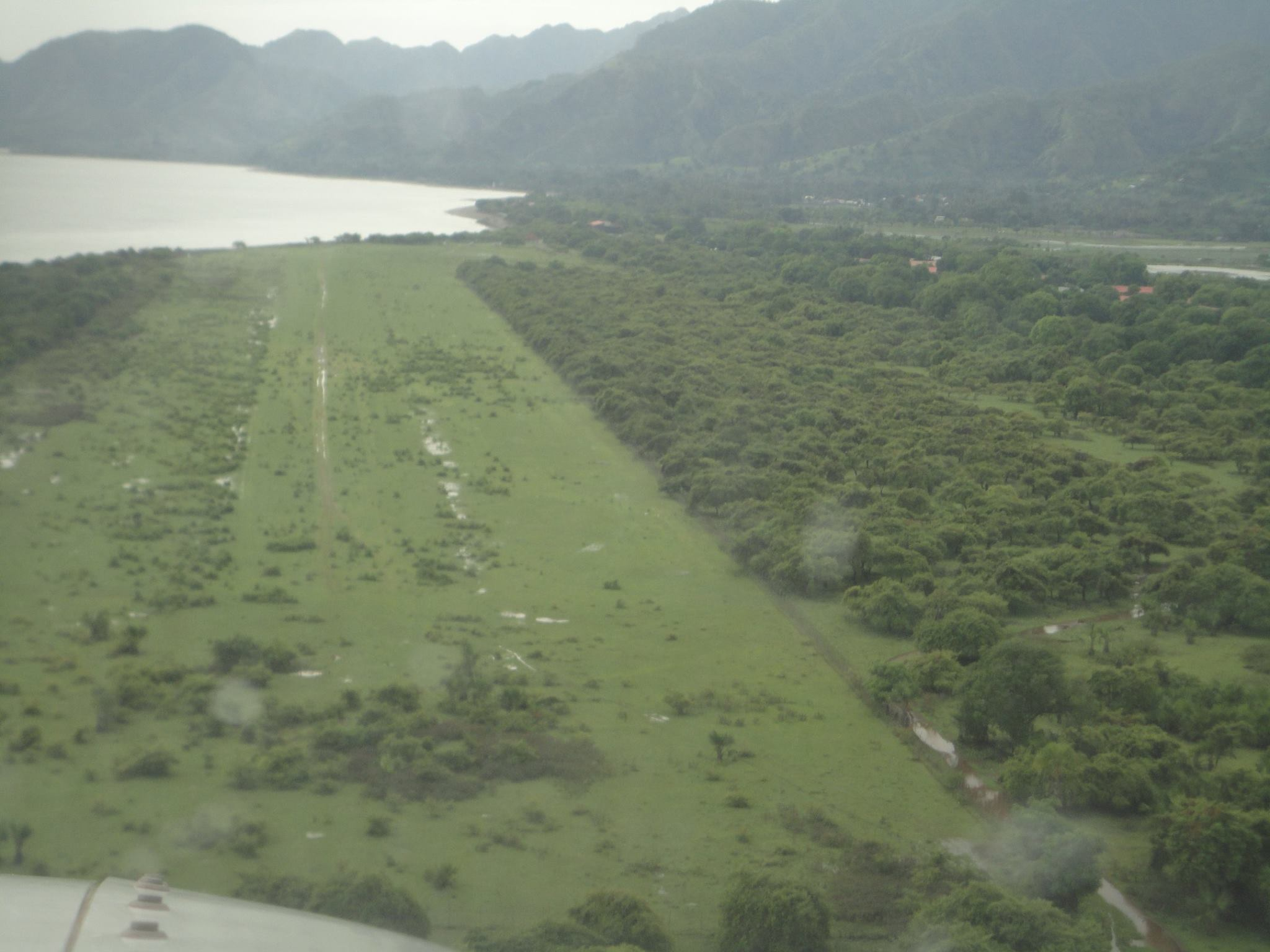
View of the old landing strip in 2014.

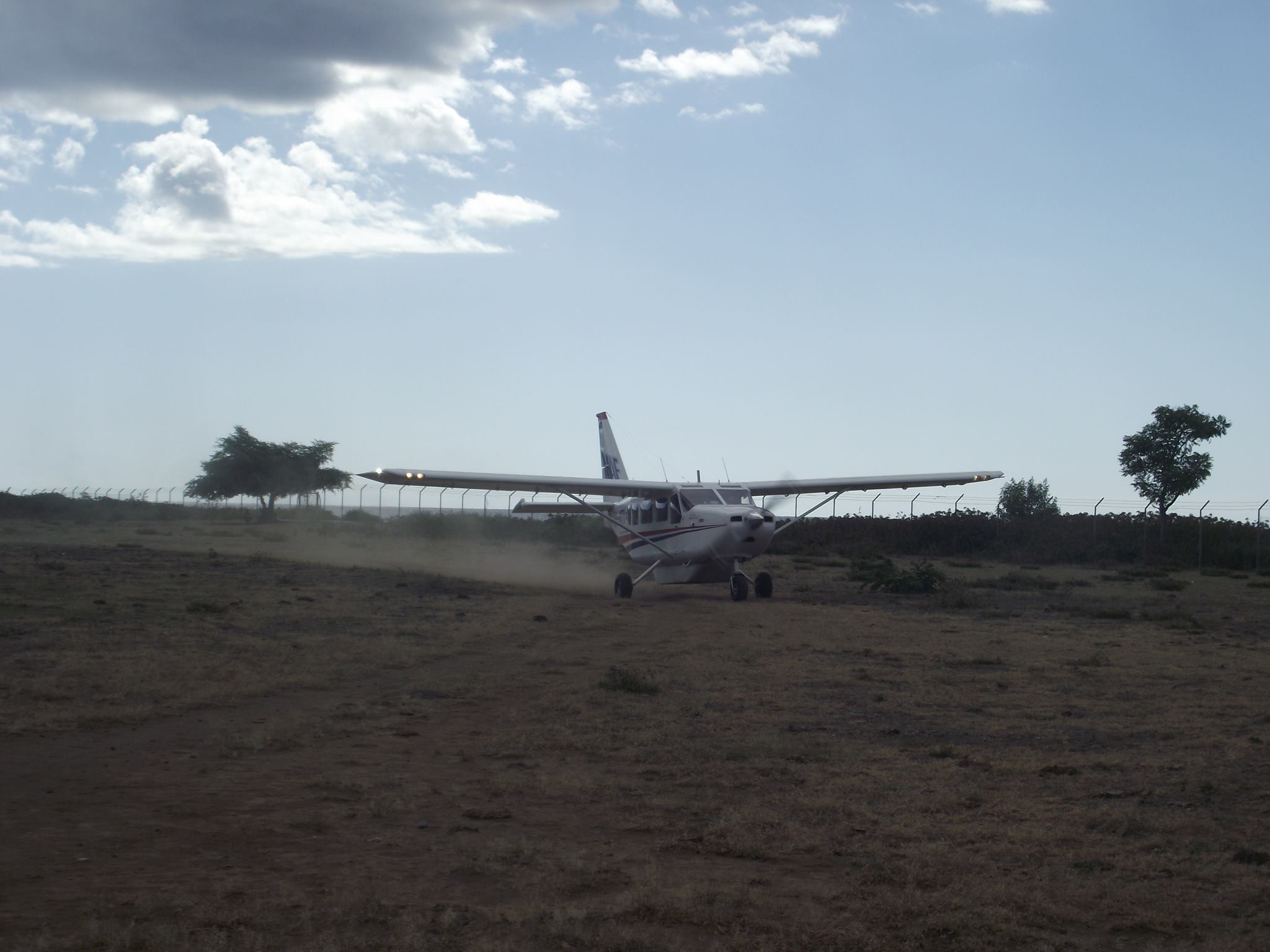
Landing at the old landing strip.

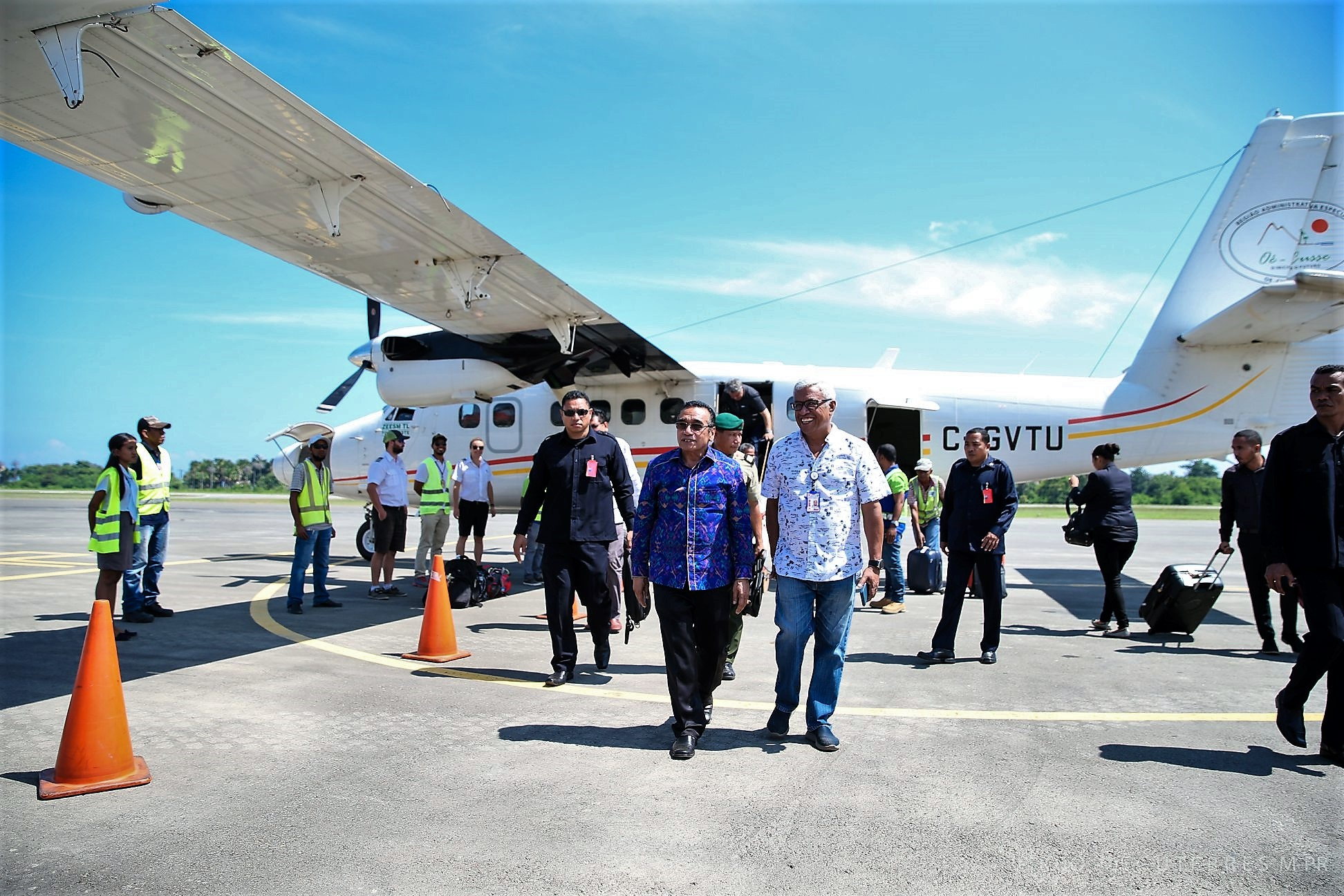
Timor-Leste President Francisco Guterres arriving at the airport for the inauguration ceremony on 18 June 2019.

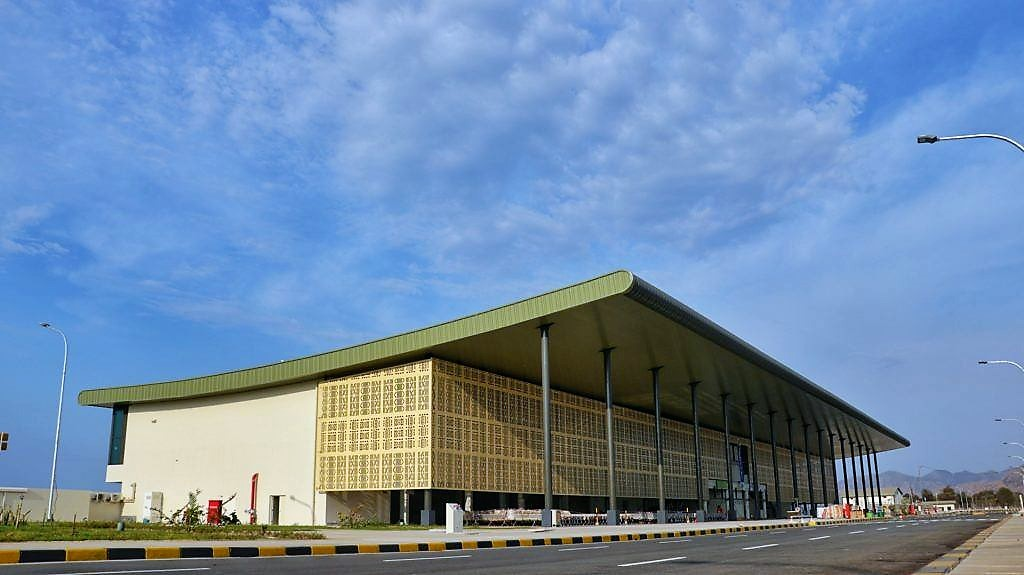
Airport terminal building.

== See also ==
- List of airports in Timor-Leste
- Transport in Timor-Leste
