= Air Timor =

Airline of Timor-Leste

IATA	ICAO	Call sign
6C	—	—
- Founded: 2007
- Ceased operations: 2023
- Hubs: Presidente Nicolau Lobato International Airport
- Focus cities: None
- Fleet size: 2
- Destinations: 3
- Headquarters: Dili, Timor-Leste
- Website: air-timor.tl

Air Timor (Air Timor S.A.) was a travel company based in Dili, Timor-Leste (Timor-Leste). It operates as an airline, and as of October 2019 it provided services from Dili to Kupang under a charter arrangement with TransNusa, and to Singapore under a charter arrangement with Drukair. As of October 2019 it has no aircraft under its own registry. The airline has been said to have a defined strategy to become Timor-Leste’s international and domestic airline.

The airline is registered as a public stock holding company in Timor-Leste and has numerous domestic public investors. The board of directors comprises three Timorese representatives, including the chairman. The head office of Air Timor is located at Dili International Airport, while an administrative and operational office has been established at Changi International Airport.

Air Timor Australia Pty. Ltd. is no longer affiliated with the Singaporean and Timorese companies since breaking off in 2017. The Australian company also holds an Australian AOC (air operator's certificate) issued by CASA (the Australian Civil Aviation Authority).

== History ==
Prior to operating in Timor-Leste, Air Timor first commenced its corporate life as charter airline under the name Austasia Airlines, operating charters between Australia and Indonesia from 2001 until 2007. In 2007 it relocated to Timor-Leste, and Austasia Airlines was registered there as well as in Singapore. Following approval from the Timorese Government, Austasia Airlines commenced its first scheduled charter flights from Singapore to Dili in August 2008, operating a twice weekly schedule on Tuesday and Saturday with an Airbus A319 aircraft wet-leased from SilkAir.

In 2010 Austasia Airlines lodged its application to become a national company and change its name to Air Timor S. A., which was approved by the Timor-Leste government.

In October 2014 the airline commenced operations from Bali, Indonesia direct to Dili, under another charter operation.

On March 30, 2019, Air Timor made their last flight from Dili (DIL) to Singapore (SIN). On June 14, 2019, Air Timor resumed its Dili to Kupang flights, a joint service with Transnusa. Currently it operates a thrice weekly flight to Kupang using the ATR 72-600.

On October 17, 2019, Air Timor announced the resumption of the Dili-Singapore route starting October 31, 2019, on an Airbus A319 operated by Drukair. The route will be flown twice weekly, on Thursdays and Sundays.

== Destinations ==
Country	City	Airport	Notes	Refs
Timor-Leste	Dili	Presidente Nicolau Lobato International Airport	Hub	
Indonesia	Kupang	El Tari International Airport		
Singapore	Singapore	Changi Airport		

== Fleet ==
Air Timor does not currently operate nor own any aircraft under its own registry.

Air Timor fleet
Aircraft	In service	Orders	Passengers			Notes
Aircraft	In service	Orders	J	Y	Total	Notes
Airbus A319-100	1	—	16	102	118	Wet-leased from Drukair.
ATR 72-600	1	—	—	72	72	Wet-leased from TransNusa.
Total	2	0

== See also ==
- List of airlines of Timor-Leste
