= List of airports in Timor-Leste =

This is a list of airports in Timor-Leste (former East Timor), sorted by location.

== Airports ==
Airport names shown in bold indicate the airport has scheduled service on commercial airlines.

City served	ICAO	IATA	Airport name
Atauro	WPAT	AUT	Atauro Airport
Baucau	WPEC	BCH	Baucau Airport
Dili	WPDL	DIL	**Presidente Nicolau Lobato International Airport**
Lospalos	WPFL		Fuiloro Airport, Fuiloro
Maliana	WPMN	MPT	Maliana Airport
Pante Macassar	WPOC	OEC	**Oecusse Airport**
Suai	WPDB	UAI	Suai Airport
Viqueque	WPVQ	VIQ	Viqueque Airport

== See also ==
- Transport in Timor-Leste
- List of airports by ICAO code: W#WP - Timor-Leste
- Wikipedia:WikiProject Aviation/Airline destination lists: Asia#Timor-Leste
- List of airports in Indonesia which covers West Timor
