= Suai Airport =

Airport in Suai, Timor-Leste

Suai Airport Commander in Chief of FALINTIL, Kay Rala Xanana Gusmão, International Airport Aeroporto Internacional Comandante-Chefe das FALINTIL, Kay Rala Xanana Gusmão (Portuguese)
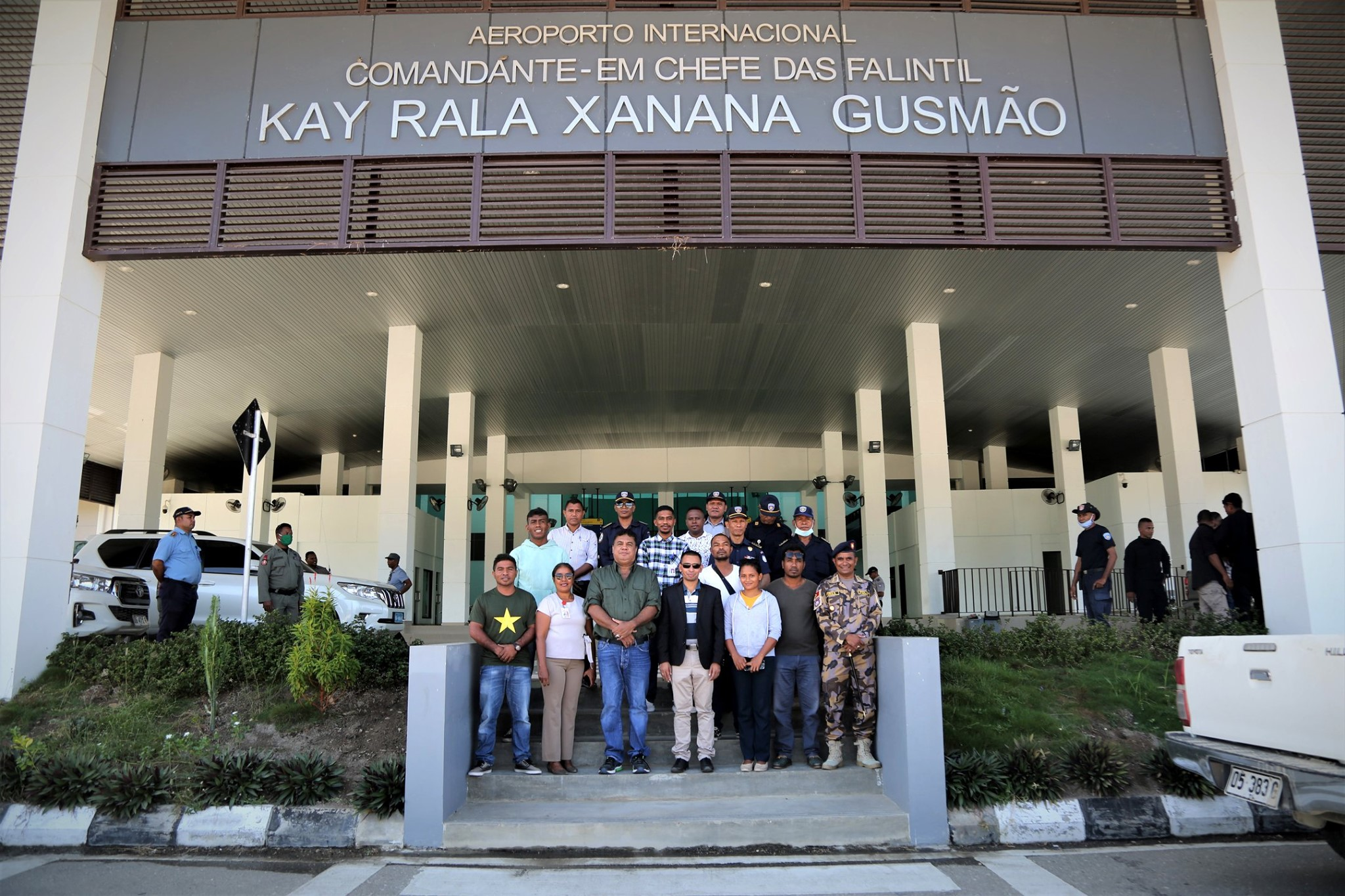
- IATA: UAI; ICAO: WPDB

Summary
- Airport type: Public
- Owner/Operator: Government of Timor-Leste
- Serves: Suai, Cova Lima, Timor-Leste
- Location: Labarai, Suai
- Time zone: TLT (+09:00)
- Elevation AMSL: 96 ft / 29 m
- Coordinates: 09°18′14″S 125°17′13″E

Map
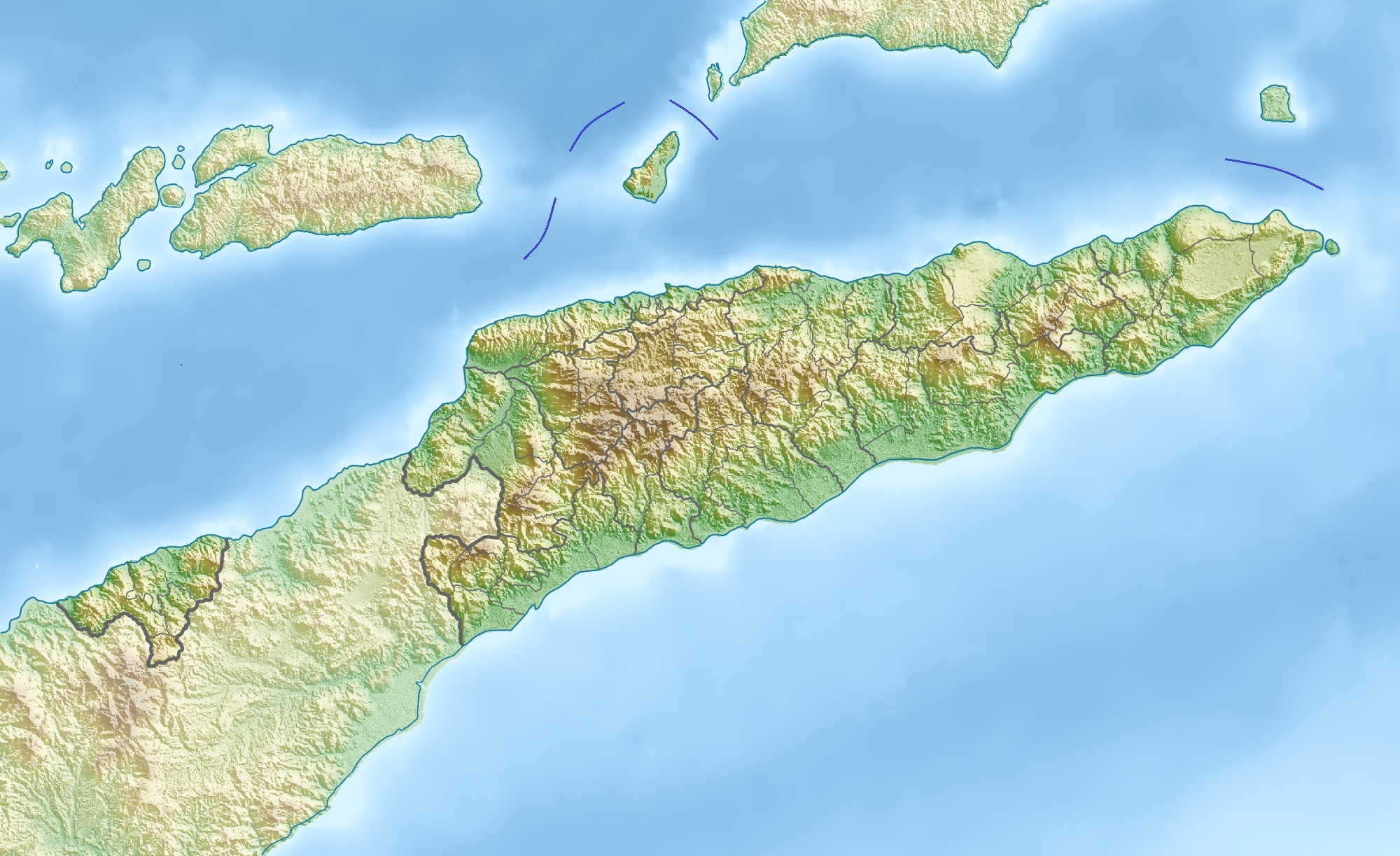
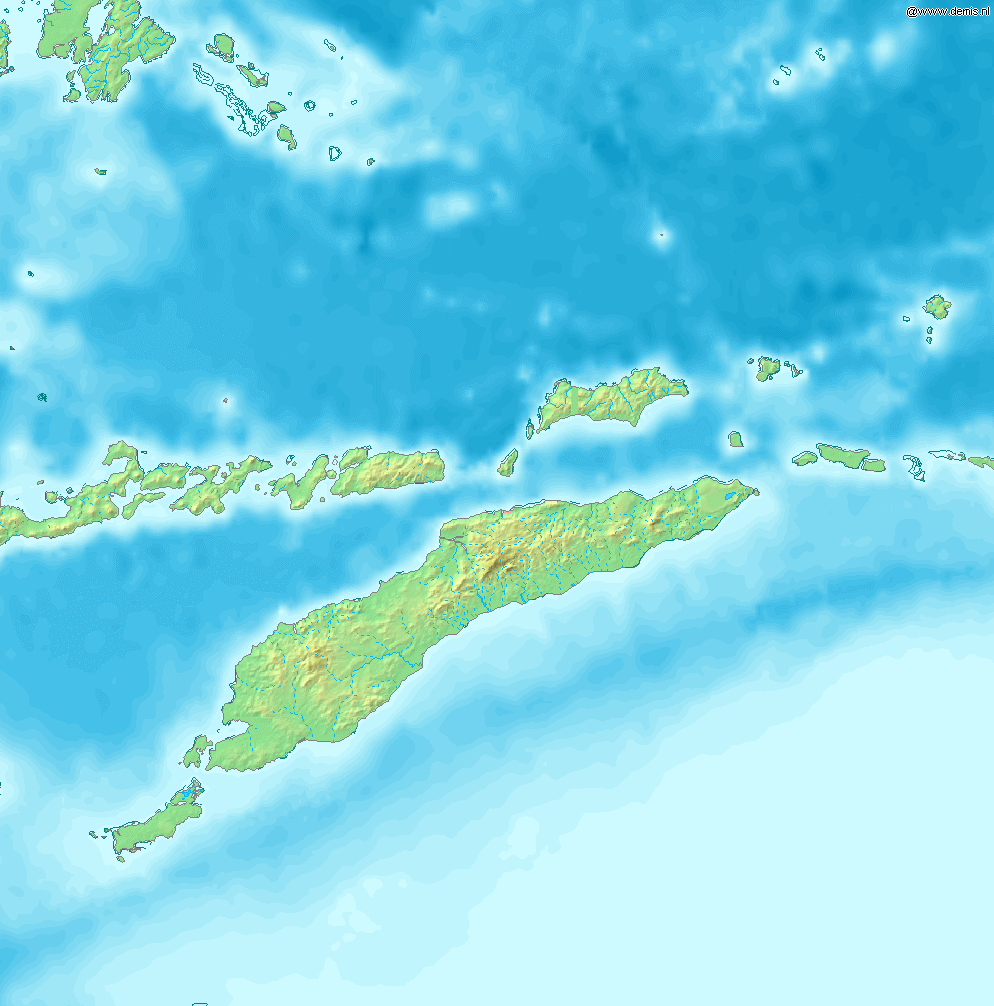
- Location of airport in Timor-Leste Location of airport in Timor

Runways
| Direction | Length | | Surface |
| Direction | m | ft | Surface |
|---|---|---|---|
| 16/34 | 1,500 | 4,921 | Asphalt |
- Sources: AIP Timor-Leste,DAFIF,WFP

Suai Airport (IATA: UAI, ICAO: WPDB), officially Commander in Chief of FALINTIL, Kay Rala Xanana Gusmão, International Airport (Portuguese: Aeroporto Internacional Comandante-Chefe das FALINTIL, Kay Rala Xanana Gusmão, Tetum: Aeroportu Internasionál Komandante Xefe FALINTIL, Kay Rala Xanana Gusmão), and also known as Covalima Airport, is an airport serving Suai, in Cova Lima Municipality, Timor-Leste.

== Location ==
The airport is located 4 km (2.5 mi) east of Suai, in the southwestern corner of the suco of Labarai, which is part of the Suai administrative post. The airport's runway (16/34) is oriented broadly north–south.

== History ==
As of 1974 and 1975, Transportes Aéreos de Timor (TAT), the national airline of the then Portuguese Timor, was operating scheduled domestic services from Dili to Covalima/Suai.

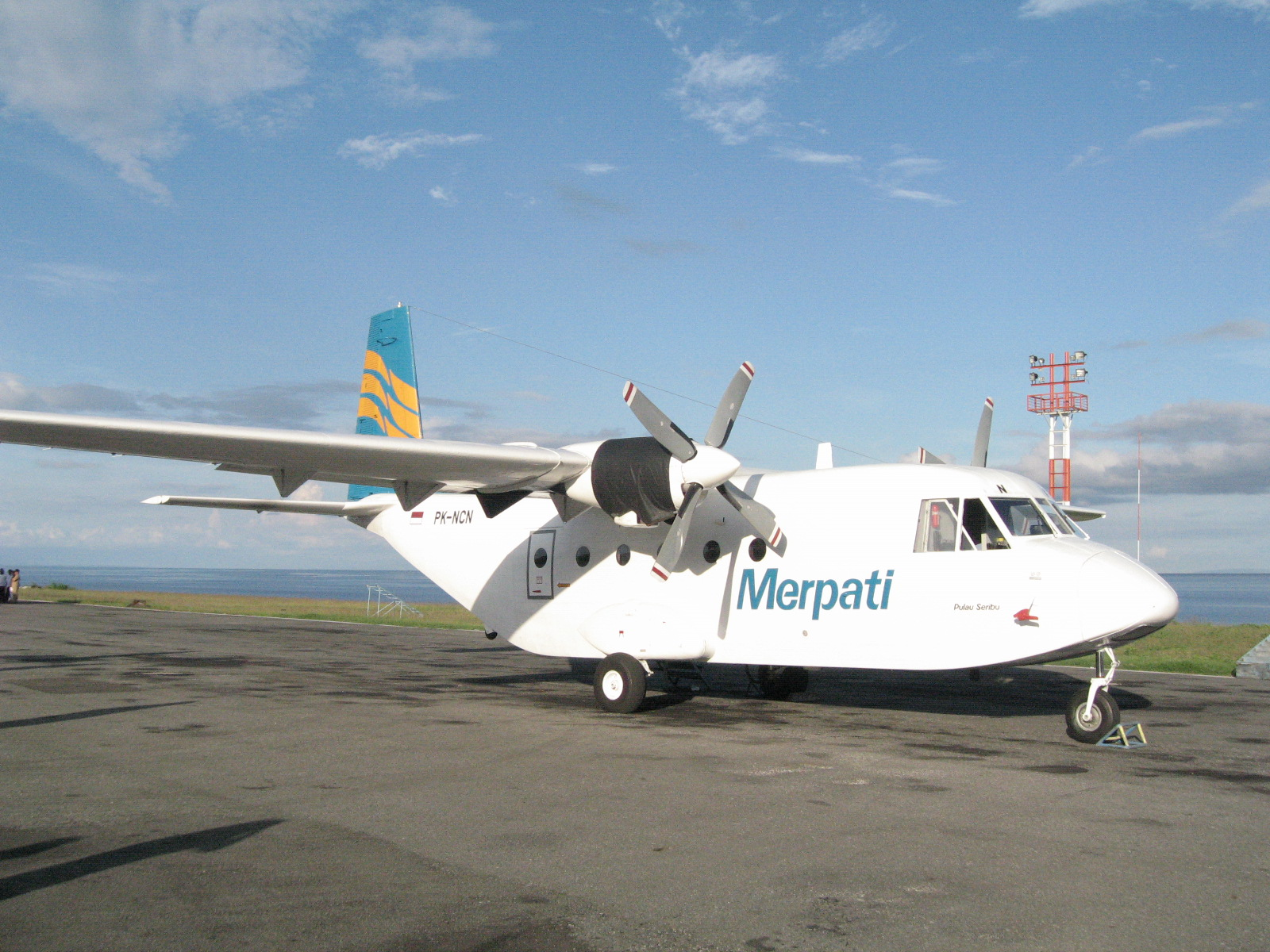
A Merpati Nusantara Airlines CASA C-212 Aviocar

In April 1983, an Indonesian State-owned airline, Merpati Nusantara Airlines, started operating a Kupang–Dili–Maliana–Covalima/Suai flight. In 1985, that service was being flown twice a week. As of the mid-1990s, Merpati was still flying into Covalima/Suai, and in mid 1999, Merpati was operating one flight a week on a Dili–Covalima/Suai–Kupang routing, using an Indonesian-built CASA turboprop aircraft.

When the Indonesian occupation of East Timor came to an end later that year, the runway at Suai was still only very short. During the ensuing INTERFET peacemaking operation, the 17th Construction Squadron of the Australian Army upgraded the airport to support all-weather operations by Lockheed C-130 Hercules aircraft. The runway was extended by 150 metres (490 ft), and a turning node added. Hard stands were provided, along with accommodation, workshops and five helipads.

At around that time, the terminal was remodelled and fitted with air conditioning.

In the lead-up to the airport's upgrading in the mid-2010s, its runway was an 'all weather' asphalt strip 1,053 m (3,455 ft) long and 19.3 m (63 ft) wide that could accommodate aircraft as large as a C-130. In general, the airport was for day time use only, but helicopter operations could be supported at night.

Timor-Leste's national Strategic Development Plan 2011-2030 identified a need to extend and refurbish the runway and build new modern facilities.

After a significant upgrading, the airport in its present form was officially inaugurated on 20 June 2017, and named in honour of East Timorese resistance leader and statesman Xanana Gusmão. The facilities added during the upgrading included a new sealed runway, a terminal building, a control tower, hangars for five large helicopters and fire fighting equipment. The Indonesian State-owned enterprise PT Waskita Karya carried out the upgrading, at a total cost of US$86.7 million.

On 28 September 2018, the airport hosted its first international arrival, a charter flight from Darwin, Australia, operated by Northern Oil & Gas Australia (NOGA).

As of 2019, the airport was barely being used, and usually had no more than one flight a day.

== Facilities ==
As upgraded, the airport has modern facilities complying with the International Civil Aviation Organization (ICAO) standards for the safe operation of airplanes, light aircraft and helicopters. The facilities include a 1,500 m (4,900 ft) runway, a terminal building, a control tower, a fire station, a meteorological station and a helipad with medevac air ambulance capability.

== See also ==
- List of airports in Timor-Leste
- Transport in Timor-Leste
