= Viqueque Airport =

Airport in East Timor

Coordinates: 8°53′2″S 126°22′23″E

Viqueque Airport (IATA: VIQ, ICAO: WPVQ) serves Viqueque, East Timor.
